= Honda Sports Award pre-2000 winners and nominees =

The main article would exceed space guidelines if all winners and nominees were listed on that page, so winners and nominees for years prior to 2000 are listed here.

== 1976–77 Winners and nominees ==
Sport	Winner	College
Basketball	Lucy Harris	Delta State
Cross country	Julie Brown	Cal State Northridge
Field hockey	Karen Shelton	West Chester
Golf	Beth Daniel	Furman
Gymnastics (tie)	Ann Carr	Penn State
Gymnastics (tie)	Connie Jo Israel	Clarion State
Softball	Audie Kujala	Delaware
Swimming & Diving	Melissa Belote	Arizona State
Tennis	Kathy Mueller	Trenton State College
Track & Field	Evelyn Ashford	UCLA
Volleyball	Flora Hyman	Houston

Award	Winner	Sport	College
Honda Cup Collegiate Woman Athlete of the Year	Lucy Harris	Basketball	Delta State

== 1977–78 Winners and nominees ==
Sport	Winner	College
Basketball	Ann Meyers	UCLA
Cross country	Kathy Mills	Penn State
Field hockey	Karen Shelton	West Chester
Golf	Debbie Petrizzi	Texas
Gymnastics	Ann Carr	Penn State
Softball	Kathy Arendsen	Texas Woman's
Swimming & Diving	Renee Laravie	Florida
Tennis	Jeanne Duvall	UCLA
Track & Field	Kathy Mills	Penn State
Volleyball	Debbie Green	USC

Award	Winner	Sport	College	Picture
Honda Cup Collegiate Woman Athlete of the Year	Ann Meyers	Basketball	UCLA	

== 1978–79 Winners and nominees ==
Sport	Winner	College
Basketball	Nancy Lieberman	Old Dominion
Cross country	Kathy Mills	Penn State
Field hockey	Karen Shelton	West Chester
Golf	Kyle O'Brien	San Jose State
Gymnastics	Kolleen Casey	SMU
Softball	Kathy Arendsen	Texas Woman's
Swimming & Diving	Joan Pennington	Texas
Tennis	Kathy Jordan	Stanford
Track & Field	Jody Anderson	Cal State Northridge
Volleyball	Annette Cottle	Utah State

Award	Winner	Sport	College	Picture
Honda Cup Collegiate Woman Athlete of the Year	Nancy Lieberman	Basketball	Old Dominion	

== 1979–80 Winners and nominees ==
Sport	Winner	College
Basketball	Nancy Lieberman	Old Dominion
Cross country	Joan Benoit	Bowdoin College
Field hockey	Brenda Becker	West Chester
Golf	Patty Sheehan	San Jose State
Gymnastics	Ann Carr	Penn State
Softball	Kathy Arendsen	Cal State Chico
Swimming & Diving	Jill Sterkel	Texas
Tennis	Wendy White	Rollins College
Track & Field	Julie Shea	North Carolina State
Volleyball	Ann Meyers	Dayton

Award	Winner	Sport	College
Honda Cup Collegiate Woman Athlete of the Year	Julie Shea	Track & Field	North Carolina State

== 1980–81 Winners and nominees ==
Sport	Winner	College
Basketball	Lynette Woodard	Kansas
Cross country	Julie Shea	North Carolina State
Field hockey	Jeannie Fissinger	Penn State
Golf	Terry Moody	Georgia
Gymnastics	Sharon Shapiro	UCLA
Softball	Kathy Riley	East Carolina
Swimming & Diving	Jill Sterkel	Texas
Tennis	Anna Fernandez	USC
Track & Field	Leann Warren	Oregon
Volleyball	Patty Berg	University of the Pacific

Award	Winner	Sport	College
Honda Cup Collegiate Woman Athlete of the Year	Jill Sterkel	Swimming & Diving	

== 1981–82 Winners and nominees ==
Sport	Winner	College
Basketball	Pam Kelly	Louisiana Tech
Cross country	Patsy Sharples	Idaho
Field hockey	Candy Fin	Penn State
Golf	Juli Inkster	San Jose State
Gymnastics	Ann Woods	Florida
Softball	Joanne English	California State University, Sacramento
Swimming & Diving	Tracy Caulkins	Florida
Tennis	Heather Crowe	Indiana
Track & Field	Karin Smith	Cal Poly San Luis Obispo
Volleyball	Sally Schlobohm	Texas

Award	Winner	Sport	College	Picture
Honda Cup Collegiate Woman Athlete of the Year	Tracy Caulkins	Swimming & Diving	Florida	

== 1982–83 Winners and nominees ==
Sport	Winner	College	Finalists
Basketball	Anne Donovan	Old Dominion	Janice Lawrence, Louisiana Tech; Paula McGee, USC; Margie O’Brien, Clark; LaTaunya Pollard, Cal State Long Beach; Valerie Still, Kentucky; Jackie White, Cal Poly Pomona
Cross country	Lesley Welch	Virginia	Amy Harper, Cal Poly San Luis Obispo; Ceci Hopp, Stanford; Regina Joyce, Washington; Tori Neubauer, Wisconsin, LaCrosse
Field hockey	Yolanda Hightower	Old Dominion	Ann Grim, Lock Haven State College; Martha Russo, Princeton; Debbie Schimpf, Trenton State College; Brenda Stauffer, Penn State
Golf	Penny Hammel	Miami	Cindy Davis, Furman; Jody Rosenthal, Tulsa; Rita More, Texas Christian
Gymnastics	Jeri Cameron	Arizona State	Karen Beer, Denver; Cindy Lazzarino, San Francisco State; Megan McCunniff, Utah; Kathy McMinn, Georgia
Softball	Lori Stoll	TAMU	Suzy Brazney, Cal Poly Pomona; Erin Capps, Oregon State; Tracy Compton, UCLA; Debbi Doom, UCLA; Dot Richardson, UCLA; Wende Ward, Fresno State
Swimming & Diving	Tracy Caulkins	Florida	Elizabeth Jex, Williams College; Megan Neyer, Florida; Jeanne O’Connor, Clarion State; Jill Sterkel, Texas; Tammy Thomas, Kansas; Sue Walsh, North Carolina
Tennis	Louise Allen	Trinity	GiGi Fernández, Clemson; Elizabeth Herr, USC; Suzanne Kuhlman, Georgetown; Laurie Laughlin, Southwestern College; Gretchen Rush, Trinity
Track & Field	Jackie Joyner	UCLA	Carol Cady, Stanford; Randy Givens, Florida State; Tori Neubauer, Wisconsin, LaCrosse; Merlene Ottey, Nebraska; Betty Springs, North Carolina State; Kim Whitehead, Morgan State
Volleyball	Deitre Collins	Hawai'i	Jeanne Beauprey, UCLA; Star Clark, California, Riverside; Tracy Clark, USC; Toni Himmer, San Diego State; Jan Saunders, University of the Pacific; Tammy Smit, UC San Diego; Dana Smith, USC

Award	Winner	Sport	College
Honda Cup Collegiate Woman Athlete of the Year			

== 1983–84 Winners and nominees ==
Sport	Winner	College	Finalists
Basketball	Cheryl Miller	USC	Carla Eades, Central Missouri State; Janet Harris, Georgia; Janice Lawrence, Louisiana Tech; Page Lutz, Elizabethtown College; Joyce Walker, Louisiana State
Cross country	Betty Springs	North Carolina State	Nan Doak, Iowa; Amy Harper, Cal Poly San Luis Obispo; Kathy Hayes, Oregon; Tori Neubauer, Wisconsin, LaCrosse
Field hockey	Laurie Decker	Connecticut	Ellen Egan, Iowa; Ann Grim, Lock Haven State; Terry Kix, Connecticut; Luci Lagrimas, University of the Pacific; Missy Meharg, Delaware; Christy Morgan, Old Dominion
Golf	Cindy Schreyer	Georgia	Penny Hammel, Miami; Tina Tombs, Arizona State; Mary Anne Widman, Duke
Gymnastics	Megan Marsden	Utah	Tami Elliott, Cal State Fullerton; Debbie Lindemer, Wisconsin, Oshkosh; Jennifer McFarland, Jacksonville State; Lisa Zeis, Arizona State
Softball	Debbie Doom	UCLA	Josie Carter, TAMU; Sheila Cornell, UCLA; Lisa Ishikawa, Northwestern; Lea Ann Jarvis, Louisiana Tech; Sue Lewis, Cal State Fullerton; Kathy Slaten, California State Northridge; Karen Youngman, Trenton State College
Swimming & Diving	Tracy Caulkins	Florida	Patty Abt, Kenyon College; Marybeth Linzemeier, Stanford; Megan Neyer, Florida; Joan Pennington, Texas; Sarah Rudolph, Puget Sound; Sue Walsh, North Carolina
Tennis	Lisa Spain	Georgia	Courtney Allen, Principia College; Elise Burgin, Stanford; Elizabeth Calander, Southern Illinois; Linda Gates, Stanford
Track & Field	Randy Givens	Florida State	Carol Cady, Stanford; Claudette Groendaal, Oregon; Nawal El Moutawakel, Iowa State; Tori Neubauer, Wisconsin, LaCrosse; Marita Payne, Florida State; Dannette Young, Alabama A&M
Volleyball	Deitre Collins	Hawai'i	Eileen Dempster, University of the Pacific; Kim Holder, California, Riverside; Karolyn Kirby, Kentucky; Kim Oden, Stanford; Patty Orozco, UCLA; Jan Saunders, University of the Pacific; Molley Wheatley, UC San Diego

Award	Winner	Sport	College	Picture
Honda Cup Collegiate Woman Athlete of the Year (tie)	Cheryl Miller	Basketball	USC	
Honda Cup Collegiate Woman Athlete of the Year (tie)	Tracy Caulkins	Swimming & Diving	Florida	

== 1984–85 Winners and nominees ==
Sport	Winner	College	Finalists
Basketball	Cheryl Miller	USC	Medina Dixon, Old Dominion; Teresa Edwards, Georgia; Janet Harris, Georgia; Rosie Jones, Central Missouri State; Deanna Kyle, Scranton; Eun Jung Lee, Northeast Louisiana
Cross country	Cathy Branta	Wisconsin	Julia Kirtland, Macalester College; Christine McMiken, Oklahoma State; Christine Ridenour, Southeast Missouri State; Shelly Steely, Florida
Field hockey	Christy Morgan	Old Dominion	Terry Kix, Connecticut; Mary Koboldt, Iowa; Barbara Marois, New Hampshire; Diane Smith, Trenton State College; Jennifer Terranova, Messiah College; Eveline Veraart, Old Dominion
Golf	Deb Richard	Florida	Danielle Ammaccapane, Arizona State; Karen Davies, Florida; Dottie Pepper, Furman; Jody Rosenthal, Tulsa
Gymnastics	Penney Hauschild	Alabama	Tami Elliott, Cal State Fullerton; Kimberly Neal, Arizona State; Jennifer McFarland, Jacksonville State; Elfi Schlegel, Florida
Softball	Denise Day Eckert	Nebraska	Karen Allen, Nicholls State; Joann Ferrieri, Cal State Fullerton; Lee Ann Jarvis, Louisiana Tech; Carol Maioran, Trenton State College; Deborah Mygind, Cal State Fullerton; Kathy Slaten, Cal State Northridge
Swimming & Diving	Mary T. Meagher	California	Patty Abt, Kenyon College; Tiffany Cohen, Texas; Dawn Hewitt, South Florida; Kim Rhodenbaugh, Texas; Conny Van Bentum, California; Mary Wayte, Florida
Tennis	Linda Gates	Stanford	Courtney Allen, Principia College; Elizabeth Calander, Southern Illinois; Leigh Anne Eldredge, Stanford; Gretchen Rush, Trinity
Track & Field	Jackie Joyner	UCLA	Zina Age, Southern; Julie Bowers, West Chester; Cathy Branta, Wisconsin, Madison; Wendy Brown, USC; Laura De Snoo, San Diego State; Latanya Mechun Sheffield, San Diego State
Volleyball	Liz Masakayan	UCLA	Lori Barberich, Penn State; Sue Harbour, Oregon; Lynda Johnson, Portland State; Kristin Kilbourn, UC San Diego; Kim Oden, Stanford; Angela Rock, San Diego State; Jan Saunders, University of the Pacific

Award	Winner	Sport	College	Picture
Honda Cup Collegiate Woman Athlete of the Year	Jackie Joyner	Track & Field	UCLA	

== 1985–86 Winners and nominees ==
Sport	Winner	College	Finalists
Basketball	Kamie Ethridge	Texas	Teresa Edwards, Georgia; Jennifer Gillom, Mississippi; Eun Jung Lee, Northeast Louisiana; Jane Meyer, Elizabethtown College; Cheryl Miller, USC; Vickie Mitchell, Cal Poly Pomona
Cross country	Suzie Tuffey	North Carolina State	Dorcas Denhartog, Middlebury College; Regina Jacobs, Stanford; Christine McMiken, Oklahoma State; Bente Moe, Seattle Pacific
Field hockey	Megan Donnelly	UMass Amherst	Bonnie Bair, Elizabethtown College; Karen Hertzler, Bloomsburg; Amy Kekeisen, Northwestern; Marcia Pankratz, Iowa; Janet Ryan, Connecticut; Sandy Vander-Heyden, New Hampshire; Cheryl Van Kuren, Old Dominion
Golf	Page Dunlap	Florida	Holly Anderson, Methodist College; Tina Barrett, Longwood College; Kay Cockerill UCLA; Karen Davies, Florida; Robin Hood, Oklahoma State; Jenny Lidback, Louisiana State
Gymnastics	Penney Hauschild	Alabama	Jackie Brummer, Arizona State; Tami Elliott, Cal State Fullerton; Jeanne Foster, College of William and Mary; Mary Leivian, Wisconsin Oshkosh
Softball	Sue Lefebvre	Cal State Fullerton	Pam Clay, Stephen F. Austin; Cynthia Cooper, TAMU; Stacey Johnson, Louisiana Tech; Chenita Rogers, Cal State Fullerton; Alicia Seegert, Michigan; Amy Unterbrink, Indiana; Patricia Wodatch, Eastern Connecticut State
Swimming & Diving	Jenna Johnson	Stanford	Tami Bruce, Florida; Erin Finneran, Kenyon College; Coria Mamalo, Clarion State; Angel Myers, Furman; Megan Neyer, Florida; Beth Olsen, Colorado College; Patty Sabo, Texas; Conny Van Bentum, California
Tennis	Gretchen Rush	Trinity	Debbie Daniel, Trenton State College; Patty Fendick, Stanford; Lise Gregory, Miami; Nancy Roe, Northern Colorado
Track & Field	Juliet Cuthbert	Texas	Regina Cavanaugh, Rice; Yolanda Henry, Abilene Christian; Stephanie Herbst, Wisconsin; Julia Kirtland, Macalester College; Terri Turner, Texas; Maria Usifo, Texas Southern
Volleyball	Kim Oden	Stanford	Tracy Clark, USC; Kim Ruddins, USC; Lynda Johnson, Portland State; Liz Masakayan, UCLA; Elaina Olden, University of the Pacific; Wendi Rush, Stanford; Sherri Petrick, Illinois Benedictine College

Award	Winner	Sport	College
Honda Cup Collegiate Woman Athlete of the Year	Kamie Ethridge	Basketball	Texas

== 1986–87 Winners and nominees ==
Sport	Winner	College	Finalists
Basketball	Katrina McClain	Georgia	Cindy Brown, Cal Long Beach; Clarissa Davis, Texas; Candace Fincher, Valdosta State; Suzie McConnell, Penn State; Shelley Parks, Scranton; Sue Wicks, Rutgers
Cross country	Angela Chalmers	Northern Arizona	Stephanie Herbst, Wisconsin; Lisa Koelfgen, College of St. Thomas; Christine McMiken, Oklahoma State; Gladees Prieur, California State, SLO; Annie Schweitzer, Texas, Austin
Field hockey	Jennifer Averill	Northwestern	Bonnie Bair, Elizabethtown College; Lori Bruney, North Carolina; Sandi Costigan, New Hampshire; Tracey Fuchs, Connecticut; Lisa Griswold, Massachusetts; Mary Alice McCarthy, Penn State
Golf	Caroline Keggi	New Mexico	Karen Davies, Florida; Robin Hood, Oklahoma State; Laurette Maritz, U.S. International
Gymnastics	Kelly Garrison-Steves	Oklahoma	Julie Estin, Alabama; Kim Hamilton, UCLA; Lynne Lederer, Utah; Yumi Mordre, Washington; Lucy Wener, Georgia; Corrinne Wright, Georgia
Softball	Connie Clark	Cal Fullerton	Kathy Gass, Nebraska; Liz Mizera, TAMU; Chenita Rogers, Cal Fullerton; Lori Sippel, Nebraska; Anne Westerkamp, Illinois Benedictine; Rhonda Wheatley, Cal Poly Pomona
Swimming & Diving	Mary T. Meagher	California	Patty Abt, Kenyon College; Jenna Johnson, Stanford; Betsy Mitchell, Texas; Tina Schnare, Cal State Northridge; Dara Torres, Florida; Mary Wayte, Florida
Tennis	Patty Fendick	Stanford	Katrina Adams, Northwestern; Courtney Allen, Principia; Xenia Anastasiadou, Cal Poly Pomona; Diane Donnelly, Northwestern; Stephanie Savides, Stanford; Shaun Stafford, Florida
Track & Field	Regina Cavanaugh	Rice	Alisa Harvey, Tennessee; Vicki Huber, Villanova; Lillie Leatherwood King, Alabama; Gwen Torrence, Georgia
Volleyball	Karen Dahlgren	Nebraska	Lisa Ice, San Jose State; Elaina Oden, University of the Pacific; Annie Kniss, Cal Riverside; Mariliisa Salmi, BYU; Liane Sato, San Diego State; Tammy Webb, Arizona State; Anne Westerkamp, Illinois Benedictine College

Award	Winner	Sport	College
Honda Cup Collegiate Woman Athlete of the Year	Mary T. Meagher	Swimming & Diving	California

== 1987–88 Winners and nominees ==
Sport	Winner	College	Finalists
Basketball	Teresa Weatherspoon	Louisiana Tech	Jessica Beachy, Concordia; Michelle Edwards, Iowa; Bridgette Gordon, Tennessee; Vickie Orr, Auburn; Vanessa Wells, West Texas State; Sue Wicks, Rutgers
Cross country	Kim Betz	Indiana	Jackie Goodman, Oklahoma State; Annette Hand, Oregon; Kristina Ljungberg, UTEP; Sylvia Mosqueda, California State, Louisiana; Suzie Tuffey, North Carolina State
Field hockey	Tracey Fuchs	Connecticut	Lori Bruney, North Carolina; Mary Ellen Falcone, North Carolina; Tracey Griesbaum, West Chester; Elizabeth Tchou, Iowa; Christine Telfer, Millersville; Kim Turner, Maryland; Sarah Warriner, William Smith
Golf	Tina Barrett	Longwood College	Nicole Danforth, Amherst College; Michiko Hattori, Texas; Tracy Kerdyk, Miami; Melissa McNamara, Tulsa; Pamela Wright, Arizona State
Gymnastics	Kelly Garrison-Steves	Oklahoma	Jill Andrews, UCLA; Kim Hamilton, UCLA; Patti Massoels, Utah; Michelle Reyes, Navy; Jessica Smith, Utah
Softball	Lisa Longaker	UCLA	Debbie Dickmann, Cal Northridge; Jill Justin, Northern Illinois University; Pam McCreesh, Trenton State; Liz Mizera, Texas A&M; Karen Sanchelli, South Carolina; Michele Smith, Oklahoma State
Swimming & Diving	Betsy Mitchell	Texas	Mary Fishbach, Michigan; Julie Gorman, Florida; Tami Bruce, Florida; Shelly Russell, Hope College; Dara Torres, Florida; Ann Wycoff, USMA, West Point
Tennis	Shaun Stafford	Florida	Xenia Anastasiadou, Cal Pomona; Caroline Bodart, Menlo College; Halle Cioffi, Florida; Allison Cooper, UCLA; Lisa Green, Stanford; Ronni Reis, Miami; Stella Sampras, UCLA
Track & Field	Vicki Huber	Villanova	Wendy Brown, USC; Gail Devers, UCLA; Carlette Guidry, Texas; Jearl Miles, Alabama A&M; Meg White, Smith College
Volleyball	Suzanne Eagye	Hawai'i	Judy Bellomo, UCSB; Angela Brinton, Cal Northridge; Janet Hughes, UCSD; Teri McGrath, University of the Pacific; Wendi Rush, Stanford; Mariliisa Salmi, Brigham Young; Teee Williams, Hawai'i

Award	Winner	Sport	College	Picture
Honda Cup Collegiate Woman Athlete of the Year	Teresa Weatherspoon	Basketball	Louisiana Tech	
Honda Inspiration Award winner	Marie Roethlisberger	Gymnastics	Minnesota	
DII Honda Athlete of the Year	Angela Brinton	Volleyball	Cal Northridge	
DIII Honda Athlete of the Year	Jessica Beachy	Basketball	Concordia	

== 1988–89 Winners and nominees ==
Sport	Winner	College	Finalists
Basketball	Bridgette Gordon	Tennessee	Vicky Bullett, Maryland; Clarissa Davis, Texas; Kirsten Dumford, Cal Stanislaus; Cathy Gooden, California State Poly, Pomona; Vickie Orr, Auburn; Deanna Tate, Maryland
Cross country	Michelle Dekkers	Indiana	Sonia Barry, Oklahoma State; Laura Byrne, Southeast Missouri State; Jackie Goodman, Oklahoma State; Tina Ljungberg, UTEP; Anna Prineas, Carleton College; Carole Trepanier, Alabama
Field hockey	Diane Madl	Connecticut	Pam Bustin, Massachusetts; Daneen Ferro, Bloomsburg; Jill Fisher, Old Dominion; Karen Jones, Stanford; Erica Richards, Iowa
Golf	Pat Hurst	San Jose State	Joy Bonhurst, Methodist College; Michiko Hattori, Texas; Katie Peterson, North Carolina; Pearl Sinn, Arizona State; Bettina Walker, Rollins College; Jean Zedlitz, UCLA
Gymnastics	Lucy Wener	Georgia	Jill Andrews, UCLA; Rose Johnson, Indiana Pennsylvania; Mary Leivian, Wisconsin, Oshkosh; Melissa Miller, Florida; Tanya Service, UCLA; Corrinne Wright, Georgia
Soccer	Shannon Higgins	North Carolina	Joy Biefeld, California; Tracy Deyle, Ithaca College; Katree Hodgdon, Vermont; April Kater, UMass; Kim Prutting, Connecticut; Kerri Tashiro, Colorado College; Dawn Wagner, Barry
Softball	Janice Parks	UCLA	Jenny Allard, Michigan; Missy Coombes, Cal Fullerton; Michelle Delloso, South Carolina; Debbie Dickmann, Cal Northridge; Diana Klueg, Trenton State College; Jill Justin, Northern Illinois; Michelle Smith, Oklahoma State
Swimming & Diving	Jenna Johnson	Stanford	Leigh Ann Fetter, Texas; Michelle Griglione, Stanford; Mitzi Kremer, Clemson; Kristen Linehan, Florida; Shelly Russell, Hope College; Ann Wycoff, USMA, West Point
Tennis	Sandra Birch	Stanford	Caroline Bodart, Menlo College; Christina Bokelund, Southern Illinois; Lisa Green, Stanford; Jackie Holden, Mississippi State; Claire Pollard, Mississippi State; Noelle Porter, Pepperdine; Jennifer Santrock, SMU
Track & Field	Vicki Huber	Villanova	Pauline Davis, Alabama; Suzy Favor, Wisconsin; Carla Garrett, Arizona; Anna Prineas, Carleton College; Dawn Sowell, LSU; Mazel Thomas, Abilene Christian College
Volleyball	Mary Eggers	Illinois	Ann Boyer, UCLA; Janet Cobbs, North Dakota State;Tara Cross, Cal Long Beach; Dylann Duncan, Brigham Young; Lori Nishikawa, Washington; Daiva Tomkus, UCLA; Teee Williams, Hawai'i

Award	Winner	Sport	College
Honda Cup Collegiate Woman Athlete of the Year	Vicki Huber	Track & Field	Villanova
Honda Inspiration Award winner	Angie Jacobs	Softball	California
DII Honda Athlete of the Year	Janet Cobbs	Volleyball	North Dakota State
DIII Honda Athlete of the Year	Anna Prineas	Basketball	Concordia

== 1989–90 Winners and nominees ==
Sport	Winner	College	Finalists
Basketball	Jennifer Azzi	Stanford	Crystal Hardy, Delta State; Susan Heidt St. John, Fisher College; Portia Hill, Stephen F. Austin; Venus Lacey, Louisiana Tech; Wendy Scholtens, Vanderbilt; Andrea Stinson, North Carolina State
Cross country	Vicki Huber	Villanova	Darcy Arreola, Cal Northridge; Susan Blis, Missouri; Marybeth Crawley, SUNY Cortland; Michelle Dekkers, Indiana; Valerie McGovern, Kentucky; Patty Wiegand, Tennessee
Field hockey	Leslie Lyness	North Carolina	Melissa Carman, Lock Haven; Jane Catanzara, Temple; Kathy DeAngelis, UMass Amherst; Kristin Eide, Millersville; Cherie Freddie, Iowa; Kim Metcalf, Northwestern
Golf	Michiko Hattori	Texas	Dina Ammaccapane, San Jose State; Dana Arnold, USC; Amy Hooks, Amherst College; Susan Slaughter, Arizona; Amy Schonauer, Longwood College
Gymnastics	Jill Andrews	UCLA	Dee Dee Foster, Alabama; Rachelle Frug, LSU; Kristen Kenoyer, Utah; Maureen Lagrua, Bridgeport; Shelly Scharer, Utah; Carol Ulrich, UCLA
Soccer	Shannon Higgins	North Carolina	Joy Biefeld, California; Tracy Deyle, Ithaca College; Katree Hodgdon, Vermont; April Kater, UMass; Kim Prutting, Connecticut; Kerri Tashiro, Colorado College; Dawn Wagner, Barry
Softball	Lisa Longaker	UCLA	Debbie Dickmann, Cal Northridge; Michele Granger, California; Yvonne Gutierrex, UCLA; Christia Mohan, Eastern Connecticut State; Martha Noffsinger, Fresno State; Jule Smith, Fresno State; Stefni Whitton, Southwestern Louisiana
Swimming & Diving	Janet Evans	Stanford	Leigh Ann Fetter, Texas; Yvonne Grierson, MIT; Whitney Hedgepeth, Florida; Kristen Linehan, Florida; Janel Jorgensen, Stanford; Lyn Schermer, Oakland
Tennis	Debbie Graham	Stanford	Nicole Arendt, Florida; Christine Behrens, UC San Diego; Sandra Birch, Stanford; Eveline Hamers, Kansas; Meredith McGrath, Stanford; Edna Olivarez, California State, Los Angeles; Teri Whitlinger, Stanford
Track & Field	Suzy Favor	Wisconsin	Gretchen Farkas, College of St. Thomas; Shelia Hudson, California; Gea Johnson, Arizona State; Esther Jones, LSU; Tracie Millett, UCLA; Diana Wills, Army
Volleyball	Tara Cross	Long Beach State	Melinda Beckenhauer, Washington; Sheri Benson, Cal Riverside; Lori Nishikawa, Washington; Sheri Sanders, Long Beach State; Shawn Sweeten, Texas, Arlington; Daiva Tomkus, UCLA; Teee Williams-Sanders, Hawai'i

Award	Winner	Sport	College
Honda Cup Collegiate Woman Athlete of the Year	Suzy Favor	Track & Field	Wisconsin
Honda Inspiration Award winner	Jill Robertson	Track & Field	Montclair State
DII Honda Athlete of the Year	Chrystal Hardy	Basketball	Delta State
DIII Honda Athlete of the Year	Yvonne Grierson	Swimming & Diving	MIT

== 1990–91 Winners and nominees ==
Sport	Winner	College	Finalists
Basketball	Dawn Staley	Virginia	Daedra Charles, Tennessee; Ann Gilbert, Oberlin College; Sonja Henning, Stanford; Tracy Saunders, Norfolk State; Andrea Stinson, North Carolina State
Cross country	Suzy Favor	Wisconsin	Susan Bliss, Missouri; Callie Calhoun, Air Force; Vicki Mitchell, SUNY Cortland; Sonia O’Sullivan, Villanova; Buffy Rabbitt, California, Irvine
Field hockey	Jane Catanzaro	Temple	Melissa Carman, Lock Haven; Jane Catanzara, Temple; Kathy DeAngelis, UMass Amherst; Kristin Eide, Millersville; Cherie Freddie, Iowa; Kim Metcalf, Northwestern
Golf	Amy Hooks	Amherst College	Kristi Coats, Louisiana State; Christy Erb, UCLA; Renee Heiken, Illinois; Kelly Robbins, Tulsa; Amy Schonauer, Longwood College; Annika Sörenstam, Arizona
Gymnastics	Hope Spivey	Georgia	Dee Dee Foster, Alabama; Kristen Kenoyer, Utah; Melissa Marlowe, Utah; Amanda Murdock, Gustavus Adolphus; Cherie Peterson, Southeast Missouri State
Soccer	Brandi Chastain	Santa Clara	Kyllene Carter, Barry; April Kater, Massachusetts; Janine Englehard, SUNY Cortland; Robin Lotze, College of William & Mary; Karen Richter, Central Florida
Softball	Lisa Fernandez	UCLA	Michele Granger, California; Yvonne Gutierrex, UCLA; Jeanne Hengemuhle, Trenton State College; Julie Krauth, Augustana College; Julie Smith, Fresno State
Swimming & Diving	Leigh Ann Fetter	Texas	Crissy Ahmann-Leighton, Arizona; Catherine Capriles, UC San Diego; Janet Evans, Stanford; Kateri Mathews, Kenyon College; Summer Sanders, Stanford; Kirsten Silvester, Northern Michigan
Tennis	Sandra Birch	Stanford	Lisa Albano, California; Jillian Alexander, Florida; Nicole Arendt, Florida; Karyn Cooper, Wellesley College; Laura Simmons, Air Force
Track & Field	Carlette Guidry	Texas	Esther Jones, LSU; Jasmin Jones, Tennessee; Maicel Malone, Arizona State; Lucie Mays, Southeast Missouri State; Vera Stenhouse, Tufts
Volleyball	Beverly Oden	Stanford	Becky Belland, Central Missouri State; Kathy Bersett, Washington; Val Novak, Nebraska; Cathy Scotlan, University of the Pacific; Karrie Trieschman, Hawai'i

Award	Winner	Sport	College
Honda Cup Collegiate Woman Athlete of the Year	Dawn Staley	Basketball	Virginia
Honda Inspiration Award winner	Tracy Nichols	Cross country	Vassar
DII Honda Athlete of the Year	Tracy Saunders	Basketball	Norfolk State
DIII Honda Athlete of the Year	Ann Gilbert	Basketball	Oberlin

== 1991–92 Winners and nominees ==
Sport	Winner	College	Finalists
Basketball	Dawn Staley	Virginia	Kathy Beck, Moravian College; Dena Head, Tennessee; Frances Savage, Miami; Val Whiting, Stanford; Mindy Young, Pittsburg
Cross country	Sonia O’Sullivan	Villanova	Christie Allen, Pittsburg State; Laurie Gomez-Henes, North Carolina State; Laura Horejs, Wisconsin, Oshkosh; Lisa Karnopp, Oregon; Carole Zajac, Villanova
Field hockey	Gina Carey	Trenton State	Melissa Carman, Lock Haven; Jane Catanzara, Temple; Kathy DeAngelis, UMass Amherst; Kristin Eide, Millersville; Cherie Freddie, Iowa; Kim Metcalf, Northwestern
Golf	Vicki Goetze	Georgia	Tracy Hanson, San Jose State; Leta Lindley, Arizona; Debbie Pappas, Rollins College; Annika Sörenstam, Arizona
Gymnastics	Missy Marlowe	Utah	Kathie Cradduck, Seattle Pacific; Dee Dee Foster, Alabama; Kim Holmes, SUNY Cortland; Kristen Kenoyer, Utah; Heather Stepp, Georgia
Soccer	Kristine Lilly	North Carolina	Tami Bradley, Sonoma State; Amanda Cromwell, Virginia; Julie Foudy, Stanford; Ann Haggerty, William Smith College; Tiffeny Milbrett, Portland
Softball	Lisa Fernandez	UCLA	Lois Fyfe, Montclair State College; Michele Granger, California; Yvonne Gutierrex, UCLA; Marty Laudato, Bloomsburg; Tiff Tootle, South Carolina
Swimming & Diving	Summer Sanders	Stanford	Crissy Ahmann-Leighton, Arizona; Carla Ainsworth, Kenyon College; Nicole Haislett, Florida; Whitney Hedgepeth, Texas; Noemi Lung, Florida Atlantic; Jenny Thompson, Stanford
Tennis	Lisa Raymond	Florida	Mamie Ceniza, UCLA; Shelley Keeler, Pomona-Pitzer College; Michelle King, Abilene Christian; Iwalani McCalla, UCLA; Shannon McCarthy, Georgia
Track & Field	Kim Oden	Nebraska Wesleyan	Dawn Bowles, Louisiana State; Chryste Gaines, Stanford; Kristina Hand, Cal Poly State; Anita Howard, Florida; Carol Zajac, Villanova
Volleyball	Natalie Williams	UCLA	Monique Adams, LSU; Melinda Beckenhauer-Heller, University of the Pacific; Kristin Klein, Stanford; Ana Cristina Pereira, West Texas State; Elizabeth Tan, UC San Diego; Antoinnette White, Cal State, Long Beach

Award	Winner	Sport	College
Honda Cup Collegiate Woman Athlete of the Year	Missy Marlowe	Gymnastics	Utah
Honda Inspiration Award winner	Heather Stepp	Gymnastics	Georgia
DII Honda Athlete of the Year	Kristina Hand	Basketball	Cal Poly State
DIII Honda Athlete of the Year	Kim Oden	Track & Field	Nebraska Wesleyan

== 1992–93 Winners and nominees ==
Sport	Winner	College	Finalists
Basketball	Sheryl Swoopes	Texas Tech	Toni Foster, Iowa; Lauretta Freeman, Auburn; Yolanda Griffith, Florida Atlantic; Laurie Trow, St. Thomas; Val Whiting, Stanford
Cross country	Carole Zajac	Villanova	Christie Allen, Pittsburg State; Janice Brown, William & Mary; Deena Drossin, Arkansas; Sarah Edmonds, Gustavus Adolphus College; Nnenna Lynch, Villanova
Field hockey	Kelli James	Old Dominion	Toni Byard, Temple; Kristy Gleason, Iowa; Ann Lynch, William Smith College; Chris McGinley, Penn State; Denise Miller, Bloomsburg
Golf	Charlotta Sorenstam	Texas	Angela Buzminski, Indiana; Charlaine Coetzee, Longwood College; Amy Hoke, Methodist College; Leta Lindley, Arizona; Wendy Ward, Arizona State
Gymnastics	Dee Dee Foster	Alabama	Kathie Cradduck, Seattle Pacific; Amy Durham, Oregon State; Jenny Hansen, Kentucky; Jill Henrie, Cal-Davis; Julie Lyren, MIT; Agina Simpkims, Georgia
Soccer	Mia Hamm	North Carolina	Melissa Galletta, Adelphi; Ann Haggerty, William Smith College; Kristine Lilly, North Carolina; Tiffeny Milbrett, Portland; Rebecca Wakefield, College of William & Mary; Saskia Webber, Rutgers
Softball	Lisa Fernandez	UCLA	Michele Granger, California; Kyla Hall, Southwestern Louisiana; Sherry Howell, Eckerd College; Stacey Mays, La Verne; Susie Parra, Arizona; Melanie Roche, Oklahoma State
Swimming & Diving	Janel Jorgensen	Stanford	Jennifer Carter, Kenyon College; Nicole Haislett, Florida; Lara Hooiveld, Michigan; Noemi Lung, Florida Atlantic; Jenny Thompson, Stanford
Tennis	Lisa Raymond	Florida	Alix Creek, Arizona; Lucie Ludvigova, Grand Canyon; Helen Motter, Middlebury College; Michelle Oldham, Arizona
Track & Field	Holli Hyche	Indiana State	Christie Allen, Pittsburg State College; Tonja Buford, Illinois; Clare Eichner, Wisconsin; Jennifer Green, Baldwin–Wallace College; Janet Hill, UCLA
Volleyball	Natalie Williams	UCLA	Lisa Becker, Washington; Stacy Metro, Northern Michigan; Stasia Nikas, Stony Brook; Beverly Oden, Stanford; Danielle Scott, Cal Long Beach; Gudula Staub, Florida; Stephanie Thater, Nebraska

Award	Winner	Sport	College	Picture
Honda Cup Collegiate Woman Athlete of the Year	Lisa Fernandez	Softball	UCLA	
Honda Inspiration Award winner	Jennifer Mead	Basketball	Providence	
DII Honda Athlete of the Year	Christie Allen	Cross country	Pittsburg State	
DIII Honda Athlete of the Year	Jennifer Carter	Swimming & Diving	Kenyon	

== 1993–94 Winners and nominees ==
Sport	Winner	College	Finalists
Basketball	Lisa Leslie	USC	Rebecca Lobo, Connecticut; Niesa Johnson, Alabama; Nikki McCray, Tennessee; Natalie Williams, UCLA
Cross country	Carole Zajac	Villanova	Kay Gooch, Oklahoma; Molly McClimon, Michigan; Jennifer Rhines, Villanova; Kim Turner, Maryland
Field hockey	Kristy Gleason	Iowa	Chris McGinley, Penn State; Amy Schubert, Maryland; Peggy Storrar, North Carolina
Golf	Wendy Ward	Arizona State	Emilee Klein, Arizona State; Jill McGill, USC; Caroline Peek, Furman
Gymnastics	Jenny Hansen	Kentucky	Kareema Marrow, UCLA; Agina Simpkims, Georgia; Aimee Trepanier, Utah; Meredith Willard, Alabama
Soccer	Mia Hamm	North Carolina	Cindy Daws, Notre Dame; Karen Ferguson, Connecticut; Jennifer Lalor, Santa Clara
Softball	Susie Parra	Arizona	Kyla Hall, Southwestern Louisiana; Kim Ward, Oklahoma State; DeeDee Weiman, UCLA
Swimming & Diving	Nicole Haislett	Florida	Kristine Quance, USC; Jenny Thompson, Stanford; Amy Van Dyken, Colorado State
Tennis	Angela Lettiere	Georgia	Rebecca Jensen, Kansas; Nóra Köves, Kansas; Keri Phebus, UCLA
Track & Field	Holli Hyche	Indiana State	Diane Guthrie, George Mason; Eileen Vanisi, Texas; Amy Wickus, Wisconsin
Volleyball	Danielle Scott	Long Beach State	Julie Bremner, UCLA; Aycan Gokberk, Florida; Katie Haller, USC; Katy Jameyson, Texas

Award	Winner	Sport	College	Picture
Honda Cup Collegiate Woman Athlete of the Year	Mia Hamm	Soccer	North Carolina	
Honda Inspiration Award winner	Haley Scott	Swimming & Diving	Notre Dame	
DII Honda Athlete of the Year	Stacy Metro	Volleyball	Northern Michigan	
DIII Honda Athlete of the Year	Carla Ainsworth	Swimming & Diving	Kenyon	

== 1994–95 Winners and nominees ==
Sport	Winner	College	Finalists
Basketball	Rebecca Lobo	Connecticut	Nikki McCray, Tennessee; Wendy Palmer, Virginia; Jennifer Rizzotti, Connecticut
Cross country	Jennifer Rhines	Villanova	Megan Flowers, Arkansas; Amy Rudolph, Providence College; Rebecca Spies, Villanova
Field hockey	Gretchen Scheuermann	Northwestern	Liz Fagan, Princeton; Kristen Kelly, Connecticut; Julie Williamson, Syracuse
Golf	Wendy Ward	Arizona State	Kristel Mourgue D’Algue, Arizona State; Vibeke Stensrud, San Jose State; Erika Wicoff, Indiana
Gymnastics	Jenny Hansen	Kentucky	Suzanne Metz, Utah; Amy Myerson, Florida; Agina Simpkins, Georgia; Stella Umeh, UCLA
Soccer	Tisha Venturini	North Carolina	Cindy Daws, Notre Dame; Tiffeny Milbrett, Portland; Jessica Reifer, Hartford
Softball	Jennifer Brundage	UCLA	Gillian Boxx, California; Amy Chellevold, Arizona; Laura Espinoza, Arizona; Kelly Rafter, Kennesaw State College
Swimming & Diving	Jenny Thompson	Stanford	Alecia Humphrey, Michigan; Beata Kaszuba, Arizona State; Cheril Santini, SMU; Ashley Tappin, Arizona; Beth Zeman, United States Air Force Academy
Tennis	Keri Phebus	UCLA	Kelly Pace, Texas; Susie Starrett, UCLA
Track & Field	Diane Guthrie-Gresham	George Mason	Amy Acuff, UCLA; Dawn Dumble, UCLA; Amy Wickus, Wisconsin
Volleyball	Laura Davis	Ohio State	Annette Buckner, UCLA; Nichelle Burton, Long Beach State; Allison Weston, Nebraska

Award	Winner	Sport	College	Picture
Honda Cup Collegiate Woman Athlete of the Year	Rebecca Lobo	Basketball	Connecticut	
Honda Inspiration Award winner	Allyssa Johnson	Softball	Arizona State	
DII Honda Athlete of the Year	Charlaine Coetzee	Golf	Longwood	
DIII Honda Athlete of the Year	Amy Albers	Volleyball	Washington University in St. Louis	

== 1995–96 Winners and nominees ==
Sport	Winner	College	Finalists
Basketball	Jennifer Rizzotti	Connecticut	Wendy Palmer, Virginia; Saudia Roundtree, Georgia; Kate Starbird, Stanford
Cross country	Kathy Butler	Wisconsin	Marie McMahon, Providence College; Jennifer Rhines, Villanova; Amy Skieresz, Arizona
Field hockey	Carole Thate	James Madison	Kate Barber, North Carolina; Diane DeMiro, Iowa; Jen Ruggiero, Northwestern
Golf	Marisa Baena	Arizona	Kellee Booth, Arizona State; Kathy Choi, California Los Angeles; Janice Moodie, San Jose State
Gymnastics	Jenny Hansen	Kentucky	Kristen Guise, Florida; Lori Strong, Georgia
Soccer	Shannon MacMillan	Portland	Cindy Daws, Notre Dame; Diana Muchowski, UC San Diego; Thori Staples, North Carolina State
Softball	Jenny Dalton	Arizona	Cheryl Longeway, Southwestern Louisiana; Heather Meyer, Washington; Gena Weber, California, Davis; Shamalene Wilson, Florida State
Swimming & Diving	Kristine Quance	USC	Lindsay Benko, USC; Penny Heyns, Nebraska; Annette Salmeen, UCLA; Jessica Tong, Stanford
Tennis	Jill Craybas	Florida	Dawn Buth, Florida; Stephanie Nickitas, Florida; M.C. White, Florida
Track & Field	D’Andre Hill	LSU	Kathy Butler, Wisconsin; Zundra Feagin, LSU; Monique Hennagan, North Carolina
Volleyball	Allison Weston	Nebraska	Aycan Gokberk, Florida; Cary Wendell, Stanford

Award	Winner	Sport	College	Picture
Honda Cup Collegiate Woman Athlete of the Year	Jennifer Rizzotti	Basketball	Connecticut	
Honda Inspiration Award winner	Corinne Carson	Basketball	Marymount	
DII Honda Athlete of the Year	Jennifer Clarkson	Basketball	Abilene Christian	
DIII Honda Athlete of the Year	Shelley Swan	Volleyball	Washington University in St. Louis	

== 1996–97 Winners and nominees ==
Sport	Winner	College	Finalists
Basketball	Chamique Holdsclaw	Tennessee	Ticha Penicheiro, Old Dominion; Kate Starbird, Stanford; Kara Wolters, Connecticut
Cross country	Amy Skieresz	Arizona	Joanna Deeter, Notre Dame; Kristine Jost, Villanova; Marie McMahon, Providence College
Field hockey	Cindy Werley	North Carolina	Kristen Holmes, Iowa; Katie Kauffman, Maryland; Tara Maguire, Penn State
Golf	Heather Bowie	Texas	Marisa Baena, Arizona; Shauna Estes, Georgia; Janice Moodie, San Jose State
Gymnastics	Kim Arnold	Georgia	Leah Brown, Georgia; Leah Homma, UCLA; Elena Tkacheva, Alaska; Meredith Willard, Alabama
Soccer	Cindy Daws	Notre Dame	Justi Baumgardt, Portland; Debbie Keller, North Carolina; Ele Johnson, Santa Clara; Deshaunne Running, Denver
Softball	Trinity Johnson	South Carolina	Jackie Aiken, Wisconsin; Nancy Evans, Arizona; Alison Johnsen, Arizona; Sara Pickering, Washington; Gena Weber, Cal Davis
Swimming & Diving	Kristine Quance	USC	Lindsay Benko, USC; Catherine Fox, Stanford; Martina Moravcova, SMU
Tennis	Lilia Osterloh	Stanford	Dawn Buth, Florida; Stephanie Nickitas, Florida; M.C. White, Florida
Track & Field	Amy Skieresz	Arizona	Kathy Butler, Wisconsin; Tiffany Lott, Brigham Young; Suzy Powell, UCLA
Volleyball	Angelica Liungquist	Hawai'i	Sarah Silvernail, Washington State; Kerri Walsh, Stanford; Vanessa Wouters, Ohio State

Award	Winner	Sport	College
Honda Cup Collegiate Woman Athlete of the Year	Cindy Daws	Soccer	Notre Dame
Honda Inspiration Award winner			
DII Honda Athlete of the Year	Kasey Morlock	Basketball	North Dakota State
DIII Honda Athlete of the Year	Taurena Johnson	Track & Field	Luther

== 1997–98 Winners and nominees ==
Sport	Winner	College	Finalists
Basketball	Chamique Holdsclaw	Tennessee	Murriel Page, Florida; Ticha Penicheiro, Old Dominion; Nykesha Sales, Connecticut
Cross country	Amy Skieresz	Arizona	Angela Graham, Boston College; Tiffany Speckman, Wisconsin; Julia Stamps, Stanford; Carrie Tollefson, Villanova
Field hockey	Cindy Werley	North Carolina	Kate Barber, North Carolina; Christine DeBow, Maryland; Amy McFarlane, Princeton
Golf	Kellee Booth	Arizona State	Christina Kuld, Tulsa; Grace Park, Arizona State; Jennifer Rosales, USC
Gymnastics	Kim Arnold	Georgia	Karen Lichey, Georgia; Stella Umeh, UCLA; Deni Boswell, Seattle Pacific; Lindsey Mazer, Ithaca College
Soccer	Sara Whalen	Connecticut	Justi Baumgardt, Portland; Lauren Johnson, UC San Diego; Holly Manthei, Notre Dame; Cindy Parlow, North Carolina
Softball	Nancy Evans	Arizona	Leah Braatz, Arizona; Sara Griffin, Michigan; Ali Viola, Nebraska
Swimming & Diving	Misty Hyman	Stanford	Kristy Kowal, Georgia; Martina Moravcova, SMU; Cristina Teuscher, Columbia
Tennis	Marissa Catlin	Georgia	Julie Scott, Stanford; Mirela Vladulescu, Alabama; Vanessa Webb, Duke
Track & Field	Amy Skieresz	Arizona	Tiffany Lott, Brigham Young; Tricia Smith, Pittsburgh; Teri Tunks, SMU
Volleyball	Kristin Folkl	Stanford	Bonnie Bremner, Penn State; Sarah Butler, West Texas A&M, Jennifer Martz, Washington; Misty May, Long Beach State; Terri Zemaitis, Penn State

Award	Winner	Sport	College	Picture
Honda Cup Collegiate Woman Athlete of the Year	Chamique Holdsclaw	Basketball	Tennessee	
Honda Inspiration Award winner	Heidi Anderson	Volleyball	Bentley	
DII Honda Athlete of the Year	Danielle Penner	Softball	California (PA)	
DIII Honda Athlete of the Year	Tiffany Speckman	Cross country	Wisconsin-Oshkosh	

== 1998–99 Winners and nominees ==
Sport	Winner	College	Finalists
Basketball	Stephanie White-McCarty	Purdue	Tamika Catchings, Tennessee; Chamique Holdsclaw, Tennessee; Rebecca Hammon, Colorado State
Cross country	Katie McGregor	Michigan	Kristen Gordon, Georgetown; Amy Skieresz, Arizona; Amy Yoder, Arizona
Field hockey	Mimi Smith	Old Dominion	Kristy Hale, Princeton; Sally Northcroft, Ball State; Nancy Pelligreen, North Carolina
Golf	Grace Park	Arizona State	Tami Durdin, Pepperdine; Shauna Estes, Florida; Candy Hannemann, Duke; Jennifer Rosales, USC
Gymnastics	Karin Lichey	Georgia	Theresa Kulikowski, Utah; Heidi Moneymaker, UCLA; Andree’ Pickens, Alabama
Soccer	Danielle Fotopoulos	Florida	Suzanne Eastman, Dartmouth College; Michelle French, Portland; Cindy Parlow, North Carolina
Softball	Danielle Henderson	Massachusetts	Tracy Conrad, Michigan; Stacey Nuveman, UCLA; Amanda Scott, Fresno State
Swimming & Diving	Martina Moravcova	SMU	Marylyn Chiang, California; Misty Hyman, Stanford; Kristy Kowal, Georgia
Tennis	Vanessa Webb	Duke	Marissa Irvin, Stanford; Zuzana Lešenarová, San Diego; Agnes Muzamel, Mississippi
Track & Field	Suziann Reid	Texas	Leigh Daniel, Texas Tech; Seilala Sua, UCLA; Trecia Smith, Pittsburgh
Volleyball	Misty May	Long Beach State	

Award	Winner	Sport	College	Picture
Honda Cup Collegiate Woman Athlete of the Year	Misty May	Volleyball	Long Beach State	
Honda Inspiration Award winner	Jeni Jones	Florida	Florida	
DII Honda Athlete of the Year	Melinda Almazan	Regis	Volleyball	
DIII Honda Athlete of the Year	Kelly Schade	Softball	Simpson	

== 1999–00 Winners and nominees ==
Sport	Winner	College	Finalists
Basketball	Shea Ralph	Connecticut	Svetlana Abrosimova, Connecticut; Tamika Catchings, Tennessee; Kelly Miller, Georgia
Cross country	Amy Yoder	Arkansas	Lilli Kleinmann, Arkansas; Hanne Lyngstad, Tulane; Erica Palmer, Wisconsin
Field hockey	Sally Northcroft	Ball State	Tracey Larson, Penn State; Tara Mounsey, Brown; Carla Tagliente, Maryland
Golf	Jenna Daniels	Arizona	Beth Bauer, Duke; Candie Kung, USC; Miriam Nagl, Arizona State
Gymnastics	Heather Brink	Nebraska	Sarah Cain, Michigan; Leisha Jenkins, Alaska; Heidi Moneymaker, UCLA
Soccer	Lorrie Fair	North Carolina	Mandy Clemens, Santa Clara; Janine Harispe, UC San Diego; Heather Mitts, Florida
Softball	Courtney Blades	Southern Mississippi	Jessica Mendoza, Stanford; Amanda Scott, Fresno State; Jennifer Spediacci, Washington; Audra Thomas, Kennesaw State
Swimming & Diving	Cristina Teuscher	Columbia	Jenny Keim, Miami; Kristy Kowal, Georgia; Courtney Shealy, Georgia
Tennis	Marissa Irvin	Stanford	Laura Granville, Stanford; Kristina Kraszewski, Washington; Sarah Walker, UCLA
Track & Field	Keisha Spencer	LSU	Miki Barber, South Carolina; Tracy O’Hara, UCLA; Seilala Sua, UCLA; Amy Yoder, Arkansas
Volleyball	Lauren Cacciamani	Penn State	Roberta Gehlke, UC Santa Barbara; Elsa Stegemann, University of the Pacific; Kerri Walsh, Stanford

Award	Winner	Sport	College
Honda Cup Collegiate Woman Athlete of the Year	Cristina Teuscher	Swimming & Diving	Columbia
Honda Inspiration Award winner	Johanna Olson	Cross country	Luther
DII Honda Athlete of the Year	Jayne Even	Basketball	North Dakota State
DIII Honda Athlete of the Year	Alia Fischer	Basketball	Washington University in St. Louis
