= Alia Fischer =

American basketball player (born 1977/8)

Personal information
- Born: c. 1977/1978
- Listed height: 6 ft 2 in (1.88 m)

Career information
- High school: John Marshall (Rochester, Minnesota)
- College: Washington (MO) (1996–2000)
- WNBA draft: 2000: undrafted
- Position: Center

Career highlights
- 3× NCAA DIII champion (1998–2000); 3× WBCA DIII Player of the Year (1998–2000); DIII Honda Athlete of the Year (2000); 2× Division III News Player of the Year (1999–2000); NCAA DIII Tournament Most Outstanding Player (2000); 3x NCAA DIII Kodak/WBCA First-team All-American (1998–2000); 2x NCAA DIII News First-team All-American (1999–2000); 3x NCAA DIII Basketball On-Line First-team All-American (1998–2000); 2x Columbus Multimedia First-team All-American (1999–2000); Columbus Multimedia Second-team All-American (1998); 2x First-team Academic All-America (1999–2000); Second-team Academic All-America (1998); Academic All-America Basketball Team Member of the Year (2000); 3x UAA Most Valuable Player (1998–2000); 3x All-UAA (1998–2000)

Alia Fischer (sometimes misspelled as Alia Fisher, born c. 1977/1978, later Alia Fischer Keys and Alia Keys) is an American former college basketball player for Washington (MO) (Wash U) of the NCAA Division III University Athletic Association (UAA). She was named to the NCAA Division III 25th Anniversary women's basketball team after earning three consecutive WBCA DIII Player of the Year awards for leading her Wash U teams to three consecutive NCAA Division III women's basketball tournament championships. Fischer was a three-time first team All-American and a three-time Academic All-America selection who earned Academic All-America Basketball Team Member of the Year as a senior. She was the first underclassman to earn WBCA DIII Player of the year and the first player to earn multiple WBCA DIII Player of the year awards. She was recognized as Honda Division III Woman Athlete of the Year and with a Today's Top VIII Award.

Fischer and her teams have set numerous records. She is the current all-time leading scorer (1974) and shot blocker (219) and former all-time leading rebounder (969) at Wash U. Fischer led Wash U in scoring, rebounding and shot blocks four consecutive years. She also led the team in steals as a sophomore. Fischer formerly held the school records for single-season and career field goal percentage. Her single-season free throws made (152) and single-season points (626) school records as well as her single-game blocked shots school record (7, shared) are unsurpassed. Fischer set the NCAA DIII record for consecutive field goals made and her team broke the women's college basketball record for consecutive wins. When her eligibility expired, Wash U had won 68 consecutive games and become the only women's college basketball team to achieve back-to-back undefeated seasons.

== High school ==
Fischer attended John Marshall High School in Rochester, Minnesota. As a senior for John Marshall, she was one of sixteen February 1, 1996, finalists (but not one of the five March 11 finalists) for Minnesota Miss Basketball. That year she led the Rockets to the 1996 Minnesota State High School League (MSHSL) Section 1 Class AA championship game where they lost to the defending Class AA state champion Mayo High School 68–58 despite a team-high 15 points from Fischer. She was one of 12 Outstate Minnesota All-star selectees for the annual series against the Minneapolis–Saint Paul metropolitan area All-stars. Fischer selected Division III Washington University over Division I offers such as Davidson. Wash U had made 7 consecutive and 8 of the last 9 NCAA Division III women's basketball tournaments. Fischer had applied to Wash U on a last minute whim, when her mother, Cristine Fischer, suggested she add the school to her list of form letters that she was sending out.

== College ==
=== Freshman year ===
As a freshman, Fischer scored 13 consecutive points to help Wash U close to a 43–39 deficit with 6:30 remaining in the first round of the 1997 NCAA Division III women's basketball tournament against Millikin University. Wash U lost 61–53 to finish at 19–7. It was Wash U's 9th NCAA appearance in 10 years. Fischer was an honorable mention All-UAA selection.

=== Sophomore year ===
Fischer posted a career-high 35 points in the Washington University Invitational in an 89–76 championship victory over Lake Forest. In January 23 and 25, 1998, games Fischer set the NCAA Division III record with 18 consecutive field goals made. On February 20, 1998, Wash U established a UAA record by defeating Brandeis University by a 64-point margin of victory, 97–33, as Fischer scored a team-high 20 points. In the February 22 UAA conference championship clinching game for seventh ranked Wash U against defending champion eleventh ranked NYU, Fischer posted 30 points and 14 rebounds in an 88–70 victory. Fischer was named UAA Player of the Year.

At the 1998 NCAA Division III women's basketball tournament, Fischer was on the all-sectional team following a 18-point/15-rebound (career high) performance in an 82–36 victory over Bridgewater College and a 16-point effort in a 53–45 come-from-behind victory over University of Wisconsin–Oshkosh. Then, in the national semifinal, Fischer made 4 early blocks to set the tone on her way to a 20-point/11-rebound/6 block effort in a 66–51 victory over Rowan University. Then in the championship game, she scored 28 points to secure the first NCAA Division III women's basketball tournament championship for Wash U against Southern Maine by a 77–69 margin. The team finished with a 28–2 record and the schools 8th overall national championship (7 in volleyball). Fischer earned all-tournament team honors. She was named a Kodak/WBCA All-American. She was also named second team GTE Academic All-America. Fischer was the first underclassman winner in the 16-year history of the DIII WBCA Player of the Year. Fischer's final statistics included 20.9 points per game, 9.6 rebounds per game and 65 total blocked shots.

=== Junior year ===
Fischer was named DIII News Preseason Player of the Year. By leading the Bears to a 25–0 start and a 33-game winning streak, Fischer earned UAA Player of the Year recognition a second time, becoming the first Bear to earn the award two years in a row. In the 1999 NCAA Division III women's basketball tournament, Fischer helped Wash U extend its streak to 34 straight by 21 points and five blocks (three in the first seven minutes) in a 75–38 victory over Wheaton College. In the third round game, the team's streak was in great peril when they surrendered a 49–31 lead to trail 60–59 late and eventually 62–61 inside the last minute against Capital University. Fischer was called to make a traditional three-point play with 31 seconds remaining to help get the team to overtime. Wash U prevailed 77–70 as Fischer contributed a season-high 29 points, 11 rebounds, 5 blocks and 3 steals. 16 points, 5 rebounds and 3 blocks by Fischer in the sectional championship game against University of Wisconsin–Oshkosh (for the 2nd year in a row in the national quarterfinals), helped secure a 56–55 victory after falling behind 18–3 in the first 12 minutes. Fischer earned all-sectional team honors. In the national semi-finals, Fischer posted 31 points and had seven rebounds to defeat Scranton 74–65. With only a 60–58 lead over the College of St. Benedict with a little over 4 minutes remaining, Wash U went on a 9–0 run, including 5 by Fischer, who contributed 19 points, 14 rebounds, and two steals, to achieve a 74–65 victory and a 30–0 record with 38 straight wins. She was an all-tournament team honoree. No most outstanding player was selected. Fischer was again named first team All-American and was named first team Academic All-America. She also was recognized as Division III Player of the Year after averaging 17 points and 8.3 rebounds. She was the first repeat DIII Player of the Year.

=== Senior year ===
During the offseason before her senior season, Fischer broke a bone in her wrist during a pick-up game. Her treatment entailed a permanent pin and a six-week temporary orthopedic cast followed by a splint. That offseason she interned for the 1999 St. Louis Rams. Despite her medical situation, she was named DIII News Preseason Player of the Year for a second year in a row.

Fischer became Wash U's all-time career leader in both blocks and rebounds on November 27, 1999, against Millikin University. Her 11 rebounds gave her 765 (surpassing Angie Kohnen's 757) and her 4 blocks gave her 172 (surpassing Michele Lewis' 170). On February 18, the Bears won their 61st consecutive win, setting the record for women's college basketball surpassing the 1994–95 Capital University Comets team's record of 60. Fischer tallied 22 points, 11 rebounds and 3 blocks in the 61–38 victory over Carnegie Mellon. After a senior night celebration and a 63rd consecutive victory over University of Chicago by a 70–33 margin, Fischer's senior class entered the 2000 NCAA Division III women's basketball tournament with a 102-9 overall record, 52-5 UAA conference record and a 10-1 NCAA tournament record. Fischer earned a third consecutive first-team All-UAA selection and UAA MVP recognition.

In the tournament, Wash U dispatched with Wisconsin-Oshkosh 67-46 behind 21 points from Fischer. Number one ranked Wash U defeated number two ranked Wisconsin-Eau Claire 81–63 with 25 points and 12 rebounds from Fischer. Although Baldwin-Wallace College held an early second half lead, the Bears won 86–71 as Tasha Rodgers scored a career-high 33 points while Fischer attracted the defensive attention. In the national semifinal, Wash U defeated Scranton 64–30 as Fischer posted 11 points. In the championship game, the Bears earned their 68th consecutive victory and achieved a 30–0 record, becoming only the second college basketball team to post consecutive undefeated seasons (joining John Wooden's 1971–72 & 1972–73 UCLA Bruins) by defeating Southern Maine 79–33 despite foul trouble 13 point from Fischer. Fisher was selected as most outstanding player and a member of the all-tournament team. Wash U would extend its win streak to 81 games (shy of college basketball's record of 88 set by the 1971–1974 UCLA Bruins men's basketball teams) before losing on January 16, 2001, in a non-conference road game at Fontbonne College. Thus, its 50 game home-win streak remained intact but shy of the 88 home game streak set by Division III Rust College women from 1982 to 1989. The Bears' conference game streak was also in effect. The team would lose to conference foe NYU on the road on February 2, 2001. The home win streak at the Washington University Field House would extend to 70 when they lost in the second round of the 2002 NCAA Division III women's basketball tournament 66–60 to Wisconsin-Stevens Point when leading scorer Robin Lahargoue was sidelined with a knee injury for the March 2, 2002, game. 81 consecutive wins stood as the NCAA women's basketball record until the 2010–11 Connecticut Huskies women's basketball team reached 90 in a row, relegating it to the NCAA Division III women's basketball record.

A French and business dual major with a 3.84 G.P.A., Fischer was named the 2000 Women's Basketball Academic All-America Team Member of the Year. She also won a third DIII national player of the year award after becoming the only player with multiple awards the year before. In college, she served as a volunteer tutor. Fischer received the Jostens Trophy along with Korey Coon of Illinois Wesleyan University as a co-winners of the Division III outstanding basketball student-athletes. Fischer was a finalist for 2000 NCAA Woman of the Year, losing out to Kristy Kowal. She was selected as the Honda DIII Woman Athlete of the Year. She was also recognized with a Today's Top VIII Award.

At the final four weekend of the 2000 NCAA Division I women's basketball tournament, the Women's Basketball Coaches Association held an all-star game featuring 17 NCAA Division I stars, as well as the national players of the year from NCAA Division II, Division III and National Association of Intercollegiate Athletics. Thus, Fischer was invited to the all-star game. Fischer scored 5 points in the game, which was held at the Palestra on April 1, 2000. Nonetheless, she was not invited to the April 25 WNBA pre-draft camp in Chicago. This prompted thoughts of basketball retirement and professional thoughts of working for either AmeriCorps or Habitat for Humanity rather than pursuing international basketball opportunities.

== Post graduate ==
In 2006, the NCAA decided to celebrate the 25th anniversary of its first Division II and Division III women's basketball championships by selecting a five-player, one-coach anniversary team in each division. Fischer was named to the NCAA Division III 25th Anniversary women's basketball team along with her coach Nancy Fahey and fellow Wash U teammate Tasha Rodgers. On January 26, 2007, she was inducted into the Washington University Sports Hall of Fame. By 2010, she was known as Alia Fischer Keys.
