= William Massey (disambiguation) =

William Massey (1856–1925) was prime minister of New Zealand.

William Massey may also refer to:

- Bill Massey (baseball) (1871–1940), baseball player in 1894
- Bill Massey (softball) (1936–2020), New Zealand softball player, coach and umpire
- William Massey (cricketer) (1846–1899), played cricket for Somerset and Lancashire
- William Massey (rower) (1817–1898), rowed and played cricket for Cambridge University
- William A. Massey (politician) (1856–1914), U.S. senator
- William A. Massey (mathematician) (born 1956), American mathematician
- William Clifford Massey (1917–1974), American anthropologist
- William Nathaniel Massey (1809–1881), British author and politician
- William S. Massey (1920–2017), American mathematician

== See also ==
- William Massie (1718–1751), Virginia planter and politician
