= Will Tschetter =

American basketball player (born 2003)

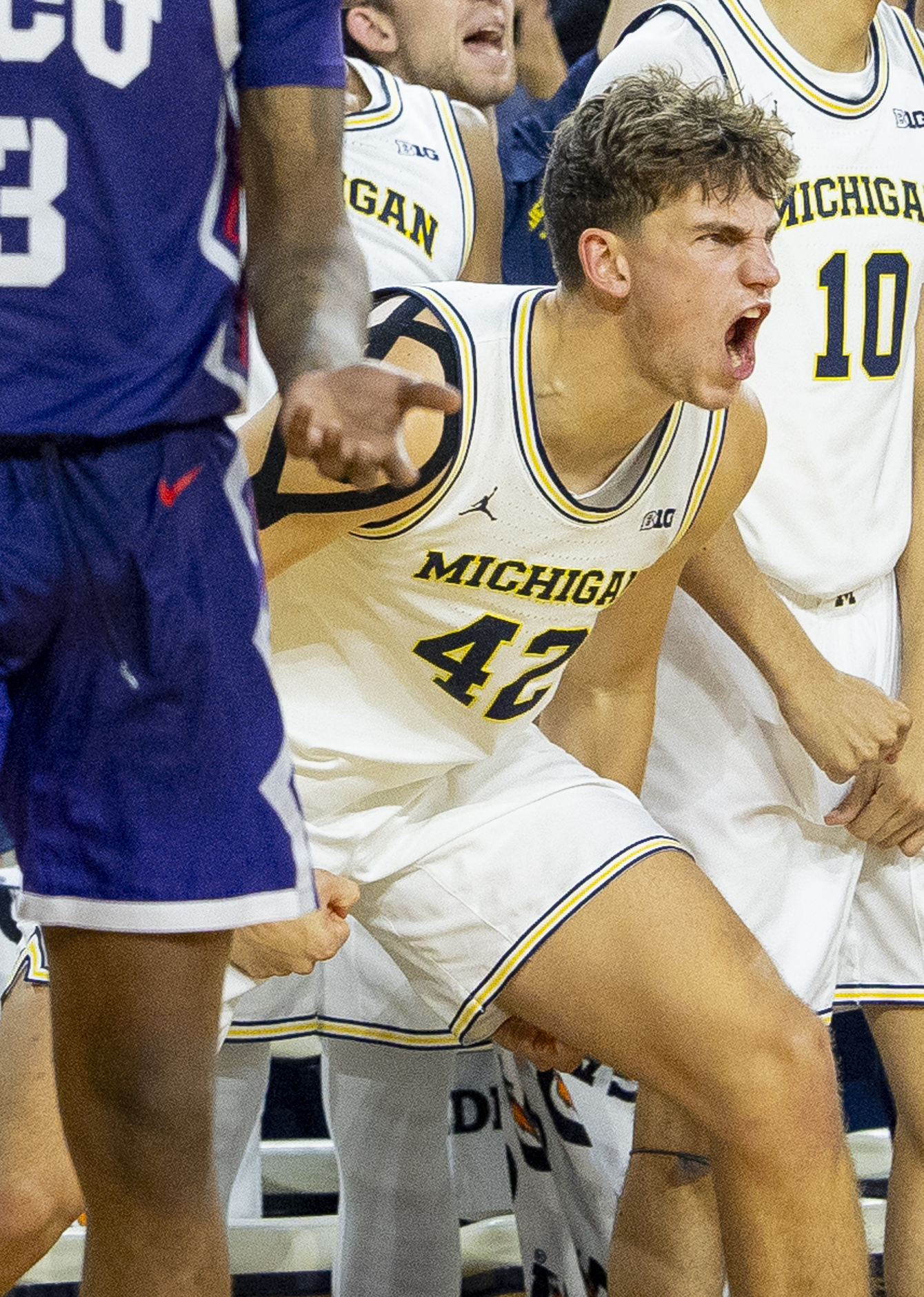
- Tschetter with the 2024–25 Michigan Wolverines

No. 7 – Cleveland Charge
- Position: Power forward
- League: NBA G League

Personal information
- Born: January 31, 2003 (age 23) Rochester, Minnesota, U.S.
- Listed height: 6 ft 8 in (2.03 m)
- Listed weight: 230 lb (104 kg)

Career information
- High school: Stewartville (Stewartville, Minnesota)
- College: Michigan (2022–2026)
- NBA draft: 2026: undrafted
- Playing career: 2026–present

Career history
- 2026: Warwick Senators
- 2026–present: Cleveland Charge

Career highlights
- NCAA champion (2026)

Will Tschetter (born January 31, 2003) is an American basketball player for the Cleveland Charge of the NBA G League. He played college basketball for the Michigan Wolverines, where he won an NCAA national championship in 2026. While playing for Stewartville High School, he led the state of Minnesota in scoring as a junior and finished as the runner-up for Minnesota Mr. Basketball behind Chet Holmgren as a senior.

== Early life ==
Tschetter was raised on a farm on the outskirts of the small town of Stewartville, Minnesota, in Southeast Minnesota. The town, which is a suburb of Rochester, Minnesota, has a population of 6,000, and the farm is a distance from central Stewartville. His family's 160-acre (0.65 km^{2}; 0.25 mi^{2}) farm with about 35 head of cattle is about 12 miles (19.3 km) south of Rochester. His grandfather bought the farm as rental property when his mother was in high school and his grandparents live in a separate residence on the farm, while his uncle owns an additional 80-acre (0.32 km^{2}; 0.13 mi^{2}) parcel nearby. His mother and father moved in when they landed engineering jobs at IBM in Rochester. Tschetter spent two years in China when his father was on assignment in Beijing before returning to the farm for sixth grade. Upon leaving for China in fourth grade, Tschetter was already 5 ft 10 in (1.78 m). While there, he attended International School of Beijing for 4th and 5th grade.

Tschetter's mom coached his eighth-grade travel team and was the Stewartville freshmen coach as of the 2020–21 season. Tschetter began trumpet studies in fourth grade and switched to french horn as a freshman. He was a member of the school marching band, despite interference from his athletic commitments. He performed yearly with the band at the Minnesota State Fair and in band competitions.

== High school career ==
Before his freshman year, he joined the Minnesota Heat AAU boys' basketball program, coached by Johnny Tauer, who encouraged his outside shot. He was a straight-A student in high school with the exception of an A-minus in Spanish as a sophomore. By July 2019, following his sophomore basketball season, Tschetter's only offer was a Division II school. He took an official visit to attend the January 19, 2020, game between North Dakota State and North Dakota. Tschetter had a 5:30 routine that included making 100 three-point shots every day. Most teams double-teamed or triple-teamed him, but some good schools felt they could handle him with single coverage, often resulting in his big games; for instance, he posted 50 points against Columbia Heights. As a junior, Tschetter led the state in scoring average with 33.4 points per game and earned second team all-state recognition from the Associated Press, yet by April 2020, he only had mid-major interest. Tschetter had intended to make his college choice in April 2020 before the COVID-19 pandemic in the United States. However, the resulting lockdown led to AAU event cancellations and in-person recruiting bans. Talent evaluations were suddenly based on film analysis and review. Tschetter had to build interest by tape. Michigan assistant coach Phil Martelli had initiated contact to request game film.

Because he was from a remote area and did not play for an AAU team that participated in the shoe-sponsored circuits, Tschetter remained relatively unknown until Rivals.com published a May 14, 2020, story on him. By May 25, Tschetter had offers from NDSU, Appalachian State, Colorado State, James Madison, Loyola Chicago, Northern Iowa, South Dakota, Toledo, William & Mary, Wyoming and Richmond and strong interest from Arkansas, Minnesota and Michigan. Tschetter was also the starting quarterback for Stewartville. As a junior, he threw for 1,429 yards and 15 touchdowns in nine games. Minnesota Golden Gophers football recruited him as a tight end. While Mark Dantonio was the head coach of Michigan State Spartans football, they were also interested in him as a tight end. Other Big Ten Conference football programs recruited him as well. However, some of the tight end transition conversations extended to his eventually performing as an offensive lineman, which did not interest him. While Tschetter was still fielding offers, the stay-at-home ban was lifted and he invited the Cincinnati-bound Class of 2020 Madsen twins (Gabe and Mason) to practice. Tschetter also competed in the discus throw in high school.

Michigan zoom recruiting entailed a series of virtual meetings. Tschetter, who had a 3.9 GPA, was enticed by Michigan's academics. For basketball, Tschetter's first Power Five conference offer came from Arkansas coach Eric Musselman. On June 1, he got his first Big Ten Conference basketball scholarship offer from Michigan. Hours later, Nebraska and Minnesota followed, and Iowa made an offer on June 23. By late June, his ranking was up to 149 in the 247Sports composite rankings. During the Covid pandemic, his June schedule was packed with zoom recruiting meetings but no official campus visits were allowed before August 31. So Tschetter and his mom drove 588 miles (946.3 km) from Stewartville to Ann Arbor to visit the University of Michigan campus during the quiet of lockdowns for a July 4 road trip. Tschetter could only interface with head coach Juwan Howard and assistant coach Martelli via Zoom. He wanted to wrap up his recruiting before school resumed and decided to commit on July 5. However, because he had no social media accounts, his announcement came from the Stewartville High School boys' basketball Twitter account the next day He had tried Snapchat in high school briefly but found it too distracting. Although Tschetter had no social media accounts, he had on occasion scrolled through his mother's Twitter account and seen the Stewartville basketball account, with its 800 followers; he wanted the experience of an official social media announcement. Stewartville assistant coach Brad Vaught made it happen. His mother was also an assistant coach at Stewartville for coach Adam Girtman. Tschetter finished his high school career with a total of 2,467 points scored.

The 2020 MSHSL spring track & field championships were cancelled, due to the COVID pandemic. At the 2021 MSHSL Class 1A state championships, Tschetter won the discus throw with a distance of 175 ft 7 in (53.52 m).

In basketball, Tschetter led Stewartsville to a state runner-up finish in the March 25, 2021, MSHSL Class 2A state championships. They lost to Caledonia High School and finished with an 18–4 record. Subsequently, Tschetter was named one of five finalists for Minnesota Mr. Basketball along with Lamar Grayson, Chet Holmgren, Andrew Morgan and Francis Nwaokorie. At the time, he was listed as third in the state in scoring average (30.7) and first in total points (643), to go along with 11.3 rebounds per game. Tschetter had led the state with a scoring average over 33 points per game the prior season. When Holmgren, who also won national player of the year awards, was announced as the winner, placement for the other finalists was not announced. However, his University of Michigan official bio asserts he was runner-up. The Minnesota Basketball Coaches Association named Tschetter to the Class AA MBCA Academic All State Team.

College recruiting
| Name | Hometown | School | Height | Weight | Commit date |
|---|---|---|---|---|---|
| Will Tschetter; PF | Stewartville, MN | Stewartville | 6 ft 8 in (2.03 m) | 225 lb (102 kg) | Jul 6, 2020 |
| Will Tschetter; PF | Recruit ratings: Rivals: 247Sports: ESPN: (81) | | | | |
Overall recruit ranking: Rivals: 51 247Sports: 44 ESPN: 40
Note: In many cases, Scout, Rivals, 247Sports, On3, and ESPN may conflict in their listings of height and weight.; In these cases, the average was taken. ESPN grades are on a 100-point scale.; Sources: "Michigan 2021 Basketball Commitments". Rivals.; "2021 Michigan Wolverines Recruiting Class". ESPN.; "2021 Team Ranking". Rivals.

== College career ==
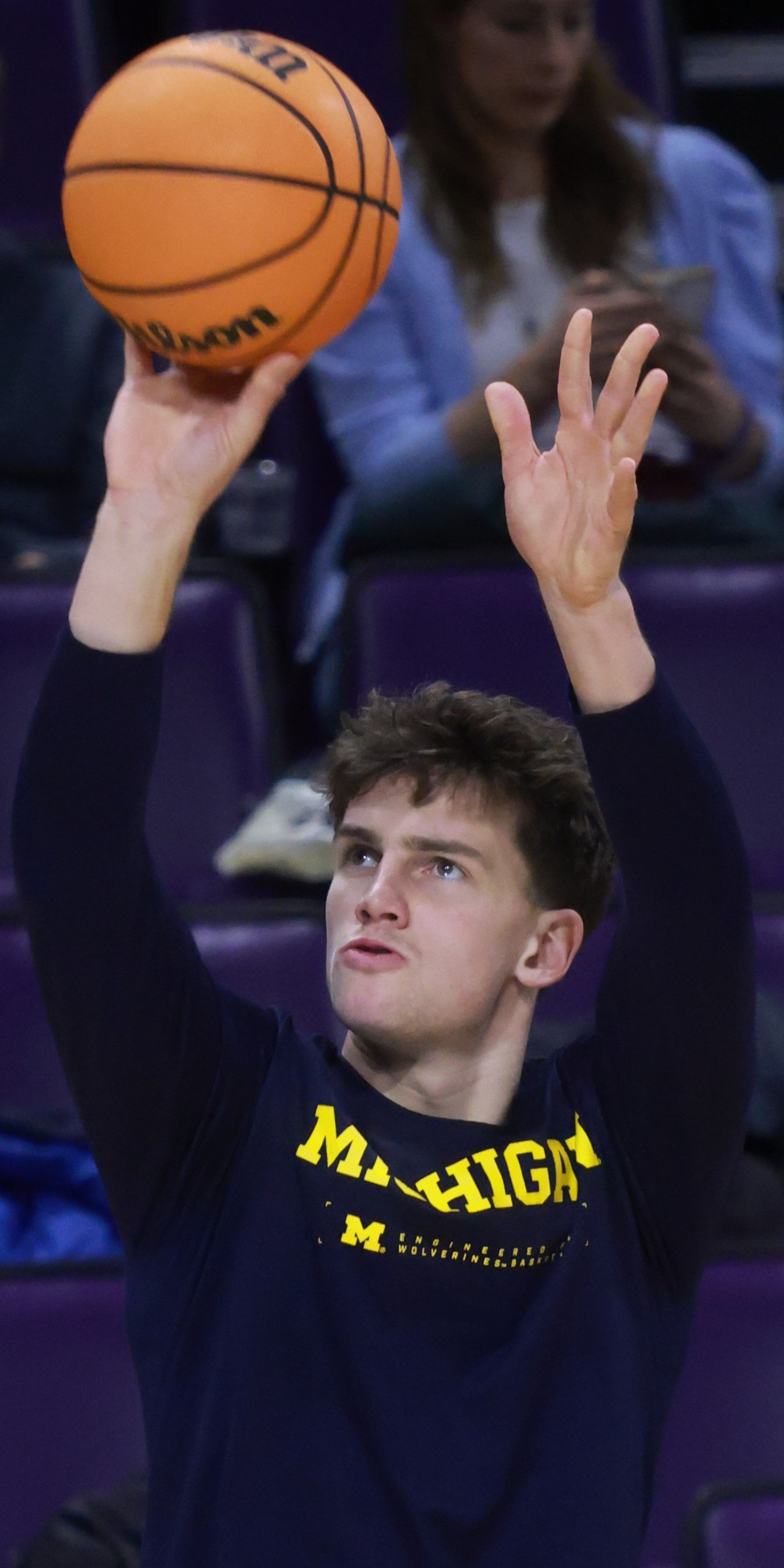
Tschetter for the 2025–26 Michigan Wolverines

Tschetter enrolled at the University of Michigan as a part of the top-ranked national recruiting class in 2021, along with Caleb Houstan, Moussa Diabaté, Kobe Bufkin, Frankie Collins and Isaiah Barnes. As a true freshman, Tschetter played less than 5 minutes for Michigan, playing only on November 5, in an exhibition game against Wayne State. The coaching staff talked with him and his family and redshirted him for the remainder of the season.

The following season, as a redshirt freshman he earned a reputation as a spark plug. He averaged 10.7 minutes of playing time, starting eight of 27 games played for the 2022–23 Wolverines. In his first career start on February 14, 2023, Tschetter missed two free throws with Michigan down by two with 1:17 remaining. Michigan went on to lose to Wisconsin by five points. He scored four points, five rebounds and had two assists. Following his redshirt freshman season, he did an internship on a bison ranch.

Tschetter entered his redshirt sophomore season as the only member of his signing class to remain at Michigan. In his first two games, he made all six of his three-point shots and was 11 of 13 from the field, including scoring a career-high eight points in the seasons opener against UNC Asheville on November 7, 2023. He then set a new career high with 20 points against Youngstown State on November 10. He shot 8 of 8 from the field (4 of 4 on three-point shots).

The 2023–24 Michigan Wolverines endured an 8–24 season, finishing last in the Big Ten with a 3–17 conference record. On March 15, 2024, Michigan fired head coach Juwan Howard, replacing him with Dusty May, whom they hired on March 23. On April 5, Tschetter became the first tenured Wolverine to announce he would return for the 2024–25 team. He completed his undergraduate curriculum in three years, earning a bachelor's degree in earth and environmental science.

On January 16, 2025, Tschetter posted what was at the time a season-high 15 points when Michigan visited the Minnesota Golden Gophers at Williams Arena, about 100 miles from his hometown. Michigan lost in overtime. On February 5 against the Oregon Ducks, in the victory he led the Wolverines with a season-high 17 points in 17 minutes off the bench. In the championship game of the 2025 Big Ten tournament, Tschetter connected on two second half three-point shots to stop Wisconsin’s momentum, helping lead Michigan to a Big Ten championship one season after finishing in last place in the conference.

In his debut for the 2025–26 Wolverines on November 3, 2025, against Oakland, he posted 16 points with four three-point shots. The team earned the championship at the 2026 NCAA Division I men's basketball tournament and tied the Big Ten Conference record for single-season wins.

== Professional career ==
=== Australia ===
On April 15, 2026, Tschetter signed with the Warwick Senators of the NBL1 West in Australia for the 2026 season. In his debut for the Senators on April 25, he recorded 25 points, 13 rebounds, three steals and two assists in a 103–89 win over the Joondalup Wolves. He averaged 28.1 points and 7.5 rebounds with the Senators in Australia.

=== Portland ===
On July 4, 2026, it was reported that Tschetter departed Warwick to join the Portland Trail Blazers for the 2026 NBA Summer League. He participated in their minicamp, but did not play in any games for Portland. When the Blazers announced a 12-man summer league roster on July 1, Tschetter was not included. In October 2026, he made the 16-man Rip City Remix training camp roster for the NBA G League. He did not appear in the season opening 13-man lineup.

=== Cleveland ===
After being released by the Rip City Remix, Tschetter was acquired by the Cleveland Charge of the NBA G League.

== Personal life ==
Tschetter was born the son of Kasey Morlock and Garth Tschetter. Morlock is the all-time leading scorer in North Dakota State Bison women's basketball history (2233 points), a three-time All-American, three-time NCAA Division II national champion and was Minnesota Miss Basketball. His father made 34 receptions and 3 touchdowns as a wide receiver for North Dakota State Bison football. Garth was listed as 6 ft 1 in (1.85 m) as a senior in high school. His younger brother Henry (class of 2025, 6 ft 4 in (1.93 m)) has committed to play NCAA Division III basketball for Saint John's University in Collegeville, Minnesota, and he has a second brother Pete (class of 2027).
