= Bill Massey (softball) =

New Zealand softball player (1936–2020)

Personal information
- Full name: William Massey
- Born: 10 September 1936
- Died: 2 July 2020 (aged 83) Lower Hutt, New Zealand

Sport
- Sport: Softball
- Position: Pitcher
- Retired: 1968

Achievements and titles
- World finals: 1966, 1968

William Massey (10 September 1936 – 2 July 2020) was a New Zealand softball pitcher, coach and umpire. He played at two world championships, winning bronze with the New Zealand team in 1966.

Playing for the Railways club in the Hutt Valley, Massey pitched his team to six national interclub titles between 1958 and 1967. During the same period he won eight national interprovincial titles representing Hutt Valley. He was known as "the man with the golden arm". He represented New Zealand at the first two men's world championship softball tournaments, at Mexico City in 1966 and Oklahoma City in 1968, with his team placing third in 1966. He retired as a player after the 1968 tournament, but went on to coach the Railways club and mentor women's pitcher Gina Weber. He also became a leading softball umpire.

Massey died at his home in Lower Hutt on 2 July 2020.

== Halls of Fame ==
Massey was an inaugural inductee into the Softball New Zealand Hall of Fame in 1988, and was inducted into the New Zealand Sports Hall of Fame in 1997. In 2019, he was inducted into the International Softball Federation Hall of Fame.

== Honorific eponym ==
The main softball diamond at Fraser Park in Lower Hutt is named the Massey–Nunns diamond, in honour of Massey and his long-time catcher, Terry Nunns.
