= Susan King Borchardt =

American basketball player (born 1981)

Susan King
Personal information
- Born: July 27, 1981 (age 44) Richfield, Minnesota, U.S.
- Listed height: 5 ft 7 in (1.70 m)
- Listed weight: 160 lb (73 kg)

Career information
- High school: Academy of Holy Angels (Richfield, Minnesota)
- College: Stanford (2001–2005)
- WNBA draft: 2005: undrafted
- Position: Guard

Career history
- 2005: Minnesota Lynx

Career highlights
- Minnesota Miss Basketball (2000)
- Stats at Basketball Reference

Susan King Borchardt (born Susan King on July 27, 1981) is an American professional women's basketball player.

She was born in Richfield, Minnesota and grew up in a family of collegiate basketball players. Her father, Gary King, played at the University of Nebraska at Kearney. Her brother, Stephen, played at Ohio University.

From 1994 to 2000, she attended the Academy of Holy Angels, a Catholic coeducational high school in Richfield, Minnesota, where she became the first and only 7th grader in school history to play on the varsity girls' basketball team.

From 2000 to 2005, she played the point guard position on the women's team at Stanford University.

During her freshman season, she injured the anterior cruciate ligament (ACL) in her right knee, and missed the final 21 games of the year. While recuperating, she met her future husband, Curtis Borchardt, then a sophomore on Stanford's men's basketball team, who had just suffered a stress fracture in his right foot and missed the final 14 games of his season. Eventually, they married in August 2003.

After graduating, Curtis joined the Utah Jazz of the National Basketball Association (NBA) while Susan spent her senior year at Stanford.

After graduating with a degree in psychology, she was selected by the Minnesota Lynx during the 2005 WNBA draft. She saw limited time with the Lynx, playing in only three games during the regular season before being waived by the team.

== Career statistics ==
=== College ===
Legend
GP	Games played	GS	Games started	MPG	Minutes per game	RPG	Rebounds per game
APG	Assists per game	SPG	Steals per game	BPG	Blocks per game	PPG	Points per game
TO	Turnovers per game	FG%	Field-goal percentage	3P%	3-point field-goal percentage	FT%	Free-throw percentage
**Bold**	Career best	°	League leader

Year	Team	GP	Points	FG%	3P%	FT%	RPG	APG	SPG	BPG	PPG
2001-02	Stanford	2	7	22.2%	25.0%	**100.0%**	**3.0**	2.5	**1.0**	-	3.5
2002-03	Stanford	30	190	39.0%	32.7%	81.1%	1.3	1.5	0.9	0.1	6.3
2003-04	Stanford	**34**	**289**	47.9%	43.7%	91.4%	1.2	**2.6**	0.9	0.1	8.5
2004-05	Stanford	20	172	**53.0%**	**44.9%**	85.0%	1.9	1.8	0.9	0.1	**8.6**
Career		86	658	45.7%	40.1%	86.2%	1.4	2.0	0.9	0.1	7.7

=== WNBA ===
==== Regular season ====
Year	Team	GP	GS	MPG	FG%	3P%	FT%	RPG	APG	SPG	BPG	TO	PPG
2005	Minnesota	3	0	5.7	.000	.000	.750	0.3	0.3	0.0	0.3	0.0	1.0
Career	1 year, 1 team	3	0	5.7	.000	.000	.750	0.3	0.3	0.0	0.3	0.0	1.0
