= Angel Robinson (basketball, born 1989) =

American basketball player (born 1989)

Personal information
- Born: May 13, 1989 (age 37) Saint Paul, Minnesota, U.S.
- Listed height: 6 ft 0 in (1.83 m)
- Listed weight: 160 lb (73 kg)

Career information
- High school: Central (Saint Paul, Minnesota)
- College: Marquette (2007–2011)
- WNBA draft: 2011: 2nd round, 22nd overall pick
- Drafted by: New York Liberty
- Position: Forward

Career highlights
- First-team All-Big East (2011); Big East All-Freshman Team (2008); Minnesota Miss Basketball (2007)
- Stats at Basketball Reference

Angel Robinson (born May 13, 1989) is a Minnesota native basketball forward. She registered in 134 games and started all but two games of her career. Robinson completed her career at MU as the only player in program history with over 1,500 points, 500 assists and 250 steals. She ranks in the top 12 in eight career statistical categories, including an MU-record 134 career games played. Robinson was selected First Team selection and WBCA All-America Team finalist. She was also a two time ALL-BIG EAST First Team selection and a member of the 2008 ALL- BIG EAST Freshman team. The American forward was drafted 22nd overall by the New York Liberty in 2011 WNBA Draft and traded to the Minnesota Lynx, who released her before the season began. She also signed a one-year deal to play for Ceyhan-Belediyesi SC in the Adana Province of Turkey. Robinson spent time playing for Telge in Sweden and currently plays in Switzerland.

== Marquette University ==
Career Notes: Played in 134 career games and started in all but two games of her career, including the last 105 straight ... First player in Marquette history with over 1,500 points, 500 assists and 250 steals ... Ranks in the top 12 in eight career statistical categories, including a MU-record 134 career games played ... Stands second on the career steals (277), free throws made (434) and free throws attempted (600) lists, third in assists (570), sixth in points (1,699), eighth in field goals made (587) and 12th in rebounds (640) ... Drafted 22nd overall by the New York Liberty in the 2011 WNBA Draft.

== Marquette statistics ==
Legend
| GP | Games played | GS | Games started | MPG | Minutes per game |
| FG% | Field goal percentage | 3P% | 3-point field goal percentage | FT% | Free throw percentage |
| RPG | Rebounds per game | APG | Assists per game | SPG | Steals per game |
| BPG | Blocks per game | PPG | Points per game | **Bold** | Career high |

| Year | Team | GP | Points | FG% | 3P% | FT% | RPG | APG | SPG | BPG | PPG |
|---|---|---|---|---|---|---|---|---|---|---|---|
| 2007-08 | Marquette | **35** | 399 | 38.7 | **33.3** | 69.7 | 4.3 | 3.9 | **2.5** | 0.4 | 11.4 |
| 2008-09 | Marquette | 33 | **459** | 36.9 | 30.0 | 73.3 | 5.0 | 3.7 | 1.3 | **0.4** | **13.9** |
| 2009-10 | Marquette | 33 | 392 | 36.1 | 24.0 | 70.8 | 4.5 | 4.7 | 2.1 | 0.3 | 11.9 |
| 2010-11 | Marquette | 33 | 449 | **42.7** | 28.2 | **75.3** | **5.3** | **4.8** | 2.4 | **0.4** | 13.6 |
| Career | | 134 | 1699 | 38.5 | 28.7 | 72.3 | 4.8 | 4.3 | 2.1 | 0.4 | 12.7 |

== High School Basketball ==
Prior to Marquette: 2007 Minnesota Miss Basketball ... Averaged 16.3 points, 5.3 assists and 4.9 steals per game while leading St. Paul Central to the Minnesota AAAA State Championship and an undefeated season in 2006-07 ... Set the Minnesota State steals record with 776 for her career ... Was a first team all-state selection in 2007 as well as the Minneapolis Star Tribune's Metro Player of the Year ... Ranked as high as No. 24 (overall prospect) by All-Star Girls Report and the fourth best point guard overall by the publication ... No. 49 by scout.com ... Participated in the Adidas Top 10 All-American Camp ... Also lettered as a member of the cross country and track teams.

== Awards and honors ==
- 2013 Eurobasket.com All-Swedish Damligan All-Imports Team
- 2013 Eurobasket.com All-Swedish Damligan Honorable Mention
- 2013 Swedish Damligan Regular Season Champion
- 2011 Drafted to the Minnesota Lynx
- 2010-11 All-BIG EAST First Team Selection
- 2009-10 All-BIG EAST Second Team Selection
- 2008-09 All-BIG EAST Second Team Selection
- 2008 NIT Champion
- 2007-08 All-BIG EAST Freshman Team Selection
- 2007 First Team All-State Selection
- Minneapolis Star Tribune's Metro Player of the Year
