= Ocean State Open =

Golf tournament formerly on the LPGA Tour

The Ocean State Open was a golf tournament on the LPGA Tour from 1988 to 1989. It was played at the Alpine Country Club in Cranston, Rhode Island.

== Winners ==
Mitsubishi Motors Ocean State Open

- 1989 Tina Barrett

Ocean State Open

- 1988 Patty Jordan
