= Patty Jordan =

American professional golfer (born 1959)

Personal information
- Nationality: United States
- Born: December 2, 1959 (age 66) Buffalo, New York, U.S.
- Height: 5 ft 8.5 in (1.74 m)

Career
- Sport: Golf
- College: Wake Forest University
- Status: Professional
- Former tours: LPGA Tour (1986–1999); Futures Tour
- Professional wins: 2

Number of wins by tour
- LPGA Tour: 1
- Epson Tour: 1

Best results in LPGA major championships
- Chevron Championship: T47: 1995
- Women's PGA C'ship: T51: 1989
- U.S. Women's Open: CUT: 1984, 1987, 1996
- du Maurier Classic: T22: 1995

Patty Jordan (born December 2, 1959) is an American professional golfer who played on the LPGA Tour.

Jordan won once on the LPGA Tour in 1988.

== Professional wins ==
=== LPGA Tour wins (1) ===
No.	Date	Tournament	Winning score	Margin of victory	Runners-up
1	Aug 28, 1988	Ocean State Open	−5 (73-68-70=211)	2 strokes	(United States) Lynn Adams (United States) Jill Briles-Hinton (United States) Mitzi Edge (United States) Sandra Palmer (United States) Joan Pitcock (United States) Margaret Ward

=== Futures Tour wins (1) ===
- 1984 Sarasota Stingers Classic
