= WBCA Player of the Year =

NCAA Division II and Division III women's college basketball award

The Women's Basketball Coaches Association Player of the Year award is presented annually to the best women's college basketball players in NCAA Division II and Division III as voted by the WBCA membership. From 1983 to 2000, the award was also given to the best player in Division I. The award was first presented in 1983. The award was presented by Champion from 1983 to 1994, by Rawlings from 1995 to 2002, and by State Farm from 2003 to 2015.

== Winners ==
Player (X)	Denotes the number of times the player has won the award

=== Division I ===
Year	Player	College	Position	Class
1983	Anne Donovan	Old Dominion	C	Senior
1984	Janice Lawrence	Louisiana Tech	F	Senior
1985	Cheryl Miller	USC	F/C	Junior
1986	Cheryl Miller (2)	USC	F/C	Senior
1987	Katrina McClain	Georgia	F	Senior
1988	Michelle Edwards	Iowa	G	Senior
1989	Clarissa Davis	Texas	F	Senior
1990	Venus Lacy	Louisiana Tech	C	Senior
1991	Dawn Staley	Virginia	PG	Junior
1992	Dawn Staley (2)	Virginia	PG	Senior
1993	Sheryl Swoopes	Texas Tech	G/F	Senior
1994	Lisa Leslie	USC	C	Senior
1995	Rebecca Lobo	Connecticut	C	Senior
1996	Saudia Roundtree	Georgia	G	Junior
1997	Kate Starbird	Stanford	F	Senior
1998	Chamique Holdsclaw	Tennessee	F	Junior
1999	Chamique Holdsclaw (2)	Tennessee	F	Senior
2000	Tamika Catchings	Tennessee	F	Junior

=== Division II ===
Year	Player	College
1983	Jackie White	Cal Poly Pomona
1984	Carla Eades	Central Missouri
1985	Rosie Jones	Central Missouri
1986	Vickie Mitchell	Cal Poly Pomona
1987	Debra Larsen	Cal Poly Pomona
1988	Vanessa Wells	West Tex. A&M
1989	Cathy Gooden	Cal Poly Pomona
1990	Crystal Hardy	Delta St.
1991	Tracy Saunders	Norfolk St.
1992	Mindy Young	Pitt.-Johnstown
1993	Yolanda Griffith	Fla. Atlantic
1994	Tammy Greene	Philadelphia
1995	Sheri Kleinsasser	North Dakota
1996	Jennifer Clarkson	Abilene Christian
1997	Kasey Morlock	North Dakota St.
1998	Jenny Crouse	North Dakota
1999	Jenny Crouse (2)	North Dakota
2000	Jayne Even	North Dakota St.
2001	Theresa LeCuyer	North Dakota
2002	Lauri McIntosh	Cal Poly Pomona
2003	Becky Siembak	California (PA)
2004	Mandy Koupal	South Dakota
2005	Candice Allen	Cal Poly Pomona
2006	Jennifer Harris	Washburn
2007	Erika Quigley	St. Cloud St
2008	Johannah Leedham	Franklin Pierce
2009	Katie Cezat	Hillsdale
2010	Johannah Leedham (2)	Franklin Pierce
2011	Shannon McKever	Lander
2012	Kari Daugherty	Ashland
2013	Kari Daugherty (2)	Ashland
2014	Lauren Battista	Bentley
2015	Shareta Brown	Wayne St. (MI)
2016	Kiana Johnson	Virginia Union
2017	Kelly Moten	Emporia St.
2018	Jodi Johnson	Ashland
2019	Hailey Diestelkamp	Drury University
2020	Hailey Diestelkamp (2)	Drury University
2021	Paige Robinson	Drury University
2022	Julianne Sutton	North Georgia
2023	Brooke Olson	Minnesota Duluth
2024	Samantha Pirosko	Gannon
2025	Nala Williams	Cal State Dominguez Hills
2026	Natalie Bremer	Minnesota State–Mankato

=== Division III ===
Year	Player	College
1983	Margie O'Brien	Clark (MA)
1984	Page Lutz	Elizabethtown
1985	Deanna Kyle	Scranton
1986	Jane Meyer	Elizabethtown
1987	Shelley Parks	Scranton
1988	Jessica Beachy	Concordia-M'head
1989	Kirsten Dumford	Stanislaus St.
1990	Susan Heidt	St. John Fisher
1991	Ann Gilbert	Oberlin
1992	Kathy Beck	Moravian
1993	Laurie Trow	St. Thoman (MN)
1994	Laura Schmelzer	Capital
1995	Emilie Hanson	Central (IA)
1996	Wendy Wangerin	Wis.-Oshkosh
1997	Connie Carson	Marymount (VA)
1998	Alia Fischer	Washington-St. Louis
1999	Alia Fischer (2)	Washington-St. Louis
2000	Alia Fischer (3)	Washington-St. Louis
2001	Tasha Rodgers	Washington-St. Louis
2002	Meredith Eisenhut	St. Lawrence
2003	Kendra Anderson	Hardin-Simmons
2004	Allison Coleman	Eastern Conn. St.
2005	Amanda Nechuta	Wis.-Stevens Point
2006	Megan Silva	Randolph-Macon
2007	Eileen Flaherty	Bowdoin
2008	Meia Daniels	Howard Payne
2009	Hillary Klimowicz	TCNJ
2010	Carrie Snikkers	Hope
2011	Jaclyln Daigneault	Amherst
2012	Caroline Stedman	Amherst
2013	Samantha Barber	Wis.-Stevens Point
2014	Sydney Moss	Thomas More
2015	Sydney Moss (2)	Thomas More
2016	Sydney Moss (3)	Thomas More
2017	Ali Doswell	Amherst
2018	Kate Kerrigan	Bowdoin
2019	Madison Temple	Thomas More
2020	Maddie Hasson	Bowdoin
2021	Kendall Sosa	Illinois Wesleyan
2022	Kenedy Schoonveld	Hope College
2023	Morgan Morrison	Smith College
2024	Natalie Bruns	NYU
2025	Natalie Bruns (2)	NYU
2026	Caroline Peper	NYU

== See also ==
- List of sports awards honoring women
