= Jennifer Martz =

American volleyball player (born 1977)

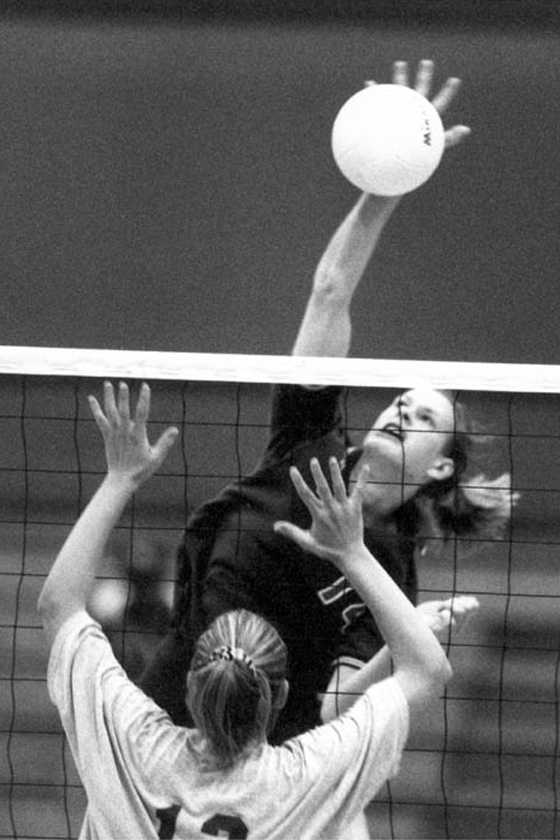
- Jennifer Martz, 1997 (junior season)

Personal information
- Born: July 13, 1977 (age 47)

Jennifer Martz (born July 13, 1977) is an American former volleyball player for Washington University in St. Louis of the NCAA Division III University Athletic Association (UAA). Martz was the 1997 American Volleyball Coaches Association (AVCA) Division III Player of the Year, a four-time AVCA All-American (three-time first team), two-time NCAA Division III national champion, a 1998 second team Academic All-America selection, three-time UAA Player of the Year and the 1999 NCAA Division III Missouri Woman Athlete of the Year.

Martz formerly shared the NCAA Division III single-match hitting percentage record and has the second highest career hitting percentage in NCAA Division III history as of 2023. She led the NCAA Division III in hitting percentage as a junior. Martz continues to hold many Wash U individual records, including single-season and career kills and career blocks.

== Early life ==
As a junior middle hitter in high school for Ladue Horton Watkins High School, Martz (then listed at 5 ft 11 in (1.80 m)) was named to the 1993 St. Louis Post-Dispatch all-metro volleyball third team.

== College ==
=== Freshman year ===
By the time she joined the Washington University Bears, the team was very successful. When she travelled with the team to earn all-tournament team honors at the Thomas More Skyline Chili Classic in Crestview Hills, Kentucky at the beginning of September 1995, it was for contributing to the team's 65th and 66th consecutive match victories. The team had won the previous four NCAA Division III women's volleyball tournament as well as five of the previous six. Despite the fact that the team had graduated two All-Americans from the previous year (Amy Albers and Anne Quenette) and was half composed of players with no collegiate experience, they were the preseason number one ranked team based on national voting of volleyball coaches. Martz earned honorable mention All-UAA recognition for her freshman season.

At the 1995 NCAA Division III women's volleyball tournament, against Southwestern University Martz had 8 kills and a team-high 3 blocks. Against the Trinity Tigers, Martz had 11 kills and 6 blocks. Then, she posted 15 kills against number one ranked Juniata College to become the first Wash U freshman to be named all-region. At the final four banquet, she was named to the AVCA All-American 2nd team, becoming the first freshman Bear to be named All-American. Martz recorded the match-winning kill against Ithaca College in the semifinals. In the championship 5-game match victory against California Lutheran University, Martz recorded 25 kills, including 10 in the game 1 win. The win gave Wash U its fifth consecutive national championship. She was named to the 5-person All-tournament team.

=== Sophomore year ===
Martz earned AVCA Division III national player of the week recognition for the week of September 9, 1996, when she hit .485 with 60 kills in four winning matches against Division II opposition. She tied the school match hitting percentage record with a 100% rate for her 10 kills against New York University on September 22, 1996. At the time, it earned her a share of the NCAA DIII hitting percentage record. It remained unsurpassed until Beth Freeman achieved 100% single-match hitting percentage with 12 kills in 12 attacks for Carleton College on September 14, 2001. She was named UAA Player of the Year, marking the 8th consecutive year a Wash U athlete earned the award. In the 1996 NCAA Division III women's volleyball tournament, Martz helped Wash U advance to the final four by contributing to wins against Savannah College of Art and Design (team-high 16 kills), Emory University (team-high 7 kills), and State University of New York at Cortland (13 kills, 57.9%). Prior to the final four Martz was named to the AVCA All-American first team. Martz posted 16 kills (51.7%) and a match-best nine blocks in the semifinal win against St. Olaf College. In the championship match against Juniata College Martz had 13 kills. With only 3 errors in the final four, she was named to the all-tournament team. The win gave Wash U its sixth consecutive national championship and seventh in eight years.

=== Junior year ===
On September 9, 1997, the Bears lost at home to Brigham Young University–Hawaii of the National Association of Intercollegiate Athletics 15–3, 15–5, 15–2, ending their 102-match home win streak that began after a November 17, 1990, defeat. She recorded a career-high 31 kills in a match against University of Wisconsin–La Crosse on October 17, 1997. Subsequently, for the week of October 20, Martz earned American Volleyball Coaches Association Division III national player of the week for a .598 hitting percentage with 80 kills and 14 blocks. The Bears earned their 9th consecutive University Athletic Association championship and 10th in 11 years with their 107th consecutive UAA match victory over Emory University with the support of 20 kills by Martz. She was named UAA Player of the Year again. As a 6 ft 1 in (1.85 m) junior middle blocker, Martz was named 1997 AVCA Division III first team All-American and Player of the Year. In the 1997 NCAA Division III women's volleyball tournament Martz had 24 kills in the regional semifinal against Trinity. In the regional final against Wellesley College, Martz had 17 kills and 10 blocks (six solo) to clinch a 9th consecutive Final Four appearance. As of December 2023, six solo blocks remains the most by a Bear in an NCAA Tournament match. In the national semifinals, for the first time in 6 NCAA tournament meetings, Juniata College (Pa.) beat the Bears 15-13, 15-13, 15-4 despite 7 kills and 4 blocks from Martz. Thus, the Bears' streak of six consecutive national championships came to an end. Her .495 hitting percentage was the best in NCAA Division III in 1997.

=== Senior year ===
Martz earned AVCA national player of the week honors for the week of November 2, 1998, for helping Wash U earn its 10th consecutive conference championship and becoming the first player to be named UAA MVP 3 consecutive seasons. In the 1998 NCAA Division III women's volleyball tournament, Martz posted 16 kills and hit .714 in a victory over Emory University. Martz tallied 8 blocks and the match winning kill in a victory over Trinity University for its 10th straight NCAA regional championship. The Bears were again defeated by Juanita College 13-15, 15-4, 15-7, 2-15, 12-15 at home on November 21, 1998. Martz was named as an AVCA first team All-American. She was a 1998 GTE/College Sports Information Directors of America (CoSIDA) second-team Academic All-American selection. Martz was named 1999 NCAA Division III Missouri Woman of the Year based on a combination of her academic achievement, athletic excellence and community service.

As of the 2023 NCAA Division III Women's Volleyball Record Book, Martz' career .444 (2,068 kills -455 errors/3,634 attacks) hitting percentage is second in NCAA DIII history to Wash U's Amy Albers. Martz was one of only four Division III four-time All-Americans (three first-team selections). Martz graduated as Washington University's all-time leader in kills, blocks and games played (549) and finished second in hitting percentage (.443) and attacks (3,634). As of December 2023 Martz remained the all-time leader in career kills (2,068), single-season kills (613), career blocks (588), career solo blocks (238), sets played (549), single-match hitting percentage leader (10–10). During her career at Wash U, Martz was a 3x hitting percentage leader, 3x kills leader, 4x blocks leader, 1x service ace leader. On multiple other occasions, she recorded 6 solo blocks at home, which is a Washington University Field House record.

After Martz' 1998 senior season, head coach Teri Clemens was no longer physically able to continue coaching.

Martz was a finalist for the NCAA 25th Anniversary (of NCAA Women's Championships) team. She was inducted into the Washington University Sports Hall of Fame on January 26, 2007.

== Honors ==
- NCAA All tournament team (1995, 96)
- AVCA All American (1995, 96, 97, 98)
- 1997 AVCA Division III National Player of the Year
- 1999 NCAA Division III Missouri Woman of the Year
- 1998 GTE/College Sports Information Directors of America (CoSIDA) second-team Academic All-American
