= Kasey Morlock =

American basketball player (born 1974/5)

Personal information
- Listed height: 6 ft 1 in (1.85 m)

Career information
- High school: Stewartville (Stewartville, Minnesota)
- College: North Dakota State (1993–1997)
- WNBA draft: 1997: undrafted
- Position: Center

Career highlights
- 3× NCAA DII champion (1994–1996); WBCA Player of the Year (1997); DII Honda Athlete of the Year (1997); 2× NCAA DII Tournament Most Outstanding Player (1995, 1996); 3x NCAA DII First-team All-American (1995–1997); Second-team Academic All-America (1997); NCC Player of the Year (1995); 4x All-NCC (1994–1997); NCC Freshman of the Year (1994); Minnesota Miss Basketball (1993)

Kasey A. Morlock is an American former college basketball and volleyball player for North Dakota State (NDSU) who then competed in the NCAA Division II North Central Conference (NCC). In high school, she won a 1991 Minnesota State High School League (MSHSL) championship in volleyball for Stewartville High School and was selected 1993 Minnesota Miss Basketball in a controversial vote. She is the all-time leading scorer at North Dakota State.

At NDSU, she earned three consecutive NCAA Division II women's basketball tournament championships and 2 Tournament Most Outstanding Player awards. She was named to the NCAA Division II 25th Anniversary women's basketball team. She earned 1997 Division II WBCA Player of the Year, DII Honda Athlete of the Year, Today's Top VIII Award, Academic All-America and a 3-time first team All-American recognition. She broke the NCC all-time scoring record. She led NDSU to the first undefeated season in Division II history and had two undefeated regular seasons. Morlock led NDSU to the longest winning streak in Division II history. After her freshman year she did not lose a home game until her senior season loss in the 1997 NCAA Division II women's basketball tournament. She set NCAA Division II championship tournament records for single-game and single-tournament run free throws made. Following her basketball career, she spent a fifth year at NDSU playing for a volleyball team that finished the year ranked 11th. She is the mother of Will Tschetter.

== High school ==
As a 6 ft 0 in (1.83 m) sophomore middle hitter for Stewartville, she was highly regarded by the time the school reached the November 1990 MSHSL state Class A volleyball tournament with an undefeated 26–0–1 record. The team was defeated in the MSHSL semifinals despite a 5-inch (12.7 cm) height advantage over Win-E-Mac High School. Stewartville returned to the MSHSL Class A tournament in November 1991 with Morlock as the featured attacker. They defeated Cook and Concordia Academy in straight sets in the quarterfinals and semifinals, respectively. They needed to rally from down 2 games to 1 and down 13–11 in the fourth game against MACCRAY High School to win the MSHSL state championship in five games. All-State honoree Morlock served an ace to clinch game four at 15–13. Morlock's "strong net play" was considered a large factor in the team's comeback and championship victory.

On November 11, 1992, Morlock signed with North Dakota State. She would cite the recent success (1991 championship, 1992 runner-up, & 1993 championship) of the team and tremendous fan support for women's basketball at the school in an explanation of her choice. Morlock chose NDSU over high major offers including Minnesota.

Despite winning the state championship in volleyball, it was still her second favorite sport behind basketball. Her sister Heidi was already playing basketball at Augustana. Heidi had been a 1990 Minnesota Miss Basketball finalist. As a senior, Kasey was Class A all-state in basketball by the coaches' association and first-team Class A All-State by the Associated Press. Tracy Henderson was selected as the 1993 Minnesota Player of the Year by the Gatorade Circle of Champions following the state championship tournament in March. Henderson was also awarded the State Player of the Year by the Associated Press, and USA Today, but a committee of eight former and present coaches and one sports editor awarded Morlock the Minnesota Miss Basketball title. Henderson was strongly endorsed by black civic leaders on appeal as a co-winner of Miss Basketball, but the committee expressed that it factored sportsmanship into its decision to select Morlock as the sole winner. The decision was controversial because two-time basketball Class AA state champion Henderson claims to have received no technical fouls all season and claimed to have been misunderstood due to cultural differences in her own rebuttal. Committee chairwoman Donna Mark also pointed out that Morlock held a 3.85 G.P.A., while Henderson had only achieved a 3.2.

== College ==
=== Freshman year ===
Morlock joined her sister Heidi on the 1994 all-NCC women's basketball team. She was also recognized as NCC Freshman of the year, like her sister had been three years before. By the time senior center Heidi and freshman center Kasey met for the third time that season in the March 11 Regional Semi-finals of the 1994 NCAA Division II women's basketball tournament with NDSU ranked number 5 and Augustana ranked number 8 in the national Division II rankings, Heidi had already set the NCC career rebounding record and was averaging 13.5 points and 10.3 rebounds compared to Kasey's 12.6 points and 7.4 rebounds. Kasey's 17 point and 13 rebound performance to advance to the regional final ended her sister's career with an 82–59 victory in front of her parents, Rod and Sharon Morlock, who were in the Augustana cheering section. Kasey had an 18 point, 11 rebound performance in the regional finals the following night against South Dakota State. During the elite eight run, Morlock was a big contributor with 16 points against Missouri Western on March 23, 11 points and 11 rebounds against North Alabama on March 24, and 8 points in the March 26 championship game victory against Cal State San Bernardino. She was named to the 1994 all-tournament team for her elite eight performance.

=== Sophomore ===
The 1994–95 Bisons were the pre-season number 1 ranked Division II team. Number 3-ranked North Dakota team, who had swept the home-and-home season series the year before, nearly stopped Number 1-ranked NDSU's winning streak at 33 on February 24, 1995, when they rallied from a 15-point halftime deficit to take a 71–66 lead with 3:33 remaining. However, NDSU outscored them 10–1 down the stretch for consecutive victory 34. Morlock had 31 points on the night including a basket to start the late comeback and the final points on two free throws with 21 seconds remaining. NDSU became the second team to ever achieve an 18–0 NCC season (after the prior year's North Dakota team). Morlock was the 1995 co-NCC Player of the Year with Sheri Kleinsasser.

Morlock led NDSU back to the elite eight of the 1995 NCAA Division II women's basketball tournament with a 28-point, 11-rebound performance against South Dakota State to clinch NDSU's 5th consecutive NCAA Division II North Central Region championship on March 11, 1995. In the March 22 quarterfinals 87–61 victory against Oakland (MI), Morlock had 19 points. She achieved a career-high 33 points and 12 rebounds on March 23 in the 74–67 semifinals win against Missouri Western. Morlock also made seven free throws in the final 1:42 and surpassed 1000 career points in the semifinals. Morlock contributed 15 points to the March 24 championship game 98–85 victory over Portland State, earning Tournament MVP. The 32–0 record marked the first undefeated season in NCAA Division II women's basketball history. The College Sports Information Directors of America (CoSIDA; now known as College Sports Communicators) named her as a first-team All-American. Morlock was a Kodak Division II All-American and a first-team Daktronics Division II All-American.

=== Junior year ===
On December 2, 1995, Morlock led the team with 16 points in a victory over Southwest State extending the win streak with a Division II record-setting 46th consecutive victory. The team had most recently lost on February 18, 1994, before beginning the current winning streak on February 25. The previous record of 45 had been set by Northern State. NDSU would extend the streak to 49 before Minnesota-Duluth ended their streak on December 16 at Duluth. Morlock's 16 was the team's only double-digit scoring total in the 66–51 loss. Their previous loss before the streak had been at home to North Dakota. Minnesota Duluth's court had been place that Minnesota Duluth had broken Northern State's streak. Morlock was on the All-NCC team.

NDSU would host the elite eight rounds of the 1996 NCAA Division II women's basketball tournament at the Bison Sports Arena (now known as Scheels Center) in Fargo, North Dakota. By the time the elite eight began, NDSU had a 14-game win streak and 40-game home win streak. On March 20, NDSU defeated Portland State 91–65 in the quarterfinals with 20 points from Morlock. In the semifinal 93–72 victory over Delta State, Morlock contributed 13. Morlock posted 21 points in the March 23, 104–78 championship game victory over Shippensburg. She was named Most Outstanding Player of the tournament as NDSU won its fourth consecutive Division II national championship, finishing the season with at 30–2 record. Morelock was named All-American by the Women's Basketball Coaches Association and Kodak. She was a first-team Daktronics Division II All-American.

=== Senior year ===
Pat Smykowski had scored 1838 career points from 1985 to 1989 for NDSU to establish the school record. On December 19, 1996, in a 74–56 victory against Moorhead State Morelock scored 18 points to bring her total to 1841. NDSU won its first 13 games by margins of 18 points or more before a 70–67 victory over St. Cloud State to keep their win streak intact at 31 on January 11, 1997. On February 28, 1997, she passed Sheri Kleinsasser for the NCC career scoring record as NDSU achieved its 44th consecutive victory with a 7th consecutive victory over North Dakota. This marked the 5th of those 7 in which they had to rally from a 2nd half deficit, this time 14 points with 12:51 remaining. Morlock made the All-NCC team for a fourth time. On March 9, in the 1997 NCAA Division II women's basketball tournament regional championship game, North Dakota snapped NDSU's win streak at 45, ended NDSU's attempt for a fifth consecutive national championship and seventh consecutive regional championship as well as snapped Morlock's 58-game double-digit scoring streak with a 73–66 win.

Morlock was an NCAA Division II 1997 Kodak All-American Basketball Team honoree. Morelock was a GTE Academic All-America second team selection. Morlock was chosen as the NCAA Woman of the Year for the state of North Dakota based on her academic, athletic and community leadership achievements. She was selected as the Honda DII Woman Athlete of the Year. Additionally, she was a Today's Top VIII Award recipient.

The part of the North Central Conference Record Book that was published after the conferences final season in 2008 and that is currently available generally recognizes all-time conference game conference records, but not all game conference records. According to that record book, Morlock ranks third all-time in career scoring with 1,328 points (behind 1,352 by Mandy Koupal, South Dakota, 2000-04 and 1,342 by Jenny Crouse, North Dakota, 1996-99) but first in career free throws made. Morlock's career point total for all games was 2,233. She also ranks 8th in conference history (behind her sister who is 3rd) in rebounds based on conference games. As a senior her 20.0 (360/18) points per conference game led the conference. The record book shows Morlock was 20th in the NCAA Division II scoring that same season with 585 points in all 29 games for a 20.2 average. Jennifer Crouse of NCC rival North Dakota totalled 2,284 career points in 1999.

=== Fifth year ===
Morlock needed a fifth year of school to complete her electrical engineering degree. No professional teams solicited her basketball skills. A professor convinced her that being a role player on the volleyball team might be a valuable life experience after spending several years in the limelight as the star of her teams. She began the season as the top reserve at two positions and within ten matches she made her first start. The team placed third in the regional competition at the 1997 NCAA Division II women's volleyball tournament and finished ranked 11th in the nation.

== Post graduate ==
In 2006, the NCAA decided to celebrate the 25th anniversary of its first Division II and Division III women's basketball championships by selecting a five-player, one-coach anniversary team in each division. Morlock was named to the NCAA Division II 25th Anniversary women's basketball team along with her coach Amy Ruley and University of North Dakota rival Crouse. The name Morlock is mentioned 19 times (18 for Kasey who is on the cover and 1 for Heidi) in the Official 2008 NCAA Women's Basketball Records Book. At that time, her career-point total was listed as 23rd among the top 25 all-time Division II scorers. In that book, she held 2 NCAA Division II championship tournament records: 17 single-game free throws made (shared) and 51 single tournament run free throws made. Both records were set during the 1995 NCAA Division II tournament when the top seeds only played a maximum of 5 games in the 48 team format. By the time of the Official 2010 NCAA Women's Basketball Records Book, many sections had been moved online ant her career point total was below the top 25.

== Personal life ==
Her sister Gretchen died of Hodgkin's disease in 1989. Garth Tschetter was a year behind Morlock at NDSU. She was in the very first class he attended at the school and they were both electrical engineering students. On July 28, 2001, Morlock and Garth Tschetter of Rochester, Minnesota were married. Morlock's father purchased the 160-acre (0.65 km^{2}; 0.25 mi^{2}) farm about 12 miles (19.3 km) south of Rochester, Minnesota as rental property while she was in high school. Her parents have a separate residence on the property and her brother owns an 80-acre (0.32 km^{2}; 0.13 mi^{2}) parcel nearby. Morlock moved in when she and Tschetter were hired as engineers by IBM in Rochester. The whole family contributes to the farm operation. For two years the Tschetter family left the farm while Garth was on assignment in Beijing.

Garth made 34 receptions and 3 touchdowns as a wide receiver for North Dakota State Bison football. Morlock claims to have active text communication with her former coaches Ruley and Kelly Lehman. Her eldest son Will (6 ft 8 in (2.03 m)) was part of the top-ranked recruiting class in the national class of 2021 at Michigan. Her middle son Henry (class of 2025, 6 ft 4 in (1.93 m)) has committed to play NCAA Division III basketball for Saint John's University of Minnesota and she has a third son Pete (class of 2027).
