= Jenna Smith =

American basketball player (born 1988)

Personal information
- Born: July 25, 1988 (age 38) Des Moines, Iowa, U.S.
- Listed height: 6 ft 3 in (1.91 m)

Career information
- High school: Kennedy (Bloomington, Minnesota)
- College: Illinois (2006–2010)
- WNBA draft: 2010: 2nd round, 14th overall pick
- Drafted by: Washington Mystics
- Position: Center
- Number: 13

Career highlights
- 3× First-team All-Big Ten (2008–2010); Big Ten All-Freshman Team (2007); AP Honorable Mention All-American (2008); Minnesota Miss Basketball (2006)
- Stats at Basketball Reference

Jenna Smith (born July 25, 1988) is an American former professional basketball center. She was drafted in the second round of the 2010 WNBA draft by the Washington Mystics, having previously played college basketball for the University of Illinois Fighting Illini where she earned First team All-Big Ten honors in 2008, 2009 and 2010.

== Playing career ==
By the end of her Illinois career in 2010, Smith was the all-time leader in points (2,160), rebounds (1,217), blocks (231) and double-doubles (53). As of 2021, she remains the career points, rebounds and double-double leader, and ranks third in career blocks. Other Illinois records for which she is still ranked number one include career field goals attempted (1,639), consecutive games scoring in double figures (54, from February 28, 2008 – January 14, 2010), single season rebounds (387 in 2009–2010), and single game free throw percentage (13–13 on November 25, 2007).

On January 27, 2025, Kendall Bostic broke Smith's career rebounding record at Illinois.

=== Illinois statistics ===
Legend
| GP | Games played | GS | Games started | MPG | Minutes per game | RPG | Rebounds per game |
| APG | Assists per game | SPG | Steals per game | BPG | Blocks per game | PPG | Points per game |
| TO | Turnovers per game | FG% | Field-goal percentage | 3P% | 3-point field-goal percentage | FT% | Free-throw percentage |
| **Bold** | Career best | ° | League leader |

| Year | Team | GP | GS | Points | PPG | RBS | RPG | FG% | 3P% | FT% | APG | SPG | BPG |
|---|---|---|---|---|---|---|---|---|---|---|---|---|---|
| 2006–07 | Illinois | 30 | 22 | 332 | 11.1 | 233 | 7.8 | **51.4%** | 33.3% | 77.2% | 1.8 | 0.6 | 1.3 |
| 2007–08 | Illinois | 28 | 28 | **640** | 18.3 | 329 | 9.4 | 50.3% | **42.3%** | 77.8% | **2.5** | **1.3** | 2.1 |
| 2008–09 | Illinois | **32** | **32** | 573 | **18.5** | 268 | 8.6 | 47.4% | 16.7% | 80.1% | 1.8 | 1.1 | 2.0 |
| 2009–10 | Illinois | 30 | 27 | 615 | 18.1 | **387** | **11.4** | 50.1% | 39.5% | **88.4%** | 2.4 | 0.9 | **2.3** |
| Career | | 116 | 99 | 2160 | 16.6 | 1217 | 9.4 | 49.6% | 35.7% | 81.1% | 2.2 | 1.0 | 2.0 |

=== College ===
==== 2009-10 ====
- July 30: The Women's Basketball Coaches Association (WBCA), on behalf of the Wade Coalition, announced the 2009–2010 preseason "Wade Watch" list for The State Farm Wade Trophy Division I Player of the Year. University of Illinois senior Jenna Smith is one of 25 named to the list, which is made up of top NCAA Division I student-athletes who best embody the spirit of Lily Margaret Wade. This is based on the following criteria: game and season statistics, leadership, character, effect on their team and overall playing ability.

==== 2008-09 ====
In her junior year, she played and started in all 31 games and was third in the Big Ten in scoring (18.5 ppg) and blocked shots (2.0) and sixth in rebounding (8.6).

- Led the conference and ranked fourth in the nation in minutes per game (38.7)
- Has scored in double-figures in 39 consecutive games, the fifth-longest streak in the nation at the end of 2008–09, and in 67 of the last 68 games overall
- Set the Illinois career blocks record on March 1 against Minnesota
- Had 10 double-doubles on the season, including eight in conference play to rank second in the Big Ten *Led the Big Ten in offensive rebounds (3.39) and minutes played (39. 44) in conference play
- Named to the 50-player Naismith Award Watch List
- Selected to the Big Ten All-Tournament Team, averaging 23.5 points, 7.0 rebounds and 2.0 blocks in Illinois' two games
- Surpassed the 1,000 point milestone in season opener at IPFW, scoring 29 points
- Passed the 1,500 point milestone in the Big Ten Tournament, becoming just the third Illini to reach that total in less than three seasons
- Led the Illini to an upset win over Indiana on Jan. 25 with 24 points (9-of-14 shooting) 15 rebounds and three blocks
- Had a double-double of 18 points and a season-best 18 rebounds against Iowa on Jan. 15
- Averaged 20.7 points and 6.3 rebounds in the Illini's three games in the Cancun Caribbean Challenge Nov. 26–28, scoring 19 points against Montana, 22 against South Dakota State and 21 against Maryland

==== 2007-08 ====
- Had 59 blocked shots on the year to break the 25-year-old Illinois single-season blocks record of 57
- Ended the year ranked second on the UI single-season rebounding list (329)
- Earned a spot on the All-Big Ten Tournament Team after averaging 17.3 points and 9.3 rebounds while carrying the Illini to the championship game
- Led the Big Ten with 16 double-doubles on the season
- Finished the season ranked second in the Big Ten in scoring (18.3) and rebounding (9.4), she was one of only eight players in the nation to average at least 18.0 points and 9.0 rebounds per game
- She held a streak of 28 straight games in double digits that was snapped on Feb. 24 vs. Michigan
- Set a new school record by hitting 13-of-13 from the free throw line against Providence on Nov. 25
- Scored a career-high 32 points on Nov. 18 vs. Southern Illinois University, the most by an Illini since 2001

==== 2006-07 ====
- Played in 30 games, starting 22 at center
- Honorable Mention All-Big Ten and Big Ten All-Freshman Team selection
- Led all Big Ten freshmen in rebounding for both all games (7.8) and conference games (8.5)
- Led the Big Ten Conference in offensive rebounding in conference games (3.60)
- Grabbed a career-high 16 rebounds at Indiana on Feb. 18, which was the second-highest single-game rebounding total in the Big Ten in 2006–07
- Ranked third among Big Ten freshmen in scoring (11.1)
- Led Big Ten freshmen in FT percentage (.767) and ranked second among league rookies in FG percentage (.514) and blocks (1.30) in all games

==== High school ====
- Was the 69th-ranked senior in the class of 2006 by Blue Star Report and was listed as the No. 24 center in the class by All-Star Girls Report
- Named Minnesota's Ms. Basketball and Associated Press Player of the Year after leading Kennedy to a 30–2 record and runner-up finish in the Class 4A State Tournament as a senior
- Also named Minneapolis Star-Tribune Metro Player of the Year
- Averaged 20.5 points, 10.2 rebounds, 3.6 blocks and 3.3 steals per game and also shot 55 percent from the field, 47 percent from the three-point line and 74 percent from the free throw line for the Eagles
- As a junior in 2004–05, led Kennedy to the Class 4A State Championship with a 28–2 record
- Named first team All-State, All-Metro and All-Lake Conference as a junior and senior
- Holds the Minnesota career record for blocked shots

== Professional ==
=== WNBA ===
Smith was drafted in the second round, 14th overall, by the Washington Mystics in the 2010 WNBA draft. She was waived by the Mystics in late April 2010, due to a knee injury that prevented her from competing during training camp. She later signed with the Indiana Fever on a training camp contract.

=== International ===
Smith has played professional basketball in 13 countries, including France, Slovakia, Israel, Romania, Czech Republic, Italy, Spain, Greece, Poland, Cyprus and Mexico. She retired from playing in 2022.

== Coaching career ==
In 2016, Smith was named assistant coach of the Indiana State Sycamores women's basketball team.

As of 2026, Smith is the head basketball coach at the GOAT Lab in Kowloon, Hong Kong.

In 2026, Smith joined the Cottey College Comets in Nevada, Missouri, as the assistant basketball coach.

== Awards and records ==
- Named Minnesota Ms. Basketball in her senior year at Kennedy High School (2006)
- Associated Press Honorable Mention All-American (2007–08)
- Broke the Illinois freshman rebounding record (233) and tied the frosh blocked shots record along with fellow freshman Lacey Simpson (39)
- Holds Illinois single-season blocks record with 63 (2008–09)
- MVP of the 2007 FIU Thanksgiving Classic after leading Illinois to the tournament title
- Named Illinois Most Valuable Player (2008–09)
- Named first team All-Big Ten by both the coaches and media for the second consecutive year (2008–09)
- Named first team All-Big Ten by both the coaches and media (2007–08)
- Named the team's MVP and Most Inspiriational Player and also won the Ralf Woods Free Throw Excellence Award at the postseason awards banquet
- Three-time Big Ten Player of the Week in 2007–08, the first Illini to earn the honor three times in one season since 1985–86
- Inducted into the Illinois Athletics Hall of Fame in 2020
- Her Illinois jersey was honored by being raised to the rafters of State Farm Center in February 2023
