= 1987 NCAA Division I women's volleyball tournament =

Volleyball competition

1987 NCAA women's Division I volleyball tournament
- 1987 NCAA Final Four logo
- Champions: Hawaiʻi (3rd NCAA (4th national) title)
- Runner-up: Stanford (3rd title match)
- Semifinalists: Illinois (1st Final Four); Texas (2nd Final Four)
- Winning coach: Dave Shoji (3rd title)
- Final Four All-Tournament Team: Suzanne Eagye (Hawaiʻi); Diana Jessie (Hawaiʻi); Teee Williams (Hawaiʻi); Nancy Reno (Stanford); Wendi Rush (Stanford); Teresa Smith (Stanford)

The 1987 NCAA Division I women's volleyball tournament began with 32 teams and ended on December 19, 1987, when Hawaiʻi defeated Stanford 3 games to 1 in the NCAA championship match.

Hawaiʻi won the school's third NCAA national title and fourth overall in women's volleyball, while Stanford finished as runners-up for the third time in four years. Hawaiʻi was led by AVCA National Player of the Year Teee Williams' 17 kills.

== Brackets ==
=== Northwest regional ===
First round
Hawaiʻi	3
Arizona	0
Cal Poly	3
UCSB	1
San Jose State	3
Idaho State	0
Long Beach State	0
Pacific	3

Regional semifinal
Hawaiʻi	3
Cal Poly	0
San Jose State	0
Pacific	3

Regional Final
Hawaiʻi	3
Pacific	1

=== Mideast regional ===
First round
Illinois	3
Pittsburgh	1
Oklahoma	0
Western Michigan	3
Northern Iowa	0
Nebraska	3
Purdue	3
Penn State	0

Regional semifinal
Illinois	3
Western Michigan	2
Nebraska	3
Purdue	0

Regional Final
Illinois	3
Nebraska	0

=== South regional ===
First round
Texas	3
Florida State	0
Florida	3
LSU	2
UT Arlington	3
Arizona State	0
North Carolina State	1
Kentucky	3

Regional semifinal
Texas	3
Florida	0
UT Arlington	1
Kentucky	3

Regional Final
Texas	3
Kentucky	1

=== West regional ===
First round
BYU	3
Pepperdine	0
California	1
UCLA	3
Colorado State	3
Southern California	2
Oregon	0
Stanford	3

Regional semifinal
BYU	3
UCLA	1
Colorado State	0
Stanford	3

Regional Final
BYU	1
Stanford	3

== Final Four - Market Square Arena, Indianapolis, Indiana ==
National semifinals December 17
Hawaiʻi	3
Illinois	0
Texas	2
Stanford	3

National championship December 19
Hawaiʻi	3
Stanford	1
