= Curtis Borchardt =

American basketball player (born 1980)

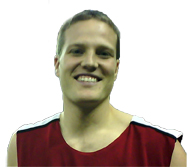

Personal information
- Born: September 13, 1980 (age 46) Buffalo, New York, U.S.
- Listed height: 7 ft 0 in (2.13 m)
- Listed weight: 240 lb (109 kg)

Career information
- High school: Eastlake (Sammamish, Washington)
- College: Stanford (1999–2002)
- NBA draft: 2002: 1st round, 18th overall pick
- Drafted by: Orlando Magic
- Playing career: 2003–2012
- Position: Center

Career history
- 2003–2005: Utah Jazz
- 2005–2009: Granada
- 2009–2010: ASVEL Lyon-Villeurbanne
- 2012: Blancos de Rueda Valladolid

Career highlights
- Washington Mr. Basketball (1999)
- Stats at NBA.com
- Stats at Basketball Reference

Curtis Alan Borchardt (born September 13, 1980) is an American former professional basketball player. He is a 7 ft 0 in (2.13 m) tall center.

== Amateur career ==
Borchardt played high school basketball in Sammamish, Washington (then Redmond), for Eastlake High School. He then attended Stanford University, where he was an honorable mention All-American as a junior in 2002.

== Pro career ==
Borchardt was selected 18th overall in the first round by the Orlando Magic in the 2002 NBA draft but was traded to the Utah Jazz. Injury-prone in college, this continued as he sat out his rookie season. He made his Jazz debut in the 2003–04 campaign. He was dealt to the Boston Celtics as part of the largest trade in NBA history – a 13-player, 5-team deal on August 2, 2005. He was not included on Boston's roster in 2005–06 but played with them in the preseason, scoring seven points in seven games.

Borchardt's final NBA game was on April 12, 2005, in a 85–94 loss to the Los Angeles Clippers where he recorded 2 points and 2 rebounds. Borchardt played a total of 83 NBA career games from 2003 - 2005 and averaged 3.1 points and 3.3 rebounds.

He moved to the Spanish League club Granada in December 2005. In 2009, he joined the French League club ASVEL.

In 2012, Borchardt signed with Blancos de Rueda Valladolid of Liga ACB.

Awards and achievements:

- 2008–09 ACB league leader in rebounding.
- 2006–07 ACB league leader in rebounding and valuation (Player Efficiency).
- 13-time Spanish ACB Player of the Week and 5-time Player of the Month designations 2005–12.
- All Rocky Mountain Review NBA Summer League 1st Team 2004.
- Selected 18th overall in the 1st round of the 2002 NBA draft by the Orlando Magic then traded to the Utah Jazz.
- 2001–02 1st Team All-Pac-10 and AP Honorable Mention All American
- 2001–02 Stanford's Hank Luisetti Team Most Valuable Player and Best Defensive Player
- Set Stanford Men's Basketball Single Season Record for Blocks (85) during the 2001–02 season and currently ranks 2nd in the school's Career Blocks list at (145).
- 2-time Pac-10 Men's Basketball conference champion at Stanford during the 1999–2000 and 2000–01 seasons.

== Personal life ==
His wife, Susan King Borchardt, also played college basketball at Stanford University and later played professionally for the Minnesota Lynx in the WNBA.
