= Holli Hyche =

American sprinter (born 1971)

Personal information
- Nationality: United States
- Born: September 6, 1971
- Education: Perry Meridian High School, Indiana State University
- Occupation: Retired sprinter / Athlete
- Years active: Early 1990s (e.g., 1991–1994)
- Height: 5 ft 5 in (165 cm)
- Weight: 120 lb (54 kg)
- Other interests: Bowling (noted as a teenager)

Sport
- Sport: Track and field
- Events: 100 metres, 200 metres
- College team: Indiana State Sycamores
- Retired: Yes

Achievements and titles
- National finals: NCAA Outdoor Championships; • 100 metres – 1993, 1994; • 200 metres – 1993; NCAA Indoor Championships; • 55 metres – 1993, 1994; • 200 metres – 1993, 1994
- Personal bests: 100 m: 11.03 s (1994); 200 m: 22.34 s (1993)

Holli Hyche (born 6 September 1971) is an American former sprinter who competed at the collegiate level for Indiana State University in the early 1990s. She won seven NCAA individual national championships and earned 15 NCAA All-American honors in sprint events.

== Early life ==
Hyche was born on September 6, 1971, to parents JoAnn and Buddie Hyche.

Hyche attended Perry Meridian High School in Indianapolis, Indiana, Indiana, where she won Indiana High School Athletic Association (IHSAA) state titles in both the 100 metres and 200 metres as a sophomore. She wore eyeglasses while competing due to poor vision and was diagnosed with dyslexia.

She attended college at Indiana State University, where she majored in sports studies. To make sure she met the NCAA's Proposition 48 standard, she did not participate in the track season her freshman year.

== Career ==
While running for the Indiana State Sycamores track and field team, Hyche won seven NCAA Division I individual national championships in sprinting events and was a 15-time All-American. She won titles in the 55 meters at the NCAA Division I Indoor Track and Field Championships in 1993 and 1994. She also won indoor 200 meters titles in 1993 and 1994. Outdoors, Hyche won 100 m and 200 m titles in 1993 and the 1994 100-meter title. She also won multiple Missouri Valley Conference titles.

In 1994, Hyche was selected to win the Honda Sports Award. She was inducted into the Missouri Valley Conference Hall of Fame in 1999, the Indiana State Sycamores Hall of Fame in 2004, and the USTFCCCA Hall of Fame in 2023.

== See also ==
- Indiana State Sycamores
- 60 meters at the NCAA Division I Indoor Track and Field Championships
- Indiana Sports Hall of Fame
