= Janice Parks =

Puerto Rican softball player

Personal information
- Nationality: Puerto Rican
- Born: 8 October 1967 (age 58)

Sport
- Sport: Softball

Janice Parks (born 8 October 1967) is a Puerto Rican softball player. She competed in the women's tournament at the 1996 Summer Olympics.
