= Suzanne Eagye Cox =

American volleyball player

Personal information
- Full name: Suzanne Eagye Cox
- Nationality: American
- Born: Suzanne Elizabeth Eagye; April 26, 1966 (age 60); San Diego, California, U.S.
- Height: 6 ft 3 in (1.91 m)

Volleyball information
- Position: Middle blocker

Suzanne Eagye Cox (née Eagye) is a retired volleyball player who played collegiately for the Hawaii Rainbow Wahine volleyball team. She played for the team that won the 1987 NCAA Division I women's volleyball tournament.

== Early years ==
One of four children born to Gordon Maxwell Eagye Jr. (1931-2015) and Sandra (Strickland) Eagye, Suzanne played basketball for Point Loma High School in San Diego. In one game, she scored 32 points in the first three quarters, then was taken out by her coach when the team had a large lead. She graduated in 1984.

== College ==
Eagye was not heavily recruited, but Hawai'i head coach Dave Shoji–who had three national championships (1979, 1982, 1983) when he recruited her–would later talk about "Emily Hartong and Suzanne Eagye as examples of players who were not heavily recruited, but while playing at UH they worked hard and elevated their game".

As a freshman, she helped her team to earn an invitation to the 1984 NCAA Division I women's volleyball tournament, but they fell in the first round to Oregon. As a sophomore, the team again earned an invitation to the 1985 NCAA Division I women's volleyball tournament. This year they made it to the regional semifinal, but lost to rival Pacific. As a junior, she played well enough to be named to the AVCA Division I All-American first team. The team once again earned a trip to the 1986 NCAA Division I women's volleyball tournament. They made it all the way to the Regional finals, before meeting Pacific and bowing out of the tournament. As a senior, she was again named to the AVCA All-American first team. The team returned to the 1987 NCAA Division I women's volleyball tournament. They won their first two matches without dropping a set, then faced Pacific for the third time in three year in the regional final. Eagye would later talk about her "favorite Klum Gym memory ... defeating nemesis Pacific in the 1987 regional". After advancing to the Final Four, Hawai'i faced Illinois in the national semifinal. Illinois had an almost insurmountable 14–8 lead in the first set, but Hawai'i, facing 7 set points, came back to win 19–17. They went on to win the match in straight sets. In the championship match they faced Stanford, who started out with lead in each of the first three games. Despite that, Hawai'i won two of those three sets, then after giving up a single point in the final set, scored 14 consecutive points to win the set, the match and the National Championship. Eagye scored "the winning points in all three games for Hawai'i by blocking returns across the middle of the net". Eagye and her teammates had taken a victory lap around the court after defeating Pacific—they would repeat the circuit after the NCAA title match. She was named to the All Tournament Team.

She won the Broderick Award, (now the Honda Sports Award) as the best female collegiate volleyball player in 1987–88. Coincidentally, she had some thoughts about this award shortly before she was chosen as the winner. She recalled, "I was walking down the hall at school a few days before I found out I won it, and I saw a poster with the 1987 winners. I thought, 'it would be so neat to win an award like that.'"

== Professional career ==
Eagye played professionally in Europe, with her last serious volleyball played for a team in Switzerland in 1989.

== Awards and honors ==
- 1986 AVCA All-American
- 1987 AVCA All-American
- 1987 Final Four All Tournament Team
- 1988 Honda Sports Award
- 2004 Inducted into Hawai'i Hall of Fame as a member of the 1987 Rainbow Wahine Volleyball Team

== Family ==
Eagye married Timothy C. Cox in 1989. They have four children.
