= Sally Schlobohm Tan =

American volleyball player and coach

Personal information
- Nationality: United States
- Height: 5 ft 7 in (1.70 m)
- Education: Texas

Volleyball information
- Position: Setter

Sally Schlobohm Tan is a volleyball player and coach. She played collegiately for Kellogg Community College and Texas, and coached at Leander High School.

== Early years ==
Schlobohm grew up in South Bend, Indiana.

== College ==
Schlobohm initially played volleyball at Kellogg Community College under coach Mick Haley. He coached both the men's and women's team at Kellogg, and his women's team won the national junior college title in both 1978 and 1979. Schlobohm earned National Junior College Player of the Year honors for 1978–79. Texas persuaded him to become the head coach of their program in 1980, and Schlobohm followed him that same year to Texas. In just the second year with Haley as coach, the team would finish with a 60–6–1 record in 1981 and win the Southwest Conference (SWC) championship. The team included Nell Fortner, who would go on to a successful career as a basketball coach and commentator. They were invited to the AIAW post-season Tournament. In that tournament they had a "a pair of epic matches in the championship series" against Portland State. They ended up prevailing and Texas won the AIAW volleyball championship.

Schlobohm earned All-American honors for her season, and she was named the recipient of the Broderick Award (now the Honda Sports Award) and the nation's best collegiate volleyball player.

In 2003, Schlobohm, then Sally Schlobohm Tan, was inducted into the UT Austin Athletics Hall of Honor.

== Professional career ==
Schlobohm had a very brief professional career in beach volleyball in 1992.

== Coaching ==
Tan served as the Volleyball coach at Leander High School in Leander, Texas for 20 years.

== Awards and honors ==
- 1980 All-American
- 1981 All-American
- 1981 Honda Sports Award (volleyball)
- 2003 Athletics Hall of Honor (UT Austin)
