= Teri Clemens =

American volleyball coach

Personal information
- Nationality: American

Coaching information
Previous teams coached
Teams
Washington University in St. Louis

Teri Clemens is an American retired volleyball coach. Clemens served as the head coach at Washington University in St. Louis for 14 years, where she led the Bears to seven NCAA Division III national championships, including six consecutive from 1991-96.

== Early life ==
Before taking over for Washington University, she served as the head coach at Incarnate Word Academy in Saint Louis, Missouri, where she accumulated a 155-15 record with three Missouri State championships in 1982, 1983 and 1984.

== Washington University ==
Washington University dominated Division III under Clemens, as they won the NCAA Division III national championship seven times, including an unprecedented six in a row from 1991-96. Clemens coached the Bears for fourteen seasons, from 1985-1998. She now ranks second in the NCAA Division III record book for career-winning percentage of .873.

Aside from coaching, Clemens served on the AVCA All-America Committee as the chair of the South Region and was an AVCA poll voter. She also served as the Division III representative on the AVCA Board of Directors from 1990-93. During her time on the board, the AVCA instituted the Division III national poll to provide publicity for schools playing at the Division III level. She was inducted into the AVCA Hall of Fame in 2004.

Clemens graduated from Parkway West Senior High School in 1974. Following her tenure at Washington University, Clemens gave the commencement address at PWSH graduation.

== Books ==
- Wrote and published "Get With It Girls! Life is Competition" (Copyright 2001)
- Wrote chapter 15: Setting for the "Volleyball Coaching Bible" (Copyright 2002)

== Honors and awards ==
- 2005 – NCAA Division III 25th Anniversary Team
- 2004 – AVCA Hall of Fame induction
- 1999 – Eliot Society Search Award
- 1997 – United States Olympic Committee National Coach of the Year
- 1996 – AVCA Division III National Coach of the Year
- 1995 – Truman State Hall of Fame induction
- 1994 – AVCA Division III National Coach of the Year
- 1991 – AVCA Division III National Coach of the Year
