= Tina Barrett (golfer) =

American professional golfer (born 1966)

Personal information
- Full name: Christina Barrett
- Nationality: United States
- Born: June 5, 1966 (age 60) Baltimore, Maryland, U.S.
- Height: 5 ft 4.5 in (1.64 m)

Career
- Sport: Golf
- College: Longwood College
- Status: Professional
- Former tour: LPGA Tour (1989-2007)
- Professional wins: 1

Number of wins by tour
- LPGA Tour: 1

Best results in LPGA major championships
- Chevron Championship: T2: 1993
- Women's PGA C'ship: T20: 2003
- U.S. Women's Open: T11: 1991
- du Maurier Classic: T6: 1992
- Women's British Open: T16: 2002

Achievements and awards
- Honda Broderick Award: 1988

Christina Barrett (born June 5, 1966) is an American professional golfer who played on the LPGA Tour.

== Career ==
Barrett attended Longwood College. While at university, she won the Honda-Broderick Award (now the Honda Sports Award) for golf, only the second Division II player to win this award.

Barrett won once on the LPGA Tour in 1989.

== Awards and honors ==
In 1988, she won the she won the Honda-Broderick Award in the golf category. The award is bestowed to the top female college golfer in the United States.

== Professional wins (1) ==
=== LPGA Tour wins (1) ===
No.	Date	Tournament	Winning score	Margin of victory	Runner-up
1	Aug 27, 1989	Mitsubishi Motors Ocean State Open	−6 (67-73-70=210)	2 strokes	(United States) Nancy Scranton

LPGA Tour playoff record (0–2)

No.	Year	Tournament	Opponent	Result
1	1998	Japan Classic	(Japan) Hiromi Kobayashi	Lost to birdie on third extra hole
2	1999	Michelob Light Classic	(Sweden) Annika Sörenstam	Lost to birdie on third extra hole
