= Gina Weber =

New Zealand softball player

Gina Weber MNZM
Personal information
- Born: 14 February 1963 (age 63) Huntly, New Zealand
- Height: 1.90 m (6 ft 3 in)
- Weight: 98 kg (216 lb)

Sport
- Country: New Zealand
- Sport: Softball

Gina Louise Weber MNZM (born 14 February 1963) is a New Zealand softball player. A pitcher, she competed at the 2000 Summer Olympics in Sydney, where the New Zealand team placed sixth in the women's softball tournament.

In the 2001 New Year Honours, Weber was appointed a Member of the New Zealand Order of Merit, for services to softball.
