= Minnesota Miss Basketball =

High school basketball award in Minnesota, US

Each year the Minnesota Miss Basketball award is given to the person chosen as the best high school girls basketball player in the U.S. state of Minnesota. The honor has been awarded annually since 1978 by the Minnesota Girls Basketball Coaches Association.

The award has generally been given to one recipient each year. However, in 1984, no award was given, and in the years 1985–1989, awards were given to two winners, from Class A and Class AA.

== Award winners ==
| Year | Player | High School | College | WNBA draft |
|---|---|---|---|---|
| 1978 | Laura Gardner | Bloomington Jefferson | Minnesota | |
| 1979 | Jean Tierney | St. Paul Central | Creighton University | |
| 1980 | Janet Karvonen | New York Mills | Old Dominion, transferred to Louisiana Tech | |
| 1981 | Kelly Skalicky | Albany | | |
| 1982 | Annie Adamczak | Moose Lake | | |
| 1983 | Angela Kuehn | MN State Academy for the Deaf | | |
| 1984 | None | | | |
| 1985 Class A | Kristi Kremer | Wheaton | | |
| 1985 Class AA | Denise Holm | Duluth East | | |
| 1986 Class A | Laurie Decker | Rochester Lourdes | Iowa State University | |
| 1986 Class AA | Amy Davidson | St. Louis Park | | |
| 1987 Class A | Laurie Decker | Rochester Lourdes | Iowa State University | |
| 1987 Class AA | Mya Whitmore | Hill-Murray | | |
| 1988 Class A | Mary Jo Miller | Tracy-Milroy | | |
| 1988 Class AA | Carolyn Frisk | Stillwater | | |
| 1989 Class A | Yoli Murphy | CHOF | | |
| 1989 Class AA | Jessica Fiebelkorn | Osseo | Notre Dame (Volleyball) | |
| 1990 | Carol Ann Shudlick | Apple Valley | Minnesota | |
| 1991 | Shannon Loeblein | St. Paul Harding | Minnesota | |
| 1992 | Stacy Fields | Mounds View | Notre Dame | |
| 1993 | Kasey Morlock | Stewartville | North Dakota State | |
| 1994 | Kiersten Miller | Bloomington Jefferson | Drake University | |
| 1995 | Linda Shudlick | Apple Valley | UCLA (Volleyball), transferred to Minnesota (Volleyball) | |
| 1996 | Sue Fiero | Goodhue | Minnesota-Duluth | |
| 1997 (tie) | Coco Miller | Rochester Mayo | Georgia | 2001 WNBA draft: 1st Rnd, 9th overall by the Washington Mystics |
| 1997 (tie) | Kelly Miller | Rochester Mayo | Georgia | 2001 WNBA draft: 1st Rnd, 2nd overall by the Charlotte Sting |
| 1998 | Tamara Moore | Minneapolis North | Wisconsin | 2002 WNBA draft: 1st Rnd, 15th overall by the Miami Sol |
| 1999 | Mauri Horton | Minneapolis North | Rutgers | |
| 2000 | Susan King | Holy Angels | Stanford | |
| 2001 | April Calhoun | Robbinsdale Armstrong | Iowa, transferred to Minnesota | |
| 2002 | Shannon Bolden | Marshall | Minnesota | |
| 2003 | Liz Podominick | Lakeville | Minnesota | |
| 2004 | Leslie Knight | Hopkins | Minnesota | |
| 2005 | Katie Ohm | Elgin-Millville | Minnesota | |
| 2006 | Jenna Smith | Bloomington Kennedy | Illinois | 2010 WNBA draft: 2nd Rnd, 14th overall by the Washington Mystics |
| 2007 | Angel Robinson | St. Paul Central | Marquette | 2011 WNBA draft: 2nd Rnd, 22nd overall by the New York Liberty |
| 2008 | Courtney Boylan | Chaska | Michigan | |
| 2009 | Tayler Hill | Minneapolis South | Ohio State | 2013 WNBA draft: 1st Rnd, 4th overall by the Washington Mystics |
| 2010 | Cassie Rochel | Lakeville North | Wisconsin | |
| 2011 | Rachel Banham | Lakeville North | Minnesota | 2016 WNBA draft: 1st Rnd, 4th overall by the Connecticut Sun |
| 2012 | Marissa Janning | Watertown-Mayer High School | Creighton | |
| 2013 | Rebekah Dahlman | Braham High School | Vanderbilt | |
| 2014 | Carlie Wagner | NRHEG High School | Minnesota | 2018 WNBA draft: 3rd Rnd, 35th overall by the Minnesota Lynx |
| 2015 | Madison Guebert | Eastview High School | South Dakota State | |
| 2016 | Nia Hollie | Hopkins High School | Michigan State | |
| 2017 | Gabi Haack | Elk River High School | Bradley | |
| 2018 | Megan Walstad | Eastview High School | UW-Milwaukee | |
| 2019 | Kacie Borowicz | Roseau | North Dakota | |
| 2020 | Paige Bueckers | Hopkins | Connecticut | 2025 WNBA draft: 1st Rnd, 1st overall by the Dallas Wings |
| 2021 | Adalia McKenzie | Park Center | Illinois | |
| 2022 | Amaya Battle | Hopkins | Minnesota | |
| 2023 | Tessa Johnson | St. Michael-Albertville | South Carolina | |
| 2024 | Olivia Olson | Benilde-St. Margaret's | Michigan | |
| 2025 | Jordan Ode | Maple Grove | Michigan State | |
| 2026 | Maddyn Greenway | Providence Academy | Kentucky | |

== See also ==
- Minnesota Mr. Basketball
