= Spain at the 1992 Summer Olympics =

- IOC code: ESP
- NOC: Spanish Olympic Committee

in Barcelona
- Competitors: 422 (297 men and 125 women) in 29 sports
- Flag bearer: Felipe de Borbón
- Medals Ranked 6th: Gold 13 Silver 7 Bronze 2 Total 22

Summer Olympics appearances (overview)
- 1900; 1904–1912; 1920; 1924; 1928; 1932; 1936; 1948; 1952; 1956; 1960; 1964; 1968; 1972; 1976; 1980; 1984; 1988; 1992; 1996; 2000; 2004; 2008; 2012; 2016; 2020; 2024

Spain was the host nation for the 1992 Summer Olympics in Barcelona. The Games were quite exceptional for Spain because their athletes were competing not only in their home country, but also in the home city of IOC President Juan Antonio Samaranch. 422 competitors, 297 men and 125 women, took part in 195 events in 29 sports.

== Medalists ==
Medal	Name	Sport	Event	Date
Gold	José Manuel Moreno	Cycling	Men's track time trial	July 27
Gold	Martin López-Zubero	Swimming	Men's 200 m backstroke	July 28
Gold	Daniel Plaza	Athletics	Men's 20 km walk	July 31
Gold	Miriam Blasco	Judo	Women's Lightweight (56 kg)	July 31
Gold	Almudena Muñoz	Judo	Women's Half Lightweight (52 kg)	August 1
Gold	Luís Doreste; Domingo Manrique	Sailing	Flying Dutchman	August 2
Gold	José María van der Ploeg	Sailing	Finn	August 2
Gold	Jordi Calafat; Kiko Sánchez	Sailing	Men's 470	August 3
Gold	Theresa Zabell; Patricia Guerra	Sailing	Women's 470	August 3
Gold	Antonio Vázquez; Alfonso Menéndez; Juan Holgado	Archery	Men's Team	August 4
Gold	Spain women's national field hockey team: Anna Maiques; Celia Correa; Elisabeth Maragall; María Ángeles Rodríguez; María Carmen Barea; Marívi González; Maider Tellería; María Isabel Martínez; Mercedes Coghen; Nagore Gabellanes; Natalia Dorado; Nuria Olivé; Silvia Manrique; Sonia Barrio; Teresa Motos; Virginia Ramírez	Field hockey	Women's tournament	August 7
Gold	Fermín Cacho	Athletics	Men's 1500 m	August 8
Gold	Spain national under-23 football team: Santiago Cañizares; Albert Ferrer; Mikel Lasa; Roberto Solozábal; Juanma López; David Villabona; José Amavisca; Luis Enrique; Pep Guardiola; Abelardo; Javier Manjarín; Francisco Veza; Toni; Gabriel Vidal; Paco Soler; Miguel; Rafael Berges; Antonio Pinilla; Kiko; Alfonso	Football	Football	August 8
Silver	Natalia Vía Dufresne	Sailing	Europe	August 3
Silver	Antonio Peñalver	Athletics	Men's decathlon	August 6
Silver	Carolina Pascual	Gymnastics	Women's rhythmic individual all-around	August 8
Silver	Jordi Arrese	Tennis	Men's singles	August 8
Silver	Arantxa Sánchez Vicario; Conchita Martínez	Tennis	Women's doubles	August 8
Silver	Faustino Reyes	Boxing	Featherweight (57 kg)	August 9
Silver	Spain men's national water polo team: Daniel Ballart; Jesús Rollán; Jordi Sans; Josep Picó; Manuel Estiarte; Manuel Silvestre; Marco Antonio González; Miguel Ángel Oca; Pedro Francisco García; Ricardo Sánchez; Rubén Michavila; Salvador Gómez; Sergi Pedrerol	Water polo	Water polo	August 9
Bronze	Javier García Chico	Athletics	Men's pole vault	August 7
Bronze	Arantxa Sánchez Vicario	Tennis	Women's singles	August 7

Medals by sport
Sport	1st place, gold medalist(s)	2nd place, silver medalist(s)	3rd place, bronze medalist(s)	Total
Sailing	4	1	0	5
Athletics	2	1	1	4
Judo	2	0	0	2
Archery	1	0	0	1
Cycling	1	0	0	1
Field hockey	1	0	0	1
Football	1	0	0	1
Swimming	1	0	0	1
Tennis	0	2	1	3
Boxing	0	1	0	1
Gymnastics	0	1	0	1
Water polo	0	1	0	1
Total	13	7	2	22

== Competitors ==
The following is the list of number of competitors in the Games.

Sport	Men	Women	Total
Archery	3	1	4
Athletics	44	15	59
Badminton	1	1	2
Baseball	20	–	20
Basketball	12	11	23
Boxing	7	–	7
Canoeing	15	7	22
Cycling	11	3	14
Diving	2	1	3
Equestrian	8	0	8
Fencing	15	2	17
Field hockey	16	15	31
Football	17	–	17
Gymnastics	2	8	10
Handball	16	14	30
Judo	5	7	12
Modern pentathlon	3	–	3
Rowing	22	0	22
Sailing	13	4	17
Shooting	10	5	15
Swimming	9	12	21
Synchronized swimming	–	3	3
Table tennis	2	2	4
Tennis	4	2	6
Volleyball	12	12	24
Water polo	12	–	12
Weightlifting	6	–	6
Wrestling	10	–	10
Total	297	125	422

== Archery ==
The four Spaniards had little success in the individual round, with only one qualifying for the elimination matches. He lost in the first round. The men's team, however, surprised the world by pulling off four upsets to claim the gold medal—Spain's first archery medal—in front of a home crowd.

Men

Athlete	Event	Ranking round		Round of 32	Round of 16	Quarterfinals	Semifinals	Final / BM	
Athlete	Event	Score	Seed	Opposition Score	Opposition Score	Opposition Score	Opposition Score	Opposition Score	Rank
Juan Holgado	Individual	1255	45	did not advance					
Alfonso Menéndez	Individual	1257	42	did not advance					
Antonio Vázquez	Individual	1291	18	Greenham (AUS); L 96–100	did not advance				
Juan Holgado; Alfonso Menéndez; Antonio Vázquez	Team	3803	10	—N/a	Denmark; W 233–230	Unified Team; W 238–229	Great Britain; W 234–236	Finland; W 238–236	1st place, gold medalist(s)

Women

Athlete	Event	Ranking round		Round of 32	Round of 16	Quarterfinals	Semifinals	Final / BM	
Athlete	Event	Score	Seed	Opposition Score	Opposition Score	Opposition Score	Opposition Score	Opposition Score	Rank
Teresa Fernández	Individual	1254	42	did not advance					

== Athletics ==
Key

- Note–Ranks given for track events are within the athlete's heat only
- Q = Qualified for the next round
- q = Qualified for the next round as a fastest loser or, in field events, by position without achieving the qualifying target
- NR = National record
- N/A = Round not applicable for the event
- Bye = Athlete not required to compete in round
- NM = No mark

Track & road events
Men

Athlete	Event	Heat		Quarterfinal		Semifinal		Final	
Athlete	Event	Result	Rank	Result	Rank	Result	Rank	Result	Rank
Juan Jesús Trapero	100 m	10.64	4	did not advance					
Miguel Ángel Gómez	200 m	21.46	5 q	21.32	8	did not advance			
Cayetano Cornet	400 m	46.13	4 q	46.27	6	did not advance			
José Arconada	800 m	1:49.23	4	—N/a		did not advance			
Tomás de Teresa	800 m	1:46.78	2 Q	—N/a		1:46.08	4	did not advance	
Luis Javier González	800 m	1:46.65	3 q	—N/a		1:47.09	6	did not advance	
Fermín Cacho	1500 m	3:37.04	1 Q	—N/a		3:34.93	2 Q	3:40.12	1st place, gold medalist(s)
José Luis González	1500 m	3:46.75	7	—N/a		did not advance			
Manuel Pancorbo	1500 m	3:37.62	6 q	—N/a		3:39.52	4 Q	3:43.51	11
Abel Antón	5000 m	13:31.48	3 Q	—N/a				13:27.80	8
Martín Fiz	5000 m	13:42.20	7	—N/a				did not advance	
Antonio Serrano	5000 m	13:42.94	6	—N/a				did not advance	
José Carlos Adán	10,000 m	28:50.38	11	—N/a				did not advance	
Carlos de la Torre	10,000 m	28:55.47	15	—N/a				did not advance	
Alejandro Gómez	10,000 m	DNF		—N/a				did not advance	
Carlos Sala	110 m hurdles	13.62	3 Q	13.80	5	did not advance			
José Javier Arqués; Sergio López; Enrique Talavera; Juan Jesús Trapero	4 × 100 m relay	39.60	1 Q	—N/a		39.62	5	did not advance	
Cayetano Cornet; Ángel Heras; Manuel Moreno Sánchez; Antonio Sánchez	4 × 400 m relay	3:04.60	4	—N/a				did not advance	
Diego García	Marathon	—N/a						2:14:56	9
Rodrigo Gavela	Marathon	—N/a						2:16:23	18
José Esteban Montiel	Marathon	—N/a						2:19:15	32
Valentí Massana	20 km walk	—N/a						DSQ	
Daniel Plaza	20 km walk	—N/a						1:21:45	1st place, gold medalist(s)
Miguel Ángel Prieto	20 km walk	—N/a						1:26:38	10
Jaime Barroso	50 km walk	—N/a						4:02:08	14
Jesús Ángel García	50 km walk	—N/a						3:58:43	10
José Marín	50 km walk	—N/a						3:58:41	9

Women

Athlete	Event	Heat		Quarterfinal		Semifinal		Final	
Athlete	Event	Result	Rank	Result	Rank	Result	Rank	Result	Rank
Cristina Castro Salvador	100 m	11.72	5 q	11.79	8	did not advance			
Julia Merino	400 m	52.90	3 Q	52.43	5	did not advance			
Amaia Andrés	800 m	2:02.67	5	—N/a		did not advance			
Maite Zúñiga	1500 m	4:07.82	1 Q	—N/a		4:04.00	5 Q	4:00.59	6
Estela Estévez	3000 m	8:55.70	7	—N/a				did not advance	
María José Mardomingo	100 m hurdles	13.58	5	did not advance					
Miriam Alonso	400 m hurdles	57.66	5	—N/a		did not advance			
Gregoria Ferrer; Esther Lahoz; Julia Merino; Cristina Pérez	4 × 400 m relay	3:31.35	6	—N/a				did not advance	
Emilia Cano	10 km walk	—N/a						47:03	22
Mari Cruz Díaz	10 km walk	—N/a						45:32	10
Encarna Granados	10 km walk	—N/a						46:00	14

Field events
Men

Athlete	Event	Qualification		Final	
Athlete	Event	Distance	Position	Distance	Position
Ángel Hernández	Long jump	NM		did not advance	
Jesús Oliván	Long jump	7.78	18	did not advance	
Santiago Moreno	Triple jump	16.04	28	did not advance	
Gustavo Adolfo Becker	High jump	2.26	8 q	2.28	11
Arturo Ortiz	High jump	2.15	27	did not advance	
Javier García	Pole vault	5.55	7 q	5.75	3rd place, bronze medalist(s)
Daniel Martí	Pole vault	5.40	19	did not advance	
Alberto Ruiz	Pole vault	5.55	7 q	5.30	10
David Martínez	Discus throw	61.22	9	60.16	9
Julián Sotelo	Javelin throw	75.34	20	did not advance	

Women

Athlete	Event	Qualification		Final	
Athlete	Event	Distance	Position	Distance	Position
Margarita Ramos	Shot put	16.82	13	did not advance	
Ángeles Barreiro	Discus throw	53.14	25	did not advance	

Combined events – Men's decathlon

Athlete	Event	100 m	LJ	SP	HJ	400 m	110H	DT	PV	JT	1500 m	Final	Rank
Francisco Javier Benet	Result	11.41	6.94	12.99	1.91	49.60	14.86	40.10	4.50	59.68	4:42.58	7484	22
Francisco Javier Benet	Points	771	799	667	723	833	867	667	760	733	664	7484	22
Álvaro Burrell	Result	10.95	7.56	14.41	2.03	48.14	15.18	43.52	4.50	45.66	4:22.42	7952	16
Álvaro Burrell	Points	872	950	753	831	902	828	736	760	525	795	7952	16
Antonio Peñalver	Result	11.09	7.54	16.50	2.06	49.66	14.58	49.68	4.90	58.64	4:38.02	8412	2nd place, silver medalist(s)
Antonio Peñalver	Points	841	945	882	859	830	901	864	880	717	693	8412	2nd place, silver medalist(s)

== Badminton ==
Athlete	Event	First round	Second round	Third round	Quarterfinal	Semifinal	Final / BM	
Athlete	Event	Opposition Score	Opposition Score	Opposition Score	Opposition Score	Opposition Score	Opposition Score	Rank
David Serrano	Men's singles	Motoyama (JPN); L (9–15, 10–15)	did not advance					
Esther Sanz	Women's singles	Cator (AUS); L (9–11, 5–11)	did not advance					

== Baseball ==
=== Men's team competition ===
Spain came within half an inning of losing all seven of its preliminary round games in the first official Olympic baseball tournament. Trailing Puerto Rico 6-4 going into the bottom of the ninth, Spain rallied for three runs to win its only Olympic victory in the sport.

- Preliminary round

- Lost to United States (1:4)
- Lost to Japan (1:12)
- Lost to Dominican Republic (2:11)
- Lost to Chinese Taipei (0:20)
- Lost to Cuba (0:18)
- Lost to Italy (1:14)
- Defeated Puerto Rico (7:6) → 8th place

- Men's Team Roster

- Antonio Salazar
- Enrique Cortés Pes
- Félix Manuel Cano
- Francisco Javier Aristu
- Gabriel Valarezo
- Javier Díez
- Jesús Lisarri
- José Arza
- José Luis Becerra
- José María Pulido
- Juan Ignacio Damborenea
- Juan Manuel Salmerón
- Juan Pedro Belza
- Luis Carlos León
- Manuel Martínez
- Miguel Ángel Pariente
- Miguel Stella
- Oscar Rebolleda
- Xavier Camps
- Xavier Civit

== Basketball ==
=== Men's tournament ===
Team roster

Spain men's national basketball team roster
Players
Coaches

Pos.	No.	Name	Age – Date of birth	Height	Club	Ctr.
G	4	Jordi Villacampa	28 – 11 October 1963		Joventut Badalona	(Spain)
G	5	José Arcega	28 – 31 May 1964		CAI Zaragoza	(Spain)
G	6	José Biriukov	29 – 3 February 1963		Real Madrid	(Spain)
G	7	Rafael Jofresa	25 – 22 September 1966		Joventut Badalona	(Spain)
F	8	Andrés Jiménez	30 – 6 June 1962		FC Barcelona	(Spain)
C	9	Santiago Aldama	23 – 7 December 1968		CAI Zaragoza	(Spain)
G	10	Tomás Jofresa	22 – 25 January 1970		Joventut Badalona	(Spain)
F	11	Xavi Fernández	24 – 12 February 1968		León	(Spain)
G	12	Alberto Herreros	23 – 20 April 1969	2.00 m (6 ft 7 in)	Estudiantes	(Spain)
C	13	Juan Antonio Orenga	25 – 29 July 1966		Estudiantes	(Spain)
C	14	Enrique Andreu	24 – 20 October 1967		CAI Zaragoza	(Spain)
F	15	Juan Antonio San Epifanio	33 – 12 June 1959		FC Barcelona	(Spain)

Head coach

- (Spain) Antonio Díaz-Miguel

Legend

- Club – describes last
  club before the competition
- Age – describes age
  on 26 July 1992

Group play

Pos	Team	Pld	W	L	PF	PA	PD	Pts	Qualification
1	United States	5	5	0	579	350	+229	10	Quarterfinals
2	Croatia	5	4	1	423	400	+23	9	Quarterfinals
3	Brazil	5	2	3	420	463	−43	7 (Note: Head-to-head record: Brazil 1–0 Germany)	Quarterfinals
4	Germany	5	2	3	369	432	−63	7	Quarterfinals
5	Angola	5	1	4	324	392	−68	6 (Note: Head-to-head record: Angola 1–0 Spain)	9th−12th classification round
6	Spain (H)	5	1	4	398	476	−78	6	9th−12th classification round

Source: FIBA
Rules for classification: 1) points; 2) head-to-head points; 3) head-to-head goal average; 4) head-to-head number of points scored.
(H) Hosts
Notes:

26 July 1992
20:30
v

Boxscore

Germany	83–74	Spain
Scoring by half: 46–39, 37–35
Pts: Schrempf 26; Rebs: Gnad 20; Asts: Schrempf 4		Pts: Villacampa 21; Rebs: San Epifanio 7 Asts: Villacampa 2

Palau Municipal d'Esports de Badalona, Barcelona

27 July 1992
22:30
v

Boxscore

Brazil	100–101	Spain
Scoring by half: 43–53, 57–48
Pts: Schmidt 44; Rebs: Victalino 10; Asts: Villas 3		Pts: Villacampa 25; Rebs: Jiménez 7 Asts: Herreros 5

Palau Municipal d'Esports de Badalona, Barcelona

29 July 1992
22:30
v

Boxscore

Croatia	88–79	Spain
Scoring by half: 45–42, 43–37
Pts: Petrović 28; Rebs: Rađa 8 Asts: Kukoč 7		Pts: Villacampa 19; Rebs: Jiménez 7 Asts: Jofresa 5

Palau Municipal d'Esports de Badalona, Barcelona

31 July 1992
11:30
v

Boxscore

Spain	63–83	Angola
Scoring by half: 36–37, 27–43
Pts: Jiménez, Villacampa 16; Rebs: Andreu 9 Asts: Villacampa 3		Pts: Conceição 22; Rebs: Guimarães 10; Asts: Conceição 3

Palau Municipal d'Esports de Badalona, Barcelona

2 August 1992
22:30
v

Boxscore

Spain	81–122	United States
Scoring by half: 35–65, 46–57
Pts: Jiménez 23; Rebs: Andreu 7 Asts: Jiménez 6		Pts: Barkley 20; Rebs: Ewing 10; Asts: Pippen 9

Palau Municipal d'Esports de Badalona, Barcelona

Classification round, 9th to 12th place

4 August 1992
11:30
v

Boxscore

Venezuela	81–95	Spain
Scoring by half: 40–46, 41–49
Pts: Herrera 26; Rebs: Estaba 8 Asts: Herrera 3		Pts: Herreros 25; Rebs: Andreu 9 Asts: Jofresa 4

Palau Municipal d'Esports de Badalona, Barcelona

9th place match

6 August 1992
11:00
v

Boxscore

Angola	75–78	Spain
Scoring by half: 39–41, 36–37
Pts: Conceição 21; Rebs: Conceição 7 Asts: Conceição 4		Pts: Jiménez 15; Rebs: Orenga 6 Asts: Arcega 4

Palau Municipal d'Esports de Badalona, Barcelona

=== Women's tournament ===
Team roster

Spain women's national basketball team roster
Players
Coaches

Pos.	No.	Name	Age – Date of birth	Height	Club	Ctr.
G	4	Patricia Hernández	21 – 8 September 1970
F	5	Carolina Mújica	27 – 14 September 1964		BEX Banco Exterior	(Spain)
F	6	Blanca Ares	21 – 30 December 1970		BEX Banco Exterior	(Spain)
C	7	María Pilar Alonso	23 – 8 October 1968		Dorna Godella	(Spain)
	8	Mónica Pulgar	21 – 19 May 1971
C	9	Margarita Geuer	26 – 3 May 1966		BEX Banco Exterior	(Spain)
G	10	Almudena Vara	21 – 23 March 1971
G	11	Ana Belén Álvaro	23 – 24 April 1969		Dorna Godella	(Spain)
G	12	Mónica Messa	25 – 7 October 1966		BEX Banco Exterior	(Spain)
F	13	Marina Ferragut	20 – 11 February 1972	1.90 m (6 ft 3 in)	BEX Banco Exterior	(Spain)
C	14	Elisabeth Cebrián	21 – 7 February 1971	1.96 m (6 ft 5 in)	BEX Banco Exterior	(Spain)
	15	Carlota Castrejana	19 – 25 April 1973

Head coach

- (Spain) José Buceta

Legend

- Club – describes last
  club before the competition
- Age – describes age
  on 26 July 1992

Group play

Pos	Team	Pld	W	L	PF	PA	PD	Pts	Qualification
1	United States	3	3	0	318	181	+137	6	Semifinals
2	China	3	2	1	205	226	−21	5	Semifinals
3	Spain	3	1	2	181	238	−57	4	Classification round
4	Czechoslovakia	3	0	3	183	242	−59	3	Classification round

Source: FIBA
Rules for classification: 1) points; 2) head-to-head points; 3) head-to-head goal average; 4) head-to-head number of points scored.

30 July 1992
20:00

Boxscore

China	66–63	Spain
Scoring by half: 27–31, 39–32
Pts: Peng 19; Rebs: 4 players 4 Asts: Li D., Li X., Liu J. 2		Pts: Ares 20; Rebs: Geuer 8 Asts: 5 players 1

Palau Municipal d'Esports de Badalona, Barcelona

1 August 1992
20:00

Boxscore

Czechoslovakia	58–59	Spain
Scoring by half: 30–27, 28–32
Pts: Buriánová 21; Rebs: Buriánová 7 Asts: Buriánová 4		Pts: Álvaro 10; Rebs: Geuer 7 Asts: Ares, Geuer 3

Palau Municipal d'Esports de Badalona, Barcelona

3 August 1992
22:00

Boxscore

Spain	59–114	United States
Scoring by half: 32–51, 27–63
Pts: Ares 13; Rebs: Geuer 6 Asts: Ares 4		Pts: Dixon 28; Rebs: McClain 8 Asts: Edwards 6

Palau Municipal d'Esports de Badalona, Barcelona

Classification round, 5th to 8th place

5 August 1992
20:00

Boxscore

Spain	92–80 (OT)	Italy
Scoring by half: 37–33, 28–32 Overtime: 13–13, 14–2
Pts: Álvaro, Ares 19; Rebs: Geuer 14; Asts: Geuer, Messa, Mújica 3		Pts: Fullin 18; Rebs: Rossi 5 Asts: Fullin 5

Palau Municipal d'Esports de Badalona, Barcelona

5th place match

7 August 1992
11:00

Boxscore

Czechoslovakia	58–59	Spain
Scoring by half: 29–25, 29–34
Pts: Bieliková 14; Rebs: Buriánová 4 Asts: Bieliková, Chupíková 2		Pts: Geuer 11; Rebs: Geuer 9 Asts: Ares, Messa 3

Palau Municipal d'Esports de Badalona, Barcelona

== Boxing ==
Athlete	Event	Round of 32	Round of 16	Quarterfinals	Semifinals	Final	
Athlete	Event	Opposition Result	Opposition Result	Opposition Result	Opposition Result	Opposition Result	Rank
Rafael Lozano	Light flyweight	Fana Thwala (RSA); W 9–2	Griffin (USA); W 6–2	Marcelo (CUB); L 3–11	did not advance		
Óscar Vega	Bantamweight	Molina (ARG); L 9–2	did not advance				
Faustino Reyes	Featherweight	Carr (GBR); W 22–10	Kamsing (THA); W 24–15	Suarez (CUB); W 17–7	Paliani (EUN); W 14–9	Tews (GER); L 9–16	2nd place, silver medalist(s)
Óscar Palomino	Lightweight	Grigorian (EUN); L 10–11	did not advance				
Sergio Rey	Light welterweight	Kjäll (FIN); L RSC	did not advance				
Víctor Baute	Welterweight	Reilly (USA); L RSC	did not advance				
José Ortega	Heavyweight	Bye	Tua (NZL); L RSC	did not advance			

== Canoeing ==
=== Slalom ===
Athlete	Event	Run 1	Run 2	Best	Rank
Pere Guerrero	Men's C-1	148.49	144.74	144.74	28
Marc Vicente	Men's C-1	142.88	139.38	139.38	24
Javier Etxaniz	Men's K-1	174.54	116.47	116.47	22
José María Martínez	Men's K-1	130.15	124.69	124.69	35
María Eizmendi	Women's K-1	143.39	157.84	143.39	14
Cristina Martínez	Women's K-1	168.14	149.02	149.02	17

=== Sprint ===
Athlete	Event	Heats		Repechage		Semifinals		Final	
Athlete	Event	Time	Rank	Time	Rank	Time	Rank	Time	Rank
Francisco López	Men's C-1 500 m	1:58.84	5	1:56.60	4 Q	1:57.51	7	did not advance	
José Alfredo Bea	Men's C-1 1000 m	4:09.18	4 Q	Bye		4:25.63	8	did not advance	
Enrique Míguez; Narciso Suárez	Men's C-2 500 m	1:43.63	4	—N/a		1:42.82	4	did not advance	
Gregorio Vicente	Men's K-1 500 m	1:46.68	6	1:41.72	4 Q	1:43.53	7	did not advance	
Óscar García	Men's K-1 1000 m	3:45.08	5	3:36.70	4 Q	3:41.84	7	did not advance	
Juan José Roman; Juan Manuel Sánchez	Men's K-2 500 m	1:33.61	2 Q	Bye		1:30.42	4 Q	1:30.93	4
Juan José Roman; Juan Manuel Sánchez	Men's K-2 1000 m	3:21.64	2 Q	Bye		3:20.30	4 Q	3:43.43	9
Francisco Cabezas; Miguel García; Alberto Sánchez; Gregorio Vicente	Men's K-4 1000 m	2:58.67	3	—N/a		3:00.17	5	did not advance	
Susana Torrejón	Women's K-1 500 m	2:03.76	5	—N/a		2:00.33	7	did not advance	
Joaquina Costa; Belén Sánchez	Women's K-2 500 m	1:46.64	6	—N/a		1:53.37	4 Q	1:44.96	9
Luisa Álvarez; Joaquina Costa; Ana María Penas; Belén Sánchez	Women's K-4 500 m	1:38.72	6	—N/a		1:40.17	4	did not advance	

== Cycling ==
Fourteen cyclists, eleven men and three women, represented Spain in 1992. José Moreno won gold in the 1 km time trial.

=== Road ===
Athlete	Event	Time	Rank
Ángel Edo	Men's road race	4:35:56	15
Kiko García	Men's road race	4:35:56	24
Eleuterio Mancebo	Men's road race	DNF	
Miguel Fernández; Álvaro González de Galdeano; Eleuterio Mancebo; David Plaza	Men's team time trial	2:06:11	5
Ainhoa Artolazábal	Women's road race	2:05:13	34
Belén Cuevas	Women's road race	2:05:26	35
Teodora Ruano	Women's road race	2:09:42	42

=== Track ===
Sprint

Athlete	Event	Qualification		Round 1	Repechage 1 Semifinals	Repechage 1 Final	Round 2	Repechage 2	Quarterfinals	Semifinals	Final	
Athlete	Event	Time Speed (km/h)	Rank	Opposition Time Speed (km/h)	Opposition Time Speed (km/h)	Opposition Time Speed (km/h)	Opposition Time Speed (km/h)	Opposition Time Speed (km/h)	Opposition Time Speed (km/h)	Opposition Time Speed (km/h)	Opposition Time Speed (km/h)	Rank
José Manuel Moreno	Men's sprint	10.550; 68.246	5	Furrer (SUI); Myers (JAM); 11.278; 63.841	Bye		Kovsh (EUN); Lovito (ARG); 11.216; 64.194	Bye	Chiappa (ITA)	did not advance		8

Points race

Athlete	Event	Semifinals		Final	
Athlete	Event	Points	Rank	Points	Rank
Gabriel Aynat	Men's points race	7	16	did not advance	

Pursuit

Athlete	Event	Qualification		Quarterfinals	Semifinals	Final	
Athlete	Event	Time Speed (km/h)	Rank	Opposition Time Speed (km/h)	Opposition Time Speed (km/h)	Opposition Time Speed (km/h)	Rank
Adolfo Alperi	Men's individual pursuit	4:42.538; 50.996	14 q	Karśnicki (POL); 4:34.760; 52.409	did not advance		7
Adolfo Alperi; Gabriel Aynat; Jonathan Garrido; Santos González	Men's team pursuit	4:23.013; 54.750	10	did not advance			

Qualification Legend: Q = Qualify to quarterfinals Group A (medal); q = Qualify to quarterfinals Group B (non-medal)

Time trial

Athlete	Event	Time	Rank
José Manuel Moreno	Men's time trial	1:03.342	1st place, gold medalist(s)

== Diving ==
Athlete	Event	Preliminaries		Final	
Athlete	Event	Points	Rank	Points	Rank
José Miguel Gil	Men's 3 m springboard	336.84	23	did not advance	
Rafael Álvarez	Men's 10 m platform	390.81	8	524.25	9
Julia Cruz	Women's 3 m springboard	282.69	8	436.47	12

== Equestrianism ==
=== Dressage ===
Athlete	Horse	Event	Grand Prix		Grand Prix Special	
Athlete	Horse	Event	Score	Rank	Score	Rank
Juan Matute	N'Est Pas	Individual	1426	43	did not advance	

=== Eventing ===
Athlete	Horse	Event	Dressage		Cross-country			Jumping	Total	
Athlete	Horse	Event	Penalties	Rank	Penalties	Total	Rank	Penalties	Penalties	Rank
Luis Álvarez de Cervera	Mr. Chrisalis	Individual	65.00	43	37.20	102.20	13	0.00	102.20	7
Santiago Centenera	Just Dixon	Individual	62.60	30	Eliminated			did not advance		
Santiago de la Rocha	Kinvarra	Individual	64.60	39	42.80	107.40	18	15.00	122.40	19
Fernando Villalón	Clever Night	Individual	71.40	60	82.80	154.20	44	10.00	164.20	38
Luis Álvarez de Cervera; Santiago Centenera; Santiago de la Rocha; Fernando Villalón	Mr. Chrisalis; Just Dixon; Kinvarra; Clever Night	Team	192.20	13	162.80	363.80	6	25.00	388.80	5

=== Jumping ===
Athlete	Horse	Event	Qualifying					Final			
Athlete	Horse	Event	Round 1	Round 2	Round 3	Total	Rank	Round 1	Round 2	Total	Rank
Luis Álvarez de Cervera	Let's Go	Individual	76.50	62.00	—	138.50	44	8.00	DNS	Eliminated	
Luis Astolfi	Fino	Individual	70.50	84.50	—	155.00	27	4.00	21.50	25.50	19
Cayetano Martínez	Palestro II	Individual	49.50	36.00	57.00	142.50	43	did not advance			
Enrique Sarasola Jr.	Minstrel	Individual	56.00	56.00	78.00	190.00	11	12.00	did not advance		
Luis Álvarez de Cervera; Luis Astolfi; Cayetano Martínez; Enrique Sarasola Jr.	Let's Go; Fino; Palestro II; Minstrel	Team	—N/a					12.75	12.75	25.50	4

== Fencing ==
17 fencers, 15 men and 2 women represented Spain in 1992.

Men

Athlete	Event	Group Stage			Round of 64	Round of 32	Round of 16	Round of 8	Repechage Qualifying	Repechage R1	Repechage R2	Repechage R3	Quarterfinal	Semifinal	Final / BM	
Athlete	Event	W	L	Rank	Opposition Score	Opposition Score	Opposition Score	Opposition Score	Opposition Score	Opposition Score	Opposition Score	Opposition Score	Opposition Score	Opposition Score	Opposition Score	Rank
Fernando de la Peña	Épée	3	3	29 Q	Kuhn (SUI); W 3–5, 6–4, 6–4	Kulcsár (HUN); W 6–5, 5–6, 6–5	Kaaberma (EST); L 4–6, 5–6	To Repechage R1	Bye	Mazzoni (ITA); L 5–1, 2–5, 5–3	did not advance					
Raúl Maroto	Épée	3	3	35 Q	Chouinard (CAN); L 5–6, 3–5	did not advance										
Manuel Pereira	Épée	2	4	47 Q	Kolobkov (EUN); L 1–5, 6–5, 1–5	did not advance										
Fernando de la Peña; Ángel Fernández; César González; Raúl Maroto; Manuel Pereira	Team épée	1	1	2 Q	—N/a								France; L 2–8	did not advance		
Ramiro Bravo	Foil	3	3	27 Q	Wu (HKG); W 6–4, 3–5, 5–3	Érsek (HUN); L 1–5, 6–5, 2–5	To Repechage Qualifying		Groc (FRA); L 1–5, 6–4, 4–6	did not advance						
Andrés García	Foil	2	4	46 Q	Ichigatani (JPN); W 3–5, 5–0, 5–1	Numa (ITA); L 2–5, 0–5	To Repechage Qualifying		Haibin (CHN); W 5–3, 5–1	Cerioni (ITA); W 5–1, 4–6, 6–4	Ye (CHN); L 2–5, 2–5	did not advance				
José Francisco Guerra	Foil	2	3	37 Q	Busa (HUN); L 0–5, 5–2, 5–6	did not advance										
Ramiro Bravo; Andrés Crespo; Jesús Esperanza; Andrés García; José Francisco Guerra	Team foil	0	2	3	—N/a								did not advance			
José Luis Álvarez	Sabre	DNS			did not advance											
Antonio García	Sabre	4	1	6 Q	Bye	Zavieh (GBR); W 5–3, 6–4	Gniewkowski (POL); W 6–5, 5–3	Köves (HUN); W 5–2, 2–5, 5–3	Bye				Marin (ITA); L 3–5, 5–4, 2–5	did not advance		
Raúl Peinador	Sabre	3	3	21 Q	Bye	Marin (ITA); L 3–5, 5–6	To Repechage Qualifying		Yang (CHN); L 5–6, 4–5	did not advance						
José Luis Álvarez; Alberto Falcón; Antonio García; Raúl Peinador; Marco Antonio Rioja	Team sabre	0	2	3	—N/a								did not advance			

Women

Athlete	Event	Group Stage			Round of 64	Round of 32	Round of 16	Round of 8	Repechage Qualifying	Repechage R1	Repechage R2	Repechage R3	Quarterfinal	Semifinal	Final / BM	
Athlete	Event	W	L	Rank	Opposition Score	Opposition Score	Opposition Score	Opposition Score	Opposition Score	Opposition Score	Opposition Score	Opposition Score	Opposition Score	Opposition Score	Opposition Score	Rank
Rosa María Castillejo	Foil	3	3	25 Q	Bye	Funkenhauser (GER); L 1–5, 2–5	To Repechage Qualifying		Lee (KOR); L 2–5, 5–3, 6–5	did not advance						
Montserat Esquerdo	Foil	1	4	35 Q	Bau (GER); L 1–5, 3–5	did not advance										

== Football ==
Summary

Key:

- A.E.T – After extra time.
- P – Match decided by penalty-shootout.

Team	Event	Group Stage				Quarterfinal	Semifinal	Final / BM	
Team	Event	Opposition Score	Opposition Score	Opposition Score	Rank	Opposition Score	Opposition Score	Opposition Score	Rank
Spain men's	Men's tournament	Colombia; W 4–0	Egypt; W 2–0	Qatar; W 2–0	1	Italy; W 1–0	Ghana; W 2–0	Poland; W 3–2	1st place, gold medalist(s)

Team roster

Head coach: Vicente Miera

No.	Pos.	Player	DoB	Age	Caps	Club	Tournament games	Tournament goals	Minutes played	Sub off	Sub on	Cards yellow/red
1	GK	Santiago Cañizares	18 December 1969	22	6	(Spain) Mérida
2	DF	Albert Ferrer	6 June 1970	22	?	(Spain) Barcelona	5		450			2/0
3	DF	Mikel Lasa	9 September 1971	21	?	(Spain) Real Madrid	6		501	1
4	DF	Roberto Solozábal	15 September 1969	22	?	(Spain) Atlético Madrid	6	1	540
5	DF	Juanma López	3 September 1969	22	?	(Spain) Atlético Madrid	4		293			0/1
6	MF	David Villabona	5 December 1969	22	?	(Spain) Athletic Bilbao	2		34		2	1/0
7	MF	José Amavisca	19 June 1971	21	?	(Spain) Lleida	3		130	1	2
8	MF	Luis Enrique	8 May 1970	22	?	(Spain) Real Madrid	6	1	540
9	MF	Pep Guardiola	18 January 1971	21	?	(Spain) Barcelona	6	1	474	2		1/0
10	DF	Abelardo Fernández	19 March 1970	22	?	(Spain) Sporting de Gijón	5	2	413			0/1
11	FW	Javier Manjarín	31 December 1969	22	?	(Spain) Sporting de Gijón
12	DF	Paqui	6 December 1970	21	?	(Spain) Tenerife
13	GK	Toni Jiménez	12 October 1970	21	?	(Spain) Figueres	6		540
14	MF	Gabriel Vidal	5 October 1969	22	?	(Spain) Mallorca	2		9		2
15	MF	Paco Soler	5 March 1970	22	?	(Spain) Mallorca	4	1	277		1
16	DF	Miguel Hernández	19 February 1970	22	?	(Spain) Rayo Vallecano	2		118		1
17	DF	Rafael Berges	21 January 1971	21	?	(Spain) Tenerife	6	2	535	1		1/0
18	FW	Antonio Pinilla	25 February 1971	21	?	(Spain) Mallorca	2		33		2
19	FW	Kiko	26 April 1972	20	?	(Spain) Cádiz	6	5	520	3
20	FW	Alfonso Pérez	26 September 1972	19	?	(Spain) Real Madrid	5	1	401	2		2/0

- Preliminary round (group C)

- Spain — Colombia 4-0 (3-0)
- Spain — Egypt 2-0 (0-0)
- Spain — Qatar 2-0 (1-0)

- Quarterfinals

- Spain — Italy 1-0 (0-0)

- Semifinals

- Spain — Ghana 2-0 (1-0)

- Final

- Spain — Poland 3-2 (0-1) → Gold Medal

== Gymnastics ==
=== Artistic ===
Men

Athlete	Event	Qualification								Final							
Athlete	Event	Apparatus						Total	Rank	Apparatus						Total	Rank
Athlete	Event	F	PH	R	V	PB	HB	Total	Rank	F	PH	R	V	PB	HB	Total	Rank
Alfonso Rodríguez	All-around	19.225	19.050	19.350	19.000	19.000	19.375	115.000	20	9.600	9.650	9.675	9.600	9.650	9.100	57.275	16
Miguel Ángel Rubio	All-around	18.400	18.775	18.975	17.825	18.800	18.550	111.325	76	did not advance							

Women

Team

Athlete	Event	Apparatus								Total	
Athlete	Event	V		UB		BB		F		Total	
Athlete	Event	C	O	C	O	C	O	C	O	Score	Rank
Alicia Fernández	Team	9.775	9.850	9.750	9.875	9.725	9.550	9.787	9.750	78.062	31 Q
Cristina Fraguas	Team	9.712	9.837	9.900	9.912 Q	9.700	9.725	9.800	9.850	78.436	21 Q
Sonia Fraguas	Team	9.750	9.837	9.387	9.862 Q	9.812	9.787	9.850	9.862	78.147	29 Q
Silvia Martínez	Team	9.687	9.775	9.700	9.337	9.575	9.700	9.637	9.700	77.111	49
Ruth Rollán	Team	9.637	9.837	9.812	9.812	9.637	9.200	9.712	9.750	77.397	42
Eva Rueda	Team	9.837	9.937 Q	9.837	9.900	9.787	9.700	9.825	9.212	78.035	32
Total	Team	98.059		98.360		97.123		97.886		391.428	5

Individual finals

Athlete	Event	Apparatus				Total	
Athlete	Event	V	UB	BB	F	Score	Rank
Alicia Fernández	All-around	9.850	9.800	9.587	9.837	39.074	20
Cristina Fraguas	All-around	9.837	9.800	9.800	9.887	39.324	13
Sonia Fraguas	All-around	9.825	9.887	9.862	9.850	39.424	9
Eva Rueda	Vault	9.787	—N/a			9.787	7
Cristina Fraguas	Uneven bars	—N/a	9.900	—N/a		9.900	7

=== Rhythmic ===
Athlete	Event	Preliminary round						Final round					
Athlete	Event	Apparatus				Total		Apparatus				Total	
Athlete	Event	Rope	Hoop	Ball	Clubs	Score	Rank	Rope	Hoop	Ball	Clubs	Score	Rank
Carmen Acedo	All-around	9.425	9.475	9.600	9.450	37.950	4 Q	9.550	9.600	9.550	9.550	57.225	4
Carolina Pascual	All-around	9.600	9.600	9.625	9.575	38.400	3 Q	9.650	9.700	9.775	9.775	58.100	2nd place, silver medalist(s)

== Handball ==
Summary

Key:

- ET: After extra time
- P – Match decided by penalty-shootout.

Team	Event	Group Stage						Semifinal	Final / BM	
Team	Event	Opposition Score	Opposition Score	Opposition Score	Opposition Score	Opposition Score	Rank	Opposition Score	Opposition Score	Rank
Spain men's	Men's tournament	France; L 16 – 18	Egypt; W 23 – 18	Romania; W 21 – 20	Unified TeamUnified Team; L 18 – 24	Germany; W 19 – 18	3	Did not advance	5th place match South Korea; W 36 – 21	4
Spain women's	Women's tournament	Austria; L 16 – 20	Norway; L 16 – 20	South Korea; L 18 – 28	—N/a		4	Did not advance	7th place match Nigeria; W 26 – 17	7

=== Men's team competition ===
- Preliminary round (group B)

- Spain — France 16-18
- Spain — Egypt 23-18
- Spain — Romania 21-20
- Spain — Unified Team 18-24
- Spain — Germany 19-18

- Classification Match

- 5th-6th place: Spain — South Korea 36-21 (→ Fifth place)

- Team roster

- Alberto Urdiales
- Aleix Franch
- Angel Hermida
- David Barrufet
- Enric Masip
- Fernando Bolea
- Iñaki Urdangarín
- Jaume Fort
- Javier Cabanas
- Juan Francisco Alemany
- Juan Francisco Muñoz
- Lorenzo Rico
- Luis Eduardo García
- Mateo Garralda
- Ricardo Marín

- Head coach: Javier García Cuesta

=== Women's team competition ===
- Preliminary round (group B)

- Spain — Austria 16-20
- Spain — Norway 16-20
- Spain — South Korea 18-28

- Classification Match

- 7th-8th place: Spain — Nigeria 26-17 (→ Seventh place)

- Team roster

- Amaia Ugartemendía
- Begoña Sánchez
- Blanca Martín-Calero
- Cristina Gómez Arquer
- Dolores Ruiz
- Esperanza Tercero
- Karmele Makazaga
- María Eugenia Sánchez
- Mercedes Fuertes
- Montserrat Marín
- Montserrat Puche
- Paloma Arranz
- Raquel Vizcaíno
- Rita María Hernández

- Head coach: Francisco Sanchez Sanchez

== Hockey ==
Summary

Key:

- FT – After full time.
- P – Match decided by penalty-shootout.

Team	Event	Group stage						Quarter-finals	Semi-finals	GM / BM	
Team	Event	Opposition Score	Opposition Score	Opposition Score	Opposition Score	Opposition Score	Rank	Opposition Score	Opposition Score	Opposition Score	Rank
Spain men's	Men's tournament	New Zealand; W 3–0	Netherlands; L 2–3	Malaysia; W 5–2	CIS; W 4–0	Pakistan; L 1–6	3	Did not advance	5–8th place semi-finals India; W 2–0	5th place final Great Britain; W 2–1	5
Spain women's	Women's tournament	Germany; D 2–2	Canada; W 2–1	Australia; W 1–0	—N/a		2 Q	—N/a	South Korea; W 2–1	Germany; W 2–1	1st place, gold medalist(s)

=== Men's tournament ===
- Preliminary round (group B)

- Spain — New Zealand 3-0
- Spain — Malaysia 5-2
- Spain — Unified Team 4-0
- Spain — Pakistan 1-6
- Spain — Netherlands 2-3

- Classification Matches

- 5th-8th place: Spain — India 2-0
- 5th-6th place: Spain — Great Britain 2-1 (→ Fifth place)

- Team roster

- Santiago Grau (gk)
- Ignacio Escudé (c)
- Joaquín Malgosa
- Miguel Ortego
- Juantxo García-Mauriño
- Jaime Amat
- Jordi Aviles
- Pedro Jufresa
- José Antonio Iglesias
- Xavier Escudé
- Javier Arnau
- Victor Pujol
- Juan Dinarés
- David Freixa
- Pablo Usoz
- Ramón Jufresa (gk)

- Head coach: Santiago Cortes

=== Women's tournament ===
Team roster

The following players represented Spain:

Head coach: (Spain) José Manuel Brasa

No.	Pos.	Player	Date of birth (age)	Caps	Club
1		Mariví González	27 February 1961 (aged 31)		
2		Natalia Dorado	25 February 1967 (aged 25)		
3		Virginia Ramírez	22 May 1964 (aged 28)		
4		María Carmen Barea	5 October 1966 (aged 25)		
5		Silvia Manrique	6 March 1973 (aged 19)		
6		Nagore Gabellanes	25 January 1973 (aged 19)		
7		María Ángeles Rodríguez	12 April 1957 (aged 35)		
8		Sonia Barrio	13 December 1969 (aged 22)		
9		Celia Corres	22 January 1964 (aged 28)		
10		Elisabeth Maragall	25 November 1970 (aged 21)		
11		Teresa Motos	29 December 1963 (aged 28)		
12		Maider Tellería	14 July 1973 (aged 19)		
13		Mercedes Coghen	2 August 1962 (aged 29)		
14		Nuria Olivé	20 August 1968 (aged 23)		
15		Anna Maiques	3 September 1967 (aged 24)		
16		María Isabel Martínez	16 October 1967 (aged 24)		

- Preliminary round (group A)

- Spain — Germany 2-2
- Spain — Canada 2-1
- Spain — Australia 1-0

- Semi Finals

- Spain — South Korea 2-1 (after extra time)

- Final

- Spain — Germany 2-1 (after extra time) → Gold Medal)

== Judo ==
Men

Athlete	Event	Round of 64	Round of 32	Round of 16	Quarterfinals	Semifinals	Repechage R1	Repechage R2	Repechage QF	Repechage SF	Final / BM	
Athlete	Event	Opposition Result	Opposition Result	Opposition Result	Opposition Result	Opposition Result	Opposition Result	Opposition Result	Opposition Result	Opposition Result	Opposition Result	Rank
Carlos Sotillo	−60 kg	Bye	Donohue (GBR); L	did not advance								
Francisco Lorenzo	−65 kg	Quellmalz (GER); L	did not advance				El-Murr (LIB); W	Gao (CHN); W	Cantin (CAN); W	Kim (KOR); W	Bronze medal bout Hernández (CUB); L	5
Joaquín Ruiz	−71 kg	Oliveira (BRA); W	Jočić (IOA); W	Dahmani (ALG); L	did not advance							
León Villar	−86 kg	—N/a	Lobenstein (GER); L	did not advance			Vismara (ITA); W	—N/a	Kistler (SUI); L	did not advance		
Ernesto Pérez	+95 kg	—N/a	Billimoria (IND); W	Kim (KOR); W	Douillet (FRA); W	Did not advance	Bye	—N/a	Gordon (GBR); W	Van Barneveld (BEL); L	did not advance	

Women

Athlete	Event	Round of 32	Round of 16	Quarterfinals	Semifinals	Repechage R1	Repechage QF	Repechage SF	Final / BM	
Athlete	Event	Opposition Result	Opposition Result	Opposition Result	Opposition Result	Opposition Result	Opposition Result	Opposition Result	Opposition Result	Rank
Yolanda Soler	−48 kg	Yu (KOR); W	Roszkowska (POL); W	Briggs (GBR); L	Did not advance	Bye	Lastrade (CAN); W	Savón (CUB); L	did not advance	
Almudena Muñoz	−52 kg	Quiring (USA); W	Çalışkan (TUR); W	Rendle (GBR); W	Li (CHN); W	Bye			Mizoguchi (JPN); W	1st place, gold medalist(s)
Miriam Blasco	−56 kg	Bye	Jung (KOR); W	Tateno (JPN); W	González (CUB); W	Bye			Fairbrother (GBR); W	1st place, gold medalist(s)
Begoña Gómez	−61 kg	Bye	Kobayashi (JPN); W	Arad (ISR); L	Did not advance	Bye	Jánošíková (TCH); W	Petrova (EUN); L	did not advance	
María del Carmen Bellón	−66 kg	Bye	Lecat (FRA); L	did not advance						
Cristina Curto	−72 kg	Bye	Tanabe (JPN); L	did not advance						
Inmaculada Vicent	+72 kg	Bye	Zhuang (CHN); L	did not advance		Lee (GBR); L	did not advance			

== Modern pentathlon ==
Three male pentathletes represented Spain in 1992.

Athlete	Event	Fencing	Swimming	Shooting	Running	Riding	Total points	Final rank
Athlete	Event	Points	Points	Points	Points	Points	Total points	Final rank
Jesús Centeno	Individual	796	1240	865	1177	1070	5148	27
Leopoldo Centeno	Individual	728	1240	865	1135	1050	5018	37
Carles Lerín	Individual	643	1180	1000	1210	661	4694	55
Jesús Centeno; Leopoldo Centeno; Carles Lerín	Team	2167	3660	2730	3522	2781	14860	12

== Rowing ==
Athlete	Event	Heats		Repechage		Semifinals		Final	
Athlete	Event	Time	Rank	Time	Rank	Time	Rank	Time	Rank
Miguel Álvarez; José Antonio Merín	Men's double sculls	6:32.67	2 R	6:43.28	1 Q	6:22.36	3 FA	6:26.96	6
José Ignacio Bugarín; Javier Cano; Ibon Urbieta	Men's coxed pair	7:04.67	3 R	7:17.82	3 Q	7:03.99	6 FB	7:15.25	12
Juan Aguirre; Fernando Climent; José María de Marco Pérez; Fernando Molina	Men's coxless four	6:01.51	1 Q	Bye		6:04.59	4 FB	6:06.66	9
José Manuel Bermúdez; Bruno López; José Antonio Rodríguez; Melquiades Verduras	Men's quadruple sculls	5:55.59	5 R	5:57.41	2 Q	5:58.77	6 FB	5:58.33	10
Horacio Allegue; Juan María Altuna; Josu Andueza; Garikoitz Azkue; Andreu Canals; José María Claro; Josép Robert; Jordi Quer; Carlos Front	Men's eight	5:48.36	5 R	5:53.50	5 FC	—N/a		6:10.45	14

Qualification Legend: FA=Final A (medal); FB=Final B (non-medal); FC=Final C (non-medal); FD=Final D (non-medal); FE=Final E (non-medal); FF=Final F (non-medal); SA/B=Semifinals A/B; SC/D=Semifinals C/D; SE/F=Semifinals E/F; QF=Quarterfinals; R=Repechage

== Sailing ==
Men

Athlete	Event	Race										Net points	Final rank
Athlete	Event	1	2	3	4	5	6	7	8	9	10	Net points	Final rank
Asier Fernández	Lechner A-390	21.0	27.0	0.0	10.0	0.0	20.0	8.0	21.0	51.0	10.0	117.0	6
José van der Ploeg	Finn	3.0	11.7	5.7	10.0	3.0	0.0	36.0	—N/a			33.4	1st place, gold medalist(s)
Jordi Calafat; Kiko Sánchez	470	0.0	16.0	0.0	0.0	18.0	16.0	38.0	—N/a			50.0	1st place, gold medalist(s)

Women

Athlete	Event	Race										Net points	Final rank
Athlete	Event	1	2	3	4	5	6	7	8	9	10	Net points	Final rank
Mireia Casas	Lechner A-390	20.0	8.0	24.0	16.0	24.0	13.0	31.0	8.0	31.0	11.7	155.7	12
Natalia Vía Dufresne	Europe	14.0	5.7	11.7	3.0	13.0	10.0	14.0	—N/a			57.4	2nd place, silver medalist(s)
Patricia Guerra; Theresa Zabell	470	24.0	3.0	5.7	0.0	8.0	0.0	13.0	—N/a			29.7	1st place, gold medalist(s)

Mixed

Athlete	Event	Race							Net points	Final rank
Athlete	Event	1	2	3	4	5	6	7	Net points	Final rank
Luis Doreste; Domingo Manrique	Flying Dutchman	0.0	3.0	15.0	3.0	3.0	5.7	19.0	29.7	1st place, gold medalist(s)
José Luis Ballester; Carlos Santacreu	Tornado	24.0	5.7	18.0	23.0	23.0	5.7	21.0	96.4	12
Jaime Piris; Fernando Rita	Star	10.0	19.0	20.0	13.0	20.0	21.0	5.7	87.7	10
Fernando León Boissier; Felipe de Borbón; Alfredo Vázquez	Soling	14.0	8.0	11.7	5.7	17.0	14.0	—N/a	53.4	6

== Shooting ==
Men

Athlete	Event	Qualification		Final	
Athlete	Event	Points	Rank	Points	Rank
Alberto Areces Fernandez	50 m pistol	551	26	did not advance	
Enrique Claverol Martínez	50 m rifle three positions	1152	26	did not advance	
Enrique Claverol Martínez	10 m air rifle	588	13	did not advance	
Jorge González	50 m rifle three positions	1145	35	did not advance	
Jorge González	50 m rifle prone	592	26	did not advance	
Jorge González	10 m air rifle	586	21	did not advance	
Jaime Pares Criville	50 m rifle prone	587	48	did not advance	
Francisco Sanz Cancio	50 m pistol	543	37	did not advance	
Francisco Sanz Cancio	10 m air pistol	576	19	did not advance	
Juan Segui Picornell	25 m rapid fire pistol	582	16	did not advance	

Women

Athlete	Event	Qualification		Final	
Athlete	Event	Points	Rank	Points	Rank
Cristina Fernandez Gonzalez	10 m air rifle	381	39	did not advance	
Nieves Fernandez Mata	50 m rifle three positions	571	24	did not advance	
Nieves Fernandez Mata	10 m air rifle	387	26	did not advance	
Maria Pilar Fernandez	10 m air pistol	382	4 Q	478.5	6
Maria Pilar Fernandez	25 m pistol	576	12	did not advance	
M. E. Suárez García	10 m air pistol	374	31	did not advance	
M. E. Suárez García	25 m pistol	557	41	did not advance	

Open

Athlete	Event	Qualification		Semifinal		Final	
Athlete	Event	Points	Rank	Points	Rank	Points	Rank
Rafael Axpe Elejalde	Trap	139	33	did not advance			
José Bladas Torras	Trap	144	17	194	7	did not advance	
José María Colorado	Skeet	149	3 Q	199	2 Q	222	5
Jorge Guardiola	Skeet	146	21	196	16	did not advance	
Gema Usieto Blázquez	Trap	136	44	did not advance			

== Swimming ==
Men

Athlete	Event	Heat		Final	
Athlete	Event	Time	Rank	Time	Rank
José Luis Ballester	200 m butterfly	2:01.41	21	did not advance	
Ramón Camallonga	100 m breaststroke	1:03.48	21	did not advance	
Jaime Fernández	100 m butterfly	55.62	29	did not advance	
Joaquín Fernández	200 m breaststroke	2:14.93	10 FB	2:15.52	10
Joaquín Fernández	200 m individual medley	2:06.09	23	did not advance	
Martín López-Zubero	100 m backstroke	55.37	4 FA	54.96	4
Martín López-Zubero	200 m backstroke	1:59.22	1 FA	1:58.47 OR	1st place, gold medalist(s)
Martín López-Zubero	100 m butterfly	2:03.07	9 FB	2:03.34	9
Martín López-Zubero	200 m individual medley	54.04	6 FA	54.19	7
Jorge Pérez	200 m backstroke	2:03.68	25	did not advance	
Jorge Pérez	200 m butterfly	2:01.63	24	did not advance	
Jorge Pérez	400 m individual medley	4:21.33	9 FB	4:22.06	11
Sergio Roura	1500 m freestyle	15:26.18	11	did not advance	
Carlos Ventosa	100 m backstroke	56.62	15 FB	56.78	14
Sergio López Miró	100 m breaststroke	1:03.69	23	did not advance	
Sergio López Miró	200 m breaststroke	2:14.68	8 FA	2:13.29	4
Ramón Camallonga; Jaime Fernández; Martín López-Zubero; Carlos Ventosa	4 × 100 m medley relay	3:44.12	10	did not advance	

Women

Athlete	Event	Heat		Final	
Athlete	Event	Time	Rank	Time	Rank
Lourdes Becerra	200 m breaststroke	2:37.69	28	did not advance	
Lourdes Becerra	200 m individual medley	2:23.51	31	did not advance	
Núria Castelló	100 m backstroke	1:05.09	27	did not advance	
Núria Castelló	200 m backstroke	2:16.24	18	did not advance	
Itziar Esparza	400 m freestyle	4:22.27	20	did not advance	
Itziar Esparza	800 m freestyle	8:55.65	16	did not advance	
María Luisa Fernández	200 m butterfly	2:16.18	17	did not advance	
Bárbara Franco	100 m butterfly	1:02.83	26	did not advance	
Claudia Franco	50 m freestyle	26.76	21	did not advance	
Claudia Franco	100 m freestyle	57.57	21	did not advance	
Silvia Parera	200 m individual medley	2:17.97	13 FB	2:18.53	10
Silvia Parera	400 m individual medley	4:50.16	12 FB	4:48.77	12
María Peláez	100 m butterfly	1:02.79	25	did not advance	
María Peláez	200 m butterfly	2:15.77	15 FB	2:15.07	15
Elisenda Pérez	400 m individual medley	4:56.78	22	did not advance	
Natalia Pulido	100 m freestyle	58.54	26	did not advance	
Natalia Pulido	200 m freestyle	2:04.39	24	did not advance	
Cristina Rey	200 m backstroke	2:20.75	34	did not advance	
Rocío Ruiz	100 m breaststroke	1:13.11	22	did not advance	
Núria Castelló; Claudia Franco; María Peláez; Rocío Ruiz	4 × 100 m medley relay	4:19.27	13	did not advance	

== Synchronized swimming ==
Three synchronized swimmers represented Spain in 1992.

Women's solo

- Eva López
- Marta Amorós
- Nuria Ayala

Women's duet

- Eva López
- Marta Amorós

== Table tennis ==
Athlete	Event	Group stage		Round of 16	Quarterfinals	Semifinals	Final / BM	
Athlete	Event	W–L	Rank	Opposition Result	Opposition Result	Opposition Result	Opposition Result	Rank
Roberto Casares	Men's singles	1–2	3	did not advance				
José María Pales	Men's singles	0–3	4	did not advance				
Roberto Casares; José María Pales	Men's doubles	1–2	3	—N/a	did not advance			
Ana María Godes	Women's singles	0–3	4	did not advance				
Gloria Gauchia; Ana María Godes	Women's doubles	0–3	4	—N/a	did not advance			

== Tennis ==
Athlete	Event	Round 1	Round 2	Round 3	Quarterfinals	Semifinals	Final / BM	
Athlete	Event	Opposition Result	Opposition Result	Opposition Result	Opposition Result	Opposition Result	Opposition Result	Rank
Jordi Arrese	Men's singles	Chang (KOR); W 6–4, 6–2, 6–2	Gustafsson (SWE); W 6–2, 4–6, 6–1, 3–6, 9–7	Furlan (ITA); W 6–4, 6–3, 6–2	Lavalle (MEX); W 6–1, 7^{8}–6^{6}, 6–1	Cherkasov (EUN); W 6–4, 7^{7}–6^{4}, 3–6, 6–3	Rosset (SUI); L 6^{2}–7^{7}, 4–6, 6–3, 6–4, 6–8	2nd place, silver medalist(s)
Sergi Bruguera	Men's singles	Castle (GBR); W 6–1, 6–2, 6–3	Koevermans (NED); L 6–1, 3–6, 3–6, 2–6	did not advance				
Emilio Sánchez	Men's singles	Woodbridge (AUS); W 6–1, 7^{7}–6^{1}, 6–2	Camporese (ITA); W 6–4, 6–2, 6–1	Larsson (SWE); W 6–4, 7^{7}–6^{3}, 6^{5}–7^{7}, 6–4	Rosset (SUI); L 4–6, 6^{2}–7^{7}, 6–3, 6^{9}–7^{11}	did not advance		
Sergio Casal; Emilio Sánchez	Men's doubles	Mattar / Oncins (BRA); W 6–3, 3–6, 6^{4}–7^{7}, 6–3, 6–2	Courier / Sampras (USA); W 5–7, 4–6, 6–3, 6–2, 6–2	—N/a	Becker / Stich (GER); L 3–6, 6–4, 6^{9}–7^{11}, 7–5, 6–3	did not advance		
Conchita Martínez	Women's singles	Wiesner (AUT); W 4–6, 6–1, 6–2	Cecchini (ITA); W 6–4, 6–3	Coetzer (RSA); W 6–4, 6–3	Sánchez Vicario (ESP); L 4–6, 4–6	did not advance		
Arantxa Sánchez Vicario	Women's singles	Spîrlea (ROU); W 6–1, 6–3	Endo (JPN); W 6–0, 6–1	Rittner (GER); W 4–6, 6–3, 6–1	Martínez (ESP); W 6–4, 6–4	Capriati (USA); L 3–6, 6–3, 6–1	Did not advance	3rd place, bronze medalist(s)
Conchita Martínez; Arantxa Sánchez Vicario	Women's doubles	D Randriantefy / N Randriantefy (MAD); W 6–0, 6–0	Maleeva-Fragnière / Zardo (SUI); W 6–0, 6–1	—N/a	Demongeot / Tauziat (FRA); W 6–2, 6–4	McQuillan / Provis (AUS); W 6–1, 6–2	G Fernández / MJ Fernández (USA); L 5–7, 6–2, 2–6	2nd place, silver medalist(s)

== Volleyball ==
Summary

Team	Event	Group Stage						Quarterfinal	Semifinal	Final / BM	
Team	Event	Opposition Score	Opposition Score	Opposition Score	Opposition Score	Opposition Score	Rank	Opposition Score	Opposition Score	Opposition Score	Rank
Spain men's	Men's tournament	Canada; W 3–2	Italy; L 0–3	United States; L 2–3	Japan; W 3–2	France; W 3–2	3 Q	Cuba; L 0–3	5th–8th place semifinals Italy; L 0–3	7th place match CIS; L 2–3	8
Spain women's	Women's tournament	CIS; L 0–3	Japan; L 0–3	United States; L 0–3	—N/a		4	did not advance		7th place match China; L 0–3	8

=== Men's team competition ===
- Preliminary round (group A)

- Defeated Canada (3-2)
- Lost to Italy (0-3)
- Lost to Unified States (2-3)
- Defeated Japan (3-2)
- Defeated France (3-2)

- Quarterfinals

- Lost to Cuba (0-3)

- Classification Matches

- 5th/8th place: Lost to Italy (0-3)
- 7th/8th place: Lost to Unified Team (2-3) → 8th place

- Team roster

- Ángel Alonso
- Benjamín Vicedo
- Francisco Hervás
- Héctor López
- Jesús Garrido
- Jesús Sánchez
- Juan Carlos Robles
- Miguel Ángel Maroto
- Rafael Pascual
- Venancio Costa
- Francisco Sánchez
- Ernesto Rodríguez

=== Women's team competition ===
- Preliminary round (group A)

- Lost to Unified Team (0-3)
- Lost to Japan (0-3)
- Lost to Unified States (0-3)

- Classification Match

- 7th/8th place: Lost to PR China (0-3) → 8th and last place

- Team roster

- Ana María Tostado
- Asunción Domenech
- Carmen Miranda
- Estela Domínguez
- Inmaculada González
- Inmaculada Torres
- Laura de la Torre
- María del Mar Rey
- Marta Gens
- Olga Martín
- Rita Oraá
- Virginia Cardona

- Head coach: Jaime Fernández Barros

== Water polo ==
=== Men's tournament ===
- Preliminary round (Group B)

- Spain — Netherlands 12-6
- Spain — Greece 11-6
- Spain — Hungary 8-5
- Spain — Italy 9-9
- Spain — Cuba 12-10

- Semifinals

- Spain — United States 6-4

- Final

- Spain — Italy 8-9 (→ Silver medal)

- Team roster

- Daniel Ballart
- Jesús Rollán
- Jordi Sans
- Josep Picó
- Manuel Estiarte
- Manuel Silvestre
- Marco Antonio González
- Miguel Ángel Oca
- Pedro Francisco García
- Ricardo Sánchez
- Rubén Michavila
- Salvador Gómez
- Sergi Pedrerol

== Weightlifting ==
Athlete	Event	Snatch		Clean & Jerk		Total	Rank
Athlete	Event	Result	Rank	Result	Rank	Total	Rank
José Andrés Ibáñez	−52 kg	100.0	9	122.5	8	227.5	8
José Luis Martínez	−56 kg	105.0	16	130.0	14	235.0	15
José Zurera	−56 kg	112.5	7	135.0	12	247.5	12
Cecilio Leal	−60 kg	115.0	19	140.0	21	255.0	23
Fernando Mariaca	−67.5 kg	NM	17	did not finish			
Juan Carlos	−82.5 kg	140.0	21	180.0	21	320.0	22
