= Field hockey at the 1992 Summer Olympics – Women's team squads =

List of hockey players

The following is the list of squads that took place in the women's field hockey tournament at the 1992 Summer Olympics.

== Group A ==
=== Australia ===
The following players represented Australia:

Head coach: (Australia) Brian Glencross

No.	Pos.	Player	Date of birth (age)	Caps	Club
1		Kathleen Partridge	7 December 1963 (aged 28)		
2		Christine Dobson	24 November 1966 (aged 25)		
3		Liane Tooth	13 March 1962 (aged 30)		
4		Alyson Annan	12 June 1973 (aged 19)		
5		Juliet Haslam	31 May 1969 (aged 23)		
6		Michelle Hager	3 October 1966 (aged 25)		
7		Alison Peek	12 October 1969 (aged 22)		
8		Lisa Powell	8 July 1970 (aged 22)		
9		Lisa Naughton	2 April 1963 (aged 29)		
10		Kate Starre	18 September 1971 (aged 20)		
11		Sally Carbon	14 April 1967 (aged 25)		
12		Jackie Pereira	29 October 1964 (aged 27)		
13		Tracey Belbin	24 June 1967 (aged 25)		
14		Rechelle Hawkes	30 May 1967 (aged 25)		
15		Sharon Buchanan	12 March 1963 (aged 29)		
16		Debbie Sullivan	4 July 1963 (aged 29)		

=== Canada ===
The following players represented Canada:

Head coach: (Canada) Marina van der Merwe

No.	Pos.	Player	Date of birth (age)	Caps	Club
1		Deb Whitten	5 December 1966 (aged 25)		
2		Gaye Porteous	26 June 1965 (aged 27)		
3		Deb Covey	7 September 1961 (aged 30)		
4		Rochelle Low	19 May 1969 (aged 23)		
5		Tara Croxford	7 January 1968 (aged 24)		
6		Sandra Levy	12 March 1965 (aged 27)		
7		Sue Reid	10 November 1970 (aged 21)		
8		Heather Jones	8 October 1970 (aged 21)		
9		Candy Thomson	8 March 1967 (aged 25)		
10		Bernadette Bowyer	23 January 1966 (aged 26)		
11		Michelle Conn	17 September 1963 (aged 28)		
12		Laurelee Kopeck	17 July 1969 (aged 23)		
13		Joel Brough	9 February 1968 (aged 24)		
14		Milena Gaiga	30 August 1964 (aged 27)		
15		Sherri Field	13 March 1972 (aged 20)		
16		Sharon Creelman	27 April 1964 (aged 28)		

=== Germany ===
The following players represented Germany:

Head coach: (Germany) Rüdiger Hanel

No.	Pos.	Player	Date of birth (age)	Caps	Club
1		Susie Wollschläger	5 May 1967 (aged 25)		
2		Bianca Weiß	24 January 1968 (aged 24)		
3		Tanja Dickenscheid	17 June 1969 (aged 23)		
4		Susanne Müller	12 May 1972 (aged 20)		
5		Nadine Ernsting	5 February 1974 (aged 18)		
6		Simone Thomaschinski	4 April 1970 (aged 22)		
7		Irina Kuhnt	18 January 1968 (aged 24)		
8		Anke Wild	12 October 1967 (aged 24)		
9		Franziska Hentschel	29 June 1970 (aged 22)		
10		Tina Peters	24 March 1968 (aged 24)		
11		Eva Hagenbäumer	5 January 1967 (aged 25)		
12		Britta Becker	11 May 1973 (aged 19)		
13		Caren Jungjohann	23 December 1967 (aged 24)		
14		Christine Ferneck	29 April 1968 (aged 24)		
15		Heike Lätzsch	19 December 1973 (aged 18)		
16		Katrin Kauschke	13 September 1971 (aged 20)		

=== Spain ===
The following players represented Spain:

Head coach: (Spain) José Manuel Brasa

No.	Pos.	Player	Date of birth (age)	Caps	Club
1		Mariví González	27 February 1961 (aged 31)		
2		Natalia Dorado	25 February 1967 (aged 25)		
3		Virginia Ramírez	22 May 1964 (aged 28)		
4		María Carmen Barea	5 October 1966 (aged 25)		
5		Silvia Manrique	6 March 1973 (aged 19)		
6		Nagore Gabellanes	25 January 1973 (aged 19)		
7		María Ángeles Rodríguez	12 April 1957 (aged 35)		
8		Sonia Barrio	13 December 1969 (aged 22)		
9		Celia Corres	22 January 1964 (aged 28)		
10		Elisabeth Maragall	25 November 1970 (aged 21)		
11		Teresa Motos	29 December 1963 (aged 28)		
12		Maider Tellería	14 July 1973 (aged 19)		
13		Mercedes Coghen	2 August 1962 (aged 29)		
14		Nuria Olivé	20 August 1968 (aged 23)		
15		Anna Maiques	3 September 1967 (aged 24)		
16		María Isabel Martínez	16 October 1967 (aged 24)		

== Group B ==
=== Great Britain ===
The following players represented Great Britain:

Head coach: (United Kingdom) Dennis Hay

No.	Pos.	Player	Date of birth (age)	Caps	Club
1		Joanne Thompson	13 May 1965 (aged 27)		
2		Helen Morgan	20 July 1966 (aged 26)		
3		Lisa Bayliss	27 November 1966 (aged 25)		
4		Karen Brown	9 January 1963 (aged 29)		
5		Mary Nevill	12 March 1961 (aged 31)		
6		Jill Atkins	30 May 1963 (aged 29)		
7		Vicky Dixon	5 August 1959 (aged 32)		
8		Wendy Fraser	23 April 1963 (aged 29)		
9		Sandy Lister	16 August 1961 (aged 30)		
10		Jane Sixsmith	5 September 1967 (aged 24)		
11		Alison Ramsay	16 April 1959 (aged 33)		
12		Jackie McWilliams	18 February 1964 (aged 28)		
13		Tammy Miller	21 June 1967 (aged 25)		
14		Mandy Nicholls	28 February 1968 (aged 24)		
15		Kath Johnson	21 January 1967 (aged 25)		
16		Susan Fraser	15 July 1966 (aged 26)		

=== Netherlands ===
The following players represented the Netherlands:

Head coach: (Netherlands) Roelant Oltmans

No.	Pos.	Player	Date of birth (age)	Caps	Club
1		Jacqueline Toxopeus	11 December 1964 (aged 27)		
2		Carina Bleeker	22 September 1968 (aged 23)		
3		Caroline van Nieuwenhuyze-Leenders	12 September 1967 (aged 24)		
4		Annemieke Fokke	4 November 1967 (aged 24)		
5		Cécile Vinke	31 August 1973 (aged 18)		
6		Jeannette Lewin	27 February 1972 (aged 20)		
7		Carina Benninga	18 August 1962 (aged 29)		
8		Danielle Koenen	20 July 1968 (aged 24)		
9		Ingrid Wolff	17 February 1964 (aged 28)		
10		Mieketine Wouters	10 March 1969 (aged 23)		
11		Martine Ohr	11 June 1964 (aged 28)		
12		Florentine Steenberghe	11 November 1967 (aged 24)		
13		Noor Holsboer	12 July 1967 (aged 25)		
14		Helen Lejeune-van der Ben	25 July 1964 (aged 28)		
15		Wietske de Ruiter	20 March 1970 (aged 22)		
16		Carole Thate	6 December 1971 (aged 20)		

=== New Zealand ===
The following players represented New Zealand:

Head coach: (New Zealand) Patricia Barwick

No.	Pos.	Player	Date of birth (age)	Caps	Club
1		Elaine Jensen	18 March 1955 (aged 37)		
2		Helen Shearer	16 April 1971 (aged 21)		
3		Mary Clinton	8 March 1960 (aged 32)		
4		Tina Bell	30 June 1967 (aged 25)		
5		Christine Arthur	26 August 1963 (aged 28)		
6		Shane Collins	25 July 1963 (aged 29)		
7		Sapphire Cooper	11 March 1968 (aged 24)		
8		Kylie Foy	30 December 1971 (aged 20)		
9		Sue Duggan	31 October 1963 (aged 28)		
10		Susan Furmage	27 February 1963 (aged 29)		
11		Trudy Kilkolly	4 October 1965 (aged 26)		
12		Anna Lawrence	9 March 1972 (aged 20)		
13		Kieren O'Grady	12 December 1963 (aged 28)		
14		Mandy Smith	14 May 1972 (aged 20)		
15		Robyn Toomey	6 March 1964 (aged 28)		
16		Kate Trolove	4 August 1967 (aged 24)		

=== South Korea ===
The following players represented South Korea:

Head coach: (South Korea) Kim Chang-back

No.	Pos.	Player	Date of birth (age)	Caps	Club
1		You Jae-sook	15 March 1968 (aged 24)		
2		Han Gum-shil	24 January 1968 (aged 24)		
3		Chang Eun-jung	18 August 1970 (aged 21)		
4		Lee Seon-yeong	15 February 1970 (aged 22)		
5		Lee Gwi-ju	12 November 1972 (aged 19)		
6		Son Jeong-im	12 December 1968 (aged 23)		
7		No Yeong-mi	17 February 1968 (aged 24)		
8		Kim Gyeong-ae	11 August 1970 (aged 21)		
9		Lee Eun-kyung	10 November 1972 (aged 19)		
10		Jang Dong-suk	13 December 1970 (aged 21)		
11		Kwon Chang-sook	4 May 1971 (aged 21)		
12		Yang Hye-suk	18 January 1966 (aged 26)		
13		Lee Gyeong-hui	17 June 1970 (aged 22)		
14		Gu Mun-yeong	1 February 1971 (aged 21)		
15		Lim Kye-sook	3 October 1964 (aged 27)		
16		Jin Deok-san	12 December 1972 (aged 19)		
