= List of Spanish sportspeople =

This is a partial list of Spanish sportspeople. For the full plain list of Spanish sportspeople on Wikipedia, see Category:Spanish sportspeople.

== Alpine skiing ==
- Blanca Fernández Ochoa
- Francisco Fernández Ochoa
- María José Rienda
- Carolina Ruiz Castillo

== Archery ==
- Juan Holgado
- Antonio Vázquez

== Athletics ==
- José Manuel Abascal
- Abel Antón
- Ruth Beitia
- Fermín Cacho
- Marta Domínguez
- Reyes Estévez
- Paquillo Fernández
- Martín Fiz
- Jesús Ángel García
- Javier García
- José Luis González
- Encarna Granados
- Yago Lamela
- Joan Lino Martínez
- Jorge Llopart
- Miguel Ángel López
- José Marín
- Eliseo Martín
- Manuel Martínez Gutiérrez
- Mayte Martínez
- Valentí Massana
- Juan Manuel Molina
- Niurka Montalvo
- Sandra Myers
- Antonio Peñalver
- Daniel Plaza
- Julio Rey
- Natalia Rodríguez
- María Vasco

== Badminton ==
- Pablo Abián
- Carolina Marín

== Basketball ==
- Fernando Arcega
- José Manuel Beirán
- José Calderón
- Víctor Claver
- Juan Antonio Corbalán
- Rudy Fernández
- Marc Gasol
- Pau Gasol
- Serge Ibaka
- Andrés Jiménez Fernández
- José Luis Llorente
- Sergio Llull
- Juan Manuel López Iturriaga
- Josep Maria Margall
- Fernando Martín Espina
- Juan Carlos Navarro
- Felipe Reyes
- Sergio Rodríguez
- Fernando Romay
- Víctor Sada
- Fernando San Emeterio
- Juan Antonio San Epifanio
- Ignacio Solozábal

== Beach volleyball ==
- Elsa Baquerizo
- Javier Bosma
- Fabio Díez
- Liliana Fernández
- Adrián Gavira
- Pablo Herrera
- Raúl Mesa

== Biathlon ==
- Victoria Padial

== Bobsleigh ==
- Luis Nunoz
- Alfonso de Portago

== Boxing ==
- Rafael Lozano
- Faustino Reyes
- Enrique Rodríguez

== Canoeing ==
- David Cal
- Maialen Chourraut
- Saúl Craviotto
- Guillermo del Riego
- José María Esteban
- José Ramón López
- Herminio Menéndez
- Enrique Míguez
- Carlos Pérez
- Luis Gregorio Ramos
- Narcisco Suárez

== Cross-country skiing ==
- Laura Orgué

== Cycling ==
- Carlos Castaño Panadero
- Sergi Escobar
- José Antonio Escuredo
- Margarita Fullana
- José Antonio Hermida
- Miguel Indurain
- Joan Llaneras
- Asier Maeztu
- José Manuel Moreno
- Leire Olaberria
- Abraham Olano
- Samuel Sánchez
- Toni Tauler
- Carlos Torrent

== Equestrian ==
- José Álvarez de Bohórquez
- Beatriz Ferrer-Salat
- Jaime García
- Julio García Fernández de los Ríos
- Marcellino Gavilán
- Juan Antonio Jimenez
- José Navarro Morenés
- Ignacio Rambla
- Rafael Soto

== Fencing ==
- José Luis Abajo

== Field hockey ==
=== Male players ===
- Jaume Amat
- Juan Amat
- Pedro Amat
- Pol Amat
- Juan Arbós
- Jaime Arbós
- Javier Arnau
- Jordi Arnau
- Óscar Barrena
- Francisco Caballer
- Javier Cabot
- Ricardo Cabot
- Juan Calzado
- Miguel Chaves
- Ignacio Cobos
- Juan Coghen
- José Colomer
- Miguel de Paz
- Carlos del Coso
- José Dinarés
- Juan Dinarés
- Eduardo Dualde
- Joaquín Dualde
- Rafael Egusquiza
- Juan Escarré
- Xavier Escudé
- Francisco Fábregas
- Juantxo García-Mauriño
- José García
- Rafael Garralda
- Antonio González
- Ramón Jufresa
- Ignacio Macaya
- Joaquim Malgosa
- Santiago Malgosa
- Paulino Monsalve
- Pedro Murúa
- Juan Pellón
- Victor Pujol
- Carlos Roca
- Pedro Roig
- Ramón Sala
- Luis Usoz
- Pablo Usoz
- Narcís Ventalló
- Jaime Zumalacárregui

=== Female players ===
- María Ángeles Rodríguez
- María Carmen Barea
- Ruby da Cherry
- Mercedes Coghen
- Celia Corres
- Natalia Dorado
- Nagore Gabellanes
- Mariví González
- Anna Maiques
- Silvia Manrique
- Elisabeth Maragall
- María Isabel Martínez
- Teresa Motos
- Nuria Olivé
- Virginia Ramírez
- Maider Tellería

== Figure skating ==
- Javier Fernández

== Football ==
- Paulino Alcántara
- Raúl Albiol
- Álvaro Arbeloa
- Sergio Busquets
- Joan Capdevila
- Iker Casillas
- Cesc Fàbregas
- Andrés Iniesta
- Fernando Llorente
- Juan Mata
- Javi Martínez
- Jesús Navas
- Pedro
- Gerard Piqué
- Carles Puyol
- Sergio Ramos
- Pepe Reina
- David Silva
- Rogelio Tapia
- Fernando Torres
- Víctor Valdés
- David Villa
- Xabi Alonso
- Xavi
- Nico Williams

== Golf ==
- Seve Ballesteros
- Sergio García
- Azahara Muñoz

== Gymnastics ==
- Marta Baldó
- Nuria Cabanillas
- Gervasio Deferr
- Estela Giménez
- Lorena Guréndez
- Tania Lamarca
- Estíbaliz Martínez
- Patricia Moreno
- Carolina Pascual

== Handball ==
=== Male players ===
- David Barrufet
- Jon Belaustegui
- David Davis
- Talant Duyshebaev
- Alberto Entrerríos
- Raúl Entrerríos
- Salvador Esquer
- Aitor Etxaburu
- Jesús Fernández
- Jaume Fort
- Rubén Garabaya
- Juanín García
- Mateo Garralda
- Raúl González
- Rafael Guijosa
- Fernando Hernández
- José Javier Hombrados
- Demetrio Lozano
- Cristian Malmagro
- Enric Masip
- Jordi Nuñez
- Xavier O'Callaghan
- Jesús Olalla
- Antonio Carlos Ortega
- Juan Pérez
- Carlos Prieto
- Albert Rocas
- Iker Romero
- Víctor Tomás
- Antonio Ugalde
- Iñaki Urdangarin
- Alberto Urdiales
- Andrei Xepkin

=== Female players ===
- Macarena Aguilar
- Nely Carla Alberto
- Jessica Alonso Bernardo
- Vanesa Amorós
- Andrea Barnó
- Elisabeth Chávez
- Mihaela Ciobanu
- Verónica Cuadrado
- Patricia Elorza
- Uxue Ezkurdia
- Beatriz Fernández
- Begoña Fernández
- Marta Mangué
- Carmen Martín
- Silvia Navarro
- Elisabeth Pinedo
- Maite Zugarrondo

== Judo ==
- Miriam Blasco
- Isabel Fernández
- Almudena Muñoz
- Ernesto Pérez
- Yolanda Soler

== Rowing ==
- Fernando Climent
- Luis María Lasúrtegui

== Sailing ==
- Alejandro Abascal
- Marina Alabau
- Santiago Amat
- Sandra Azón
- José Luis Ballester
- Jordi Calafat
- José Doreste
- Luis Doreste
- Fernando Echavarri
- Támara Echegoyen
- Xabier Fernández
- Antonio Gorostegui
- Patricia Guerra
- Fernando Leon
- Domingo Manrique
- Iker Martínez
- Pedro Millet
- Roberto Molina
- Miguel Noguer
- Antón Paz Blanco
- Ángela Pumariega
- Kiko Sánchez
- Sofía Toro
- Rafael Trujillo
- José van der Ploeg
- Begoña Vía-Dufresne
- Natalia Vía Dufresne
- Theresa Zabell

== Snowboarding ==
- Queralt Castellet
- Lucas Eguibar
- Regino Hernández

== Shooting ==
- Jorge Guardiola
- María Quintanal

== Swimming ==
- Mireia Belmonte
- Sergio López Miró
- David López-Zubero
- Martin López-Zubero
- Nina Zhivanevskaya

== Synchronized swimming ==
- Clara Basiana
- Alba María Cabello
- Ona Carbonell
- Margalida Crespí
- Andrea Fuentes
- Thaïs Henríquez
- Paula Klamburg
- Gemma Mengual
- Irene Montrucchio
- Laia Pons

== Table tennis ==
- Galia Dvorak
- Carlos Machado
- Sara Ramírez
- Shen Yanfei
- He Zhi Wen

== Taekwondo ==
- Gabriel Esparza
- Nicolás García
- Joel González
- Brigitte Yagüe

== Tennis ==
- Jordi Arrese
- Carlos Alcaraz
- Sergi Bruguera
- Sergio Casal
- Àlex Corretja
- Albert Costa
- Juan Carlos Ferrero
- Andrés Gimeno
- Conchita Martínez
- Anabel Medina Garrigues
- Carlos Moyá
- Garbiñe Muguruza
- Rafael Nadal
- Manuel Orantes
- Virginia Ruano Pascual
- Arantxa Sánchez Vicario
- Emilio Sánchez
- Manuel Santana

== Triathlon ==
- Virginia Berasategui
- Francisco Javier Gómez Noya
- Eneko Llanos
- Mario Mola
- Iván Raña

== Volleyball ==
- Enrique de la Fuente
- Guillermo Falasca
- Miguel Ángel Falasca
- José Luis Moltó
- Rafael Pascual
- Ibán Pérez
- Manuel Sevillano

== Water polo ==
=== Male players ===
- Josep Maria Abarca
- Ángel Andreo
- Daniel Ballart
- Manuel Estiarte
- Pedro Francisco García
- Salvador Gómez
- Marco Antonio González
- Rubén Michavila
- Iván Moro
- Miguel Ángel Oca
- Jorge Payá
- Sergi Pedrerol
- Josep Picó
- Jesús Rollán
- Ricardo Sánchez
- Carles Sans
- Jordi Sans
- Manuel Silvestre

=== Female players ===
- Marta Bach
- Andrea Blas
- Ana Copado
- Anni Espar
- Laura Ester
- Maica García Godoy
- Laura López
- Ona Meseguer
- Lorena Miranda
- Matilde Ortiz
- Jennifer Pareja
- Pilar Peña Carrasco
- Roser Tarragó

== Weightlifting ==
- Lydia Valentín

== Wheelchair basketball ==
- Manuel Berzal Burgos

== Wrestling ==
- Maider Unda

== See also ==
- Spain at the Olympics
- Sport in Spain

Mixed martial arts Ilia Topuria Joel Alvarez Chris Barnett
