= 1993 Women's Hockey Champions Trophy =

Field hockey tournament

Tournament details
- Host country: Netherlands
- City: Amstelveen
- Teams: 6
- Venue: Wagener Stadium

Final positions
- Champions: Australia (2nd title)
- Runner-up: Netherlands
- Third place: Germany

Tournament statistics
- Matches played: 18
- Goals scored: 53 (2.94 per match)
- Top scorer(s): (Australia) Lisa Powell (Germany) Franziska Hentschel (South Korea) Jang Dong-Sook (4 goals)

The 1993 Women's Hockey Champions Trophy was the 4th edition of the Hockey Champions Trophy for women, a field hockey tournament held every four years. It was held between 22 and 29 August 1993 in Amstelveen, Netherlands.

Australia won the tournament for the second consecutive time after defeating the Netherlands 4–2 in the final on penalty strokes after a 1–1 draw.

== Squads ==
Australia
- Head coach: Ric Charlesworth
1. Justine Sowry (GK)
2. Tammy Ghisalberti
3. Liane Tooth
4. Alyson Annan
5. Juliet Haslam
6. Jenn Morris
7. Alison Peek
8. Lisa Powell
9. Karen Marsden (GK)
10. Kate Starre
11. Sally Carbon
12. Jackie Pereira
13. Nova Peris-Kneebone
14. Rechelle Hawkes (c)
15. Sharon Buchanan
16. Michelle Andrews
Germany
- Head coach: Rüdiger Hanel
1. Bianca Weiß (GK)
2. Birgit Beyer (GK)
3. Ilhelm Merabet
4. Susanne Müller
5. Nadine Ernsting-Krienke
6. Simone Thomaschinski
7. Irina Kuhnt
8. Melanie Cremer
9. Franziska Hentschel (c)
10. Inga Möller
11. Eva Hagenbäumer
12. Britta Becker
13. Julia Backhaus
14. Philippa Suxdorf
15. Heike Lätzsch
16. Katrin Kauschke
Great Britain
- Head coach: Sue Slocombe
1. Tracey Robb (GK)
2. Hilary Rose (GK)
3. Mandy Davies
4. Jane Smith
5. Lucy Youngs
6. Jill Atkins (c)
7. Watkin Lynda
8. Samantha Wright
9. Sally Gibson
10. Alison Swindlehurst
11. Christine Cook
12. Pauline Robertson
13. Gill Messenger
14. Susan Fraser
15. Kathryn Johnson
16. Susan MacDonald
Netherlands
- Head coach: Bert Wentink
1. Carina Bleeker (GK)
2. Daphne Touw (GK)
3. Machteld Derks
4. Willemijn Duyster
5. Ingeborg Evenblij
6. Jeannette Lewin
7. Hanneke Smabers
8. Harriët Dijsselhof-Groten
9. Liesbeth van Gent
10. Mieketine Wouters
11. Ingrid Appels
12. Wendy Fortuin
13. Noor Holsboer (c)
14. Cécile Vinke
15. Frederiek Grijpma
16. Suzan van der Wielen
South Korea
- Head coach: Kim Chang-back
1. You Jae-sook (GK)
2. Lee Soon-mi
3. Cho Eun-jung
4. Ro Min-ha
5. Lee Seon-young
6. Kim Myung-ok
7. Lee Eun-young
8. Lee Ji-young
9. Choi Eun-kyung
10. Jang Dong-sook
11. Ro Young-mi (c)
12. Kwon Soon-hyun
13. Shin Yoo-ri
14. Lee Kui-joo
15. Kwon Chang-sook
16. Jin Deok-san (GK)
Spain
- Head coach: José Brasa
1. Elena Carrión (GK)
2. Erdoitza Goichoechea
3. Virginia Ramírez (c)
4. María Carmen Barea
5. Ivet Imbers
6. Elixabete Yarza
7. María Ángeles Rodríguez
8. Sonia Barrio
9. María Cruz González
10. Rosario Teva
11. Carmen Martín
12. Felisa Melero
13. Begoña Larzabal
14. Fatima Lasso
15. Sonia de Ignacio-Simo
16. María Isabel Martínez (GK)

== Results ==
=== Pool ===
Pos	Team	Pld	W	D	L	GF	GA	GD	Pts	Qualification
1	Australia	5	5	0	0	17	2	+15	10	Final
2	Netherlands	5	3	1	1	8	2	+6	7	Final
3	South Korea	5	2	2	1	11	6	+5	6	3rd Place
4	Germany	5	1	2	2	6	5	+1	4	3rd Place
5	Great Britain	5	1	1	3	5	10	−5	3	
6	Spain	5	0	0	5	1	23	−22	0	

Source: FIH
Rules for classification: 1) points; 2) goal difference; 3) goals scored; 4) head-to-head result.

22 August 1993
12:00

Australia	2–0	Great Britain
Andrews 35+'; Powell 63'	Report

Umpires:
Lee Mi-ok (KOR)
Laura Crespo (ARG)

22 August 1993
14:00

Netherlands	3–0	Spain
Smabers 6'; Wouters 13', 60'	Report

Umpires:
Peri Buckley (AUS)
Gina Spitaleri (ITA)

22 August 1993
16:00

South Korea	1–1	Germany
Jang 58'	Report	Cremer 14'

Umpires:
Edna Rutten (NED)
Angela Lario (ESP)

23 August 1993
15:00

South Korea	3–1	Great Britain
Lee J. 13'; Ro Y. 32'; Lee K. 46'	Report	Gibson 54'

Umpires:
Peri Buckley (AUS)
Edna Rutten (NED)

23 August 1993
17:00

Spain	1–8	Australia
Imbers 66'	Report	Andrews 10'; Buchanan 24'; Hawkes 30'; Pereira 33'; Annan 41'; Haslam 56'; Powell 69', 70'

Umpires:
Lee Mi-ok (KOR)
Miriam van Gemert (NED)

23 August 1993
19:00

Germany	0–1	Netherlands
	Report	Vinke 48'

Umpires:
Gill Clarke (GBR)
Laura Crespo (ARG)

25 August 1993
15:00

Great Britain	2–0	Spain
Smith 50'; Gibson 65'	Report

Umpires:
Hu Yufang (CHN)
Peri Buckley (AUS)

25 August 1993
17:00

Australia	1–0	Germany
Pereira 30'	Report

Umpires:
Gill Clarke (GBR)
Miriam van Gemert (NED)

25 August 1993
19:00

Netherlands	0–0	South Korea
	Report

Umpires:
Angela Lario (ESP)
Gina Spitaleri (ITA)

26 August 1993
15:00

Spain	0–3	Germany
	Report	Hentschel 10', 31', 46'

Umpires:
Laura Crespo (ARG)
Edna Rutten (NED)

26 August 1993
17:00

Australia	4–0	South Korea
Annan 15'; Powell 35'; Carbon 40'; Haslam 70'	Report

Umpires:
Angela Lario (ESP)
Miriam van Gemert (NED)

26 August 1993
19:00

Great Britain	0–3	Netherlands
	Report	Van der Wielen 10'; Smabers 51'; Grijpma 66'

Umpires:
Peri Buckley (AUS)
Lee Mi-ok (KOR)

28 August 1993
10:00

Spain	0–7	South Korea
	Report	Choi 12'; Jang 19', 66', 69'; Ro Y. 21', 25'; Cho 37'

28 August 1993
12:00

Germany	2–2	Great Britain
Becker 26'; Kuhnt 68'	Report	Gibson 30'; MacDonald 44'

28 August 1993
14:00

Netherlands	1–2	Australia
Smabers 24'	Report	Carbon 6'; Andrews 38'

=== Classification ===
==== Fifth and sixth place ====
29 August 1993
10:00

Great Britain	0–1	Spain
	Report	De Ignacio-Simo 49'

Umpires:
Peri Buckley (AUS)
Laura Crespo (ARG)

==== Third and fourth place ====
29 August 1993
12:00

South Korea	0–2	Germany
	Report	Hentschel 14'; Lätzsch 60'

Umpires:
Gill Clarke (GBR)
Miriam van Gemert (NED)

==== Final ====
29 August 1993
14:00

Australia	1–1	Netherlands
Annan 16'	Report	Vinke 41'
Penalties
Andrews (penalty shoot-out scored); Morris (penalty shoot-out scored); Starre (penalty shoot-out scored); Annan (penalty shoot-out scored)	4−2	(penalty shoot-out missed) Derks; (penalty shoot-out scored) Dijsselhof-Groten; (penalty shoot-out scored) Appels; (penalty shoot-out missed) Smabers

Umpires:
Lee Mi-ok (KOR)
Gina Spitaleri (ITA)

== Statistics ==
=== Final standings ===
1. Australia
2. Netherlands
3. Germany
4. South Korea
5. Spain
6. Great Britain

=== Goalscorers ===
There were 53 goals scored in 18 matches, for an average of 2.94 goals per match.

4 goals

- (Australia) Lisa Powell
- (Germany) Franziska Hentschel
- (South Korea) Jang Dong-Sook

3 goals

- (Australia) Michelle Andrews
- (Australia) Alyson Annan
- (United Kingdom) Sally Gibson
- (Netherlands) Hanneke Smabers
- (South Korea) Ro Young-Mi

2 goals

- (Australia) Sally Carbon
- (Australia) Juliet Haslam
- (Australia) Jacqui Pereira
- (Netherlands) Mieketine Wouters
- (Netherlands) Cécile Vinke

1 goal

- (Australia) Sharon Buchanan
- (Australia) Rechelle Hawkes
- (Germany) Britta Becker
- (Germany) Melanie Cremer
- (Germany) Irina Kuhnt
- (Germany) Heike Lätzsch
- (United Kingdom) Sue MacDonald
- (United Kingdom) Jane Smith
- (Netherlands) Frederiek Grijpma
- (Netherlands) Suzan van der Wielen
- (South Korea) Cho Eun-Jung
- (South Korea) Choi Eun-Kyung
- (South Korea) Lee Ji-Young
- (South Korea) Lee Kui-Joo
- (Spain) Sonia de Ignacio-Simo
- (Spain) Ivet Imbers

Source: FIH
