= Uxue =

Uxue may refer to:

== People ==
- Uxue Barkos, Basque politician and journalist from Navarre
- Uxue Ezkurdia, Basque handballer
- Uxue Amaya Guereca Parra, Mexican volleyball player
- Uxue Iparragirre, Basque footballer

== Place ==
- Uxue/Ujué, town and municipality of Navarre

== Other ==
- Uxúe Bilbao, a former name for Spanish professional basketball club Bilbao Basket
