= Lee Kyung-hee (disambiguation) =

Lee Kyung-hee (also transcribed as Lee/Li/Ri Gyeong-hui / Gyong-hui) is the name of:

- Ko Eun-ah (actress, born 1946) (born Lee Kyung-hee), South Korean actress
- Lee Gyeong-hui (born 1958), South Korean female speed skater
- Ri Kyong-hui (born 1967), North Korean female cross-country skier
- Lee Kyung-hee (born 1969), South Korean female television screenwriter
- Lee Gyeong-hui (born 1970), South Korean female field hockey player
- Li Gyong-hui (born 1972), North Korean female rhythmic gymnast
- Lee Kyung-hee (footballer) (born 1978), South Korean female footballer
- Grace Lee (born Lee Kyung-hee 1982), South Korean female television host
