= Spain national field hockey team =

Spain national field hockey team may refer to:

- Spain men's national field hockey team
- Spain women's national field hockey team
