= Mancebo =

Mancebo is a surname of Spanish origin. Notable people with the surname include:

- Eleuterio Mancebo (born 1968), Spanish cyclist
- Francisco Mancebo (born 1976), Spanish cyclist
