= Alfonso Menéndez =

Spanish archer (born 1966)

Medal record

Representing Spain

Men's archery

Olympic Games
Gold medal – first place	1992 Barcelona	Team

Alfonso Menéndez Vallín (born 31 May 1966 in Avilés, Asturias) is a Spanish archer and Olympic champion. He competed at the 1992 Summer Olympics in Barcelona, where he won a gold medal with the Spanish archery team, together with teammates Antonio Vázquez and Juan Holgado.
