= Gu Mun-yeong =

South Korean hockey player

Personal information
- Nationality: South Korean
- Born: 1 February 1971 (age 55)

Sport
- Sport: Field hockey

Gu Mun-yeong (born 1 February 1971) is a South Korean field hockey player. She competed in the women's tournament at the 1992 Summer Olympics.
