= Archery at the 1992 Summer Olympics =

Archery at the Games of the XXV Olympiad
- Venue: Camp Olímpic de Tir amb Arc
- Dates: 31 July – 4 August 1992
- No. of events: 4 (2 men, 2 women)
- Competitors: 136 from 44 nations

There were four different archery competitions at the 1992 Summer Olympics. The format of the previous Olympics was dropped for this Olympiad, with an entirely new system being put in place.

For the first time, all archery was done at a single distance, 70 metres. All archers took place in the ranking round, in which they shot 144 arrows. These scores were used to determine both individual and team ranks. The top 32 individual archers in each division (men's and women's) were seeded into a single-elimination tournament called the "Olympic round". Nations that sent the maximum number of three archers in either or both division also had the chance for those three archers to compete as a team; the top 16 teams in each division were also seeded into single-elimination tournaments.

Winners of the semifinal in each of the four competitions faced each other for the gold and silver medals, while the semifinal losers faced off for the bronze medal and fourth place. All other rankings were determined by the score of the archer or team in the round they were defeated. That is, fifth through eighth place were determined by the quarterfinal scores of the four archers defeated in the quarterfinals.

== Medal summary ==
=== Events ===
| Event | Gold | Silver | Bronze |
|---|---|---|---|
| Men's individual | Sébastien Flute; France | Chung Jae-hun; South Korea | Simon Terry; Great Britain |
| Men's team | Spain; Juan Holgado; Alfonso Menéndez; Antonio Vázquez | Finland; Ismo Falck; Jari Lipponen; Tomi Poikolainen | Great Britain; Steven Hallard; Richard Priestman; Simon Terry |
| Women's individual | Cho Youn-jeong; South Korea | Kim Soo-nyung; South Korea | Natalia Valeeva; Unified Team (Moldova) |
| Women's team | South Korea; Cho Youn-jeong; Kim Soo-nyung; Lee Eun-kyung | China; Ma Xiangjun; Wang Hong; Wang Xiaozhu | Unified Team; Lyudmila Arzhanikova; Khatouna Kvrivichvili; Natalia Valeeva |

=== Medal table ===
* Host nation (Spain)

| Rank | Nation | Gold | Silver | Bronze | Total |
|---|---|---|---|---|---|
| 1 | South Korea | 2 | 2 | 0 | 4 |
| 2 | France | 1 | 0 | 0 | 1 |
| 2 | Spain* | 1 | 0 | 0 | 1 |
| 4 | China | 0 | 1 | 0 | 1 |
| 4 | Finland | 0 | 1 | 0 | 1 |
| 6 | Great Britain | 0 | 0 | 2 | 2 |
| 6 | Unified Team | 0 | 0 | 2 | 2 |
| Totals (7 entries) | | 4 | 4 | 4 | 12 |

== Participating nations ==
A total of 44 nations competed in this sport.

- Australia (3)
- Belgium (1)
- Bhutan (6)
- Brazil (2)
- Bulgaria (1)
- Canada (3)
- China (6)
- Colombia (1)
- Costa Rica (1)
- Cyprus (1)
- Czechoslovakia (1)
- Denmark (3)
- Estonia (1)
- Finland (3)
- France (6)
- Great Britain (6)
- Germany (6)
- Guam (1)
- Hong Kong (1)
- Hungary (3)
- India (3)
- Indonesia (4)
- Ireland (1)
- Italy (4)
- Japan (6)
- Luxembourg (1)
- Mexico (4)
- Mongolia (1)
- Netherlands (6)
- New Zealand (1)
- Norway (1)
- North Korea (3)
- Poland (6)
- Portugal (1)
- San Marino (1)
- Slovenia (1)
- Spain (4)
- South Africa (2)
- South Korea (6)
- Sweden (3)
- Chinese Taipei (3)
- Turkey (6)
- Unified Team (6)
- United States (6)
