= Christine Dobson =

Australian field hockey player

Christine Helen Dobson (born 24 November 1966) is an Australian former field hockey player who competed in the 1992 Summer Olympics.
