= Mieketine Wouters =

Dutch hockey player

Personal information
- Nationality: Dutch
- Born: 10 March 1969 (age 57) Tilburg, Netherlands

Sport
- Sport: Field hockey

Mieketine Wouters (born 10 March 1969) is a Dutch field hockey player. She competed in the women's tournament at the 1992 Summer Olympics.
