= Maite Zugarrondo =

Spanish handball player (born 1989)

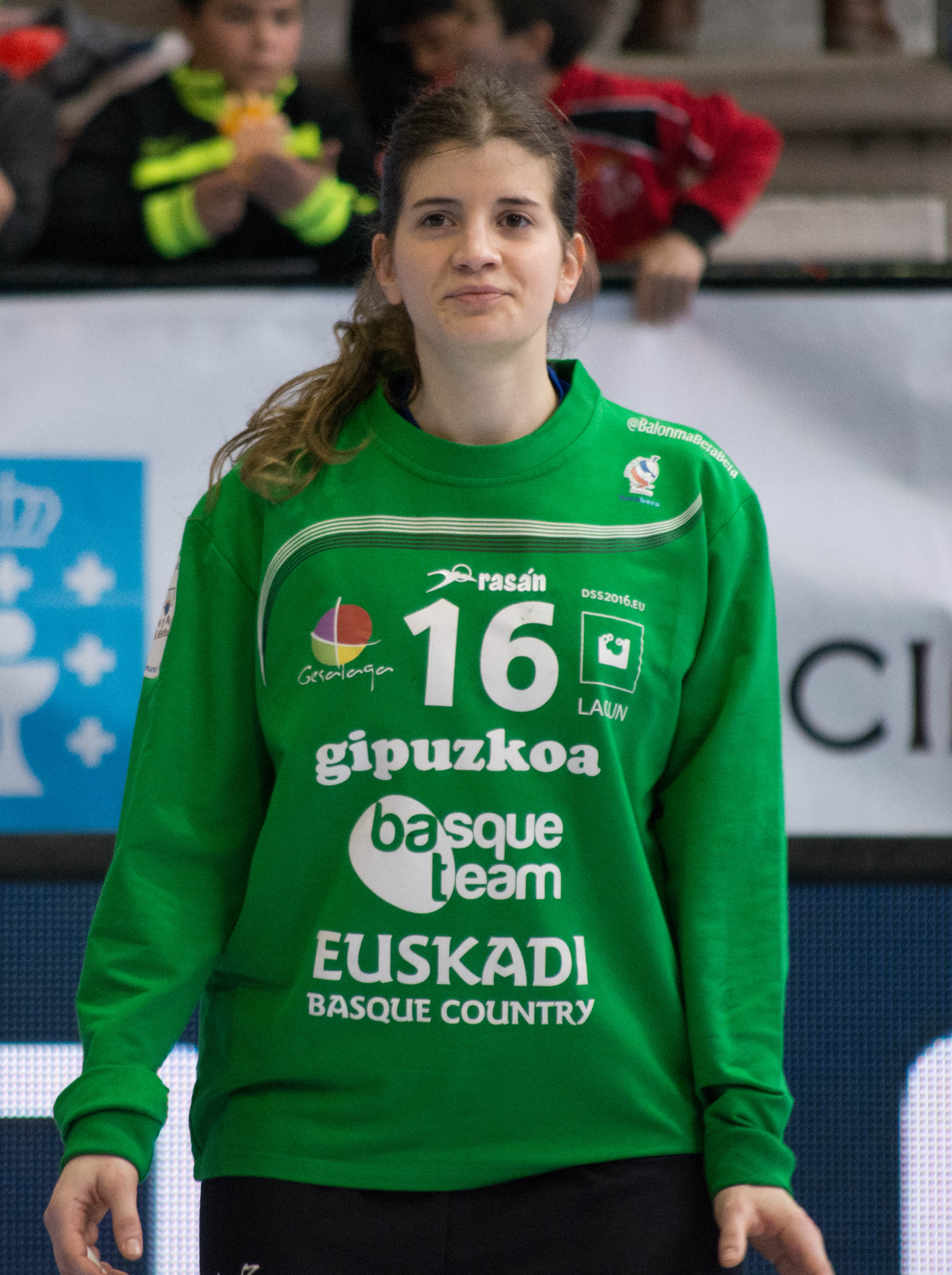

Personal information
- Full name: Maite Zugarrondo Etxeberria
- Nationality: Spanish
- Born: 4 May 1989 (age 37) Pamplona, Spain

Sport
- Sport: Handball
- Position: Goalkeeper
- Current club: BM Bera Bera
- Number: 16

Senior clubs
- Years: Team
- 2008–2011: SD Itxako
- 2011–2014: BM Alcobendas
- 2014–: BM Bera Bera
National team
Years	Team	Apps
2016–	Spain	2

Maite Zugarrondo Etxeberria (born 4 May 1989) is a Spanish former handballer.

She played for Super Amara Bera Bera and the Spanish national team. At the beginning of the 2017/2018 season she developed pericarditis. Zugarrondo retired in 2019 to raise her two nieces.

== Achievements ==
- Spanish League:
  - Winner: 2008/09, 2009/10, 2010/11, 2014/15, 2015/16, 2017/18
- Copa de la Reina de Balonmano:
  - Winner: 2010, 2011, 2012, 2016
  - Runner-up: 2015, 2017, 2018
