= Kieren O'Grady =

New Zealand field hockey player

Kieren Linda O’Grady (born 12 December 1963 in Ashburton, New Zealand) is a former field hockey player from New Zealand, who finished in eighth position with the National Women's Field Hockey Team, nicknamed The Black Sticks, at the 1992 Summer Olympics in Barcelona.
