= Cécile Vinke =

Dutch field hockey player

Personal information
- Nationality: Dutch
- Born: 31 August 1973 (age 52) Breda, Netherlands

Sport
- Sport: Field hockey

Cécile Vinke (born 31 August 1973) is a Dutch field hockey player. She competed in the women's tournament at the 1992 Summer Olympics.
