= Benjamín Vicedo =

Spanish volleyball player (born 1964)

Personal information
- Nationality: Spanish
- Born: January 25, 1964 (age 62); Madrid, Spain

Benjamín Vicedo (born 25 January 1964) is a Spanish former volleyball player who competed in the 1992 Summer Olympics.
