= Carina Bleeker =

Dutch field hockey player

Personal information
- Nationality: Dutch
- Born: 22 September 1968 (age 57) Groningen, Netherlands

Sport
- Sport: Field hockey

Carina Bleeker (born 22 September 1968) is a Dutch field hockey player. She competed in the women's tournament at the 1992 Summer Olympics.
