= Roberto Casares =

Spanish table tennis player

Personal information
- Nationality: Spanish
- Born: 14 July 1964 (age 60)

Sport
- Sport: Table tennis

Roberto Casares (born 14 July 1964) is a Spanish table tennis player. He competed in the men's singles event at the 1992 Summer Olympics.
