= Ana María Godes =

Spanish table tennis player

Personal information
- Nationality: Spanish
- Born: 11 July 1968 (age 56); Barcelona, Spain

Sport
- Sport: Table tennis

Ana María Godes (born 11 July 1968) is a Spanish table tennis player. She competed in the women's singles event at the 1992 Summer Olympics.

She retired at the age of twenty-four. Upon her retirement, he has directed the table tennis school of CT Barcino and has been a member of the board of directors of the Spanish Federation of Table Tennis.
