= Olga Martín =

Spanish volleyball player (born 1972)

Personal information
- Full name: Olga Martín Rubio
- Nationality: Spanish
- Born: 26 September 1972 (age 54); Madrid, Spain

Olga Martín (born 26 September 1972) is a Spanish former volleyball player who competed in the 1992 Summer Olympics.
