= Cristina Fraguas =

Spanish gymnast

Personal information
- Nationality: Spanish
- Born: 8 July 1976 (age 48); Madrid, Spain

Sport
- Sport: Gymnastics

Cristina Fraguas (born 8 July 1976) is a Spanish gymnast. She competed in six events at the 1992 Summer Olympics.
