= Mandy Davies =

British field hockey player

For the figure in the Profumo political scandal, see Mandy Rice-Davies.

Mandy Davies (born 29 September 1966) is a British former field hockey player who competed in the 1996 Summer Olympics.
