= Miguel Ángel Maroto =

Spanish volleyball player (born 1963)

Personal information
- Nationality: Spanish
- Born: November 8, 1963 (age 62); Madrid, Spain

Miguel Ángel Maroto (born 8 November 1963) is a Spanish former volleyball player who competed in the 1992 Summer Olympics.
