= Juan Holgado =

Spanish archer (born 1968)

Medal record

Representing Spain

Men's archery

Olympic Games
Gold medal – first place	1992 Barcelona	Team

Juan Carlos Holgado (born 16 April 1968) is a Spanish archer and Olympic champion. He competed at the 1992 Summer Olympics in Barcelona, where he won a gold medal with the Spanish archery team, together with teammates Antonio Vázquez and Alfonso Menéndez.
