= José María Pales =

Spanish table tennis player

Personal information
- Nationality: Spanish
- Born: 16 July 1963 (age 61); Barcelona, Spain

Sport
- Sport: Table tennis

José María Pales (born 16 July 1963) is a Spanish table tennis player. He competed in the men's singles event at the 1992 Summer Olympics.
