= Gabriel Vidal =

Spanish footballer

Personal information
- Full name: Gabriel Vidal Nova
- Date of birth: 5 October 1969 (age 57)
- Place of birth: Palma, Spain
- Height: 1.71 m (5 ft 7 1/2 in)
- Position: Midfielder

Youth career
- CIDE

Senior career*
Years	Team	Apps	(Gls)
1988–1989	Mallorca B	4	(2)
1989–1998	Mallorca	183	(7)
1996–1998	→ Leganés (loan)	43	(1)
1998–2001	Getafe	102	(13)
2001–2002	Ciudad Murcia	35	(1)
2002–2003	Granada	0	(0)
2003–2004	Atlético Baleares		
Total		367	(24)

International career
1985–1986	Spain U16	7	(1)
1987	Spain U17	1	(0)
1990	Spain U20	1	(1)
1992	Spain U23	3	(1)
- * Club domestic league appearances and goals

Olympic medal record

Representing Spain

Men's Football
Gold medal – first place	1992 Barcelona	Team competition

Gabriel Vidal Nova (born 5 October 1969) is a Spanish former professional footballer who played as a midfielder.

== Club career ==
Born in Palma de Mallorca, Balearic Islands, Vidal spent most of his 16-year senior career with local RCD Mallorca, playing in La Liga from 1989 to 1992 and reaching the Copa del Rey final in 1991. He made his top-flight debut on 3 September 1989, coming on as a 63rd-minute substitute in a 1–0 away loss against CA Osasuna.

Vidal made 211 official appearances for his main club. He scored 12 goals for them, one of them on 2 July 1989 in the 2–0 win over RCD Español in the promotion and relegation play-offs, the 2–1 aggregate victory confirming a return from Segunda División after one year.

Vidal also competed at the professional level with CD Leganés and Getafe CF, retiring in 2004 at age 34 after a spell with amateurs CD Atlético Baleares.

== International career ==
Vidal was part of Spain's gold medal-winning squad at the 1992 Summer Olympics, in Barcelona.

== Honours ==
Mallorca

- Copa del Rey runner-up: 1990–91

Spain U16

- UEFA European Under-16 Championship: 1986

Spain U23

- Summer Olympic Games: 1992
