= Lee Gwi-ju =

South Korean hockey player

Personal information
- Nationality: South Korean
- Born: 12 November 1972 (age 53)

Sport
- Sport: Field hockey

Lee Gwi-ju (born 12 November 1972) is a South Korean field hockey player. She competed in the women's tournament at the 1992 Summer Olympics.
