= Marta Gens =

Spanish volleyball player (born 1969)

Personal information
- Nationality: Spanish
- Born: December 30, 1969 (age 56); Tarragona, Spain

Marta Gens i Barberà (born 30 December 1969) is a Spanish former volleyball player who competed in the 1992 Summer Olympics.
