= Joel Brough =

Canadian field hockey player

Personal information
- Full name: Joel Elizabeth Brough
- Born: February 9, 1968 (age 58) Toronto, Ontario, Canada
- Height: 5 ft 5 in (165 cm)
- Weight: 130 lb (59 kg)

Sport
- Sport: Field hockey
Medal record
Women's field hockey
Representing Canada
Pan American Games
Silver medal – second place	1991 Havana	Team competition

Joel Elizabeth Brough (born February 9, 1968) is a Canadian field hockey player. She has competed in numerous international competitions. Some of the highlights include: 1989 Junior World Cup,'90 &'94 Hockey World Cup, 1989 Champions Trophy, Field hockey at the 1992 Summer Olympics and 1995 Pan American Games. She was introduced to the sport in high school where she played on numerous OFSAA winning teams. From there, Brough competed for both York University and U of T, as well as, the province of Ontario. Brough is the Head of Health and Physical Education at The Sterling Hall School in Toronto and was also a Vancouver 2010 Olympic Torchbearer. In addition, Brough was inducted into the York University "Sports Hall of Fame" in 2012.

== International competitions ==
- 1989 – Champions Trophy, (6th)
- 1989 – Junior World Cup, Ottawa (7th)
- 1990 – World Cup, Sydney (10th)
- 1991 – Pan Am Games, Havana (Silver Medal)
- 1991 – Olympic Qualifier, Auckland (3rd)
- 1992 – Olympic Games, Barcelona (7th)
- 1993 – World Cup Qualifier, Philadelphia (3rd)
- 1994 – World Cup, Dublin (10th)
