= Uxue Iparragirre =

Spanish footballer (born 2000)

Personal information
- Full name: Uxue Iparragirre Larrañaga
- Date of birth: 12 March 2000 (age 26)
- Place of birth: Antzuola, Spain
- Position: Defender

Team information
- Current team: Eibar
- Number: 27

Youth career
- 2013–2016: Antzuola
- 2016–2017: Eibar

Senior career*
Years	Team	Apps	(Gls)
2017–2019	Eibar B		
2019–2024	Eibar	13	(0)
2024–	Bergara KE	0	(0)
- * Club domestic league appearances and goals as of 12:27, 31 October 2021 (UTC)

Uxue Iparragirre Larrañaga (born 12 March 2000) is a Spanish footballer who plays as a defender for Bergara KE in Bergara, Gipuzkoa in the autonomous community of Basque Country.

== Club career ==
Iparragirre started her career at Antzuola.
