= Marta Amorós =

Spanish synchronized swimmer

Personal information
- Full name: Marta Amorós Romagosa
- Nationality: Spain
- Born: 9 August 1970 (age 55) Barcelona, Spain
- Height: 5 ft 6 in (168 cm)
- Weight: 50 kg (110 lb)

Sport
- Sport: Swimming
- Strokes: Synchronized swimming
- Club: CN Kallipolis
- Updated on 22 May 2015

Marta Amorós Romagosa (born 9 August 1970) is a former synchronized swimmer from Spain. She competed in the women's solo competition at both the 1988 and 1992 Summer Olympics.
