= Manuel Berzal Burgos =

Spanish wheelchair basketball player

Personal information
- Nationality: Spanish
- Born: 16 February 1962 (age 63); Madrid

Sport
- Country: Spain
- Sport: Wheelchair basketball (4.5 point player)

Manuel Berzal Burgos (born 16 February 1962 in Madrid) is a wheelchair basketball athlete from Spain. He has a physical disability: he is 4.5 point wheelchair basketball player. He played wheelchair basketball at the 1996 Summer Paralympics. His team was fourth.
