= Sapphire Cooper =

New Zealand field hockey player

Sapphire June Mauricienne Cooper (born 11 March 1968) is a former field hockey player from New Zealand, who finished in eight position with the National Women's Field Hockey Team, nicknamed The Black Sticks, at the 1992 Summer Olympics in Barcelona.
