= Uxue Ezkurdia =

Spanish handballer (born 1994)

Personal information
- Full name: Uxue Ezkurdia Álvarez
- Nationality: Spanish
- Born: 22 January 1994 (age 32) San Sebastián, Spain
- Height: 1.62 m (5 ft 4 in)

Sport
- Sport: Handball
- Position: Left wing
- Current club: BM Bera Bera
- Number: 7

Senior clubs
- Years: Team
- 2012–: BM Bera Bera

Uxue Ezkurdia Álvarez (born 22 January 1994) is a Spanish handballer for Super Amara Bera Bera.

== Achievements ==
- Spanish League:
  - Winner: 2012/13, 2013/14, 2014/15, 2015/16, 2017/18
- Copa de la Reina de Balonmano:
  - Winner: 2012/13, 2013/14, 2015/16
  - Runner-up: 2014/15, 2016/17, 2017/18
