= Marco Antonio González =

Spanish water polo player (born 1966)

Personal information
- Born: July 9, 1966 (age 59) Barcelona, Catalonia, Spain

Sport
- Sport: Water polo
Medal record
Representing Spain
Olympic Games
Silver medal – second place	1992 Barcelona	Team competition
World Championships
Silver medal – second place	1991 Perth	Team competition
European Championships
Silver medal – second place	1991 Athens	Team competition
Bronze medal – third place	1993 Sheffield	Team competition

Marco Antonio González Junquera (born 9 July 1966) is a former water polo player from Spain. He was a member of the national team that won the silver medal near his home town, at the 1992 Summer Olympics in Barcelona, Spain. Four years earlier, when Seoul hosted the Games, he was on the squad that finished in fifth position.

== See also ==
- List of Olympic medalists in water polo (men)
- List of World Aquatics Championships medalists in water polo
