= Lee Gyeong-hui (field hockey) =

South Korean hockey player

Personal information
- Nationality: South Korean
- Born: 17 June 1970 (age 55)

Sport
- Sport: Field hockey

Lee Gyeong-hui (born 17 June 1970) is a South Korean field hockey player. She competed in the women's tournament at the 1992 Summer Olympics.
