= Ricardo Sánchez (water polo) =

Spanish water polo player (born 1971)

Personal information
- Born: 24 February 1971 (age 55) Madrid, Spain

Sport
- Sport: Water polo
Medal record
Representing Spain
Olympic Games
Silver medal – second place	1992 Barcelona	Team competition
World Championships
Silver medal – second place	1994 Rome	Team competition
European Championships
Silver medal – second place	1991 Athens	Team competition
Bronze medal – third place	1993 Sheffield	Team competition

Ricardo Sánchez Alarcón (born 24 February 1971) is a former water polo player from Spain, who was a member of the national team that won the silver medal at the 1992 Summer Olympics in Barcelona, Spain.

== See also ==
- List of Olympic medalists in water polo (men)
- List of World Aquatics Championships medalists in water polo
