= Spain women's national field hockey team =

Spain
- Association: Real Federación Española de Hockey (Royal Spanish Hockey Federation)
- Confederation: EHF (Europe)
- Head Coach: Carlos García Cuenca
- Assistant coach(es): Jordi Fito; Óscar Palomero; Andrew Wilson
- Manager: Raúl Gómez
- Captain: Lucía Jiménez; Marta Segú
Home	Away

FIH ranking
- Current: 5 (3 October 2026)

Olympic Games
- Appearances: 8 (first in 1992)
- Best result: (gold) 1st (1992)

World Cup
- Appearances: 13 (first in 1974)
- Best result: (bronze) 3rd (2018)

EuroHockey Championship
- Appearances: 17 (first in 1984)
- Best result: (silver) 2nd (1995, 2003)

The Spain women's national field hockey team represents Spain in international women's field hockey competitions. It is controlled by the Royal Spanish Hockey Association, the governing body for field hockey in Spain.

Spain is one of six national teams to have been crowned Olympic champions, tournament they have qualified consistently since 1992 (except 2012). In the other two major tournaments, they have competed in every World Cup (except 1983, 1998, and 2014), and every European Championship, reaching ten semi-finals and winning four continental medals.

== Tournament records ==
Olympic Games
Year	Host city	Position
1980	Moscow, Soviet Union	–
1984	Los Angeles, United States	–
1988	Seoul, South Korea	–
1992	Barcelona, Spain	1st
1996	Atlanta, United States	8th
2000	Sydney, Australia	4th
2004	Athens, Greece	10th
2008	Beijing, China	7th
2012	London, United Kingdom	–
2016	Rio de Janeiro, Brazil	8th
2020	Tokyo, Japan	7th
2024	Paris, France	7th

EuroHockey Nations Championship
Year	Host city	Position
1984	Lille, France	7th
1987	London, England	5th
1991	Brussels, Belgium	6th
1995	Amsterdam, Netherlands	2nd
1999	Cologne, Germany	5th
2003	Barcelona, Spain	2nd
2005	(Republic of Ireland) Dublin, Ireland	4th
2007	Manchester, England	4th
2009	Amstelveen, Netherlands	4th
2011	Mönchengladbach, Germany	4th
2013	Boom, Belgium	5th
2015	London, England	4th
2017	Amstelveen, Netherlands	5th
2019	Antwerp, Belgium	3rd
2021	Amstelveen, Netherlands	4th
2023	Mönchengladbach, Germany	6th
2025	Mönchengladbach, Germany	3rd
2027	London, England	Qualified

World League
Year	Round	Host city	Position
2012–13	Round 2	Valencia, Spain	2nd
2012–13	Semi-final	London, England	8th
2014–15	Semi-final	Valencia, Spain	6th
2016–17	Round 2	Valencia, Spain	1st
2016–17	Semi-final	Brussels, Belgium	7th

Pro League
Year	Host city	Position
2021–22	—N/a	5th
2024–25	—N/a	6th
2025–26	—N/a	6th

World Cup
Year	Host city	Position
1974	Mandelieu, France	6th
1976	West Berlin, West Germany	5th
1978	Madrid, Spain	8th
1981	Buenos Aires, Argentina	10th
1983	Kuala Lumpur, Malaysia	–
1986	Amstelveen, Netherlands	12th
1990	Sydney, Australia	5th
1994	(Republic of Ireland) Dublin, Ireland	8th
1998	Utrecht, Netherlands	–
2002	Perth, Australia	8th
2006	Madrid, Spain	4th
2010	Rosario, Argentina	12th
2014	The Hague, Netherlands	–
2018	London, England	3rd
2022	Terrassa, Spain & Amstelveen, Netherlands	7th
2026	Wavre, Belgium & Amstelveen, Netherlands	7th

Champions Trophy
Year	Host city	Position
1987 – 1989 Did not participate
1991	Berlin, Germany	4th
1993	Amstelveen, Netherlands	5th
1995	Mar del Plata, Argentina	5th
1997 – 2000 Did not participate
2001	Amstelveen, Netherlands	6th
2002 – 2006 Did not participate
2007	Quilmes, Argentina	6th
2008 – 2018 Did not participate

Hockey Nations Cup
Year	Host city	Position
2022	Valencia, Spain	2nd
2023–24	Terrassa, Spain	1st

Champions Challenge
Year	Host city	Position
2002	Johannesburg, South Africa	–
2003	Catania, Italy	2nd
2005	Virginia Beach, United States	6th
2007	Baku, Azerbaijan	–
2009	Cape Town, South Africa	4th
2011	(Republic of Ireland) Dublin, Ireland	4th
2012	(Republic of Ireland) Dublin, Ireland	–
2014	Glasgow, Scotland	4th

== Team ==
=== Current squad ===
Roster for the 2026 Women's FIH Hockey World Cup.

Head coach: Carlos García Cuenca

4. Laura Bosch
5. Berta Serrahima
6. Clara Badia
7. Florencia Amundson
8. Lucía Jiménez (C)
10. Patricia Álvarez
11. Marta Segú (C)
13. Constanza Amundson
14. Blanca Pérez
16. Candela Mejías
17. Luciana Molina
18. Berta Agulló
20. Xantal Giné (C)
22. Laia Vidosa
24. Estel Petchamé
26. Clara Pérez (GK)
27. Paula Fernández
28. María Tello (GK)
29. Paula Jiménez
31. Sofía Keenan

=== Notable players ===
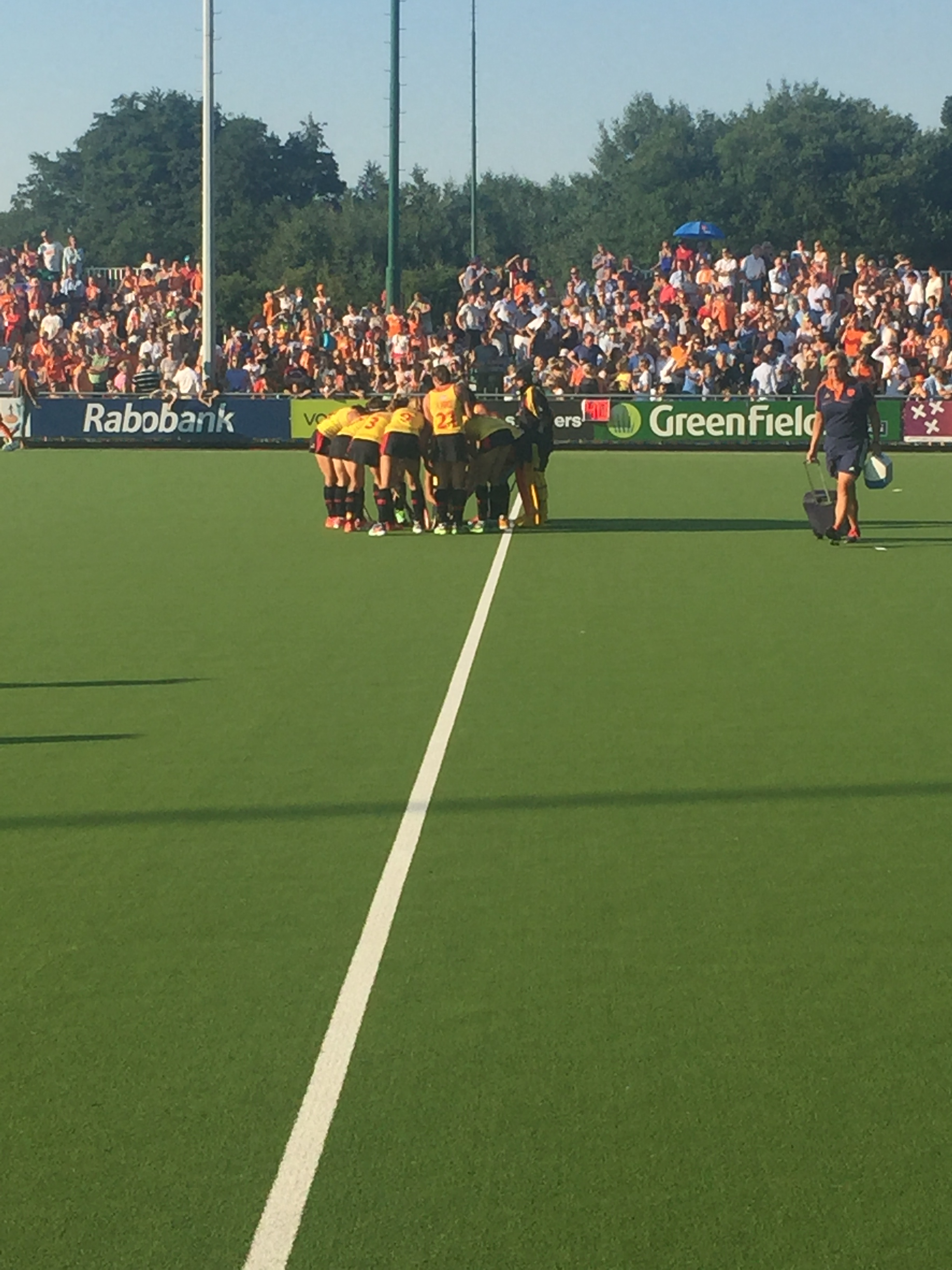
The team in 2016

- María Carmen Barea
- Sonia Barrio
- Núria Camón
- Mercedes Coghen
- Gloria Comerma
- Celia Corres
- Natalia Dorado
- Nagore Gabellanes
- Marívi González
- Raquel Huertas
- Anna Maiques
- Silvia Manrique
- Elisabeth Maragall
- María Isabel Martínez
- Teresa Motos
- Silvia Muñoz
- Nuria Olivé
- Virginia Ramírez
- María Ángeles Rodríguez
- María Romagosa
- Maider Tellería
- Maria Jesus Rosa

== Results and fixtures ==
The following is a list of match results in the last 12 months, as well as any future matches that have been scheduled.

Win Draw Loss Fixture

=== 2026 ===
5 February 2026 2025–26 Women's FIH Pro League	Spain	3–5	Belgium	Valencia, Spain
13:30	Amundson 25'; Agulló 56'; Álvarez 59'	Report	Van Remortel 16', 35'; Dewaet 17'; Belis 38'; D. Marien 55'	Stadium: Estadio Beteró

7 February 2026 2025–26 Women's FIH Pro League	Spain	1–1 (4–2 p)	Germany	Valencia, Spain
13:30	Bosch 50'	Report	Krings 24'	Stadium: Estadio Beteró
	Penalties
	P. Jiménez (penalty shoot-out scored); Vidosa (penalty shoot-out scored); Segú (penalty shoot-out scored); L. Jiménez (penalty shoot-out scored)		(penalty shoot-out scored) Haid; (penalty shoot-out missed) Frerichs; (penalty shoot-out scored) Zhong; (penalty shoot-out missed) Strauss

8 February 2026 2025–26 Women's FIH Pro League	Spain	1–0	Belgium	Valencia, Spain
13:30	Rogoski 27'	Report		Stadium: Estadio Beteró

10 February 2026 2025–26 Women's FIH Pro League	Spain	3–1	Germany	Valencia, Spain
11:00	Álvarez 37', 42', 54'	Report	Fleschütz 23'	Stadium: Estadio Beteró

20 February 2026 2025-26 Women's FIH Pro League	Australia	1–4	Spain	Hobart, Australia
19:30	Howell 10'	Report	Jimenez 6'; Rogoski 25'; Bosch 29'; Segu 53'	Stadium: Tasmanian Hockey Centre

21 February 2026 2025-26 Women's FIH Pro League	China	3–0	Spain	Hobart, Australia
19:30	Ma 3', 15'; Yu 21'	Report		Stadium: Tasmanian Hockey Centre

23 February 2026 2025-26 Women's FIH Pro League	Australia	2–2 (1–2 p)	Spain	Hobart, Australia
18:30	West 13'; Pickering 33'	Report	Mejías 48'; Giné 59'	Stadium: Tasmanian Hockey Centre
	Penalties
	Greiner (penalty shoot-out missed); Downes (penalty shoot-out scored); Cullum-Sanders (penalty shoot-out missed); Ward (penalty shoot-out missed); Schonell (penalty shoot-out missed)		(penalty shoot-out scored) P. Jiménez; (penalty shoot-out missed) Vidosa; (penalty shoot-out scored) Badia; (penalty shoot-out missed) L. Jiménez

24 February 2026 2025-26 Women's FIH Pro League	Spain	2–2 (3–4 p)	China	Tasmanian Hockey Centre, Hobart
18:30	Mejías 4'; Álvarez 40'	Report	Zhang Y. 21', 32'
	Penalties
	Jiménez (penalty shoot-out scored); Vidosa (penalty shoot-out scored); Agulló (penalty shoot-out scored); Jiménez (penalty shoot-out missed); Álvarez (penalty shoot-out missed)		(penalty shoot-out scored) L. Hong; (penalty shoot-out missed) Y. Fan; (penalty shoot-out scored) C. Liu; (penalty shoot-out scored) W. Dan; (penalty shoot-out scored) Zhong

17 June 2026 2025–26 Women's FIH Pro League	Spain	1–1 (3–0 p)	Ireland	Rotterdam, Netherlands
17:00	Mejias 9'	Report	McLoughlin 15'	Stadium: Hazelaarweg Stadion
	Penalties
	Jiménez (penalty shoot-out scored); Teresa (penalty shoot-out scored); Vidosa (penalty shoot-out scored)		(penalty shoot-out missed) Hawkshaw; (penalty shoot-out missed) McLoughlin; (penalty shoot-out missed) Power

18 June 2026 2025–26 Women's FIH Pro League	Ireland	3–1	Spain	Rotterdam, Netherlands
17:00	Kealy 29'; Carey 37'; McAuley 40'	Report	Jiménez 55'	Stadium: Hazelaarweg Stadion

20 June 2026 2025–26 Women's FIH Pro League	Netherlands	4–2	Spain	Rotterdam, Netherlands
13:00	Veen 7'; Moes 9'; Dicke 33'; Jansen 49'	Report	Lima 37'; Gine 60'	Stadium: Hazelaarweg Stadion

21 June 2026 2025–26 Women's FIH Pro League	Netherlands	1–0	Spain	Rotterdam, Netherlands
11:30	Albers 54'	Report		Stadium: Hazelaarweg Stadion

23 June 2026 2025–26 Women's FIH Pro League	Spain	2–1	Argentina	London, England
12:00	Molina 41'; Amundson 50'	Report	Alonso 15'	Stadium: Lee Valley Hockey and Tennis Centre

24 June 2026 2025–26 Women's FIH Pro League	England	0–1	Spain	London, England
11:00		Report	Amundson 27'	Stadium: Lee Valley Hockey and Tennis Centre

26 June 2026 2025–26 Women's FIH Pro League	Argentina	2–0	Spain	London, England
15:30	Trinchinetti 46'; Bruggesser 60'	Report		Stadium: Lee Valley Hockey and Tennis Centre

27 June 2026 2025–26 Women's FIH Pro League	England	4–2	Spain	London, England
13:30	Howard 10'; Hamilton 22'; Owsley 51'; Bourne 59'	Report	Molina 11'; Amundson 52'	Stadium: Lee Valley Hockey and Tennis Centre

16 August 2026 World Cup Pool B	Spain	3–2	Ireland	Wavre, Belgium
20:30	Vidosa 24'; Keenan 39'; Gine 56'	Report	McLoughlin 37'; Carey 42'	Stadium: Belfius Hockey Arena

18 August 2026 World Cup Pool B	Spain	1–1	Belgium	Wavre, Belgium
20:30	L. Jiménez 42'	Report	Vanden Borre 24'	Stadium: Belfius Hockey Arena

20 August 2026 World Cup Pool B	New Zealand	0–3	Spain	Wavre, Belgium
14:00		Report	Álvarez 40', 55', 60'	Stadium: Belfius Hockey Arena

22 August 2026 World Cup Pool F	Argentina	3–0	Spain	Wavre, Belgium
20:30	Gorzelany 1', 14'; Castellaro 3'	Report		Stadium: Belfius Hockey Arena

24 August 2026 World Cup Pool F	Spain	1–4	Germany	Wavre, Belgium
17:00	Giné 41'	Report	Krings 5'; Strauss 14'; Fleschütz 42'; Micheel 43'	Stadium: Belfius Hockey Arena

27 August 2026 World Cup 7th place match	China	1–1 (0–1 p)	Spain	Wavre, Belgium
17:00	Yu 30'	Report	Segu 15'	Stadium: Belfius Hockey Arena
	Penalties
	Li (penalty shoot-out missed); Liu (penalty shoot-out missed); Dan (penalty shoot-out missed); Fan (penalty shoot-out missed); Zhang (penalty shoot-out missed); Li (penalty shoot-out missed)		(penalty shoot-out missed) P. Jiménez; (penalty shoot-out missed) Vidosa; (penalty shoot-out missed) L. Jimenez; (penalty shoot-out missed) Agulló; (penalty shoot-out missed) Giné; (penalty shoot-out scored) L. Jiménez

== Youth teams ==
=== U-21 ===
- FIH Hockey Junior World Cup

- Semi-finalist: 2016

- EHF EuroHockey U21 Championship

- Winner: 2019
- Runner-up: 2012, 2024
- Third place: 1978, 1981, 1992, 2010

=== U-18 ===
- EHF EuroHockey U18 Championship

- Runner-up: 2021
- Third place: 2002, 2005, 2023, 2025

== See also ==
- Spain men's national field hockey team
- Spain women's national under-21 field hockey team
