= Eleuterio Mancebo =

Spanish cyclist

Personal information
- Born: 4 December 1968 (age 57) Ontinyent, Spain

Cycling career
- Sport: Cycling

Eleuterio Mancebo (born 4 December 1968) is a Spanish former cyclist. He competed in two events at the 1992 Summer Olympics.
