= No Yeong-mi =

South Korean hockey player

Personal information
- Nationality: South Korean
- Born: 17 February 1968 (age 58)

Sport
- Sport: Field hockey
Medal record
Women's field hockey
Representing South Korea
Asian Games
| Gold medal – first place | 1990 Beijing | Team |
| Gold medal – first place | 1994 Hiroshima | Team |

No Yeong-mi (born 17 February 1968) is a South Korean former field hockey player. She competed in the women's tournament at the 1992 Summer Olympics.
