= Anna Maiques =

Spanish field hockey player (born 1967)

Personal information
- Full name: Anna Maiques Dern
- Born: 3 September 1967 (age 58) Terrassa, Catalonia, Spain
Medal record
Women's Field Hockey
Representing Spain
Olympic Games
Gold medal – first place	1992 Barcelona	Team

Anna Maiques Dern (Note: In this Spanish name, the first or paternal surname is Maiques and the second or maternal family name is Dern.) (born 3 September 1967) is a former field hockey player from Spain. She was a member of the Women's National Team that won the golden medal at the 1992 Summer Olympics on home soil (Barcelona).
