= Celia Corres =

Spanish field hockey player (born 1964)

Personal information
- Full name: Celia Corres Giner
- Born: 22 January 1964 (age 62) Terrassa, Catalonia
Medal record
Women's field hockey
Representing Spain
Olympic Games
Gold medal – first place	1992 Barcelona	Team competition

Celia Corres Giner (born 22 January 1964) is a former field hockey player from Spain, who was a member of the Women's National Team that won the gold medal at the 1992 Summer Olympics on home soil (Barcelona).
