= Virginia Ramírez =

Spanish field hockey player (born 1964)

Personal information
- Full name: Virginia Ramírez Merino
- Born: 22 May 1964 (age 62) Madrid, Spain
Medal record
Women's field hockey
Representing Spain
Olympic Games
Gold medal – first place	1992 Barcelona	Team competition

Virginia Ramírez Merino (Note: In this Spanish name, the first or paternal surname is Ramírez and the second or maternal family name is Merino.) (born 22 May 1964 in Madrid) is a former field hockey player from Spain. She was a member of the Women's National Team that won the gold medal at the 1992 Summer Olympics on home soil (Barcelona).
