= Mercedes Coghen =

Spanish field hockey player (born 1962)

Medal record

Women's field hockey

Representing Spain

Olympic Games
Gold medal – first place	1992 Barcelona	Team competition

Mercedes Coghen Alberdingk-Thijm (born 2 August 1962 in Madrid) is a former field hockey player from Spain, who captained the Women's National Team that won the golden medal at the 1992 Summer Olympics on home soil (Barcelona). She was a member of the committee of the Madrid 2012 bid and chair of the Madrid 2016 bid to host Summer Olympic Games.
