= Mariví González =

Spanish field hockey player (born 1961)

Medal record

Women's field hockey

Representing Spain

Olympic Games
Gold medal – first place	1992 Barcelona	Team competition

María Victoria "Mariví" González Laguillo (born 27 February 1961 in Ciudad de México, Distrito Federal) is a former field hockey player from Spain. She was born in Mexico. She was a member of the Women's National Team that surprisingly won the golden medal at the 1992 Summer Olympics on home soil (Barcelona). She also competed in the 1996 Summer Olympics in Atlanta, Georgia.
