= Nuria Olivé =

Spanish field hockey player (born 1968)

Personal information
- Born: 20 August 1968 (age 57)
Medal record
Women's Field Hockey
Representing Spain
Olympic Games
Gold medal – first place	1992 Barcelona	Team competition

Nuria Olivé Vancells (born 20 August 1968 in Barcelona, Catalonia) is a former field hockey player from Spain. She was a member of the Women's National Team that won the gold medal at the 1992 Summer Olympics on home soil (Barcelona).
