= Teresa Motos =

Spanish field hockey player (born 1963)

Personal information
- Born: 29 December 1963 (age 62)
Medal record
Women's Field Hockey
Representing Spain
Olympic Games
Gold medal – first place	1992 Barcelona	Team competition

Teresa Motos Izeta (born 29 December 1963 in Guipúzcoa) is a former field hockey player from Spain. She was a member of the Women's National Team that won the gold medal at the 1992 Summer Olympics on home soil (Barcelona). Motos also competed in the 1996 Summer Olympics in Atlanta, Georgia, where Spain finished in 8th and last position.
