= Antonio Vázquez (archer) =

Spanish archer (born 1961)

Olympic medal record

Men's Archery
Gold medal – first place	1992 Barcelona	Team

Antonio Vázquez Megido (born 26 January 1961) is a Spanish archer who competed in the 1980 Summer Olympics, in the 1988 Summer Olympics, in the 1992 Summer Olympics, and in the 1996 Summer Olympics.

== Sporting career ==
Mejido was born in Levinco, a small town in the Aller district of Asturias Mining Basin. His father was a security guard at the La Carinsa open-pit coal mine and his mother was a teacher. When he was six the family moved to the city in Oviedeo. He described this like moving to a prison because he loved the rural countryside.

In 1980 he finished 29th in the individual competition. Eight years later at the 1988 Summer Olympics he finished 32nd in the individual event. He was also part of the Spanish team which finished 17th in the team competition.

1992 he finished 18th in the individual qualification round and was eliminated in the first round of the knockout stage. But with the Spanish team he won an astonishing gold medal in the team event.

His last Olympic appearance was in 1996 when he finished 60th in the individual qualification round. In the following knockout stage he was eliminated in the first round.

He was the first archer to achieve a perfect 360 point score at 30 meters, a world record set in Weltsheim, Germany 1992.
