= María Isabel Martínez =

Spanish field hockey player (born 1967)

Personal information
- Full name: María Isabel Martínez de Murguía Embarba
- Born: 16 October 1967 (age 58)
Medal record
Women's field hockey
Representing Spain
Olympic Games
Gold medal – first place	1992 Barcelona	Team competition
European Nations Cup
Silver medal – second place	1995 Amstelveen	Team competition

María Isabel Martínez de Murguía Embarba (born 16 October 1967 in Madrid) is a former field hockey player from Spain. She was a member of the Women's National Team that surprisingly won the gold medal at the 1992 Summer Olympics on home soil (Barcelona)
