= María Ángeles Rodríguez =

Spanish field hockey player (born 1957)

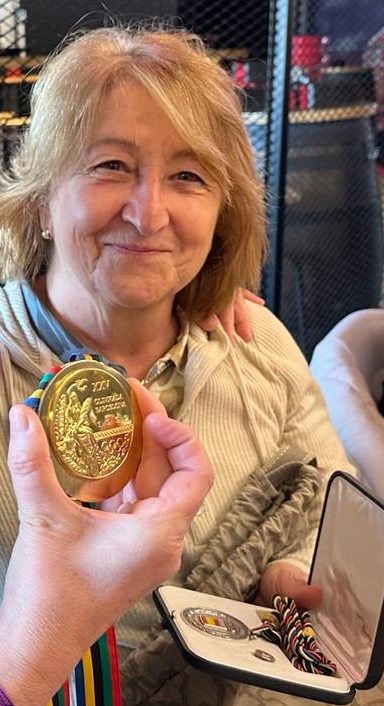

Medal record

Women's field hockey

Representing Spain

Olympic Games
Gold medal – first place	1992 Barcelona	Team competition

María ("Masa") Ángeles Rodríguez Suárez (born 12 April 1957 in Gijón, Asturias) is a former field hockey player from Spain, who was a member of the Women's National Team that won the gold medal at the 1992 Summer Olympics on home soil (Barcelona).
