= Elisabeth Maragall =

Spanish field hockey player (born 1970)

Personal information
- Full name: Elisabeth Maragall Verge
- Nickname: Eli
- Born: 25 November 1970 (age 55) Barcelona, Spain
Medal record
Women's field hockey
Representing Spain
Olympic Games
Gold medal – first place	1992 Barcelona	Team competition

Elisabeth "Eli" Maragall Verge (born 25 November 1970 in Barcelona, Spain) is a former field hockey player from Spain. She was a member of the Women's National Team that won the gold medal at the 1992 Summer Olympics on home soil (Barcelona).
