= Silvia Manrique =

Spanish field hockey player (born 1973)

Personal information
- Born: 6 March 1973 (age 53)
Medal record
Women's field hockey
Representing Spain
Olympic Games
Gold medal – first place	1992 Barcelona	Team competition
Champions Challenge
Silver medal – second place	2003 Catania	Team competition
European Nations Cup
Silver medal – second place	1995 Amstelveen	Team Competition

Silvia Manrique Pérez (born 6 March 1973 in Llodio, Álava) is a former field hockey player from Spain, who was a member of the Women's National Team that won the gold medal at the 1992 Summer Olympics on home soil (Barcelona). She also competed in the 1996 Summer Olympics in Atlanta, Georgia, where Spain finished in 8th and last position.
