= Field hockey at the 1992 Summer Olympics – Women's tournament =

Women's field hockey at the 1992 Summer Olympics

Tournament details
- Host country: Spain
- City: Barcelona
- Dates: 27 July – 7 August
- Teams: 8 (from 4 confederations)
- Venue: Estadi Olímpic de Terrassa

Final positions
- Champions: Spain (1st title)
- Runner-up: Germany
- Third place: Great Britain

Tournament statistics
- Matches played: 20
- Goals scored: 64 (3.2 per match)
- Top scorer(s): (Germany) Franziska Hentschel (United Kingdom) Jane Sixsmith (5 goals)

The women's field hockey tournament at the 1992 Summer Olympics was the 4th edition of the field hockey event for women at the Summer Olympic Games. It was held over a twelve-day period beginning on 27 July, and culminating with the medal finals on 7 August. All games were played at the Estadi Olímpic de Terrassa in Terrassa, Spain, located 30 kilometers from Barcelona.

Spain won the gold medal for the first time after defeating Germany 2–1 in the final with a golden goal. Great Britain won the bronze medal by defeating South Korea 4–3.

== Qualification ==
Dates	Event	Location	Quotas	Qualifier(s)
—N/a	Hosts	—N/a	1	Spain
21–30 September 1988	1988 Summer Olympics	Seoul, South Korea	1	Australia
2–13 May 1990	1990 World Cup	Sydney, Australia	1	Netherlands
27 July – 7 August 1991	1991 Olympic Qualifier	Auckland, New Zealand	5	Canada; Germany; Great Britain; New Zealand; South Korea
Total			8	

== Results ==
=== Preliminary round ===
==== Group A ====
Teams	Pld	W	D	L	GF	GA	GD	Pts
Germany	3	2	1	0	7	2	+5	5
Spain	3	2	1	0	5	3	+2	5
Australia	3	1	0	2	2	2	0	2
Canada	3	0	0	3	1	8	−7	0

27 July 1992
16:00

Australia	2–0	Canada
Tooth 40'; Haslam 60'	Report

Umpires:
Dominique Ache (BEL)
Lee Mi-ok (KOR)

27 July 1992
17:30

Spain	2–2	Germany
Motos 35+', 47'	Report	Hentschel 17', 27'

Umpires:
Gill Clarke (GBR)
Jolanda Mohlmann (NED)

29 July 1992
17:30

Australia	0–1	Germany
	Report	Becker 65'

Umpires:
Laura Crespo (ARG)
Dominique Ache (BEL)

29 July 1992
18:00

Spain	2–1	Canada
Motos 5', 47'	Report	Covey 63'

Umpires:
Gill Clarke (GBR)
Jane Robertson (GBR)

2 August 1992
18:00

Canada	0–4	Germany
	Report	Dickenscheid 12'; Hentschel 16', 57'; Becker 22'

Umpires:
Renee Chatas (USA)
Dominique Ache (BEL)

2 August 1992
20:00

Spain	1–0	Australia
Manrique 4'	Report

Umpires:
Jolanda Mohlmann (NED)
Jane Robertson (GBR)

==== Group B ====
Teams	Pld	W	D	L	GF	GA	GD	Pts
South Korea	3	2	0	1	8	3	+5	4
Great Britain	3	2	0	1	7	5	+2	4
Netherlands	3	2	0	1	4	3	+1	4
New Zealand	3	0	0	3	2	10	−8	0

27 July 1992
18:00

New Zealand	0–5	South Korea
	Report	Lee Kyoung-hei 25', 44'; Kwon Chang-sook 42'; Chang Eun-jung 47', 55'

Umpires:
Christianne Asselman (BEL)
Laura Crespo (ARG)

27 July 1992
20:00

Netherlands	2–1	Great Britain
Lejeune 33'; De Ruiter 56'	Report

Umpires:
Peri Buckley (AUS)
Virginnia Davilla (ESP)

29 July 1992
16:00

South Korea	1–3	Great Britain
Chang Eun-jung 49'	Report	Sixsmith 17', 54'; S. Fraser 32'

Umpires:
Virginnia Davilla (ESP)
Salobrar Hernandez (ESP)

29 July 1992
20:00

Netherlands	2–0	New Zealand
Lejeune 12', 28'	Report

Umpires:
Margaret Lanning (CAN)
Renee Chatas (USA)

2 August 1992
16:00

South Korea	2–0	Netherlands
Lee Kyoung-hei 8'; Yang Hea-sook 41'	Report

Umpires:
Peri Buckley (AUS)
Salobrar Hernandez (ESP)

2 August 1992
17:30

New Zealand	2–3	Great Britain
Bell-Kake 21'; Clinton 61'	Report	Johnson 10', 57'; Ramsay 50'

Umpires:
Margaret Lanning (CAN)
Christianne Asselman (BEL)

=== Fifth to eighth place classification ===
Crossover
4 August
Australia	5
New Zealand	1
4 August
Netherlands	2
Canada	0

Fifth place
6 August
Australia	2
Netherlands	0
Seventh place
6 August
New Zealand	0
Canada	2

==== Crossover ====
4 August 1992
09:30

Australia	5–1	New Zealand
Pereira 2', 12', 44'; Hager 14'; Hawkes 57'	Report	Clinton 53'

Umpires:
Lee Mi-ok (KOR)
Salobrar Hernandez (ESP)

4 August 1992
17:30

Netherlands	2–0	Canada
Lejeune 55'; Steenberghe 61'	Report

Umpires:
Virginnia Davilla (ESP)
Gill Clarke (GBR)

==== Seventh and eighth place ====
6 August 1992
09:30

New Zealand	0–2	Canada
	Report	Covey 45'; Gaiga 58'

Umpires:
Christianne Asselman (BEL)
Renee Chatas (USA)

==== Fifth and sixth place ====
6 August 1992
17:30

Australia	2–0	Netherlands
Powell 49'; Annan 50'	Report

Umpires:
Jane Robertson (GBR)
Margaret Lanning (CAN)

=== First to fourth place classification ===
Semi-finals
4 August 1992
Germany	2
Great Britain	1
4 August 1992
South Korea	1
Spain	2

Final
7 August
Germany	1
Spain	2
Third place
7 August
Great Britain	4
South Korea	3

==== Semi-finals ====
4 August 1992
17:00

Germany	2–1	Great Britain
Ernsting-Krienke 12'; Lätzsch 59'	Report	Sixsmith 32'

Umpires:
Jolanda Mohlmann (NED)
Laura Crespo (ARG)

4 August 1992
19:30

South Korea	1–2 (a.e.t.)	Spain
Kwon Chang-sook 29'	Report	Dorado 9'; Carmen Barea 98'

Umpires:
Dominique Ache (BEL)
Peri Buckley (AUS)

==== Bronze medal match ====
7 August 1992
17:00

(bronze) Great Britain	4–3 (a.e.t.)	South Korea
Sixsmith 7', 82'; Johnson 44'; S. Fraser 48'	Report	Ro Young-mi 3'; Chang Eun-jung 17'; Lim Kye-sook 56'

Umpires:
Jolanda Mohlmann (NED)
Solabrar Hernandez (ESP)

==== Gold medal match ====
7 August 1992
19:30

(silver) Germany	1–2 (a.e.t.)	Spain (gold)
Hentschel 12'	Report	Carmen Barea 8'; Maragall 83'

Umpires:
Dominique Ache (BEL)
Peri Buckley (AUS)

== Final standings ==
1. Spain
2. Germany
3. Great Britain
4. South Korea
5. Australia
6. Netherlands
7. Canada
8. New Zealand
