= Field hockey at the 1996 Summer Olympics – Women's team squads =

List of hockey players

The following is the list of squads that took place in the women's field hockey tournament at the 1996 Summer Olympics.

== Argentina ==
The following players represented Argentina:

- Mariana Arnal
- Sofía MacKenzie
- Magdalena Aicega
- Silvina Corvalán
- Anabel Gambero
- Julieta Castellán
- Gabriela Pando
- Gabriela Sánchez
- Vanina Oneto
- Jorgelina Rimoldi
- Karina Masotta
- María Castelli
- Verónica Artica
- Cecilia Rognoni
- Ayelén Stepnik
- Mariana González

== Australia ==
The following players represented Australia:

- Clover Maitland
- Danni Roche
- Liane Tooth
- Alyson Annan
- Juliet Haslam
- Jenny Morris
- Louise Dobson
- Lisa Powell-Carruthers
- Karen Marsden
- Kate Starre
- Renita Farrell-Garard
- Jackie Pereira
- Nova Peris-Kneebone
- Rechelle Hawkes
- Triny Powell
- Michelle Andrews

== Germany ==
The following players represented Germany:

- Susanne Wollschläger
- Birgit Beyer
- Vanessa van Kooperen
- Tanja Dickenscheid
- Nadine Ernsting-Krienke
- Simone Thomaschinski-Gräßer
- Irina Kuhnt
- Melanie Cremer
- Franziska Hentschel
- Tina Peters
- Eva Hagenbäumer
- Britta Becker
- Natascha Keller
- Philippa Suxdorf
- Heike Lätzsch
- Katrin Kauschke

== Great Britain ==
The following players represented Great Britain:

- Jo Thompson
- Hilary Rose
- Christine Cook
- Tina Cullen
- Karen Brown
- Jill Atkins
- Sue Fraser
- Rhona Simpson
- Mandy Nichols-Nicholson
- Jane Sixsmith
- Pauline Robertson
- Joanne Mould
- Tammy Miller
- Anna Bennett
- Mandy Davies
- Kath Johnson

== Netherlands ==
The following players represented the Netherlands:

- Jacqueline Toxopeus
- Stella de Heij
- Fleur van de Kieft
- Carole Thate
- Ellen Kuipers
- Jeannette Lewin
- Nicole Koolen
- Dillianne van den Boogaard
- Margje Teeuwen
- Mijntje Donners
- Willemijn Duyster
- Suzanne Plesman
- Noor Holsboer
- Florentine Steenberghe
- Wietske de Ruiter
- Suzan van der Wielen

== South Korea ==
The following players represented South Korea:

- You Jae-sook
- Choi Eun-kyung
- Cho Eun-jung
- Oh Seung-shin
- Lim Jeong-sook
- Kim Myung-ok
- Chang Eun-jung
- Lee Ji-young
- Lee Eun-kyung
- Kwon Soo-hyun
- Woo Hyun-jung
- Choi Mi-soon
- Lee Eun-young
- Jeon Young-sun
- Kwon Chang-sook
- Jin Deok-san

== Spain ==
The following players represented Spain:

- Elena Carrión
- Natalia Dorado
- María Cruz González
- Carmen Barea
- Silvia Manrique
- Nagore Gabellanes
- Teresa Motos
- Sonia Barrio
- Mónica Rueda
- Lucía López
- María del Mar Feito
- Maider Tellería
- Elena Urkizu
- Begoña Larzabal
- Sonia de Ignacio
- Mariví González

== United States ==
The following players represented the United States:

- Patty Shea
- Laurel Martin
- Liz Tchou
- Marcia Pankratz
- Cindy Werley
- Diane Madl
- Kris Fillat
- Kelli James
- Tracey Fuchs
- Antoinette Lucas
- Katie Kauffman
- Andrea Wieland
- Leslie Lyness
- Barb Marois
- Jill Reeve
- Pamela Bustin
