= Field hockey at the 1996 Summer Olympics – Women's tournament =

Women's field hockey at the 1996 Summer Olympics
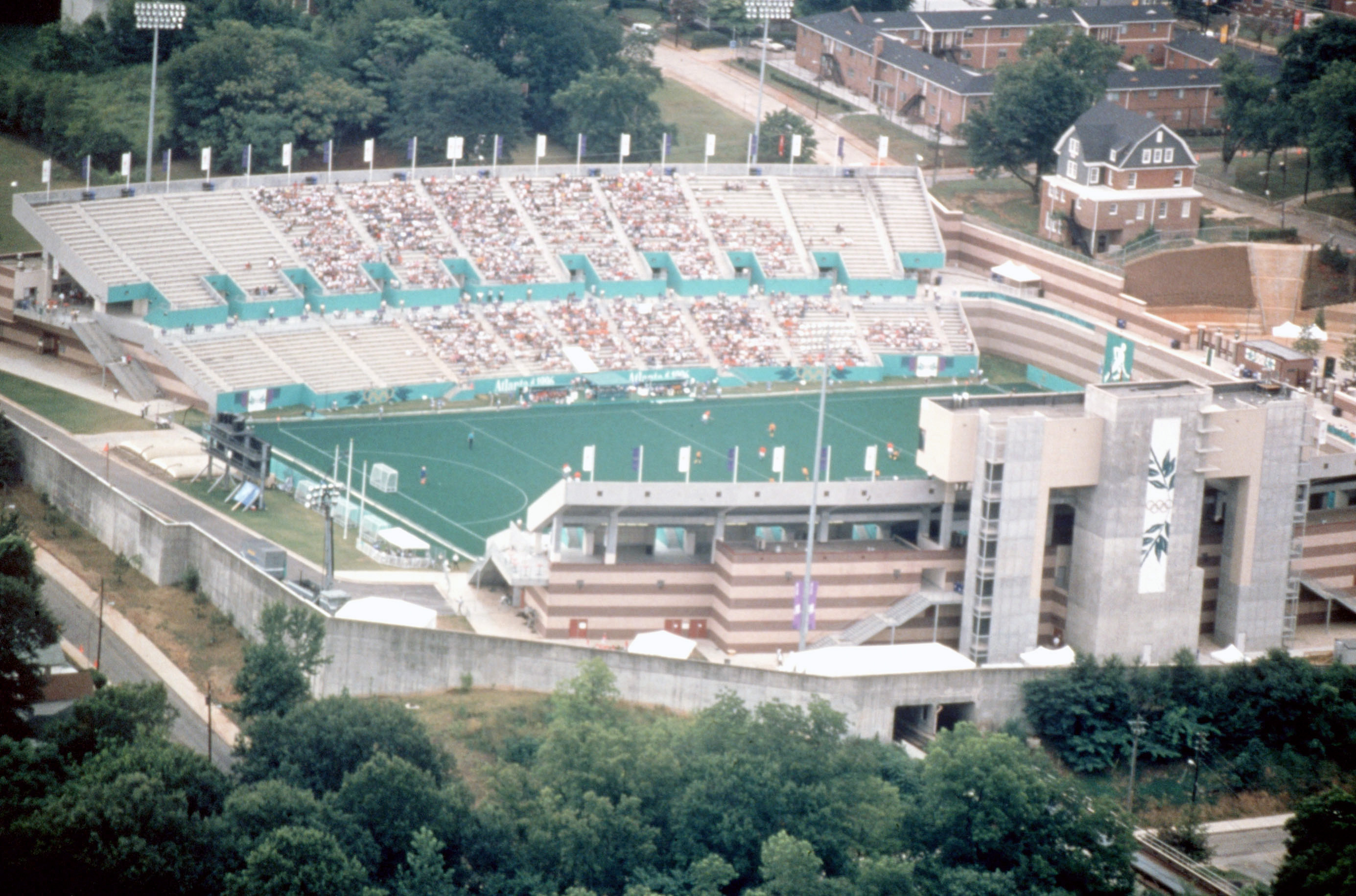

Tournament details
- Host country: United States
- City: Atlanta
- Dates: 20 July – 1 August
- Teams: 8
- Venue(s): Herndon Stadium; Panther Stadium

Final positions
- Champions: Australia (2nd title)
- Runner-up: South Korea
- Third place: Netherlands

Tournament statistics
- Matches played: 30
- Goals scored: 103 (3.43 per match)
- Top scorer(s): (Australia) Alyson Annan (South Korea) Chang Eun-jung (8 goals)

The women's field hockey tournament at the 1996 Summer Olympics was the 5th edition of the field hockey event for women at the Summer Olympic Games. It was held over a thirteen-day period beginning on 20 July, and culminating with the medal finals on 1 August. Games were played at the Herndon Stadium and the Panther Stadium, both located in Atlanta.

Australia won the gold medal for the second time after defeating Korea 3–1 in the final. The Netherlands won the bronze medal by defeating Great Britain 4–3 in the final on penalty strokes after a 0–0 draw.

== Qualification ==
The previous Olympic and World champions and the host nation received an automatic berth. Along with the five teams qualifying through the Olympic Qualification Tournament, eight teams competed in this tournament.

| Dates | Event | Location | Qualifier(s) |
|---|---|---|---|
| Host nation | | | United States |
| 27 July – 7 August 1992 | 1992 Summer Olympics | Barcelona, Spain | Spain |
| 13–23 July 1994 | 1994 Hockey World Cup | (Republic of Ireland) Dublin, Ireland | Australia |
| 15–26 November 1995 | Olympic Qualification Tournament | Cape Town, South Africa | South Korea; Great Britain; Germany; Argentina; Netherlands |

== Umpires ==
- Angela Lario Ruiz (ESP)
- Carola Heinrichs (GER)
- Gill Clarke (ENG)
- Gina Spitaleri (ITA)
- Janice McDonald (GBR)
- Kazuko Yasueda (JPN)
- Laura Crespo (ARG)
- Lee Mi-ok (KOR)
- Margaret Lanning (CAN)
- Miriam van Gemert (NED)
- Naomi Kato (JPN)
- Peri Buckley (AUS)
- Renée Chatas (USA)

== Results ==
All times are Eastern Daylight Time (UTC−04:00)

=== Preliminary round ===
| Pos | Team | Pld | W | D | L | GF | GA | GD | Pts | Qualification |
|---|---|---|---|---|---|---|---|---|---|---|
| 1 | Australia | 7 | 6 | 1 | 0 | 24 | 4 | +20 | 13 | Gold medal match |
| 2 | South Korea | 7 | 4 | 2 | 1 | 18 | 9 | +9 | 10 | Gold medal match |
| 3 | Great Britain | 7 | 3 | 2 | 2 | 12 | 11 | +1 | 8 | Bronze medal match |
| 4 | Netherlands | 7 | 3 | 2 | 2 | 15 | 15 | 0 | 8 | Bronze medal match |
| 5 | United States (H) | 7 | 2 | 2 | 3 | 8 | 11 | −3 | 6 | |
| 6 | Germany | 7 | 2 | 1 | 4 | 10 | 11 | −1 | 5 | |
| 7 | Argentina | 7 | 2 | 1 | 4 | 7 | 21 | −14 | 5 | |
| 8 | Spain | 7 | 0 | 1 | 6 | 5 | 17 | −12 | 1 | |

Source: FIH
Rules for classification: 1) points; 2) goal difference; 3) goals scored; 4) head-to-head result.
(H) Hosts

20 July 1996
09:00

| United States | 1–1 | Netherlands |
|---|---|---|
| Pankratz 69' | Report | Dubbeldam 63' |

Umpires:
Naomi Kato (JPN)
Gina Spitaleri (ITA)

20 July 1996
11:00

| Australia | 4–0 | Spain |
|---|---|---|
| Andrews 32'; L. Powell 54'; Hawkes 65'; Annan 69' | Report |

Umpires:
Kazuko Yasueda (JPN)
Miriam van Gemert (NED)

20 July 1996
17:30

| Argentina | 0–2 | Germany |
|---|---|---|
| | Report | van Kooperan 17'; Lätzsch 39' |

Umpires:
Janice McDonald (GBR)
Angela Lario Ruiz (ESP)

20 July 1996
20:00

| South Korea | 5–0 | Great Britain |
|---|---|---|
| Cho Eun-jung 22', 70'; Choi Mi-soon 43'; Kwon Chang-sook 46'; Kwon Soo-hyun 67' | Report |

Umpires:
Margaret Lanning (CAN)
Carola Heinrichs (GER)

21 July 1996
17:30

| Spain | 1–2 | Germany |
|---|---|---|
| Tellería 31' | Report | Hentschel 15' van Kooperen 56' |

Umpires:
Laura Crespo (ARG)
Gill Clarke (GBR)

21 July 1996
20:00

| Netherlands | 1–1 | Great Britain |
|---|---|---|
| Lewin 11' | Report | Cook 41' |

Umpires:
Peri Buckley (AUS)
Lee Mi-Ok (KOR)

22 July 1996
09:00

| Australia | 7–1 | Argentina |
|---|---|---|
| Farrell 9'; K. Powell 25'; Annan 30', 49', 50'; Roche 61'; L. Powell 63' | Report | Rimoldi 43' |

Umpires:
Angela Lario Ruiz (ESP)
Carola Heinrichs (GER)

22 July 1996
11:00

| United States | 3–2 | South Korea |
|---|---|---|
| Fuchs 5'; Pankratz 25'; Marois 70' | Report | Chang Eun-jung 49'; Lee Eun-kyung 62' |

Umpires:
Margaret Lanning (CAN)
Naomi Kato (JPN)

23 July 1996
09:00

| Australia | 1–0 | Germany |
|---|---|---|
| Roche 25' | Report |

Umpires:
Lee Mi-ok (KOR)
Gina Spitaleri (ITA)

23 July 1996
11:00

| Spain | 0–1 | Argentina |
|---|---|---|
| | Report | Rimoldi 44' |

Umpires:
Janice McDonald (GBR)
Miriam van Gemert (NED)

23 July 1996
17:30

| Netherlands | 1–3 | South Korea |
|---|---|---|
| de Ruiter 52' | Report | Chang Eun-jung 40', 63'; Cho Eun-jung 44' |

Umpires:
Renée Chatas (USA)
Gill Clarke (GBR)

23 July 1996
20:00

| United States | 0–1 | Great Britain |
|---|---|---|
| | Report | Simpson 51' |

Umpires:
Kazuko Yasueda (JPN)
Laura Crespo (ARG)

25 July 1996
09:00

| Spain | 2–2 | Great Britain |
|---|---|---|
| Dorado 22'; Gabellanes 55' | Report | Fraser 18'; Johnson 66' |

Umpires:
Lee Mi-ok (KOR)
Renée Chatas (USA)

25 July 1996
11:00

| Netherlands | 4–3 | Germany |
|---|---|---|
| Dubbeldam 3' de Ruiter 21'; Donners 52', 63' | Report | Becker 27', 43'; Cremer 55' |

Umpires:
Laura Crespo (ARG)
Margaret Lanning (CAN)

25 July 1996
17:30

| Australia | 3–3 | South Korea |
|---|---|---|
| Annan 32'; Morris 35'; K. Powell 70' | Report | Chang Eun-jung 39', 47'; Cho Eun-jung 60' |

Umpires:
Angela Lario Ruiz (ESP)
Gill Clarke (GBR)

25 July 1996
20:00

| United States | 1–2 | Argentina |
|---|---|---|
| Marois 26' | Report | Masotta 5'; MacKenzie 60' |

Umpires:
Peri Buckley (AUS)
Carola Heinrichs (GER)

26 July 1996
17:30

| United States | 1–1 | Germany |
|---|---|---|
| Werley 54' | Report | Cremer 3' |

Umpires:
Kazuko Yasueda (JPN)
Janice McDonald (GBR)

26 July 1996
20:00

| Australia | 1–0 | Great Britain |
|---|---|---|
| Andrews 29' | Report |

Umpires:
Miriam van Gemert (NED)
Naomi Kato (JPN)

27 July 1996
09:00

| Spain | 0–2 | South Korea |
|---|---|---|
| | Report | Chang Eun-jung 25'; Lee Eun-young 48' |

Umpires:
Carola Heinrichs (GER)
Peri Buckley (AUS)

27 July 1996
11:00

| Netherlands | 4–1 | Argentina |
|---|---|---|
| Donners 5' de Ruiter 14', 45', 48' | Report | Masotta 39' |

Umpires:
Gina Spitaleri (ITA)
Angela Lario Ruiz (ESP)

28 July 1996
09:00

| Germany | 2–3 | Great Britain |
|---|---|---|
| Hentschel 29'; Becker 38' | Report | Atkins 51', 69'; Sixsmith 61' |

Umpires:
Miriam van Gemert (NED)
Laura Crespo (ARG)

28 July 1996
11:00

| Australia | 4–0 | United States |
|---|---|---|
| Morris 3'; K. Powell 9'; L. Powell 17'; Kate Starre 24' | Report |

Umpires:
Gill Clarke (GBR)
Kazuko Yasueda (JPN)

28 July 1996
17:30

| Spain | 2–4 | Netherlands |
|---|---|---|
| López 27'; Barrio 60' | Report | de Ruiter 7', 11'; Thate 29'; Donners 51' |

Umpires:
Lee Mi-Ok (KOR)
Naomi Kato (JPN)

28 July 1996
20:00

| Argentina | 2–2 | South Korea |
|---|---|---|
| MacKenzie 10'; Castelli 16' | Report | Cho Eun-jung 33'; Chang Eun-jung 46' |

Umpires:
Margaret Lanning (CAN)
Renée Chatas (USA)

30 July 1996
09:00

| Argentina | 0–5 | Great Britain |
|---|---|---|
| | Report | Nicholls 8', 68'; Sixsmith 13', 61', 67' |

Umpires:
Peri Buckley (AUS)
Renée Chatas (USA)

30 July 1996
11:00

| Germany | 0–1 | South Korea |
|---|---|---|
| | Report | Chang Eun-jung 31' |

Umpires:
Gina Spitaleri (ITA)
Naomi Kato (JPN)

30 July 1996
17:30

| Spain | 0–2 | United States |
|---|---|---|
| | Report | Pankratz 18'; Tchou 48' |

Umpires:
Janice McDonald (GBR)
Carola Heinrichs (GER)

30 July 1996
20:00

| Australia | 4–0 | Netherlands |
|---|---|---|
| Morris 45'; Roche 60'; Andrews 63'; Annan 68' | Report |

Umpires:
Laura Crespo (ARG)
Angela Lario Ruiz (ESP)

=== Medal round ===
==== Bronze medal match ====
1 August 1996
17:00

| Great Britain | 0–0 (a.e.t.) | Netherlands (bronze) |
|---|---|---|
| | Report |
Penalties
| Cook (penalty shoot-out scored); Brown (penalty shoot-out missed); Fraser (penalty shoot-out scored); Robertson (penalty shoot-out scored); Johnson (penalty shoot-out missed) | 3–4 | (penalty shoot-out scored) Donners; (penalty shoot-out missed) van den Boogaard; (penalty shoot-out scored) Thate; (penalty shoot-out scored) Lewin; (penalty shoot-out scored) van der Wielen |

Umpires:
Angela Lario Ruiz (ESP)
Kazuko Yasueda (JPN)

==== Gold medal match ====
1 August 1996
19:30

| (gold) Australia | 3–1 | South Korea (silver) |
|---|---|---|
| Annan 14', 44'; Powell 63' | Report | Cho Eun-jung 30' |

Umpires:
Miram van Gemert (NED)
Gill Clarke (GBR)

== Statistics ==
=== Final ranking ===
1. Australia
2. South Korea
3. Netherlands
4. Great Britain
5. United States
6. Germany
7. Argentina
8. Spain

=== Scorers ===
8 goals

- (Australia) Alyson Annan
- (South Korea) Chang Eun-jung

7 goals

- (Netherlands) Wietske de Ruiter

6 goals

- (South Korea) Cho Eun-jung

4 goals

- (Australia) Katrina Powell
- (United Kingdom) Jane Sixsmith
- (Netherlands) Mijntje Donners

3 goals

- (Australia) Danielle Roche
- (Australia) Jenn Morris
- (Australia) Lisa Powell
- (Australia) Michelle Andrews
- (Germany) Britta Becker
- (Germany) Franziska Hentschel
- (United States) Marcia Pankratz

2 goals

- (Argentina) Jorgelina Rimoldi
- (Argentina) Karina Masotta
- (Argentina) Sofía MacKenzie
- (United Kingdom) Jill Atkins
- (United Kingdom) Mandy Nicholls
- (Germany) Vanessa van Kooperen
- (Netherlands) Ellen Kuipers
- (United States) Barbara Marois

1 goal

- (Argentina) María Castelli
- (Australia) Kate Starre
- (Australia) Rechelle Hawkes
- (Australia) Renita Farrell
- (Spain) Lucía López
- (Spain) Maider Tellería
- (Spain) Nagore Gabellanes
- (Spain) Natalia Dorado
- (Spain) Sonia Barrio
- (United Kingdom) Christine Cook
- (United Kingdom) Kathryn Johnson
- (United Kingdom) Rhona Simpson
- (United Kingdom) Susan Fraser
- (Germany) Heike Lätzsch
- (Germany) Melanie Cremer
- (South Korea) Choi Mi-soon
- (South Korea) Kwon Chang-sook
- (South Korea) Kwon Soo-hyun
- (South Korea) Lee Eun-kyung
- (South Korea) Lee Eun-young
- (Netherlands) Carole Thate
- (Netherlands) Jeannette Lewin
- (United States) Cindy Werley
- (United States) Liz Tchou
- (United States) Tracey Fuchs
