= 1995 Women's Hockey Champions Trophy =

International hockey tournament

Tournament details
- Host country: Argentina
- City: Mar del Plata
- Teams: 6

Final positions
- Champions: Australia (4th title)
- Runner-up: South Korea
- Third place: United States

Tournament statistics
- Matches played: 18
- Goals scored: 50 (2.78 per match)
- Top scorer(s): (Australia) Michelle Andrews (South Korea) Cho Eun-Jung (4 goals)

The 1995 Women's Hockey Champions Trophy was the 5th edition of the Hockey Champions Trophy for women. It was held between 9–17 September 1995 in Mar del Plata, Argentina.

Australia won the tournament for the third consecutive time after defeating South Korea 4–3 in the final on penalty strokes after a 1–1 draw.

== Teams ==
The participating teams were determined by International Hockey Federation (FIH):

- Australia (defending champions and champions of 1994 World Cup)
- Spain (champions of 1992 Summer Olympics)
- Argentina (host nation)
- United States (third in 1994 World Cup)
- Germany (fourth in 1994 World Cup)
- South Korea (fifth in 1994 World Cup)

== Squads ==
Argentina

Head Coach: Sergio Vigil

1. Mariana Arnal (GK)
2. Sofía MacKenzie
3. Marisa López
4. Silvia Corvalán
5. Anabel Gambero
6. Julieta Castellán
7. Gabriela Pando
8. Gabriela Sánchez (c)
9. Vanina Oneto
10. Jorgelina Rimoldi
11. Karina Masotta
12. María Castelli
13. Verónica Artica (GK)
14. Valeria Almada
15. Magdalena Aicega
16. Ximena Camardón
Australia

Head Coach: Ric Charlesworth

1. Justine Sowry (GK)
2. Katie Allen
3. Nikki Mott
4. Alyson Annan
5. Juliet Haslam
6. Jenn Morris
7. Alison Peek
8. Lisa Powell
9. Clover Maitland (GK)
10. Kate Starre
11. Renita Farrell
12. Jackie Pereira
13. Nova Peris
14. Rechelle Hawkes (c)
15. Claire Mitchell-Taverner
16. Michelle Andrews
Germany
1. Bianca Heinz (GK)
2. Birgit Beyer (GK)
3. Philippa Suxdorf
4. Katrin Kauschke
5. Nadine Ernsting-Krienke
6. Simone Thomaschinski
7. Irina Kuhnt
8. Melanie Cremer
9. Franziska Hentschel (c)
10. Tanja Dickenscheid
11. Eva Hagenbäumer
12. Britta Becker
13. Natascha Keller
14. Denise Klecker
15. Heike Lätzsch
16. Ilhem Merabet
South Korea
1. You Jae-sook (GK)
2. Choi Eun-kyung
3. Cho Eun-jung
4. Oh Seung-shin
5. Lim Jeong-sook
6. Kim Myung-ok
7. Chang Eun-jung (c)
8. Lee Ji-young
9. Lee Eun-kyung
10. Kwon Soo-hyun
11. Woo Hyun-jung
12. Choi Moon-hee
13. Lee Eun-young
14. Jeon Young-sun
15. Kwon Chang-sook
16. Jin Deok-san (GK)
Spain
1. Elena Carrión (GK)
2. Natalia Dorado (c)
3. Nuria Moreno
4. María Carmen Barea
5. Silvia Manrique
6. Nagore Gabellanes
7. Mireia Hernandez
8. Sonia Barrio
9. Mónica Rueda
10. Lucía López
11. María del Mar Feito
12. Maider Tellería
13. Elena Urquizu
14. Begoña Larzabal
15. Sonia de Ignacio
16. Maribel Martinez (GK)
United States

Head Coach: Pam Hixon

1. Patty Shea (GK)
2. Cindy Werley
3. Katie Kauffman
4. Marcia Pankratz
5. Eleanor Stone
6. Diane Madl
7. Kris Fillat
8. Kelli James
9. Tracey Fuchs
10. Antoinette Lucas
11. Pam Neiss
12. Andrea Wieland (GK)
13. Leslie Lyness
14. Barbara Marois (c)
15. Jill Reeve
16. Pamela Bustin

== Results ==
All times are Argentina Time (UTC−03:00)

=== Pool ===
Pos	Team	Pld	W	D	L	GF	GA	GD	Pts	Qualification
1	Australia	5	5	0	0	11	3	+8	10	Final
2	South Korea	5	4	0	1	11	8	+3	8	Final
3	Germany	5	2	1	2	7	8	−1	5	
4	United States	5	1	2	2	5	8	−3	4	
5	Argentina	5	1	1	3	5	7	−2	3	
6	Spain	5	0	0	5	6	11	−5	0	

Source: FIH
Rules for classification: 1) points; 2) goal difference; 3) goals scored; 4) head-to-head result.

9 September 1995
09:30

Germany	1–2	South Korea
Ernsting-Krienke 42'	Report	Cho 52'; Chang 70'

Umpires:
Michele Arnold (AUS)
Christianne Asselman (BEL)

9 September 1995
12:00

United States	0–2	Australia
	Report	Morris 15'; Annan 61'

Umpires:
Laura Crespo (ARG)
Ute Lowenstein (GER)

9 September 1995
15:00

Argentina	2–1	Spain
MacKenzie 26'; Castelli 32'	Report	Dorado 33'

Umpires:
Miriam van Gemert (NED)
Janice MacDonald (SCO)

10 September 1995
11:00

Australia	2–0	Germany
Andrews 40', 46'	Report

Umpires:
Renee Cohen (NED)
Kazuko Yasueda (JPN)

10 September 1995
13:30

South Korea	2–1	Spain
Lee Eun-Y. 8'; Lee J. 17'	Report	Barea 39'

Umpires:
Jean Buchanan (USA)
Laura Crespo (ARG)

10 September 1995
16:00

United States	0–0	Argentina
	Report

Umpires:
Janice MacDonald (SCO)
Michele Arnold (AUS)

12 September 1995
13:30

Spain	0–1	Australia
	Report	Annan 37'

Umpires:
Christianne Asselman (BEL)
Ute Lowenstein (GER)

12 September 1995
16:00

Argentina	1–2	South Korea
MacKenzie 52'	Report	Chang 12'; Lee Eun-K. 25'

Umpires:
Kazuko Yasueda (JPN)
Miriam van Gemert (NED)

13 September 1995
13:30

Germany	1–1	United States
Hentschel 12'	Report	Werley 65'

Umpires:
Jean Buchanan (RSA)
Michele Arnold (AUS)

13 September 1995
16:00

Australia	4–2	South Korea
Morris 43'; Pereira 45', 59'; Andrews 70'	Report	Lee J. 18'; Cho 35'

Umpires:
Renee Cohen (NED)
Janice MacDonald (SCO)

14 September 1995
13:30

United States	3–2	Spain
James 15'; Fuchs 30'; Madl 50'	Report	Tellería 49', 70'

Umpires:
Kazuko Yasueda (JPN)
Laura Crespo (ARG)

14 September 1995
16:00

Germany	2–1	Argentina
Ernsting-Krienke 35'; Dickenscheid 70'	Report	Oneto 10'

Umpires:
Christianne Asselman (BEL)
Jean Buchanan (RSA)

16 September 1995
09:30

Spain	2–3	Germany
Dorado 41'; Feito 63'	Report	Ernsting-Krienke 11'; Hentschel 37'; Keller 49'

Umpires:
Michele Arnold (AUS)
Miriam van Gemert (NED)

16 September 1995
12:00

South Korea	3–1	United States
Lee J. 8'; Kwon C. 28'; Cho 68'	Report	Marois 50'

Umpires:
Renee Cohen (NED)
Ute Lowenstein (GER)

16 September 1995
14:30

Argentina	1–2	Australia
Masotta 24'	Report	Farrell 48'; Pereira 69'

Umpires:
Christianne Asselman (BEL)
Janice MacDonald (SCO)

=== Classification ===
==== Fifth and sixth place ====
17 September 1995
16:00

Argentina	1–2	Spain
Oneto 40'	Report	Barea 29', 68'

Umpires:
Renee Cohen (NED)
Ute Lowenstein (GER)

==== Third and fourth place ====
17 September 1995
13:30

Germany	0–0	United States
	Report
Penalties
Becker (penalty shoot-out missed); Kauschke (penalty shoot-out missed); Hentschel (penalty shoot-out scored)	1−4	(penalty shoot-out scored) Fuchs; (penalty shoot-out scored) Lyness; (penalty shoot-out scored) Lucas; (penalty shoot-out scored) Fillat

Umpires:
Jean Buchanan (USA)
Kazuko Yasueda (JPN)

==== Final ====
17 September 1995
16:00

Australia	1–1	South Korea
Andrews 7'	Report	Cho 13'
Penalties
Morris (penalty shoot-out scored); Andrews (penalty shoot-out scored); Annan (penalty shoot-out scored); Starre (penalty shoot-out missed); Haslam (penalty shoot-out scored)	4−3	(penalty shoot-out missed) Cho; (penalty shoot-out scored) Kwon S. (penalty shoot-out scored) Oh; (penalty shoot-out missed) Kim; (penalty shoot-out scored) Lee J.

Umpires:
Laura Crespo (ARG)
Miriam van Gemert (NED)

== Statistics ==
=== Final standings ===
1. Australia
2. South Korea
3. United States
4. Germany
5. Spain
6. Argentina

=== Goalscorers ===
There were 50 goals scored in 18 matches, for an average of 2.78 goals per match.

4 goals

- (Australia) Michelle Andrews
- (South Korea) Cho Eun-Jung

3 goals

- (Australia) Jacqui Pereira
- (Germany) Nadine Ernsting-Krienke
- (South Korea) Lee Ji-Young
- (Spain) María Carmen Barea

2 goals

- (Argentina) Sofía MacKenzie
- (Argentina) Vanina Oneto
- (Australia) Alyson Annan
- (Australia) Jenn Morris
- (Germany) Franziska Hentschel
- (South Korea) Chang Eun-Jung
- (Spain) Natalia Dorado
- (Spain) Maider Tellería

1 goal

- (Argentina) María Castelli
- (Argentina) Karina Masotta
- (Australia) Renita Farrell
- (Germany) Tanja Dickenscheid
- (Germany) Natascha Keller
- (South Korea) Kwon Chang-Sook
- (South Korea) Lee Eun-Young
- (South Korea) Lee Eun-Kyung
- (Spain) María del Mar Feito
- (United States) Tracey Fuchs
- (United States) Kelli James
- (United States) Diane Madl
- (United States) Barbara Marois
- (United States) Cindy Werley

Source: FIH
