= 1991 Women's Hockey Champions Trophy =

International hockey tournament in Berlin

Tournament details
- Host country: Germany
- City: Berlin
- Dates: 13–21 September
- Teams: 6

Final positions
- Champions: Australia (1st title)
- Runner-up: Germany
- Third place: Netherlands

Tournament statistics
- Matches played: 15
- Goals scored: 45 (3 per match)
- Top scorer: (Germany) Franziska Hentschel (4 goals)

The 1991 Women's Hockey Champions Trophy was the third edition of the Hockey Champions Trophy for women. The tournament took place from September 13 to September 21, 1991, in the Olympiastadion in Berlin, Germany.

Australia won the tournament for the first time, finishing atop the pool standings, above Germany and Netherlands who finished second and third respectively.

== Participating nations ==
Australia

Head coach: Brian Glencross

1. Kathleen Partridge (GK)
2. Debbie Callaghan
3. Liane Tooth
4. Loretta Dorman
5. Lisa Naughton (GK)
6. Michelle Hager
7. Alison Peek
8. Lisa Powell
9. Juliet Haslam
10. Kate Starre
11. Sally Bell
12. Jackie Pereira
13. Tracey Belbin
14. Rechelle Hawkes
15. Sharon Buchanan (C)
16. Lee Capes
China

Head coach: Zhang Qingyou

1. Ding Hongping (GK)
2. Wang Yanhong
3. Cai Donghong
4. Yuan Ye
5. Yu Shusheng
6. Wang Yarhong
7. Limai Qin
8. Wu Yanshen
9. Huping Yang
10. Chen Jianbin (C)
11. Yang Hongbing
12. Hinzhu Chen
13. Wei Hua
14. Jingling Zhai
15. Wan Wen
16. Shi Yanhui (GK)
Germany

Head coach: Rüdiger Hänel

1. Susie Wollschläger (GK)
2. Bianca Weiß (GK)
3. Tanja Dickenscheid
4. Susanne Müller
5. Nadine Ernsting-Krienke
6. Simone Thomaschinski
7. Irina Kuhnt
8. Melanie Cremer
9. Franziska Hentschel
10. Tina Peters
11. Anke Wild
12. Britta Becker
13. Caren Jungjohann
14. Vanessa van Kooperen
15. Heike Lätzsch
16. Katrin Kauschke
Netherlands

Head coach: Roelant Oltmans

1. Jacqueline Toxopeus (GK)
2. Carina Bleeker (GK)
3. Caroline Leenders
4. Annemieke Fokke
5. Martine Ohr
6. Carole Thate
7. Carina Benninga (C)
8. Daniëlle Koenen
9. Ingrid Wolff
10. Mieketine Wouters
11. Ingrid Appels
12. Florentine Steenberghe
13. Suzan van der Wielen
14. Helen van der Ben
15. Wietske de Ruiter
16. Jeannette Lewin
South Korea

Head coach: Kim Chang-Baek

1. Kang Kyung-Ok (GK)
2. Yang Hea-Young
3. Sin You-Ri
4. Choi Mi-Soon
5. Cho Eun-Jung
6. Kim Hyun-Young (C)
7. Oh Seung-Shih
8. Kim Myung-Ok
9. Lee Eung-Kyung
10. Yang Dong-Sook
11. Kim Jeon-Mi
12. Lee Ji-Young
13. Lee Kwi-Joo
14. Koo Mun-Young
15. Im Gye-Sook
16. Kim Hyung-Soon (GK)
Spain

Head coach: José Brasa

1. Marívi González (GK)
2. Natalia Dorado
3. Virginia Ramírez
4. María Carmen Barea
5. Silvia Manrique
6. Maider Telleria
7. María Ángeles Rodríguez
8. Sonia Barrio
9. Celia Corres
10. Elisabeth Maragall
11. Teresa Motos
12. Begoña Larzabal
13. Mercedes Coghen (C)
14. Nuria Olivé
15. Inge Michelena
16. María Isabel Martínez (GK)

== Results ==
=== Pool standings ===
Pos	Team	Pld	W	D	L	GF	GA	GD	Pts
1st place, gold medalist(s)	Australia	5	4	1	0	10	4	+6	9
2nd place, silver medalist(s)	Germany	5	3	2	0	9	3	+6	8
3rd place, bronze medalist(s)	Netherlands	5	2	2	1	7	5	+2	6
4	Spain	5	1	1	3	7	12	−5	3
5	China	5	0	2	3	6	9	−3	2
6	South Korea	5	1	0	4	6	12	−6	2

Source: FIH

=== Matches ===
14 September 1991
15:00

Germany	3–0	Spain
Lätzsch 51'; Ernsting-Krienke 53'; Becker 67'	Report

Umpires:
Christine Asselman (BEL)
Peri Buckley (AUS)

15 September 1991
13:00

China	1–2	Australia
Jianbin 63'	Report	Buchanan 6', 56'

Umpires:
Carola Heinrichs (GER)
Laura Crespo (ARG)

15 September 1991
17:00

Netherlands	3–1	South Korea
Wolff 17', 28'; Koenen 53'	Report	Mun Young-Koo 5'

Umpires:
Solabrar Hernandez (ESP)
Sandy Goldthorpe (USA)

16 September 1991
14:00

Germany	2–1	China
Hentschel 29', 63'	Report	Huiping 14'

Umpires:
Miriam van Gemert (NED)
Lee Mi-Ok (KOR)

16 September 1991
17:00

Netherlands	2–0	Spain
Van der Ben 18'; Koenen 55'	Report

Umpires:
Gabi Hans (GER)
Laura Crespo (ARG)

17 September 1991
14:00

Germany	4–2	South Korea
Hentschel 16', 47'; Dickenscheid 57'; Becker 69'	Report	Mun Young-Koo 10'; Lee Ji-Young 44'

Umpires:
Miriam van Gemert (NED)
Peri Buckley (AUS)

17 September 1991
17:00

Australia	4–2	Spain
Tooth 16'; Bell 47'; Pereira 53'; Haslam 58'	Report	Manrique 32'; Barrio 51'

Umpires:
Sandy Goldthorpe (USA)
Christine Asselman (BEL)

18 September 1991
15:00

China	0–1	South Korea
	Report	Lee Eun-Kyung 32'

Umpires:
Gaby Hans (GER)
Solabrar Hernandez (ESP)

18 September 1991
17:00

Australia	2–0	Netherlands
Tooth 13'; Haslam 65'	Report

Umpires:
Carola Heinrichs (GER)
Lee Mi-Ok (KOR)

19 September 1991
17:00

Netherlands	2–2	China
Van der Ben 64', 68'	Report	Huiping 19', 20'

Umpires:
Peri Buckley (AUS)
Carola Heinrichs (GER)

20 September 1991
13:00

Germany	0–0	Australia
	Report

Umpires:
Solabrar Hernandez (ESP)
Laura Crespo (ARG)

20 September 1991
17:00

Spain	3–1	South Korea
Motos 5', 10'; Carmen Barea 15'	Report	Lee Ji-Young 69'

Umpires:
Sandy Goldthorpe (USA)
Miriam van Gemert (NED)

21 September 1991
11:00

Spain	2–2	China
Dorado 30'; Motos 45'	Report	Hongbing 38'; Yanshen 60'

Umpires:
Lee Mi-Ok (KOR)
Gaby Hans (GER)

21 September 1991
15:00

Netherlands	0–0	Germany
	Report

Umpires:
Peri Buckley (AUS)
Christiane Asselman (GER)

21 September 1991
17:00

Australia	2–1	South Korea
Pereira 50'; Hawkes 59'	Report	Dong Sook-Jang 16'

Umpires:
Miriam van Gemert (NED)
Carola Heinrichs (GER)

== Statistics ==
=== Final standings ===
1. Australia
2. Germany
3. Netherlands
4. Spain
5. China
6. South Korea

=== Goalscorers ===
There were 45 goals scored in 15 matches, for an average of 3 goals per match.

4 goals

- (Germany) Franziska Hentschel

3 goals

- (China) Huiping Yang
- (Netherlands) Helen van der Ben
- (Spain) Teresa Motos

2 goals

- (Australia) Sharon Buchanan
- (Australia) Juliet Haslam
- (Australia) Jackie Pereira
- (Australia) Liane Tooth
- (Germany) Britta Becker
- (Netherlands) Daniëlle Koenen
- (Netherlands) Ingrid Wolff
- (South Korea) Lee Ji-Young
- (South Korea) Mun Young-Koo

1 goal

- (Australia) Sally Bell
- (Australia) Rechelle Hawkes
- (China) Jianbin Chen
- (China) Hingbing Yang
- (China) Yanshen Wu
- (Germany) Tanja Dickenscheid
- (Germany) Nadine Ernsting-Krienke
- (Germany) Heike Lätzsch
- (South Korea) Lee Eun-Kyung
- (South Korea) Dong Sook-Jang
- (Spain) Sonia Barrio
- (Spain) María Carmen Barea
- (Spain) Natalia Dorado
- (Spain) Silvia Manrique

Source: FIH
