= 1994 Women's Hockey World Cup =

1994 Hockey World Cup
Tournament details
- Host country: Ireland
- City: Dublin
- Dates: 13–23 July
- Teams: 12
- Venue: University College Dublin

Final positions
- Champions: Australia (1st title)
- Runner-up: Argentina
- Third place: United States

Tournament statistics
- Matches played: 42
- Goals scored: 102 (2.43 per match)
- Top scorer(s): (Australia) Michelle Andrews (South Korea) Jang Dong-Sook (6 goals)

The 1994 Women's Hockey World Cup was the ninth staging of the Women's Hockey World Cup field hockey tournament, held from 13 to 23 July 1994 in Dublin, Ireland. Australia won, defeating Argentina 2–0 in the final. The host team, Ireland, finished 11th.

== Results ==
=== Preliminary round ===
==== Pool A ====
| Pos | Team | Pld | W | D | L | GF | GA | GD | Pts | Qualification |
|---|---|---|---|---|---|---|---|---|---|---|
| 1 | Argentina | 5 | 4 | 0 | 1 | 7 | 3 | +4 | 12 | Semi-finals |
| 2 | Australia | 5 | 3 | 1 | 1 | 13 | 5 | +8 | 10 | Semi-finals |
| 3 | South Korea | 5 | 2 | 1 | 2 | 10 | 8 | +2 | 7 | |
| 4 | Spain | 5 | 1 | 3 | 1 | 8 | 7 | +1 | 6 | |
| 5 | Russia | 5 | 1 | 1 | 3 | 3 | 9 | −6 | 4 | |
| 6 | Ireland | 5 | 0 | 2 | 3 | 1 | 10 | −9 | 2 | |

Source: FIH
Rules for classification: 1) points; 2) goal difference; 3) goals scored; 4) head-to-head result.

13 July 1994
10:00

| Russia | 2–1 | Australia |
|---|---|---|
| Shutova 9'; Dobrokhotova 63' | Report | Andrews 14' |

Umpires:
Dominique Ache (BEL)
Carola Heinrichs (GER)

13 July 1994
12:00

| Ireland | 0–3 | Argentina |
|---|---|---|
| | Report | Castelli 24'; Oneto 27', 68' |

Umpires:
Miriam van Gemert (NED)
Hu You-fang (CHN)

13 July 1994
14:00

| Spain | 3–3 | South Korea |
|---|---|---|
| De Ignacio 26'; Dorado 39'; Gabellanes 40' | Report | Jang 19', 49'; Kwon C. 58' |

Umpires:
Renee Chatas (USA)
Gill Clarke (ENG)

14 July 1994
15:00

| Russia | 0–4 | South Korea |
|---|---|---|
| | Report | Cho 23'; Jang 27', 46', 52' |

Umpires:
Renee Chatas (USA)
Naomi Kato (JPN)

14 July 1994
17:00

| Argentina | 1–3 | Australia |
|---|---|---|
| Masotta 57' | Report | Andrews 8'; Morris 11', 29' |

Umpires:
Miriam van Gemert (NED)
Gill Clarke (ENG)

15 July 1994
10:00

| Spain | 1–1 | Ireland |
|---|---|---|
| López 65' | Report | Kelleher 61' |

Umpires:
Carola Heinrichs (GER)
Hu You-fang (CHN)

16 July 1994
11:00

| Argentina | 1–0 | Russia |
|---|---|---|
| Oneto 17' | Report |

Umpires:
Gill Clarke (ENG)
Miriam van Gemert (NED)

16 July 1994
14:00

| South Korea | 2–0 | Ireland |
|---|---|---|
| Jang 3'; Cho 53' | Report |

Umpires:
Carola Heinrichs (GER)
Gina Spitaleri (ITA)

16 July 1994
16:00

| Australia | 1–1 | Spain |
|---|---|---|
| Morris 15' | Report | Hernández 62' |

Umpires:
Dominique Ache (BEL)
Renee Chatas (USA)

18 July 1994
10:00

| South Korea | 0–1 | Argentina |
|---|---|---|
| | Report | MacKenzie 53' |

Umpires:
Carola Heinrichs (GER)
Janice MacDonald (SCO)

18 July 1994
12:00

| Spain | 3–1 | Russia |
|---|---|---|
| López 4'; Gabellanes 7', 69' | Report | Sedova 67' |

Umpires:
Hu You-fang (CHN)
Gill Clarke (ENG)

18 July 1994
15:00

| Australia | 4–0 | Ireland |
|---|---|---|
| Carbon 26'; Starre 40'; Andrews 49'; Annan 66' | Report |

Umpires:
Renee Chatas (USA)
Miriam van Gemert (NED)

19 July 1994
15:00

| Ireland | 0–0 | Russia |
|---|---|---|
| | Report |

Umpires:
Carola Heinrichs (GER)
Miriam van Gemert (NED)

19 July 1994
17:00

| Argentina | 1–0 | Spain |
|---|---|---|
| MacKenzie 16' | Report |

Umpires:
Renee Chatas (USA)
Gill Clarke (ENG)

20 July 1994
10:00

| Australia | 4–1 | South Korea |
|---|---|---|
| Powell 8', 16'; Annan 12'; Andrews 68' | Report | Cho 46' |

Umpires:
Renee Chatas (USA)
Gill Clarke (ENG)

==== Pool B ====
| Pos | Team | Pld | W | D | L | GF | GA | GD | Pts | Qualification |
|---|---|---|---|---|---|---|---|---|---|---|
| 1 | Germany | 5 | 3 | 1 | 1 | 9 | 4 | +5 | 10 | Semi-finals |
| 2 | United States | 5 | 3 | 1 | 1 | 5 | 3 | +2 | 10 | Semi-finals |
| 3 | Netherlands | 5 | 3 | 0 | 2 | 7 | 4 | +3 | 9 | |
| 4 | China | 5 | 2 | 1 | 2 | 4 | 3 | +1 | 7 | |
| 5 | England | 5 | 1 | 1 | 3 | 3 | 5 | −2 | 4 | |
| 6 | Canada | 5 | 1 | 0 | 4 | 1 | 10 | −9 | 3 | |

Source: FIH
Rules for classification: 1) points; 2) goal difference; 3) goals scored; 4) head-to-head result.

13 July 1994
17:00

| Canada | 0–2 | Germany |
|---|---|---|
| | Report | Hentschel 29', 60' |

Umpires:
Peri Buckley (AUS)
Janice MacDonald (SCO)

14 July 1994
10:00

| Netherlands | 1–0 | China |
|---|---|---|
| De Ruiter 51' | Report |

Umpires:
Peri Buckley (AUS)
Ann Murray (IRE)

14 July 1994
12:00

| England | 0–1 | United States |
|---|---|---|
| | Report | Marois 59' |

Umpires:
Laura Crespo (ARG)
Gina Spitaleri (ITA)

15 July 1994
12:00

| China | 0–0 | England |
|---|---|---|
| | Report |

Umpires:
Dominique Ache (BEL)
Janice MacDonald (SCO)

15 July 1994
15:00

| United States | 1–1 | Germany |
|---|---|---|
| James 48' | Report | Hentschel 34' |

Umpires:
Laura Crespo (ARG)
Ann Murray (IRE)

15 July 1994
17:00

| Canada | 0–3 | Netherlands |
|---|---|---|
| | Report | Smabers 2'; Appels 40'; De Ruiter 66' |

Umpires:
Gina Spitaleri (ITA)
Naomi Kato (JPN)

17 July 1994
11:00

| Germany | 3–0 | England |
|---|---|---|
| Ernsting-Krienke 15'; Lätzsch 62'; Hentschel 70' | Report |

Umpires:
Laura Crespo (ARG)
Naomi Kato (JPN)

17 July 1994
14:00

| China | 2–0 | Canada |
|---|---|---|
| Donghong 18'; Ying 42' | Report |

Umpires:
Peri Buckley (AUS)
Janice MacDonald (SCO)

17 July 1994
16:00

| Netherlands | 1–2 | United States |
|---|---|---|
| Kuipers 8' | Report | Lyness 11'; Pankratz 31' |

Umpires:
Dominique Ache (BEL)
Gina Spitaleri (ITA)

18 July 1994
17:00

| Canada | 1–0 | United States |
|---|---|---|
| Kopeck 9' | Report |

Umpires:
Laura Crespo (ARG)
Naomi Kato (JPN)

19 July 1994
10:00

| Germany | 1–2 | China |
|---|---|---|
| Kuhnt 46' | Report | Donghong 52'; Chen 61' |

Umpires:
Ann Murray (IRE)
Dominique Ache (BEL)

19 July 1994
12:00

| Netherlands | 1–0 | England |
|---|---|---|
| Lewin 58' | Report |

Umpires:
Peri Buckley (AUS)
Gina Spitaleri (ITA)

20 July 1994
12:00

| England | 3–0 | Canada |
|---|---|---|
| Johnson 3'; Miller 11'; Sixsmith 31' | Report |

Umpires:
Miriam van Gemert (NED)
Carola Heinrichs (GER)

20 July 1994
15:00

| China | 0–1 | United States |
|---|---|---|
| | Report | Lyness 40' |

Umpires:
Gina Spitaleri (ITA)
Naomi Kato (JPN)

20 July 1994
17:00

| Netherlands | 1–2 | Germany |
|---|---|---|
| Donners 32' | Report | Cremer 5'; Becker 7' |

Umpires:
Dominique Ache (BEL)
Peri Buckley (AUS)

=== Classification round ===
==== Ninth to twelfth place classification ====
Crossover
23 July 1994
Russia | 1 (2)
Canada (p.s.o) | 1 (4)
23 July 1994
Ireland | 1 (0)
England (p.s.o) | 1 (2)

Ninth place
24 July 1994
Canada | 0
England | 1
Eleventh place
24 July 1994
Russia | 2
Ireland | 3

===== Crossover =====
23 July 1994
08:00

| Russia | 1–1 | Canada |
|---|---|---|
| Kravtchenko 35' | Report | Low 18' |
Penalties
| | 2–4 |

Umpires:
Renee Chatas (USA)
Naomi Kato (JPN)

23 July 1994
10:30

| Ireland | 1–1 | England |
|---|---|---|
| McVicker 26' | Report | Atkins 19' |
Penalties
| | 0–2 |

Umpires:
Carola Heinrichs (GER)
Laura Crespo (ARG)

===== Eleventh and twelfth place =====
24 July 1994
08:00

| Russia | 2–3 | Ireland |
|---|---|---|
| Polovkova 3'; Piskunuva 40' | Report | Kelleher 22', 31'; Turner 42' |

Umpires:
Hu You-fang (CHN)
Laura Crespo (ARG)

===== Ninth and tenth place =====
24 July 1994
10:30

| Canada | 0–1 | England |
|---|---|---|
| | Report | Atkins 33' |

Umpires:
Janice MacDonald (SCO)
Naomi Kato (JPN)

==== Fifth to eighth place classification ====
Crossover
22 July 1994
South Korea | 4
China | 1
22 July 1994
Spain | 0
Netherlands | 2

Fifth place
23 July 1994
South Korea | 2
Netherlands | 0
Seventh place
23 July 1994
China | 2
Spain | 1

===== Crossover =====
22 July 1994
09:00

| South Korea | 4–1 | China |
|---|---|---|
| Ro 25'; Lee J. 30', 44', 56' | Report | Donghong 13' |

Umpires:
Laura Crespo (ARG)
Peri Buckley (AUS)

22 July 1994
11:30

| Spain | 0–2 | Netherlands |
|---|---|---|
| | Report | Kuipers 8'; Grijpma 23' |

Umpires:
Gill Clarke (ENG)
Renee Chatas (USA)

===== Seventh and eighth place =====
23 July 1994
16:00

| China | 2–1 | Spain |
|---|---|---|
| Donghong 9'; Shuzen 65' | Report | Dorado 5' |

Umpires:
Ann Murray (IRE)
Janice MacDonald (SCO)

===== Fifth and sixth place =====
23 July 1994
13:30

| South Korea | 2–0 | Netherlands |
|---|---|---|
| Chang 43'; Lee J. 45' | Report |

Umpires:
Peri Buckley (AUS)
Hu You-fang (CHN)

==== First to fourth place classification ====
Semi-finals
22 July 1994
Argentina | 2
United States | 0
22 July 1994
Germany | 0
Australia | 2

Final
24 July 1994
Argentina | 0
Australia | 2
Third place
23 July 1994
United States | 2
Germany | 1

===== Semi-finals =====
22 July 1994
14:30

| Argentina | 2–0 | United States |
|---|---|---|
| Masotta 47'; Oneto 65' | Report |

Umpires:
Janice MacDonald (SCO)
Gina Spitaleri (ITA)

22 July 1994
17:00

| Germany | 0–2 | Australia |
|---|---|---|
| | Report | Farrell 10'; Andrews 64' |

Umpires:
Dominique Ache (BEL)
Miriam van Gemert (NED)

===== Third and fourth place =====
23 July 1994
13:30

| United States | 2–1 | Germany |
|---|---|---|
| Fuchs 14'; Marois 27' | Report | Lätzsch 31' |

Umpires:
Dominique Ache (BEL)
Gina Spitaleri (ITA)

===== Final =====
24 July 1994
16:00

| Argentina | 0–2 | Australia |
|---|---|---|
| | Report | Andrews 53'; Pereira 54' |

Umpires:
Gill Clarke (ENG)
Miriam van Gemert (NED)

== Statistics ==
=== Final standings ===
| Pos | Grp | Team | Pld | W | D | L | GF | GA | GD | Pts | Final result |
|---|---|---|---|---|---|---|---|---|---|---|---|
| 1 | A | Australia | 7 | 5 | 1 | 1 | 17 | 5 | +12 | 16 | Gold medal |
| 2 | A | Argentina | 7 | 5 | 0 | 2 | 9 | 5 | +4 | 15 | Silver medal |
| 3 | B | United States | 7 | 4 | 1 | 2 | 7 | 6 | +1 | 13 | Bronze medal |
| 4 | B | Germany | 7 | 3 | 1 | 3 | 10 | 8 | +2 | 10 | Fourth place |
| 5 | A | South Korea | 7 | 4 | 1 | 2 | 16 | 9 | +7 | 13 | Eliminated in group stage |
| 6 | B | Netherlands | 7 | 4 | 0 | 3 | 9 | 6 | +3 | 12 | Eliminated in group stage |
| 7 | B | China | 7 | 3 | 1 | 3 | 7 | 8 | −1 | 10 | Eliminated in group stage |
| 8 | A | Spain | 7 | 1 | 3 | 3 | 9 | 11 | −2 | 6 | Eliminated in group stage |
| 9 | B | England | 7 | 2 | 2 | 3 | 5 | 6 | −1 | 8 | Eliminated in group stage |
| 10 | B | Canada | 5 | 1 | 1 | 3 | 2 | 12 | −10 | 4 | Eliminated in group stage |
| 11 | A | Ireland | 7 | 1 | 3 | 3 | 5 | 13 | −8 | 6 | Eliminated in group stage |
| 12 | A | Russia | 7 | 1 | 2 | 4 | 6 | 13 | −7 | 5 | Eliminated in group stage |

Source: FIH

=== Goalscorers ===
There were 102 goals scored in 42 matches, for an average of 2.43 goals per match.

6 goals

- (Australia) Michelle Andrews
- (South Korea) Jang Dong-Sook

4 goals

- (Argentina) Vanina Oneto
- (China) Donghong Cai
- (Germany) Franziska Hentschel
- (South Korea) Lee Ji-Young

3 goals

- (Australia) Jenn Morris
- (Ireland) Sarah Kelleher
- (South Korea) Cho Eun-Jung
- (Spain) Nagore Gabellanes

2 goals

- (Argentina) Sofía MacKenzie
- (Argentina) Karina Masotta
- (Australia) Alyson Annan
- (Australia) Lisa Powell
- (England) Jill Atkins
- (Germany) Heike Lätzsch
- (Netherlands) Wietske de Ruiter
- (Netherlands) Ellen Kuipers
- (Spain) Natalia Dorado
- (Spain) Lucía López
- (United States) Leslie Lyness
- (United States) Barbara Marois

1 goal

- (Argentina) María Castelli
- (Australia) Sally Carbon
- (Australia) Renita Farrell
- (Australia) Jacqui Pereira
- (Australia) Kate Starre
- (Canada) Laurelee Kopeck
- (Canada) Rochelle Low
- (China) Chen Jianbin
- (China) Ying Liu
- (China) Shuzen Yu
- (England) Kathryn Johnson
- (England) Tammy Miller
- (England) Jane Sixsmith
- (Germany) Britta Becker
- (Germany) Melanie Cremer
- (Germany) Nadine Ernsting-Krienke
- (Germany) Irina Kuhnt
- (Ireland) Lynsey McVicker
- (Ireland) Jeanette Turner
- (Netherlands) Ingrid Appels
- (Netherlands) Mijntje Donners
- (Netherlands) Frederiek Grijpma
- (Netherlands) Jeannette Lewin
- (Netherlands) Hanneke Smabers
- (Russia) Natalia Dobrokhotova
- (Russia) Natalie Kravtchenko
- (Russia) Irina Piskunuva
- (Russia) Elena Polovkova
- (Russia) Natalia Sedova
- (Russia) Ludmila Shutova
- (South Korea) Kwon Chang-Sook
- (South Korea) Ro Young-Mi
- (South Korea) Chang Eun-Jung
- (Spain) Sonia de Ignacio
- (Spain) Mireia Hernández
- (United States) Tracey Fuchs
- (United States) Kelli James
- (United States) Marcia Pankratz

Source: FIH
