= Sweden national hockey team =

Sweden national hockey team may refer to:

- Sweden men's national field hockey team
- Sweden women's national field hockey team
- Sweden men's national ice hockey team
- Sweden women's national ice hockey team
- Sweden men's national inline hockey team
