= Tammy Miller =

Tammy Miller may refer to:

- Tammy Miller (field hockey) (born 1967), British field hockey player
- Tammy Miller (politician) (born 1960), American politician
