= Heike Lätzsch =

German field hockey player (born 1973)

Personal information
- Born: 19 December 1973 (age 52) Braunschweig, Lower; Saxony, West Germany

Sport
- Sport: Field hockey
- Position: Striker
Senior career
Years	Team	Caps	Goals
–	Braunschweiger THC	-	-
–1993	Eintracht Braunschweig	-	-
1993–1998	RTHC Bayer Leverkusen	-	-
1998–	Rot-Weiss Köln	-	-
National team
Years	Team	Caps	Goals
1990–2004	Germany	250	(41)
Medal record
Women's field hockey
Representing Germany
Olympic Games
Gold medal – first place	2004 Athens	Team competition
Silver medal – second place	1992 Barcelona	Team competition
World Cup
Bronze medal – third place	1998 Utrecht	Team Competition
Champions Trophy
Silver medal – second place	1991 Berlin	Team Competition
Silver medal – second place	1997 Berlin	Team Competition
Silver medal – second place	2000 Amstelveen	Team Competition
Bronze medal – third place	1993 Amstelveen	Team competition
Bronze medal – third place	1999 Brisbane	Team Competition
European Nations Cup
Silver medal – second place	1999 Cologne	Team Competition
Bronze medal – third place	1995 Amstelveen	Team Competition

Heike Wedekind (née Lätzsch, born 19 December 1973 in Braunschweig, Lower Saxony) is a former field hockey striker from Germany, who won the gold medal with the Women's National Team at the 2004 Summer Olympics in Athens, Greece.

She made her international debut in 1990 at the age of sixteen at the World Cup in Sydney, Australia. After having played in four consecutive Summer Olympics, starting in 1992, Lätzsch retired in 2004, after the Athens Games. In total, she represented Germany in 250 matches.

She is a fully qualified lawyer and a certified data protection officer, and currently works as a data protection consultant and lead of the Cologne office of the company datenschutz süd GmbH.

== International senior tournaments ==
- 1990 – World Cup, Sydney (8th place)
- 1991 – European Nations Cup, Brussels (2nd place)
- 1992 – Summer Olympics, Barcelona (2nd place)
- 1994 – World Cup, Dublin (4th place)
- 1995 – European Nations Cup, Amstelveen (3rd place)
- 1995 – Champions Trophy, Mar del Plata (4th place)
- 1995 – Olympic Qualifying Tournament, Cape Town (3rd place)
- 1996 – Summer Olympics, Atlanta (6th place)
- 1997 – Champions Trophy, Berlin (2nd place)
- 1998 – World Cup, Utrecht (3rd place)
- 1999 – Champions Trophy, Brisbane (3rd place)
- 1999 – European Nations Cup, Cologne (2nd place)
- 2000 – Olympic Qualifying Tournament, Milton Keynes (3rd place)
- 2000 – Champions Trophy, Amstelveen (2nd place)
- 2000 – Summer Olympics, Sydney (7th place)
- 2002 – World Cup, Perth (7th place)
- 2004 – Olympic Qualifier, Auckland (4th place)
- 2004 – Summer Olympics, Athens (1st place)
