= Kris Fillat =

American field hockey player

Medal record

Women's field hockey

Representing the United States

Champions Trophy
Bronze medal – third place	1995 Mar del Plata	Team competition

Pan American Games
Bronze medal – third place	1991 Havana	Team competition
Silver medal – second place	1995 Mar del Plata	Team competition
Silver medal – second place	1999 Winnipeg	Team competition

Kris Fillat (Buchanan) (born November 7, 1970, in San Diego, California) is a former field hockey player from the United States, who made her international senior debut for the Women's National Team in 1990. She was a member of the team that finished fifth at the 1996 Summer Olympics in Atlanta, Georgia. She won a bronze medal at the 1995 Pan American Games.

== Life ==
She was a student at the University of Iowa, where she played for the Hawkeyes, as a forward.

She is the founder of the brand GoodOnYa which includes GoodOnYa deli, GoodOnYa bar and GoodOnYa hydrate.

== International senior tournaments ==
- 1990 – World Cup, Sydney, Australia (12th)
- 1991 – Pan American Games, Havana, Cuba (3rd)
- 1994 – World Cup, Dublin, Ireland (3rd)
- 1995 – Pan American Games, Mar del Plata, Argentina (2nd)
- 1995 – Champions Trophy, Mar del Plata, Argentina (3rd)
- 1996 – Summer Olympics, Atlanta, United States (5th)
- 1998 – World Cup, Utrecht, The Netherlands (8th)
- 1999 – Pan American Games, Winnipeg, Canada (2nd)
- 2000 – Olympic Qualifying Tournament, Milton Keynes, England (6th)
