= Field hockey at the 1996 Summer Olympics =

Field hockey at the Games of the XXVI Olympiad
- Venue: Morris Brown College
- Dates: 20 July – 2 August 1996

The Olympic field hockey tournament at the 1996 Summer Olympics in Atlanta, United States, was held in Herndon Stadium and Panther Stadium from July 20 to August 2, 1996.

== Men's tournament ==
Gold	Silver	Bronze
Netherlands; Jacques Brinkman; Floris Jan Bovelander; Maurits Crucq; Marc Delissen; Jeroen Delmee; Taco van den Honert; Erik Jazet; Ronald Jansen; Leo Klein Gebbink; Bram Lomans; Teun de Nooijer; Wouter van Pelt; Stephan Veen; Guus Vogels; Tycho van Meer; Remco van Wijk	Spain; Jaume Amat; Pol Amat; Javier Arnau; Jordi Arnau; Óscar Barrena; Ignacio Cobos; Juan Dinarés; Juan Escarré; Xavier Escudé; Juantxo García-Mauriño; Antonio González; Ramón Jufresa; Joaquim Malgosa; Victor Pujol; Ramón Sala; Pablo Usoz	Australia; Mark Hager; Stephen Davies; Baeden Choppy; Lachlan Elmer; Stuart Carruthers; Grant Smith; Damon Diletti; Lachlan Dreher; Brendan Garard; Paul Gaudoin; Paul Lewis; Matthew Smith; Jay Stacy; Daniel Sproule; Ken Wark; Michael York

== Women's tournament ==
Gold	Silver	Bronze
Australia; Michelle Andrews; Alyson Annan; Louise Dobson; Renita Farrell; Juliet Haslam; Rechelle Hawkes; Clover Maitland; Karen Marsden; Jenn Morris; Nova Peris-Kneebone; Jackie Pereira; Katrina Powell; Lisa Powell; Danielle Roche; Kate Starre; Liane Tooth	South Korea; Chang Eun-Jung; Cho Eun-Jung; Choi Eun-Kyung; Choi Mi-Soon; Jeon Young-Sun; Jin Deok-San; Kim Myung-Ok; Kwon Soo-Hyun; Kwon Chang-Sook; Lee Eun-Kyung; Lee Eun-Young; Lee Ji-Young; Lim Jeong-Sook; Oh Seung-Shin; Woo Hyun-Jung; You Jae-Sook	Netherlands; Suzanne Plesman; Dillianne van den Boogaard; Florentine Steenberghe; Willemijn Duyster; Mijntje Donners; Fleur van de Kieft; Nicole Koolen; Jeannette Lewin; Wietske de Ruiter; Ellen Kuipers; Margje Teeuwen; Carole Thate; Jacqueline Toxopeus; Stella de Heij; Noor Holsboer; Suzan van der Wielen
