= Jill Reeve =

American field hockey player

Personal information
- Born: November 1, 1969 (age 57)
Medal record
Women's field hockey
Representing the United States
Champions Trophy
Bronze medal – third place	1995 Mar del Plata	Team competition
Pan American Games
Silver medal – second place	1995 Mar del Plata	Team competition
Silver medal – second place	1999 Winnipeg	Team competition

Jill Reeve (born November 1, 1969, in Hoosick Falls, New York) is a former field hockey defender from the United States, who earned a total number of 134 caps for the Women's National Team, in which she scored eight goals.

== International senior tournaments ==
- 1994 – World Cup, Dublin, Ireland (3rd)
- 1995 – Pan American Games, Mar del Plata, Argentina (2nd)
- 1995 – Champions Trophy, Mar del Plata, Argentina (3rd)
- 1996 – Summer Olympics, Atlanta, US (5th)
- 1997 – Champions Trophy, Berlin, Germany (6th)
- 1998 – World Cup, Utrecht, The Netherlands (8th)
- 1999 – Pan American Games, Winnipeg, Canada (2nd)
- 2000 – Olympic Qualifying Tournament, Milton Keynes, England (6th)
- 2001 – Pan America Cup, Kingston, Jamaica (2nd)
- 2002 – Champions Challenge, Johannesburg, South Africa (5th)
- 2002 – USA vs India WC Qualifying Series, Cannock, England (1st)
- 2002 – World Cup, Perth, Australia (9th)
- 2003 – Champions Challenge, Catania, Italy (5th)
