= Katie Allen (field hockey) =

Australian field hockey player

Personal information
- Full name: Kate Ruth Allen
- Born: 28 February 1974 (age 52) Adelaide, South Australia
- Height: 170 cm (5 ft 7 in)
- Weight: 65 kg (143 lb)
Medal record
Women's field hockey
Representing Australia
Olympic Games
Gold medal – first place	2000 Sydney	Team
World Cup
Gold medal – first place	1994 Dublin	Team
Gold medal – first place	1998 Utrecht	Team
Commonwealth Games
Gold medal – first place	1998 Kuala Lumpur	Team
Champions Trophy
Gold medal – first place	1995 Mar del Plata	Team
Gold medal – first place	1997 Berlin	Team
Gold medal – first place	2003 Sydney	Team
- Updated on 10 January 2017

Kate Ruth "Katie" Allen OAM (born 28 February 1974) is an Australian field hockey player. She was a member of the Australia women's national field hockey team that won gold medals at Commonwealth Games, Olympic Games and World Cup in the late 1990s and early 2000s. She is a past FIH World Player of the Year.

She won a gold medal at the 2000 Summer Olympics in Sydney.

== Personal ==
Allen was born in Adelaide.

== Field hockey - playing ==
=== Club hockey ===
Allen played for Burnside Hockey Club in South Australia as a junior.

=== State hockey ===
Allen was a member of the SA Suns team in the Australian Hockey League. She helped the SA Suns win the Australian Hockey League title in 1995.

=== International hockey ===
Allen played international hockey for the Australia women's national field hockey team (Hockeyroos), including the Commonwealth Games, Olympic Games and World Cup.

Following are the tournaments that Allen was part of:

- 1994 Women's Hockey World Cup (Dublin) - 1st GOLD
- 1995 Women's Hockey Champions Trophy (Mar del Plata) - 1st GOLD
- 1997 Women's Hockey Champions Trophy (Berlin) - 1st GOLD
- 1998 Women's Hockey World Cup (Utrecht) - 1st GOLD
- 1998 Commonwealth Games (Kuala Lumpur) - 1st GOLD
- 2000 Summer Olympics (Sydney) - 1st GOLD
- 2003 Women's Hockey Champions Trophy (Sydney) - 1st GOLD
- 2004 Summer Olympics (Athens) - 5th

In 2005 Allen was co-winner of the Women's FIH Player of the Year Awards.

== Field hockey - coaching ==
Following her playing career Allen was the head coach of the Victorian Institute of Sport Hockey Program from 2009 to 2016.

In 2013 Allen was assistant coach of the Victorian Vipers in the Australian Hockey League.

In 2016 she was the Assistant Coach for the Australian Women’s junior team, the Jillaroos, who came third in the Junior World Cup in Chile medalling for the first time in 15 years in the competition.

Allen is the coach of the Camberwell Men's Premier League team in the Victorian Premier League Competition, becoming the first woman to coach a Men's Premier League team in Victoria.

== Recognition ==
As a member of the 2000 Sydney Olympic Games gold medal winning Hockeyroos, Allen was named in the Australian Women's 'Team of the Century' at the 2013 ‘Centenary of Canberra Sportswomen’s Ball’ conducted at The Great Hall, Parliament House in Canberra.

The perpetual shield for Hockey SA's U15 Girls State Junior Zone Championship is named after Allen.
