= Katie Kauffman =

American field hockey player

Katie Kauffman Beach
- Born: Katie Kauffman; September 26, 1974 (age 51); Reading, Pennsylvania, United States
- Education: University of Maryland, College Park
- Occupations: Field hockey player and coach
- Known for: Inducted into the United States Field Hockey Hall of Fame (2014)
- Spouse: Keith Beach

Katie Kauffman Beach (born September 26, 1974, in Reading, Pennsylvania) is an American field hockey player and coach. Nicknamed KK, K2 or Beach, she is best known as a midfielder who played for the United States Women's National Team in 180 international games, including the 1996 Olympics in Atlanta.

She was chosen as the U.S. Field Hockey athlete of the year in 2000. She was inducted into the United States Field Hockey Hall of Fame in 2014.

== Biography ==
Born in Reading, Pennsylvania on September 26, 1974, Beach was raised in West Lawn. After graduating from Wilson High School in 1992, she attended the University of Maryland. While there, she studied marketing and played for the Terrapins, beginning in 1993, the year that the Terrapins won the NCAA championship. She was a two-time All-American, and two-time U.S. Field Hockey Athlete of the Year.

In 2004, Beach retired from the national team to take a job with Columbia University, where she served for four years as head coach. In 2009, she moved to Chicago and became the director and co-owner of Windy City Field Hockey, with husband Keith Beach.

Beach was inducted into the USA Field Hockey Hall of Fame in 2014.

== International senior tournaments ==
- 1995 – Champions Trophy, Mar del Plata, Argentina (3rd)
- 1996 – Summer Olympics, Atlanta, USA (5th)
- 1997 – Champions Trophy, Berlin, Germany (6th)
- 1998 – World Cup, Utrecht, The Netherlands (8th)
- 1999 – Pan American Games, Winnipeg, Canada (2nd)
- 2000 – Olympic Qualifying Tournament, Milton Keynes, England (6th)
- 2001 – Pan America Cup, Kingston, Jamaica (2nd)
- 2002 – Champions Challenge, Johannesburg, South Africa (5th)
- 2002 – USA vs India WC Qualifying Series, Cannock, England (1st)
- 2002 – World Cup, Perth, Australia (9th)
- 2003 – Pan American Games, Santo Domingo, Dominican Republic (2nd)
- 2004 – Olympic Qualifying Tournament, Auckland, New Zealand (6th)
- 2004 – Pan America Cup, Bridgetown, Barbados (2nd)
