= Kelli James =

American field hockey player

Medal record

Women's field hockey

Representing the United States

Champions Trophy
Bronze medal – third place	1995 Mar del Plata	Team Competition

Pan American Games
Bronze medal – third place	1991 Havana	Team competition
Silver medal – second place	1995 Mar del Plata	Team competition
Silver medal – second place	1999 Winnipeg	Team competition

Kelli L. James (born March 16, 1970) is a former field hockey striker from the United States, who earned a total number of 144 caps for the Women's National Team. The former student of the Old Dominion University tied for team scoring lead at the 1999 Pan American Games with 3 goals, and scored four goals in a single match in 4–0 win over China at the 1998 World Cup in Utrecht, Netherlands. She won a bronze medal at the 1995 Pan American Games.

== Life ==
James grew up in Medford, New Jersey and attended Bishop Eustace Preparatory School.

== College ==
In 1993, while at Old Dominion, James won the Honda Award (now the Honda Sports Award) as the nation's best field hockey player.

== International senior tournaments ==
- 1991 – Pan American Games, Havana, Cuba (3rd)
- 1994 – World Cup, Dublin, Ireland (3rd)
- 1995 – Pan American Games, Mar del Plata, Argentina (2nd)
- 1995 – Champions Trophy, Mar del Plata, Argentina (3rd)
- 1996 – Summer Olympics, Atlanta, USA (5th)
- 1997 – Champions Trophy, Berlin, Germany (6th)
- 1998 – World Cup, Utrecht, The Netherlands (8th)
- 1999 – Pan American Games, Winnipeg, Canada (2nd)
- 2000 – Olympic Qualifying Tournament, Milton Keynes, England (6th)
