= Suzanne Plesman =

Dutch field hockey player

Personal information
- Born: October 23, 1971 (age 54)
Medal record
Women's field hockey
Representing the Netherlands
Olympic Games
| Bronze medal – third place | 1996 Atlanta | Team competition |
European Nations Cup
| Gold medal – first place | 1995 Amstelveen | Team competition |

Suzanne Barbara Plesman (born October 23, 1971, in The Hague, South Holland) is a former field hockey defense and midfield player from the Netherlands, who played 39 international matches for the Dutch National Women's Team. She made her debut on April 28, 1995, in a friendly match against England (3-3), and won the gold medal with the Netherlands at the 1995 Women's EuroHockey Nations Championship and the bronze medal at the 1996 Summer Olympics. Plesman retired from international competition after those Atlanta Games.
