= Andrea Wieland =

American field hockey player

Personal information
- Born: July 25, 1969 (age 56) Atlanta, Georgia, U.S.
Medal record
Women's field hockey
Representing the United States
World Cup
Bronze medal – third place	1994 Dublin	Team competition
Champions Trophy
Bronze medal – third place	1995 Mar del Plata	Team competition

Andrea Wieland (born July 25, 1969) is a former field hockey goalkeeper from the United States, who was a member of the US Women's Team that claimed the fifth spot at the 1996 Summer Olympics in her birthplace Atlanta. She attended the University of Iowa, where she played for the Hawkeyes.
