= Stella de Heij =

Dutch field hockey player

Personal information
- Born: 17 January 1968 (age 58)
Medal record
Women's field hockey
Representing the Netherlands
Olympic Games
Bronze medal – third place	1996 Atlanta	Team competition
Champions Trophy
Bronze medal – third place	1997 Berlin	Team competition
Euro Nations Cup
Gold medal – first place	1995 Amstelveen	Team competition

Stella de Heij (born 17 January 1968 in Driehuis) is a former field hockey goalkeeper from the Netherlands, who played eighteen international matches for her national team.

De Heij was a member of the Dutch Women's Team that, under the guidance of coach and former international Tom van 't Hek, won the bronze medal at the 1996 Summer Olympics, after defeating Great Britain on penalty strokes in the bronze medal game. In Atlanta, Georgia she was the stand-in for first choice goalie Jacqueline Toxopeus.
