= Sally Carbon =

Australian field hockey player (born 1967)

Medal record

Women's field hockey

Representing Australia

Olympic Games
| Gold medal – first place | 1988 Seoul | Team competition |

World Cup
| Gold medal – first place | 1994 Dublin | Team competition |
| Silver medal – second place | 1990 Sydney | Team competition |

Champions Trophy
| Gold medal – first place | 1991 Berlin | Team competition |
| Gold medal – first place | 1993 Amstelveen | Team competition |
| Silver medal – second place | 1989 Frankfurt | Team competition |

Sally Carbon OAM (born 14 April 1967, in Perth, Western Australia) represented Australia from 1987 until 1994 in field hockey.
