= Clover Maitland =

Australian field hockey player

Medal record

Women's field hockey

Representing Australia

Olympic Games
Gold medal – first place	1996 Atlanta	Team competition
Gold medal – first place	2000 Sydney	Team competition

World Cup
Gold medal – first place	1998 Utrecht	Team competition

Champions Trophy
Gold medal – first place	1995 Mar del Plata	Team competition
Gold medal – first place	1997 Berlin	Team competition
Gold medal – first place	1999 Brisbane	Team competition
Bronze medal – third place	2000 Amstelveen	Team competition

Clover Maitland OAM (born 14 March 1972 in Maryborough, Queensland) represents Australia in women's field hockey. The goalie was part of the double winning Olympic team in 1996 and 2000 along with the gold medal-winning team in the 1998 Commonwealth Games in Kuala Lumpur, Malaysia.

Maitland was awarded the Medal of the Order of Australia (OAM) in the 1997 Australia Day Honours and the Australian Sports Medal in June 2000.
