= Elena Urkizu =

Spanish field hockey player (born 1975)

Personal information
- Full name: Elena Urkizu Sáez
- Born: 29 January 1975 (age 51) San Sebastián, Guipúzcoa, Spain
- Height: 165 cm (5 ft 5 in)
- Weight: 56 kg (123 lb)
Medal record
Women's field hockey
Representing Spain
European Nations Cup
Silver medal – second place	1995 Amstelveen	Team Competition

Elena Urkizu Sáez (Note: In this Spanish name, the first or paternal surname is Urkizu and the second or maternal family name is Sáez.) (born 29 January 1975 in San Sebastián, Guipúzcoa) is a former field hockey defender from Spain. She represented her native country at two consecutive Olympic Games: in 1996 and 2000. At her last try she finished fourth with the Spanish national team, after a 2–0 loss in the bronze medal game against the Netherlands. Urkizu played club hockey for Real Sociedad.
