= Juliet Haslam =

Australian field hockey player

Personal information
- Nationality: Australian
- Born: 31 May 1969 (age 57) Australia
Medal record
Women's field hockey
Representing Australia
Olympic Games
Gold medal – first place	1996 Atlanta	Team
Gold medal – first place	2000 Sydney	Team
World Cup
Gold medal – first place	1994 Dublin	Team
Gold medal – first place	1998 Utrecht	Team
Commonwealth Games
Gold medal – first place	1998 Kuala Lumpur	Team
Champions Trophy
Gold medal – first place	1991 Berlin	Team
Gold medal – first place	1993 Amstelveen	Team
Gold medal – first place	1995 Mar del Plata	Team
Gold medal – first place	1997 Berlin	Team
Gold medal – first place	1999 Brisbane	Team
Silver medal – second place	1989 Frankfurt	Team

Juliet Haslam is a former field hockey defender and midfielder from Australia, who competed in three consecutive Summer Olympics, starting in 1992.

She was a member of the Australia women's national field hockey team, best known as the Hockeyroos, that won the gold medals at the 1996 and 2000 Summer Olympics. As well as being a dual Olympic Gold Medallist, she won a Commonwealth Games Gold Medal, two World Cup Gold Medals, five Champions Trophy Gold Medals and was named in the Australian Women’s ‘Team of the Century’.

On 26 October 2021, she was appointed as the head of Port Adelaide Power's AFLW operations for their 2023 entry into the AFL Women's competition.

== Hockey career ==
=== Club hockey ===
Haslam started playing hockey at the age of 10.

=== State hockey ===
She played in junior state and under age Australian teams.

In 1995, Haslam was the Captain of the Australian Hockey League team the Southern Suns that won the national championship.

She is on the South Australian Sports Institute Olympic Games Honour Roll.

=== International hockey ===
Haslam first played for Australia in 1989 and retired after the 2000 Sydney Olympics having played 220 games for Australia. She celebrated her 200th game for Australia in the 1999 Oceania Cup against New Zealand.

She is one of only three South Australians and one of only 16 females to have played over 200 international games for Australia.

Her achievements include:

- Playing in six Champions Trophy Tournaments from 1989 - 1999 winning five of those tournaments (1991, 1993, 1995, 1997, 1999)
- Competing in her first Olympic Games in Barcelona in 1992 and finishing 5th
- 1994 - World Cup - Ireland - Gold
- 1996 - Olympic Gold medal - Atlanta
- 1998 - World Cup - Holland - Gold
- 1998 - Commonwealth Games - Kuala Lumpur - Gold (Co-Captain)
- 2000 - Olympic Games Gold - Sydney

At the 2000 Olympics, Haslam scored a goal in the gold medal decider in her final match before retiring.

== Volunteering ==
Haslam is actively involved in the community serving in a number of ways. She has been on the Board of Hockey SA since early 2013.

She is an ambassador to the Premier's Reading Challenge, Roger Rasheed foundation which helps give kids a sporting chance, and Port Adelaide Football Club.

== Recognition ==
In 1996, she was named the Telstra's Player's Player Award.

As part of the Australia Day honours in January 1997, Haslam was given the Medal of the Order of Australia (OAM) for service to sport as a Gold Medallist at the Atlanta Olympic Games. Also in 1997, she was awarded SASI Female Athlete of the Year.

In 2000, she was awarded:

- SA Great Female Athlete of the Year
- SASI Female Athlete of the Year
- SA Great Sports Star of the Year

In 2004, Haslam was named SA Greatest Ever Hockey Player.

In 2010, Haslam was one of the inaugural inductees to the KPMG South Australian Sport Hall of Fame.

As a member of the 2000 Sydney Olympic Games gold-medal-winning Hockeyroos, Haslam was named in the Australian Women's "Team of the Century" at the 2013 Centenary of Canberra Sportswomen's Ball conducted at The Great Hall, Parliament House, Canberra.

== Personal life ==
Haslam lives in Adelaide, South Australia. Her father is Ross Haslam, who played 113 games for the Port Adelaide Magpies.

She is married to former footballer Andrew Obst.
