= Karen Marsden =

Australian field hockey player

Medal record

Women's field hockey

Representing Australia

Olympic Games
Gold medal – first place	1996 Atlanta	Team competition

World Cup
Gold medal – first place	1994 Dublin	Team competition

Champions Trophy
Gold medal – first place	1993 Amstelveen	Team competition

Karen Elizabeth Marsden OAM (born 28 November 1962 in Perth) is a former Australian field hockey goalkeeper, who was a member of the Olympic gold medal winning team of the 1996 Summer Olympics.

Marsden was awarded the Medal of the Order of Australia (OAM) in the 1997 Australia Day Honours and the Australian Sports Medal in 2000.
