= Mónica Rueda =

Spanish field hockey player (born 1976)

Personal information
- Full name: Mónica Rueda Guardeño
- Born: 20 January 1976 (age 50) Jaén, Spain
Medal record
Women's field hockey
Representing Spain
Champions Challenge
Silver medal – second place	2003 Catania	Team competition
European Nations Cup
Silver medal – second place	1995 Amstelveen	Team competition

Mónica Rueda Guardeño (Note: In this Spanish name, the first or paternal surname is Rueda and the second or maternal family name is Guardeño.) (born 20 January 1976 in Jaén) is a field hockey defender from Spain. She represented her native country at two Summer Olympics: in 1996 (Atlanta, Georgia) and 2004 (Athens, Greece). She played club hockey at Club de Campo in Madrid.
