= Jacqueline Toxopeus =

Dutch field hockey player

Medal record

Women's field hockey

Representing the Netherlands

Olympic Games
Bronze medal – third place	1996 Atlanta	Team competition

World Cup
Gold medal – first place	1990 Sydney	Team competition

Champions Trophy
Bronze medal – third place	1991 Berlin	Team competition

Euro Nations Cup
Gold medal – first place	1995 Amstelveen	Team competition

Jacqueline Afine Toxopeus (born 11 December 1964 in Wageningen, Gelderland), nicknamed "Tox", is a former Dutch field hockey international playing in goal.

Toxopeus played for several clubs in the Netherlands, but ended her career with HC Den Bosch. In the spring of 2006 she made a short comeback with HC Rotterdam after several injuries in the squad.
