= Liz Tchou =

American field hockey player

Medal record

Women's field hockey

Representing the United States

Champions Trophy
Bronze medal – third place	1995 Mar del Plata	Team competition

Elizabeth Tchou (born September 25, 1966 in Medford, New Jersey) is a former field hockey defender from the United States and is currently working for the USA Field Hockey Association as Manager of Youth Development. Tchou was a member of the US women's team that finished fifth at the 1996 Summer Olympics in Atlanta, Georgia.

Tchou was raised in Medford Lakes, New Jersey and attended Shawnee High School.

Tchou graduated from the University of Iowa, where she played for the Hawkeyes. A four-time all-Big Ten midfielder, she earned All-America status in 1987 and was a part of the NCAA All-Tournament Team that same year. Tchou was a part of three Big Ten championships and three NCAA Final Four teams, including the 1986 national championship squad.

In 2005, Liz married the love of her life, William Bradley Lewis.
