= Florentine Steenberghe =

Dutch field hockey player

Personal information
- Born: 11 November 1967 (age 58)
Medal record
Women's field hockey
Representing the Netherlands
Olympic Games
Bronze medal – third place	1996 Atlanta	Team competition
World Cup
Gold medal – first place	1990 Sydney	Team competition
Champions Trophy
Bronze medal – third place	1991 Berlin	Team competition
European Nations Cup
Gold medal – first place	1995 Amstelveen	Team competition

Florentine Pauline Frederique Steenberghe (born 11 November 1967 in Utrecht) is a former Dutch field hockey midfielder, who played 113 international matches for the Dutch national team, in which she scored six goals.

A player from HGC in the 1990s, she competed at the 1992 and the 1996 Summer Olympics, winning bronze in Atlanta, Georgia.
