= Sweden women's national field hockey team =

Sweden
- Association: Swedish Hockey Association
- Confederation: EHF (Europe)

FIH ranking
- Current: NR (4 March 2025)

EuroHockey Championship
- Appearances: 1 (first in 1995)
- Best result: 12th (1995)

The Sweden women's national field hockey team represents Sweden in women's international field hockey competitions.

== Tournament history ==
=== EuroHockey Championship ===
- 1995 – 12th place

== See also ==
- Sweden men's national field hockey team
