= Patty Shea =

American field hockey player (born 1962)

Personal information
- Born: September 15, 1962 (age 63) Belmont, Massachusetts, U.S.
- Education: UMass
Medal record
Women's field hockey
Representing United States
Champions Trophy
Bronze medal – third place	1995 Mar del Plata	Team competition
Pan American Games
Silver medal – second place	1987 Indianapolis	Team competition
Silver medal – second place	1995 Mar del Plata	Team competition

Patricia ("Patty") Ann Shea (born September 15, 1962 in Belmont, Massachusetts) is a former field hockey goalkeeper from the United States, who was a member of the US women's team that finished fifth at the 1996 Summer Olympics in Atlanta, Georgia. She also competed in the 1988 Summer Olympics in Seoul, where Team USA finished in eighth and last position.

== Life ==
She graduated from Belmont High School in 1980. During her high school years, she had been part of the field hockey and lacrosse. Overcoming more than a dozen knee surgeries in her eleven-year National Team career, Shea anchored the USA defense as the team’s unyielding goalkeeper from 1985-1996. She defended the USA goal on the way to a World Hockey Cup bronze medal in 1994, and made an additional World Cup appearance in 1986, and earned silver medals in 1987 Pan American Games, and 1995 Pan American Games. She also won a bronze medal at the 1995 Champions Trophy. Shea concluded her career in 1996 with 87 career international appearances.

As a result of her play in her two Olympic Tournaments, Shea was named the USA Field Hockey Athlete of the Year in 1988 and 1996. The University of Massachusetts Amherst (1984) graduate is a two-time All-America selection (1982 and 1983) and a member of the Belmont High School Hall of Fame.

She was the head coach at the University of Massachusetts, Amherst where she earned Atlantic-10 Coach of the Year honors in 1999 and 2000. Her contract was not renewed after a disappointing 2006 season.
