= Ingrid Wolff =

Dutch field hockey player

Personal information
- Born: 17 February 1964 (age 62)
Medal record
Women's field hockey
Representing the Netherlands
Olympic Games
Bronze medal – third place	1988 Seoul	Team
World Cup
Gold medal – first place	1990 Sydney	Team
Champions Trophy
Bronze medal – third place	1991 Berlin	Team
European Nations Cup
Gold medal – first place	1987 London	Team

Ingrid Imelda Wolff (born 17 February 1964 in The Hague, South Holland) is a former Dutch field hockey forward, who won the bronze medal with the National Women's Team at the 1988 Summer Olympics.

Four years later in Barcelona she finished in sixth position with the national side. From 1985 to 1992 she played a total number of 107 international matches for Holland, in which she scored 33 goals. A player from HDM in The Hague, she retired after the 1992 Summer Olympics.
