= Danielle Koenen =

Dutch field hockey player

Personal information
- Nationality: Dutch
- Born: 20 July 1968 (age 57) Uden, Netherlands

Sport
- Sport: Field hockey

Danielle Koenen (born 20 July 1968) is a Dutch field hockey player. She competed in the women's tournament at the 1992 Summer Olympics.
