= Lisa Naughton =

Australian field hockey player

Lisa Naughton (born 2 April 1963) is an Australian former field hockey player who competed in the 1992 Summer Olympics.
