= Irina Kuhnt =

German field hockey player

Personal information
- Born: 18 January 1968 (age 58) Bad Harzburg, West Germany
- Height: 1.62 m (5 ft 4 in)
- Weight: 58 kg (128 lb)

Sport
- Sport: Field hockey
Senior career
Years	Team	Caps	Goals
–	Eintracht Braunschweig	-	-
–	Berliner HC	-	-
National team
Years	Team	Caps	Goals
1987–1996	Germany	147	-
Medal record
Representing Germany
Olympic Games
Silver medal – second place	1992 Barcelona	Team competition
Champions Trophy
Silver medal – second place	1991 Berlin	Team competition
Bronze medal – third place	1993 Amstelveen	Team competition
European Nations Cup
Bronze medal – third place	1995 Amstelveen	Team Competition

Irina Volkert née Kuhnt (born 18 January 1968 in Bad Harzburg, Lower Saxony) is a former field hockey player from Germany.

She was a member of the Women's National Team that won the silver medal at the 1992 Summer Olympics in Barcelona, Spain. She also competed in the 1996 Summer Olympics. In total, she has represented Germany in 147 matches.

During her club career she played for the hockey clubs Eintracht Braunschweig and Berliner HC.
