= Cindy Werley =

American field hockey player

Medal record

Women's field hockey

Representing the United States

Champions Trophy
Bronze medal – third place	1995 Mar del Plata	Team Competition

Pan American Games
Silver medal – second place	1995 Mar del Plata	Team competition
Silver medal – second place	1999 Winnipeg	Team competition

Cindy Werley (born February 26, 1975) is a former Olympic field hockey forward from the United States, who made her international debut for the Women's National Team in 1994. She was a member of the American team that competed at the 1996 Summer Olympics in Atlanta, Georgia.

She won a bronze medal at the 1995 Pan American Games.

== Early life and education ==
Werley was born in Allentown, Pennsylvania, on February 26, 1975. She attended Emmaus High School in Emmaus, Pennsylvania, where she was a member of the Emmaus High School girls field hockey team, one of the best girls field hockey high school teams in the nation.

== College ==
Werley played field hockey on the collegiate level at the University of North Carolina, leading that team to two national championships. She won the Honda Sports Award as the nation's best collegiate field hockey player in both 1996–97 and 1997–98. Werley graduated from the University of North Carolina in 1998.

== International senior tournaments ==
- 1995 – Pan American Games, Mar del Plata, Argentina (2nd place)
- 1995 – Champions Trophy, Mar del Plata, Argentina (3rd place)
- 1996 – Summer Olympics, Atlanta, United States (5th place)
- 1999 – Pan American Games, Winnipeg, Manitoba, Canada (2nd place)
- 1999 – Sydney International Hockey Challenge, Sydney, Australia (2nd place)
- 2000 – Olympic Qualifying Tournament, Milton Keynes, England (6th place)

== Collegiate and high school accomplishments ==
- 1992 – U.S. Under-21 Team.
- 1994, 1996 and 1997 – NFHCA All-American
- 1996–97 and 1997–98 – Honda Sports Award (field hockey) winner
- 1994, 1995 and 1997 – All-ACC Tournament
- 1994, 1996 and 1997 – All-ACC
- 1994, 1996 and 1997 – ACC Tournament "Most Valuable Player"
- 1996 and 1997 – ACC "Player of the Year"
- 1994, 1996 and 1997 – NCAA All-Tournament
- 1996 and 1997 – NCAA National Champion with University of North Carolina
