= Nicole Koolen =

Dutch field hockey player

Personal information
- Born: 1 December 1972 (age 53) Aldershot, Hampshire, England
Medal record
Women's field hockey
Representing the Netherlands
Olympic Games
Bronze medal – third place	1996 Atlanta	Team competition
Champions Trophy
Bronze medal – third place	1997 Berlin	Team competition
Euro Nations Cup
Gold medal – first place	1995 Amstelveen	Team competition

Nicole ("Nicky") Simone Tellier-Koolen (born 1 December 1972 in Aldershot, Hampshire, United Kingdom) is a former field hockey midfield player from the Netherlands, who played a total number of 53 international matches for the Dutch National Women's Team, in which she scored two goals. She made her debut on 1 February 1995 in a friendly against South Africa (0–3), and won the bronze medal with Holland at the 1996 Summer Olympics.
