= Pamela Bustin =

American field hockey player

Personal information
- Born: April 24, 1967 (age 59)
Medal record
Women's field hockey
Representing the United States
Champions Trophy
Bronze medal – third place	1995 Mar del Plata	Team competition

Pamela "Pam" Bustin (born April 24, 1967, in Somerset, Massachusetts) is a former field hockey defender from the United States, who was a member of the US women's team that finished fifth at the 1996 Summer Olympics in Atlanta, Georgia. Bustin served as the head coach for the University of Louisville field hockey team in Louisville, Kentucky from 1998 through the 2010 season.

Bustin was hired as the field hockey head coach at Duke University in December 2010. In her 5 seasons at Duke, Bustin has led the Blue Devils to two Final Four appearances and participated in one National Championship game in 2013. In 2013, Bustin was named NFHCA South Region Coach of the Year.

In 2015, Bustin led her team to the Final Four in Michigan, there falling short to UNC. The Duke Field Hockey team had a great run in 2016, ending as ACC regular season champions and ranked #1 in the NCAA poll. That year, Bustin has earned 2016 ACC Coach of the year and 2016 NFHCA South Region Coach of the year.

Prior to Duke, Bustin was the assistant coach at Temple University from 1990 to 1992 and Michigan State from 1992 to 1997. In the fall of 1997 she was the head coach at Hofstra, but soon moved on to coach at the University of Louisville from 1998 to 2010. At Louisville Bustin earned MAC Coach of the Year in 2001 and 2004, and Big East Coach of the Year in 2008. Bustin moved on to be the head coach at Duke in 2011.
