= Leo Klein Gebbink =

Dutch field hockey player

Personal information
- Born: 9 January 1968 (age 58) Zelhem, Netherlands

Sport
- Sport: Field hockey
- Position: Midfielder
Senior career
Years	Team	Caps	Goals
–	DHC	-	-
–	TMHC Tilburg	-	-
–	Kampong	-	-
–	MHC Vianen	-	-
–	Bommelerwaard	-	-
National team
Years	Team	Caps	Goals
1990–1998	Netherlands	143	-
Medal record
Men's field hockey
Representing the Netherlands
Olympic Games
Gold medal – first place	1996 Atlanta	Team
World Cup
Gold medal – first place	1998 Utrecht	Team
Silver medal – second place	1994 Sydney	Team
Champions Trophy
Bronze medal – third place	1993 Kuala Lumpur	Team

Leo Klein Gebbink (born 9 January 1968 in Zelhem, Gelderland) is a former field hockey midfield player from The Netherlands, who represented his native country in two consecutive Summer Olympics (1992 and 1996).

At his last appearance in Atlanta, Georgia, the midfielder won the gold medal with the Dutch national team. A former player of Kampong, he is married to the Dutch former field hockey international Jeannette Lewin. He earned a total number of 143 caps, scoring eight goals for the Netherlands during the 1990s.
