= Elena Carrión =

Spanish field hockey player (born 1970)

Personal information
- Born: August 3, 1970 (age 56)
Medal record
Women's Athletics
Representing Spain
European Nations Cup
Silver medal – second place	1995 Amstelveen	Team competition

Elena Carrión de la Lastra (born August 3, 1970) is a former field hockey goalkeeper from Spain, who represented her native country at two consecutive Olympic Games: in 1996 and 2000. At her last try, she finished fourth with the Spanish national team, after a 2–0 loss in the bronze medal game against the Netherlands. In 1996, in Atlanta, the goalie of Sardinero Caja Cantabria finished in 8th position.

== Bibliography ==
- Evans, Hilary; Gjerde, Arild; Heijmans, Jeroen; Mallon, Bill; et al. "Elena Carrión". Olympics at Sports-Reference.com. Sports Reference LLC. Archived from the original on 2009-07-06.
