= Choi Eun-kyung (field hockey) =

South Korean field hockey player

Olympic medal record

Women's field hockey

Representing South Korea
Silver medal – second place	1996 Atlanta	Team competition

Choi Eun-Kyung (born 23 September 1971) is a South Korean former field hockey player who competed in the 1996 Summer Olympics.
