= Michelle Andrews =

Australian field hockey player

Medal record
Women's field hockey
Representing Australia
Olympic Games
Gold medal – first place	1996 Atlanta	Team
World Cup
Gold medal – first place	1994 Dublin	Team
Commonwealth Games
Gold medal – first place	1998 Kuala Lumpur	Team
Champions Trophy
Gold medal – first place	1993 Amstelveen	Team
Gold medal – first place	1995 Mar del Plata	Team
Gold medal – first place	1997 Berlin	Team
Gold medal – first place	1999 Brisbane	Team

Michelle "Shelley" Andrews OAM (born 19 November 1971 in Newcastle, New South Wales) is a former field hockey midfielder from Australia, who was a member of the Australia women's national field hockey team, known as the Hockeyroos, that won the gold medal at the 1996 Summer Olympics in Atlanta, Georgia. She now uses her married name of Mitchell and went on to coach at Teddington Hockey Club, Greater London. These day, Mitchell lives in the Gold Coast, Queensland, working as a Health and Well-being Manager for Surfing Australia. She has three children with her husband, Euan Mitchell.

On 26 January 1997, Andrews was awarded the Order of Australia in "recognition of service to sport as a gold medallist at the Atlanta Olympic Games 1996". On 22 June 2000, Andrews was awarded the Australian Sports Medal for hockey achievements.
