= Simone Thomaschinski =

German field hockey player

Personal information
- Born: Simone Heike Thomaschinski; 4 April 1970 (age 56) Frankfurt am Main, Hessen
- Height: 176 cm (5 ft 9 in)
- Weight: 64 kg (141 lb)

Sport
- Sport: Field hockey
Medal record
Women's field hockey
Representing Germany
Olympic Games
Silver medal – second place	1992 Barcelona	Team competition
Champions Trophy
Bronze medal – third place	1993 Amstelveen	Team competition
European Nations Cup
Bronze medal – third place	1995 Amstelveen	Team Competition

Simone Heike Thomaschinski (born 4 April 1970), married name Gräßer, later Zimmermann, is a former field hockey defender from Germany.

She was a member of the Women's National Team that won the silver medal at the 1992 Summer Olympics in Barcelona, Spain. A player from hockey club RTHC Bayer Leverkusen, she competed in two consecutive Summer Olympics, starting in 1992.
