= Jill Atkins =

British field hockey player

Personal information
- Full name: Gillian Atkins
- Born: 30 May 1963 (age 63) Bradford, Yorkshire, England

Sport
- Sport: Field hockey
Medal record
Women's field hockey
Representing Great Britain
Olympic Games
Bronze medal – third place	1992 Barcelona	Team
Representing England
European Nations Cup
Gold medal – first place	1991 Brussels	Team
Silver medal – second place	1987 London	Team

Gillian "Jill" Atkins (born 30 May 1963) is a former field hockey player, who was a member of the British squad that won the bronze medal at the 1992 Summer Olympics in Barcelona. She competed in three consecutive Summer Olympics, starting in 1988.

Her father is Denis Atkins, a footballer who played for Huddersfield Town and Bradford City.
