= Jenn Morris =

Australian field hockey player

Personal information
- Born: 20 September 1972 (age 53)
Medal record
Women's field hockey
Representing Australia
Olympic Games
Gold medal – first place	1996 Atlanta	Team competition
Gold medal – first place	2000 Sydney	Team competition
World Cup
Gold medal – first place	1994 Dublin	Team competition
Champions Trophy
Gold medal – first place	1993 Amstelveen	Team competition
Gold medal – first place	1995 Mar del Plata	Team competition
Gold medal – first place	1997 Berlin	Team competition
Bronze medal – third place	2000 Amstelveen	Team competition

Jennifer Lyn Morris OAM (born 20 September 1972) is a non-executive director of Sandfire Resources. Born on 20 September 1972 in Maryborough, Queensland, Morris is a former field hockey defender, who was a member of the Australian Women's Hockey Team, best known as the Hockeyroos, that won the gold medal at the 1996 Summer Olympics in Atlanta, Georgia. Four years later she was on the squad, winning the title, this time at home in Sydney, Australia. Making her international debut in 1992, Morris was famous for her penalty corner.

Morris was awarded the Medal of the Order of Australia (OAM) in the 1997 Australia Day Honours.

In 2009 Morris was appointed to the board of the Fremantle Football Club.

In 2014, she was appointed as a Human Capital Consulting Partner at Deloitte Australia in Perth.

In November 2016, Morris was appointed a Non-Executive Director of Fortescue Metals Group Ltd.

In 2017, Morris joined Walk Free, Minderoo Foundation's anti-slavery initiative, as the Director of Business and Government Engagement. Shortly after this she was appointed Chief Executive Officer.

Morris left Walk Free in 2019.
