= Renita Farrell =

Australian field hockey player

Renita Farrell AM
Personal information
- Full name: Renita Maree Farrell-Garard
- Born: 30 May 1972 (age 54) Townsville, Queensland, Australia

Sport
- Sport: Field hockey
Medal record
Women's field hockey
Representing Australia
Olympic Games
Gold medal – first place	1996 Atlanta	Team competition
Gold medal – first place	2000 Sydney	Team competition
World Cup
Gold medal – first place	1994 Dublin	Team competition
Champions Trophy
Gold medal – first place	1995 Mar del Plata	Team competition
Gold medal – first place	1997 Berlin	Team competition
Gold medal – first place	1999 Brisbane	Team competition
Bronze medal – third place	2000 Amstelveen	Team competition

Renita Maree Farrell-Garard AM (born 30 May 1972) is a former field hockey player from Australia, who was a member of the Australian Women's Hockey Team, best known as the Hockeyroos, that won the gold medals at the 1996 and the 2000 Summer Olympics. She made her international debut in 1994, and co-captained the winning Atlanta side.

She is married to Gerry Garard, father of Brendan Garard, a field hockey player who claimed the bronze medal at the men's competition in Atlanta, Georgia.

Farrell was awarded the Medal of the Order of Australia (OAM) in the 1997 Australia Day Honours and the Australian Sports Medal in June 2000.
