= Diane Madl =

American field hockey player

Andrea Wieland
Personal information
- Born: August 31, 1967 (age 58)
Medal record
Women's field hockey
Representing the United States

Diane Madl (born August 31, 1967) is an American former field hockey player who competed in the 1996 Summer Olympics. She is in her 20th season as Head Field Hockey Coach at Providence College.

== Life ==
Madl, a native of Mountaintop, Pennsylvania, was a three-sport stand-out in field hockey, basketball and softball at Crestwood High School (Pennsylvania). Upon completion of her high school career, she went on to play field hockey at the University of Connecticut from 1985-88. While at UConn, she helped the Huskies capture the NCAA Division I National Championship in 1985. She was a two-time All-America selection as a junior and senior (1987, 1988) and earned the prestigious Honda Broderick Award upon the completion of her career, as the top collegiate field hockey player in the nation. Madl also earned Academic All-America honors and graduated magna cum laude, with a bachelor's degree in business administration in 1989.

Madl went on to play for the U.S. National Team and competed in a multitude of events for Team USA, including the World University Games (1989), World Cup (1990), Inter-Continental Cup (1989 and 1995) and the Champions Trophy (1995). She reached the pinnacle of her playing career in 1996 as a member of the U.S. National Team that competed in the Olympic Games, held in Atlanta, Georgia. Madl still finds time to give back to U.S. Field Hockey. She remains active with Futures, having coached the U-19 team in the USA/Canadian Challenge Cup (2005) and assisted the U-16 team that participated in the U.S. Olympic Development Select/Futures Elite International Easter Tournament in the Netherlands (2007). Madl also has served as an assistant coach for USA Field Hockey High Performance Women's National Championship New England Team (2006–2008), and assisted the team at the New England Training Center in 2009 prior to the Women's National Championship. In 2010, Madl continued her involvement with HPTC as an assistant for Boston's Senior Team under the new format for the Women's National Championship. Madl recently earned her U.S. Field Hockey Level III Coaching Accreditation in 2009, which is the highest coaching accreditation in the U.S. system. With the accreditation, Madl is eligible to work with the U.S. National Team programs.

Madl's coaching career began at the University of Maine as an assistant in 1993. She remained with the Black Bear program for nine seasons until departing for Providence College.

In addition to her success at Providence College and her activity within the circles of U.S. Field Hockey, Madl served as the camp director for Providence College Field Hockey Day Camps in 2003 and 2004. Since then, she has taken ownership of Circle to Circle Field Hockey Camps, LLC., which came to fruition in 2005. During the summer of 2006, Madl added a Team Camp to her Circle to Circle summer circuit and has flourished, becoming one of the top camp organizations in the Northeast.

Madl was inducted into the Luzerne County (Pa.) Athletic Hall of Fame in 2005, and was inducted into the Pennsylvania State Athletic Hall of Fame on May 18, 2008. She is the daughter of Ruth Ann and David Madl of Mountaintop, PA.
