= Begoña Larzabal =

Spanish field hockey player (born 1971)

Begoña Larzábal
Personal information
- Full name: Begoña Aránzazu Larzábal Fernández
- Born: 19 January 1971 (age 55) Madrid, Spain
Medal record
Women's field hockey
Representing Spain
European Nations Cup
Silver medal – second place	1995 Amstelveen	Team Competition

Begoña Aránzazu Larzábal Fernández (born 19 January 1971 in Madrid) is a former field hockey midfielder from Spain, who represented her native country at two consecutive Olympic Games: in 1996 and 2000. At her last try she finished fourth with the Spanish national team, after a 2–0 loss in the bronze medal game against the Netherlands.
