= Susan Fraser =

British field hockey player

Sue Fraser
Personal information
- Full name: Susan Barbara Fraser
- Born: 15 July 1966 (age 59) Aberdeen, Scotland

Sport
- Sport: Field hockey
Medal record
Women's field hockey
Representing Great Britain
Olympic Games
Bronze medal – third place	1992 Barcelona	Team

Susan Barbara "Sue" Fraser (born 15 July 1966 in Aberdeen, Scotland) is a former field hockey player from Scotland, who was a member of the British squad that won the bronze medal at the 1992 Summer Olympics in Barcelona. Four years later in Atlanta, Georgia she ended up in fourth place with the national squad. She was a teacher at Tayview Primary School in Dundee but had recently retired in 2025.
