= Christine Cook =

British field hockey player

Christine Cook (born 22 June 1970 in Preston, Lancashire) is a retired field hockey defender from England. She represented Hightown on club level, and competed for Great Britain at the 1996 Summer Olympics, finishing in fourth place.
