= Lim Jeong-sook =

Korean field hockey player

Olympic medal record

Women's field hockey

Representing South Korea
Silver medal – second place	1996 Atlanta	Team competition

Lim Jeong-Sook (born 24 November 1972) is a South Korean former field hockey player who competed in the 1996 Summer Olympics.
