= Danni Roche =

Australian field hockey player

Medal record

Representing Australia

Women's field hockey

Olympic Games
Gold medal – first place	1996 Atlanta	Team competition

Danielle Roche OAM (born 25 May 1970) is a former field hockey player, who was a member of the Australian Women's Hockey Team, commonly known as the "Hockeyroos", which won the gold medal at the 1996 Summer Olympics in Atlanta, Georgia.

== Personal ==
Roche was born in Melbourne on 25 May 1970. She is the daughter of Ken Roche, who was a hurdler at the 1964 Summer Olympics and won two Commonwealth Games gold medals.

== Hockey career ==
Roche made her debut as a 19 year old for the Australian team in 1989 in the Australia vs New Zealand series. She was a member of the Australian Women's Hockey Team that won the gold medal at the 1996 Summer Olympics in Atlanta, Georgia. She was an Australian Institute of Sport hockey scholarship holder and played for MCC Hockey Club.

== Business career ==
Roche has held finance and commercial positions with Telstra, has been a Director at UBS, a partner at Evans and Partners. Roche is a Director of a privately owned fraud and risk management business.

== Community leadership ==
In 2017, Roche was named Chair of the National Australia Day Council.

== Sports administration ==
Roche was a Hockey Australia Director for seven years until she was appointed to the St Kilda Football Club Board in 2012. She was appointed to the Australian Sports Commission Board on 4 May 2016. Roche is a Trust Member of Victorian State Sports Centres.

In March 2017, Roche announced that she was standing for the President of the Australian Olympic Committee. It was first time that John Coates has been challenged for the Presidency, a position held since 1990.
