= Maider Tellería =

Spanish field hockey player (born 1973)

Medal record

Women's field hockey

Representing Spain

Olympic Games
Gold medal – first place	1992 Barcelona	Team competition

Champions Challenge
Silver medal – second place	2003 Catania	Team Competition

European Nations Cup
Silver medal – second place	1995 Amstelveen	Team Competition

Maider Tellería Goñi (born 14 July 1973 in San Sebastián) is a former Basque Spanish field hockey player. She was a member of the gold medal-winning Women's National Team at the 1992 Summer Olympics in Barcelona.

The defender also competed in the women's tournament at the 1996 Summer Olympics in Atlanta (finishing in last place), and in the 2000 Summer Olympics Women's Tournament in Sydney, where Spain finished fourth, losing in the bronze medal game to the Netherlands. Her last Olympic appearance came at the 2004 Summer Olympics in Athens, where the team finished the women's tournament in 10th place.

== Team history ==
- Ikastola Zurriola
- Club Lagunak
- Real Sociedad
- Club de Campo Villa de Madrid
- Sardinero de Santander
