= Leslie Lyness =

American field hockey player (born 1968)

Medal record

Women's field hockey

Representing the United States

Champions Trophy
Bronze medal – third place	1995 Mar del Plata	Team Competition

Leslie Lyness (born August 7, 1968 in Paoli, Pennsylvania) is a former field hockey midfielder from the United States, who was a member of the US women's team that finished fifth at the 1996 Summer Olympics in Atlanta, Georgia. Her first selection came in 1990. She won a bronze medal at the 1995 Pan American Games.

== College ==
In 1990, while at North Carolina, Lyness won the Honda Award (now the Honda Sports Award) as the nation's best field hockey player.
