= Jin Deok-san =

South Korean field hockey player

Medal record

Women's field hockey

Representing South Korea

Olympic Games
Silver medal – second place	1996 Atlanta	Team

Asian Games
Gold medal – first place	1994 Hiroshima	Team

Jin Deok-San (born 12 December 1972) is a South Korean former field hockey player who competed in the 1992 Summer Olympics and in the 1996 Summer Olympics.
