= Tammy Miller (field hockey) =

British field hockey player

Personal information
- Full name: Tammy Kelly Miller
- Born: 21 June 1967 (age 59) Stockport, Cheshire

Sport
- Sport: Field hockey
Medal record
Women's field hockey
Representing Great Britain
Olympic Games
Bronze medal – third place	1992 Barcelona	Team
Representing England
European Nations Cup
Gold medal – first place	1991 Brussels	Team

Tammy Kelly Miller (born 21 June 1967 in Stockport, Cheshire) is a former field hockey player, who was a member of the British squad that won the bronze medal at the 1992 Summer Olympics in Barcelona. She competed in two consecutive Summer Olympics, starting in 1992.

In 1995 she was UK (Hockey) Player of the year.

She is a graduate of Mathematical Statistics and Operational Research (1989) at the University of Exeter.
