= Kathryn Johnson (field hockey, born 1967) =

British field hockey player

Kath Johnson
Personal information
- Full name: Kathryn Louise Johnson
- Born: 21 January 1967 (age 59) King's Lynn, Norfolk

Sport
- Sport: Field hockey
Medal record
Women's field hockey
Representing Great Britain
Olympic Games
Bronze medal – third place	1992 Barcelona	Team
Representing England
European Nations Cup
Gold medal – first place	1991 Brussels	Team

Kathryn Louise "Kath" Johnson (born 21 January 1967 in King's Lynn, Norfolk) is a British former field hockey player.

Johnson was a member of the Great Britain squad that won the bronze medal at the 1992 Summer Olympics in Barcelona. She competed in three consecutive Summer Olympics, starting in 1992.

She has played club hockey for Pelicans Hockey Club, Harleston Magpies and Leicester.
