= Kate Starre =

Australian field hockey player

Personal information
- Full name: Kathryn Starre
- Born: 18 September 1971 (age 54)
Medal record
Women's field hockey
Representing Australia
Olympic Games
Gold medal – first place	1996 Atlanta	Team
Gold medal – first place	2000 Sydney	Team
World Cup
Gold medal – first place	1994 Dublin	Team
Gold medal – first place	1998 Utrecht	Team
Commonwealth Games
Gold medal – first place	1998 Kuala Lumpur	Team
Champions Trophy
Gold medal – first place	1991 Berlin	Team
Gold medal – first place	1993 Amstelveen	Team
Gold medal – first place	1995 Mar del Plata	Team
Gold medal – first place	1997 Berlin	Team
Bronze medal – third place	2000 Amstelveen	Team

Kate Starre OAM (born 18 September 1971 in Armadale, Western Australia) is a former field hockey midfielder from Australia, who competed for her native country in three consecutive Summer Olympics, starting in 1992 (Barcelona, Spain). She was a member of the Australian Women's Hockey Team, best known as the Hockeyroos, that won the gold medals at the 1996 and the 2000 Summer Olympics.

She is the head coach for Canterbury Ladies 1XI, in England, from the start of the 2017–18 season. In June 2018, Starre joined the Fremantle Football Club's AFL Women's team as a high performance manager. One of her key areas of focus is implementing an anterior cruciate ligament (ACL) injury prevention program.

Starre was awarded the Medal of the Order of Australia (OAM) in the 1997 Australia Day Honours and the Australian Sports Medal in June 2000.
