= Jorgelina Rimoldi =

Argentine field hockey player

Personal information
- Born: October 5, 1971 (age 54)
Medal record
Women's field hockey
Representing Argentina
Olympic Games
Silver medal – second place	2000 Sydney	Team
World Cup
Silver medal – second place	1994 Dublin	Team
Pan American Games
Gold medal – first place	1991 Havana	Team
Gold medal – first place	1995 Mar del Plata	Team
Gold medal – first place	1999 Winnipeg	Team
Champions Trophy
Gold medal – first place	2001 Amstelveen	Team

Jorgelina Rimoldi Puig (born October 5, 1971) is a field hockey player from Argentina, who won the silver medal with the national women's hockey team at the 2000 Summer Olympics in Sydney and the Champions Trophy in 2001.
