= María Carmen Barea =

Spanish field hockey player (born 1966)

Personal information
- Full name: María del Carmen Barea Cobos
- Born: 5 October 1966 (age 59) Málaga, Spain
Medal record
Women's field hockey
Representing Spain
Olympic Games
Gold medal – first place	1992 Barcelona	Team competition
European Nations Cup
Silver medal – second place	1995 Amstelveen	Team competition

María del Carmen Barea Cobos (born 5 October 1966 in Málaga) is a former field hockey defender from Spain, who was a member of the Women's National Team that surprisingly won the gold medal at the 1992 Summer Olympics on home soil (Barcelona).

She also represented her native country at the 1996 Summer Olympics (Atlanta, Georgia) and at the 2000 Summer Olympics (Sydney). Carmen Barea played club hockey for Universidad de Sevilla.
