= Verónica Artica =

Argentine field hockey player

Verónica Artica (born 9 January 1970) is an Argentine former field hockey player who competed in the 1996 Summer Olympics.
