= Sonia de Ignacio =

Spanish field hockey player (born 1971)

Personal information
- Born: 24 January 1971 (age 55)
Medal record
Women's field hockey
Representing Spain
European Nations Cup
Silver medal – second place	1995 Amstelveen	Team Competition

Sonia de Ignacio-Simo Casas (born 24 January 1971 in Terrassa, Catalonia) is a former female field hockey player from Spain, who represented her native country twice at the Olympic Games: 1996 and 2000. She played club hockey for CD Terrassa in Catalunya.
