= Lisa Powell =

Australian field hockey player (born 1970)

Personal information
- Born: 8 July 1970 (age 55)
Medal record
Women's field hockey
Representing Australia
Olympic Games
Gold medal – first place	1996 Atlanta	Team
Gold medal – first place	2000 Sydney	Team
World Cup
Gold medal – first place	1994 Dublin	Team
Gold medal – first place	1998 Utrecht	Team
Silver medal – second place	1990 Sydney	Team
Commonwealth Games
Gold medal – first place	1998 Kuala Lumpur	Team
Champions Trophy
Gold medal – first place	1991 Berlin	Team
Gold medal – first place	1993 Amstelveen	Team
Gold medal – first place	1995 Mar del Plata	Team
Gold medal – first place	1997 Berlin	Team
Gold medal – first place	1999 Brisbane	Team
Silver medal – second place	1989 Frankfurt	Team
Bronze medal – third place	2000 Amstelveen	Team

Lisa Josephine Carruthers OAM (née Powell) (born 8 July 1970 in Sydney) is a former field hockey forward, who was a member of the Australian Women's Hockey Team, best known as the Hockeyroos, that won the gold medal at the 1996 and 2000 Summer Olympics. She is currently a senior hockey coach at Melbourne High School.

Powell was awarded the Medal of the Order of Australia (OAM) in the 1997 Australia Day Honours and the Australian Sports Medal in June 2000.
