= Kim Myung-ok =

South Korean field hockey player

Medal record

Women's field hockey

Representing South Korea

Olympic Games
Silver medal – second place	1996 Atlanta	Team

Asian Games
Gold medal – first place	1994 Hiroshima	Team
Gold medal – first place	1998 Bangkok	Team

Kim Myung-Ok (born 17 September 1972) is a former South Korean field hockey player who competed in the 1996 Summer Olympics and the 2000 Summer Olympics.
