= Lee Eun-young (field hockey) =

South Korean field hockey player

Medal record

Women's field hockey

Representing South Korea

Olympic Games
Silver medal – second place	1996 Atlanta	Team

Asian Games
Gold medal – first place	1994 Hiroshima	Team
Gold medal – first place	1998 Bangkok	Team
Silver medal – second place	2002 Busan	Team

Asia Cup
Gold medal – first place	1999 New Delhi	

Lee Eun-Young (born 7 July 1974) is a South Korean former field hockey player who competed in the 1996 Summer Olympics and in the 2000 Summer Olympics, winning the silver medal in 1996.
