= Karina Masotta =

Argentine field hockey player

Personal information
- Born: March 5, 1971 (age 55)
Medal record
Women's field hockey
Representing Argentina
Olympic Games
Silver medal – second place	2000 Sydney	Team
World Cup
Gold medal – first place	2002 Perth
Silver medal – second place	1994 Dublin
Pan American Games
Gold medal – first place	1991 Havana
Gold medal – first place	1995 Mar de Plata
Gold medal – first place	1999 Winnipeg
Champions Trophy
Gold medal – first place	2001 Amstelveen
Silver medal – second place	2002 Macau
Pan American Cup
Gold medal – first place	2001 Kingston

Paula Karina Masotta Biagetti (born March 5, 1971, in Buenos Aires) is a retired field hockey player from Argentina, who won the silver medal with the national field hockey team at the 2000 Summer Olympics. She also won the Champions Trophy in 2001, the 2002 World Cup, the Pan American Cup in 2001 and three Pan American Games.
