= Jeannette Lewin =

Dutch field hockey player

Personal information
- Born: 27 February 1972 (age 54)
Medal record
Women's field hockey
Representing the Netherlands
Olympic Games
Bronze medal – third place	1996 Atlanta	Team competition
World Cup
Silver medal – second place	1998 Utrecht	Team Competition
Champions Trophy
Silver medal – second place	1993 Amstelveen	Team competition
Bronze medal – third place	1991 Berlin	Team Competition
Euro Nations Cup
Gold medal – first place	1995 Amstelveen	Team Competition

Jeannette Marianne Lewin (born 27 February 1972 in Vianen, South Holland) is a former field hockey midfield player from the Netherlands, who played a total number of 114 international matches for the Dutch National Women's Team, in which she scored twelve goals.

She made her début on 14 December 1990 in a friendly against England (3-1), and won the bronze medal with Holland at the 1996 Summer Olympics. Lewin retired after having won the silver medal at the 1998 Women's Hockey World Cup in Utrecht. She later married former Dutch field hockey international Leo Klein Gebbink.
