= Barbara Marois =

American field hockey player

Personal information
- Born: March 1, 1963 (age 63) Auburn, Massachusetts
Medal record
Women's field hockey
Representing the United States
Champions Trophy
Bronze medal – third place	1995 Mar del Plata	Team competition
Pan American Games
Silver medal – second place	1987 Indianapolis	Team competition
Silver medal – second place	1995 Mar del Plata	Team competition
Bronze medal – third place	1991 Havana	Team competition

Barbara "Barb" Marois (born March 1, 1963, in Auburn, Massachusetts) is a former field hockey player from the United States, who was a member of the US women's team that finished fifth at the 1996 Summer Olympics in Atlanta, Georgia.
