= Lucía López =

Spanish field hockey player (born 1974)

Personal information
- Born: 31 January 1974 (age 52)
Medal record
Women's field hockey
Representing Spain
Champions Challenge
Silver medal – second place	2003 Catania	Team competition
European Nations Cup
Silver medal – second place	1995 Amstelveen	Team Competition

Lucía López Martínez (born 31 January 1974 in Barcelona) is a former female field hockey player from Spain. She was a member of the Women's National Team at three consecutive Summer Olympics, starting in 1996. She played club hockey for Real Club de Polo in Barcelona.
