= Tracey Fuchs =

American field hockey player

Personal information
- Born: November 3, 1966 (age 59) Centereach, New York
Medal record
Women's field hockey
Representing the United States
Pan American Games
Silver medal – second place	2003 Santo Domingo	Team Competition
Champions Trophy
Bronze medal – third place	1995 Mar del Plata	Team Competition

Tracey Claire Fuchs (born November 3, 1966) is a former field hockey midfielder from the United States, who was a member of the US women's team that finished fifth at the 1996 Summer Olympics in Atlanta, Georgia. She also competed in the 1988 Summer Olympics in Seoul, where Team USA finished in eighth and last position. She also played for the 1994 World Cup team that won the bronze medal. She won a bronze medal at the 1995 Pan American Games. Fuchs won the NCAA Division I national title as the coach of the Northwestern Wildcats in 2021, 2024, and 2025.

== Life ==
A former street hockey player on Long Island, she became a force on her high school field hockey team for Centereach Cougars. She was the last of four sisters — Dana, Jill and Lauren were the others — who were all team captains.

Fuchs scored 82 goals her senior year, the National Federation record. She finished her high school career with 171 goals, second all-time.

She went to the University of Connecticut where she paid the Huskies immediate dividends, winning an NCAA championship in her second season. She was a three-time All-American and won the 1987 Honda-Broderick Award, which recognizes the national player of the year.

Fuchs' international career started strongly as the USA qualified for the 1988 Summer Olympics in Seoul, then won silver in the 1994 World Cup. She was named USA Field Hockey's Athlete of the Year in 1990 and 1995. She and the rest of the national-team pool prepared for an entire year in Atlanta before the 1996 Olympics. The team finished fifth.

She missed the 2002 World Cup because of the terrorist attacks of September 11, 2001. The U.S. team was stranded in the USA while the rest of the teams were in France.

This sent Fuchs and the American team on a five-continent, 10,000-mile journey to earn the 16th and final qualification place for the World Cup. At the end, in a three-game series against India played in Cannock, England, Fuchs led the way for the United States with a pair of second-half goals in the third and final match as the Americans won 3–1. She participated at the 2003 Pan American Games in Santo Domingo, Dominican Republic.

Fuchs was capped "280 something" times over 17 years, scoring 69 goals.

She is now the head field hockey coach at Northwestern University and was on the coaching staff for Team USA at the 2006 World Cup in Madrid.
