= Ellen Kuipers =

Dutch field hockey player

Personal information
- Born: 8 April 1971 (age 55)
Medal record
Women's field hockey
Representing the Netherlands
Olympic Games
| Bronze medal – third place | 1996 Atlanta | Team competition |
World Cup
| Silver medal – second place | 1998 Utrecht | Team Competition |
Champions Trophy
| Bronze medal – third place | 1997 Berlin | Team Competition |
Euro Nations Cup
| Gold medal – first place | 1995 Amstelveen | Team Competition |

Ellen Marchien Dubbeldam-Kuipers (born 8 April 1971 in Hattem, Gelderland) is a former field hockey forward from the Netherlands, who played a total number of 94 international matches for the Dutch National Women's Team, in which she scored 32 goals. She made her debut on 17 June 1994 in a friendly against Germany, and won the bronze medal at the 1996 Summer Olympics. Kuipers retired from international competition after the 1998 World Cup in Utrecht. Post retirement, her interests lie in branding and interior design.
