= Franziska Hentschel =

German field hockey player

Personal information
- Born: Franziska Constanze Hentschel; 29 June 1970 (age 56) Stuttgart, Baden-Württemberg
- Height: 170 cm (5 ft 7 in)
- Weight: 70 kg (154 lb)

Sport
- Sport: Field hockey
Medal record
Women's field hockey
Representing Germany
Olympic Games
| Silver medal – second place | 1992 Barcelona | Team competition |
Champions Trophy
| Silver medal – second place | 1991 Berlin | Team competition |
| Bronze medal – third place | 1993 Amstelveen | Team competition |
European Nations Cup
| Bronze medal – third place | 1995 Amstelveen | Team Competition |

Franziska Constanze Sanner (née Hentschel, born 29 June 1970 in Stuttgart, Baden-Württemberg) is a former field hockey forward from Germany.

Hentschel was a member of the Women's National Team that won the silver medal at the 1992 Summer Olympics in Barcelona, Spain. She competed in two consecutive Summer Olympics for her native country, starting in 1992.
