= Jane Sixsmith =

British field hockey player

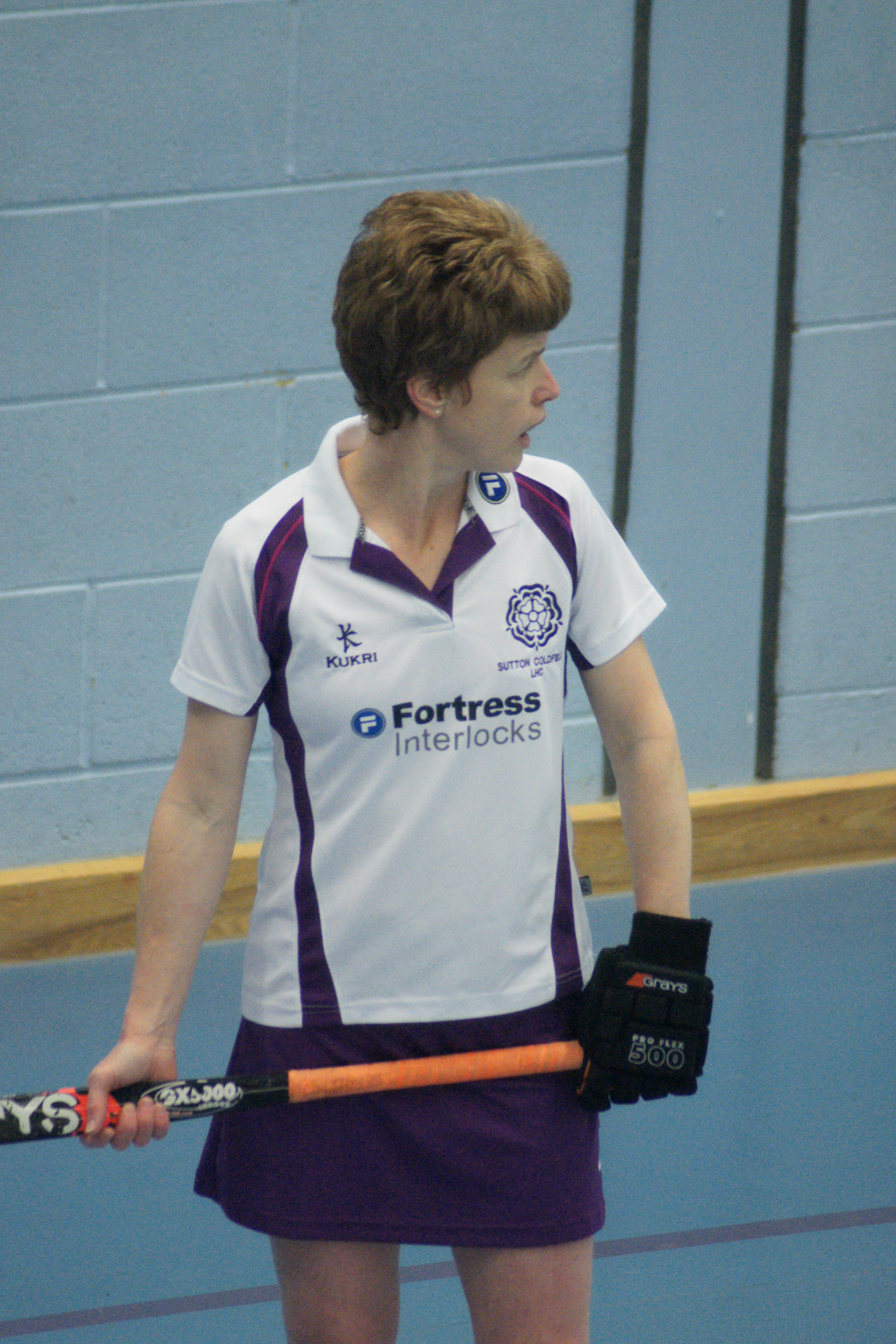
- Sixsmith in 2010

Personal information
- Full name: Janet Theresa Sixsmith
- Born: 5 September 1967 (age 58) Sutton Coldfield, Birmingham, West Midlands

Sport
- Sport: Field hockey
Medal record
Women's field hockey
Representing Great Britain
Olympic Games
Bronze medal – third place	1992 Barcelona	Team
Representing England
Commonwealth Games
Silver medal – second place	1998 Kuala Lumpur	Team
European Nations Cup
Gold medal – first place	1991 Brussels	Team
Silver medal – second place	1987 London	Team
Bronze medal – third place	1999 Cologne	Team

Janet Theresa "Jane" Sixsmith MBE (born 5 September 1967 in Sutton Coldfield, Birmingham, West Midlands) is a field hockey player, who was a member of the British squad that won the bronze medal at the 1992 Summer Olympics in Barcelona. She retired from the international scene after scoring over hundred goals and winning 165 caps for England and 158 for Great Britain. Sixsmith was the first British female hockey player to have appeared at four Olympic Games, followed by Kate Richardson-Walsh including the 2000 Summer Olympics in Sydney, Australia. Jane continues to play National League for Sutton Coldfield Hockey Club.

Sixsmith took up hockey when, at the age of twelve, she was told she could no longer play for a boys' football team. She played hockey at club level for her hometown, Sutton Coldfield. As a teenager, she was selected as a reserve for the England under-18 netball team before being chosen for England's under-18 hockey squad. Jane attended St Joseph's Catholic Primary School and Bishop Walsh Catholic School.

Jane recently took part in the 2013 Maxifuels Super Sixes indoor hockey finals with her team Sutton Coldfield. They reached the final after beating Bowden Hightown in the Semi Finals. Jane scored the second goal in her team's 2–5 defeat to champions Reading HC in the final at Wembley Arena on 27 January 2013.

Sixsmith's honours include an MBE, an Olympic bronze, a European Cup gold (1991) and a Commonwealth silver medal (1998).

== Private life ==
Sixsmith is married and has children. She works as a hockey coach for the English city Birmingham.
