= Wietske de Ruiter =

Dutch field hockey player

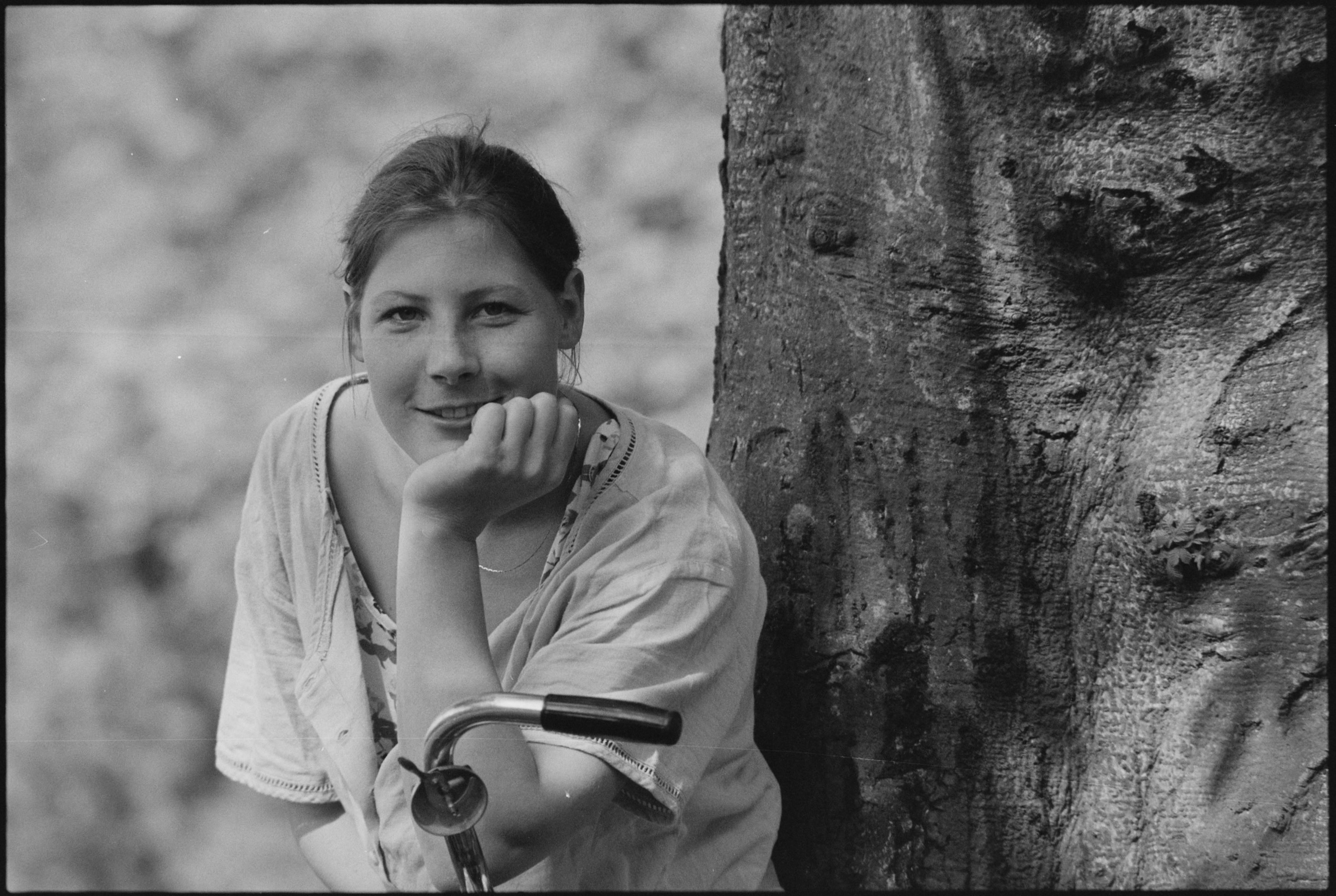

Personal information
- Born: 20 March 1970 (age 56)
Medal record
Women's field hockey
Representing the Netherlands
Olympic Games
Bronze medal – third place	1996 Atlanta	Team competition
World Cup
Gold medal – first place	1990 Sydney	Team competition
Champions Trophy
Bronze medal – third place	1991 Berlin	Team competition
European Nations Cup
Gold medal – first place	1995 Amstelveen	Team competition

Wietske Annechien de Ruiter (born 20 March 1970 in Ridderkerk) is a former female field hockey striker from the Netherlands, who represented her native country at two consecutive Summer Olympics: 1992 and 1996. At the last tournament in Atlanta, Georgia the former player of Hockey Vereniging Victoria in Rotterdam (where she started her career) and HGC won the bronze medal with the Dutch women's team.
