= Sofía MacKenzie =

Argentine field hockey player

Personal information
- Born: 20 June 1972 (age 54) Argentina
Medal record
Women's field hockey
Representing Argentina
World Cup
Silver medal – second place	1994 Dublin	Team competition
Pan American Games
Gold medal – first place	1991 Havana	Team competition
Gold medal – first place	1995 Mar de Plata	Team competition

Sofía Agnes MacKenzie (born June 20, 1972) is a former field hockey defender from Argentina who nearly played one hundred international matches for the Women's National Team. She was a member of the squad that finished in seventh place at the 1996 Summer Olympics in Atlanta, Georgia. At the 1998 Women's Hockey World Cup, she competed in her last international tournament.
