= Sonia Barrio =

Spanish field hockey player (born 1969)

Personal information
- Born: 13 December 1969 (age 56)
Medal record
Women's field hockey
Representing Spain
Olympic Games
| Gold medal – first place | 1992 Barcelona | Team competition |
European Nations Cup
| Silver medal – second place | 1995 Amstelveen | Team Competition |

Sonia Barrio Gutiérrez (born 13 December 1969 in Madrid) is a former field hockey player from Spain, who was a member of the Women's National Team that surprisingly won the golden medal at the 1992 Summer Olympics in Barcelona.

Barrio also competed in the 1996 Summer Olympics in Atlanta, Georgia, where Spain finished in 8th and last position. Four years later, when Sydney hosted the Games, she was a member of the team that was defeated by the Netherlands in the bronze medal match.
