= Vanessa van Kooperen =

German field hockey player

Vanessa Schmoranzer (van Kooperen) (born 27 July 1972 in Bergisch Gladbach) is a German former field hockey player who competed in the 1996 Summer Olympics.
