= Nagore Gabellanes =

Spanish field hockey player (born 1973)

Personal information
- Born: 25 January 1973 (age 53)
Medal record
Women's field hockey
Representing Spain
Olympic Games
Gold medal – first place	1992 Barcelona	Team competition
European Nations Cup
Silver medal – second place	1995 Amstelveen	Team Competition

Nagore Gabellanes Marieta (born 25 January 1973 in San Sebastián, Guipúzcoa) is a former field hockey player from Spain. She was a member of the Women's National Team that surprisingly won the golden medal at the 1992 Summer Olympics on home soil (Barcelona). She also competed in the 1996 Summer Olympics in Atlanta, Georgia, where Spain finished in 8th and last position.
