= Lee Eun-kyung (field hockey) =

South Korean field hockey player

Medal record

Women's field hockey

Representing South Korea

Olympic Games
Silver medal – second place	1996 Atlanta	Team

Asian Games
Gold medal – first place	1994 Hiroshima	Team

Lee Eun-Kyung (born 10 November 1972) is a South Korean former field hockey player who competed in the 1992 Summer Olympics and in the 1996 Summer Olympics.
