= 1991 Women's EuroHockey Nations Championship =

International field hockey competition

The 1991 Women's EuroHockey Nations Championship was the third edition of the women's field hockey championship organised by the European Hockey Federation. It was held in Brussels, Belgium from May 1–10, 1991. England won the final against Germany, winning their first European title with the help of two goals from striker Jane Sixsmith.

== Results ==
=== Pool A ===
| Team | Pld | W | D | L | GF | GA | GD | Pts |
|---|---|---|---|---|---|---|---|---|
| Germany | 5 | 5 | 0 | 0 | 18 | 3 | +15 | 10 |
| Netherlands | 5 | 4 | 0 | 1 | 20 | 3 | +17 | 8 |
| Ireland | 5 | 1 | 2 | 2 | 5 | 13 | –8 | 4 |
| Belgium | 5 | 0 | 3 | 2 | 3 | 8 | –5 | 3 |
| Wales | 5 | 0 | 3 | 2 | 2 | 12 | –10 | 3 |
| Italy | 5 | 0 | 2 | 3 | 2 | 11 | –9 | 2 |

1 May 1991
| Belgium | 0–0 | Italy |
2 May 1991
| Netherlands | 6–0 | Ireland |
| Germany | 4–0 | Wales |
3 May 1991
| Netherlands | 6–0 | Wales |
| Germany | 3–0 | Italy |
| Belgium | 1–1 | Ireland |
5 May 1991
| Ireland | 3–1 | Italy |
| Netherlands | 1–3 | Germany |
| Belgium | 1–1 | Wales |
6 May 1991
| Ireland | 0–0 | Wales |
| Netherlands | 4–0 | Italy |
| Germany | 3–1 | Belgium |
8 May 1991
| Italy | 1–1 | Wales |
| Netherlands | 3–0 | Belgium |
| Germany | 5–1 | Ireland |

=== Pool B ===
| Team | Pld | W | D | L | GF | GA | GD | Pts |
|---|---|---|---|---|---|---|---|---|
| England | 5 | 4 | 0 | 1 | 14 | 5 | +9 | 8 |
| Soviet Union | 5 | 3 | 0 | 2 | 15 | 7 | +8 | 6 |
| Spain | 5 | 3 | 0 | 2 | 11 | 5 | +6 | 6 |
| Scotland | 5 | 3 | 0 | 2 | 10 | 7 | +3 | 6 |
| France | 5 | 2 | 0 | 3 | 10 | 7 | +3 | 4 |
| Austria | 5 | 0 | 0 | 5 | 0 | 29 | –29 | 0 |

1 May 1991
| England | 5–0 | Austria |
| Spain | 1–0 | Soviet Union |
| Scotland | 2–1 | France |
2 May 1991
| Soviet Union | 9–0 | Austria |
| England | 3–0 | Scotland |
3 May 1991
| France | 2–0 | Spain |
4 May 1991
| England | 4–2 | Soviet Union |
| France | 4–0 | Austria |
| Scotland | 3–0 | Spain |
6 May 1991
| Soviet Union | 1–0 | France |
| Scotland | 3–0 | Austria |
| Spain | 2–0 | England |
7 May 1991
| Soviet Union | 3–2 | Scotland |
| Spain | 8–0 | Austria |
8 May 1991
| England | 2–1 | France |

=== Ninth to twelfth place classification ===
Crossover
10 May 1991
Wales | 6
Austria | 0
10 May 1991
France | 2
Italy | 1

Ninth place
11 May 1991
Wales | 3
France | 2
Eleventh place
11 May 1991
Italy | 5
Austria | 1

=== Fifth to eighth place classification ===
Crossover
10 May 1991
Spain | 5
Belgium | 1
10 May 1991
Scotland | 3
Ireland | 1

Fifth place
11 May 1991
Scotland | 2
Spain | 1
Seventh place
11 May 1991
Belgium | 2
Ireland | 0

=== First to fourth place classification ===
Semi-finals
10 May 1991
Germany (a.e.t.) | 2
Soviet Union | 1
10 May 1991
England (pen.) | 0 (3)
Netherlands | 0 (2)

Final
12 May 1991
England | 2
Germany | 1
Third place
12 May 1991
Soviet Union | 3
Netherlands | 2

== See also ==
- 1991 Men's EuroHockey Nations Championship
