= Chang Eun-jung =

South Korean field hockey player

- Hangul: 장은정
- Hanja: 張銀貞
- RR: Jang Eunjeong
- MR: Chang Ŭnjŏng

Chang Eun-jung
Medal record

Women's field hockey

Representing South Korea

Olympic Games
Silver medal – second place	1988 Seoul	Team
Silver medal – second place	1996 Atlanta	Team

Asian Games
Gold medal – first place	1990 Beijing	Team
Gold medal – first place	1994 Hiroshima	Team

Chang Eun-jung (born 18 August 1970) is a South Korean former field hockey player who competed in the 1988 Summer Olympics, in the 1992 Summer Olympics, and in the 1996 Summer Olympics.
