= María Castelli =

Argentine field hockey player

Medal record

Women's field hockey

Representing Argentina

Olympic Games

María Paula Castelli Deluca (born 23 November 1972) is an Argentine former field hockey player who competed in the 1996 Summer Olympics.
