= Lee Ji-young (field hockey) =

Olympic field hockey player

Medal record

Women's field hockey

Representing South Korea

Olympic Games
Silver medal – second place	1996 Atlanta	Team

Asian Games
Gold medal – first place	1994 Hiroshima	Team

Lee Ji-Young (born 26 November 1971) is a South Korean former field hockey player who competed in the 1996 Summer Olympics.
