= Kwon Chang-sook =

South Korean field hockey player

Medal record

Women's field hockey

Representing South Korea

Olympic Games
Silver medal – second place	1996 Atlanta	Team

Asian Games
Gold medal – first place	1990 Beijing	Team
Gold medal – first place	1994 Hiroshima	Team

Kwon Chang-Sook (born 4 May 1971) is a South Korean former field hockey player who competed in the 1992 Summer Olympics and in the 1996 Summer Olympics.
