= Cho Eun-jung =

South Korean field hockey player (born 1971)

- Hangul: 조은정
- Hanja: 趙恩正
- RR: Jo Eunjeong
- MR: Cho Ŭnjŏng

Cho Eun-jung
Medal record

Women's field hockey

Representing South Korea

Olympic Games
Silver medal – second place	1996 Atlanta	Team

Asian Games
Gold medal – first place	1994 Hiroshima	Team

Cho Eun-jung (born 22 September 1971) is a South Korean former field hockey player who competed in the 1996 Summer Olympics.

== Education ==
- Pyongtaek Girls' High School
