= Melanie Cremer =

German field hockey player

Personal information
- Born: 23 December 1970 (age 55); Düsseldorf
- Height: 162 cm (5 ft 4 in)
- Weight: 52 kg (115 lb)

Melanie Cremer (born 23 December 1970 in Düsseldorf) is a German former field hockey player who competed in the 1996 Summer Olympics.
