= 1995 Women's EuroHockey Nations Championship =

International field hockey competition

The 1995 Women's EuroHockey Nations Championship was the fourth edition of the women's field hockey championship organised by the European Hockey Federation. It was held in Amstelveen, Netherlands from June 14 to June 25, 1995. In the final host Netherlands defeated reigning Olympic champion Spain after penalty strokes to clinch its third title.

== Venue ==
- Wagener Stadium

== Umpires ==
- (United States) Judith Brinsfield
- (Argentina) Laura Crespo
- (Czech Republic) Jana Vudmanskova
- (Ireland) Mary Power
- (Netherlands) Renée Cohen
- (Scotland) Lynne Fotheringham
- (Germany) Ute Löwenstein
- (Zimbabwe) Alyson Dale
- (Netherlands) Renée Cohen
- (Japan) Kazuko Yasueda
- (Netherlands) Edna Rutten
- (Spain) Lourdes Santiago Pinar
- (Italy) Carla d'Alberto

== Preliminary round ==
=== Group A ===
	Team	Points	G	W	D	L	GF	GA	Diff
1.	England	10	5	5	0	0	19	0	+19
2.	Germany	8	5	4	0	1	25	2	+23
3.	Ireland	6	5	3	0	2	5	8	–3
4.	France	4	5	2	0	3	11	11	0
5.	Italy	1	5	0	1	4	1	12	–11
6.	Belgium	1	5	0	1	4	4	32	–28

- Wednesday June 14, 1995

Ireland	1 – 0	Italy

Belgium	0 – 9	England

Germany	3 – 1	France

- Thursday June 15, 1995

Italy	1 – 1	Belgium

England	4 – 0	France

- Friday June 16, 1995

Germany	4 – 0	Ireland

- Saturday June 17, 1995

France	4 – 0	Italy

Ireland	2 – 1	Belgium

England	1 – 0	Germany

- Monday June 19, 1995

Ireland	2 – 1	France

England	3 – 0	Italy

Germany	15 – 0	Belgium

- Tuesday June 20, 1995

Ireland	0 – 2	England

France	5 – 2	Belgium

- Wednesday June 21, 1995

Germany	3 – 0	Italy

=== Group B ===
	Team	Points	G	W	D	L	GF	GA	Diff
1.	Netherlands	10	5	5	0	0	24	0	+24
2.	Spain	8	5	4	0	1	15	2	+13
3.	Scotland	5	5	2	1	2	14	5	+9
4.	Russia	5	5	2	1	2	13	8	+5
5.	Czech Republic	2	5	1	0	4	2	23	–21
6.	Sweden	0	5	0	0	5	0	30	–30

- Thursday June 15, 1995

Scotland	3 – 1	Czech Republic

Spain	3 – 0	Russia

Netherlands	10 – 0	Sweden

- Friday June 16, 1995

Spain	4 – 0	Sweden

Russia	5 – 0	Czech Republic

Netherlands	1 – 0	Scotland

- Sunday June 18, 1995

Scotland	0 – 1	Spain

Netherlands	8 – 0	Czech Republic

Russia	6 – 0	Sweden

- Monday June 19, 1995

Spain	7 – 0	Czech Republic

- Tuesday June 20, 1995

Scotland	9 – 0	Sweden

Netherlands	3 – 0	Russia

- Wednesday June 21, 1995

Czech Republic	1 – 0	Sweden

Scotland	2 – 2	Russia

Netherlands	2 – 0	Spain

== Play-offs ==
- Friday June 23, 1995

5th/8th place

Russia	4 – 0	Ireland

5th/8th place

Scotland	3 – 0	France

1st/4th place

Spain	3 – 1	England

1st/4th place

Netherlands	2 – 1	Germany

- Saturday June 24, 1995

9th/12th place

Italy	4 – 0	Sweden

9th/12th place

Czech Republic	0 – 0 2 – 1 [aps]	Belgium

7th/8th place

France	1 – 1 4 – 3 [aps]	Ireland

5th/6th place

Russia	2 – 2 6 – 5 [aps]	Scotland

- Sunday June 25, 1995

11th/12th place

Belgium	6 – 0	Sweden

9th/10th place

Italy	1 – 0	Czech Republic

3rd/4th place

Germany	1 – 0	England

1st/2nd place

Netherlands	2 – 2 4 – 1 [aps]	Spain

== Awards ==
1995 EuroHockey Nations Championship winners

Netherlands
Third title
