= Canada at the 1992 Summer Olympics =

- IOC code: CAN
- NOC: Canadian Olympic Committee

in Barcelona
- Competitors: 295 (179 men and 116 women) in 24 sports
- Flag bearer: Mike Smith
- Medals Ranked 11th: Gold 7 Silver 4 Bronze 7 Total 18

Summer Olympics appearances (overview)
- 1900; 1904; 1908; 1912; 1920; 1924; 1928; 1932; 1936; 1948; 1952; 1956; 1960; 1964; 1968; 1972; 1976; 1980; 1984; 1988; 1992; 1996; 2000; 2004; 2008; 2012; 2016; 2020; 2024

Other related appearances
- 1906 Intercalated Games

Canada competed at the 1992 Summer Olympics in Barcelona, Spain, held from 25 July to 9 August 1992. 295 competitors, 179 men and 116 women, took part in 199 events in 24 sports.

The Barcelona Olympics were at the time Canada's second most successful Summer Olympic Games (and most successful in a fully-attended Olympics), subsequently surpassed in number of medals won in 1996 and 2016, and then tied in the number of gold medals in 2020.

== Medallists ==
Medal	Name	Sport	Event	Date
Gold	Mark Tewksbury	Swimming	Men's 100 metre backstroke	July 30
Gold	Kay Worthington; Kirsten Barnes; Jessica Monroe; Brenda Taylor	Rowing	Women's coxless four	August 1
Gold	Kathleen Heddle; Marnie McBean	Rowing	Women's coxless pair	August 1
Gold	Brenda Taylor; Lesley Thompson; Kay Worthington; Kathleen Heddle; Marnie McBean; Jessica Monroe; Kirsten Barnes; Shannon Crawford; Megan Delehanty	Rowing	Women's eight	August 2
Gold	Michael Rascher; Bruce Robertson; John Wallace; Robert Marland; Terrence Paul; Derek Porter; Darren Barber; Andrew Crosby; Mike Forgeron	Rowing	Men's eight	August 2
Gold	Mark McKoy	Athletics	Men's 110 metres hurles	August 3
Gold	Sylvie Fréchette	Synchronized swimming	Women's solo	August 6
Silver	Guillaume LeBlanc	Athletics	Men's 20 kilometres walk	July 31
Silver	Penny Vilagos; Vicky Vilagos	Synchronized swimming	Women's duet	August 5
Silver	Jeffrey Thue	Wrestling	Men's freestyle 130 kg	August 6
Silver	Mark Leduc	Boxing	Light welterweight	August 9
Bronze	Nicolas Gill	Judo	Men's 86 kg	July 29
Bronze	Curtis Harnett	Cycling	Men's sprint	July 31
Bronze	Mark Tewksbury; Stephen Clarke; Jonathan Cleveland; Marcel Gery; Tom Ponting (heats)	Swimming	Men's 4 × 100 metre medley relay	July 31
Bronze	Silken Laumann	Rowing	Women's single sculls	August 2
Bronze	Angela Chalmers	Athletics	Women's 3000 metres	August 2
Bronze	Eric Jespersen; Ross MacDonald	Sailing	Star	August 4
Bronze	Chris Johnson	Boxing	Middleweight	August 6

== Competitors ==
The following is the list of number of competitors in the Games.

Sport	Men	Women	Total
Archery	3	0	3
Athletics	27	21	48
Badminton	4	2	6
Boxing	10	—	10
Canoeing	11	7	18
Cycling	11	4	15
Diving	4	4	8
Equestrian	5	6	11
Fencing	11	5	16
Field hockey	0	15	15
Gymnastics	3	8	11
Judo	5	7	12
Modern pentathlon	2	—	2
Rowing	17	10	27
Sailing	12	4	16
Shooting	8	4	12
Swimming	15	13	28
Synchronized swimming	—	3	3
Table tennis	1	1	2
Tennis	3	2	5
Volleyball	12	0	12
Weightlifting	2	—	2
Wrestling	13	—	13
Total	179	116	295

== Archery ==
Canada sent only men to Barcelona for archery. Two of the three individuals did not qualify for the elimination rounds, nor did the team qualify for the team round.

Men

Athlete	Event	Ranking round		Round of 32	Round of 16	Quarterfinals	Semifinals	Final / BM	
Athlete	Event	Score	Seed	Opposition Score	Opposition Score	Opposition Score	Opposition Score	Opposition Score	Rank
Sylvain Cadieux	Individual	1227	60	Did not advance					
Jeannot Robitaille	Individual	1188	70	Did not advance					
Claude Rousseau	Individual	1286	22 Q	Ram (IND); W 102–100	Lipponen (FIN); L 99–102	Did not advance			
Sylvain Cadieux; Jeannot Robitaille; Claude Rousseau	Team	3701	19	Did not advance					

== Athletics ==
Men
Track and road events

Athlete	Event	Heats		Quarterfinal		Semifinal		Final	
Athlete	Event	Result	Rank	Result	Rank	Result	Rank	Result	Rank
Ben Johnson	100 metres	10.55	20 Q	10.30	10 Q	10.70	15	Did not advance	
Atlee Mahorn	100 metres	10.64	30 Q	10.77	32	Did not advance			
Bruny Surin	100 metres	10.37	10 Q	10.24	8 Q	10.21	5 Q	10.09	4
Atlee Mahorn	200 metres	21.01	18 Q	20.78	20	Did not advance			
Peter Ogilvie	200 metres	21.11	27 Q	20.77	19	Did not advance			
Anthony Wilson	200 metres	21.21	31 q	21.22	31	Did not advance			
Mike McLean	400 metres	47.75	50	Did not advance					
Freddie Williams	800 metres	1:48.20	26	—N/a		Did not advance			
Graham Hood	1500 metres	3:44.44	21 Q	—N/a		3:36.12	6 q	3:42.55	9
Brendan Matthias	5000 metres	14:01.57	36	—N/a				Did not advance	
Paul Williams	10,000 metres	29:01.67	30	—N/a				Did not advance	
Peter Maher	Marathon	—N/a						DNF	
Mark McKoy	110 metres hurdles	13.26	2 Q	13.27	2 Q	13.12	1 Q	13.12	1st place, gold medalist(s)
Mark Jackson	400 metres hurdles	49.18	19	—N/a		Did not advance			
Graeme Fell	3000 metres steeplechase	8:50.87	28	—N/a		Did not advance			
Ben Johnson; Glenroy Gilbert; Atlee Mahorn; Bruny Surin; Peter Ogilvie (heats)	4 × 100 metres relay	39.34	5 Q	—N/a		DNF		Did not advance	
Mark Jackson; Anthony Wilson; Mark Graham; Freddie Williams	4 × 400 metres relay	3:04.69	13	—N/a				Did not advance	
Tim Berrett	20 kilometres walk	—N/a						1:28:25	14
Guillaume LeBlanc	20 kilometres walk	—N/a						1:22:25	2nd place, silver medalist(s)
Tim Berrett	50 kilometres walk	—N/a						DQ	
Guillaume LeBlanc	50 kilometres walk	—N/a						DQ	

Field events

Athlete	Event	Qualification		Final	
Athlete	Event	Distance	Position	Distance	Position
Alex Zaliauskas	High jump	2.15	31	Did not advance	
Doug Wood	Pole vault	5.20	24	Did not advance	
Edrick Floréal	Long jump	7.62	28	Did not advance	
Ian James	Long jump	7.74	20	Did not advance	
Oral Ogilvie	Triple jump	NM		Did not advance	
Peter Dajia	Shot put	16.81	25	Did not advance	
Ray Lazdins	Discus throw	58.26	21	Did not advance	
Stephen Feraday	Javelin throw	70.94	29	Did not advance	

Combined events – Decathlon

Athlete	Event	100 m	LJ	SP	HJ	400 m	110H	DT	PV	JT	1500 m	Final	Rank
Mike Smith	Result	11.02	6.83	15.03	2.00	50.04	DNF						
Mike Smith	Points	856	774	792	803	813	DNF						

Women
Track and road events

Athlete	Event	Heats		Quarterfinal		Semifinal		Final	
Athlete	Event	Result	Rank	Result	Rank	Result	Rank	Result	Rank
Karen Clarke	100 metres	11.79	36	Did not advance					
Karen Clarke	200 metres	23.57	23 Q	23.80	28	Did not advance			
Jillian Richardson	400 metres	51.99	2 Q	50.95	7 Q	50.02	4 Q	49.93	5
Charmaine Crooks	800 metres	1:59.52	3 q	—N/a		1:58.55	10	Did not advance	
Debbie Bowker	1500 metres	4:11.27	23 Q	—N/a		4:12.50	22	Did not advance	
Angela Chalmers	1500 metres	4:07.75	6 Q	—N/a		4:04.87	14	Did not advance	
Paula Schnurr	1500 metres	4:09.99	17 Q	—N/a		4:04.80	13	Did not advance	
Angela Chalmers	3000 metres	8:42.85	3 Q	—N/a				8:47.22	3rd place, bronze medalist(s)
Robyn Meagher	3000 metres	8:49.72	15	—N/a				Did not advance	
Leah Pells	3000 metres	9:13.19	27	—N/a				Did not advance	
Lisa Harvey	10,000 metres	33:55.93	34	—N/a				Did not advance	
Carole Rouillard	10,000 metres	32:53.83	22	—N/a				Did not advance	
Lizanne Bussières	Marathon	—N/a						DNF	
Odette Lapierre	Marathon	—N/a						2:46:18	19
Katie Anderson	100 metres hurdles	13.33	22 q	13.31	20	Did not advance			
Donalda Duprey	400 metres hurdles	56.37	16 q	—N/a		56.30	15	Did not advance	
Rosey Edeh	400 metres hurdles	55.66	13 q	—N/a		55.76	13	Did not advance	
Rosey Edeh; Charmaine Crooks; Camille Noel; Jillian Richardson; Karen Clarke (heats)	4 × 400 metres relay	3:26.09	6 q	—N/a				3:25.20	4
Pascale Grand	10 kilometres walk	—N/a						49:14	29
Janice McCaffrey	10 kilometres walk	—N/a						48:05	25
Tina Poitras	10 kilometres walk	—N/a						46:50	21

Field events

Athlete	Event	Qualification		Final	
Athlete	Event	Distance	Position	Distance	Position
Georgette Reed	Shot put	15.33	16	Did not advance	

Combined events – Heptathlon

Athlete	Event	100H	HJ	SP	200 m	LJ	JT	800 m	Total	Rank
Catherine Bond-Mills	Result	14.31	1.76	12.96	25.01	6.01	43.30	2:18.84	5897	21
Catherine Bond-Mills	Points	935	928	725	886	853	731	839	5897	21

== Badminton ==
Men

Athlete	Event	Round of 64	Round of 32	Round of 16	Quarterfinals	Semifinals	Final	
Athlete	Event	Opposition Result	Opposition Result	Opposition Result	Opposition Result	Opposition Result	Opposition Result	Rank
Bryan Blanshard	Singles	Lee (USA); W 15–3, 15–1	Stuer-Lauridsen (DEN); L 7–15, 4–15	Did not advance				
David Humble	Singles	Hall (GBR); L 6–15, 4–15	Did not advance					
Anil Kaul	Singles	Balaban (ROU); W 15–7, 15–4	Wu (CHN); L 7–15, 2–15	Did not advance				
Bryan Blanshard; Mike Bitten	Doubles	—N/a	Chen / Chen (CHN); L 6–15, 12–15	Did not advance				
Anil Kaul; David Humble	Doubles	—N/a	Fuchs / Koch (AUT); W 15–11, 15–11	Paulsen / Svarrer (DEN); L 5–15, 4–15	Did not advance			

Women

Athlete	Event	Round of 64	Round of 32	Round of 16	Quarterfinals	Semifinals	Final	
Athlete	Event	Opposition Result	Opposition Result	Opposition Result	Opposition Result	Opposition Result	Opposition Result	Rank
Denyse Julien	Singles	von Heiland (USA); W 11–2, 11–0	van der Knaap (NED); W 9–12, 11–3, 11–9	Tang (CHN); L 9–12, 0–11	Did not advance			
Doris Piché	Singles	Lacinová (TCH); W 11–0, 11–2	Schmidt (GER); W 11–5, 11–8	Lee (KOR); L 8–11, 2–11	Did not advance			
Denyse Julien; Doris Piché	Doubles	—N/a	Stuer-Lauridsen / Thomsen (DEN); L 15–9, 16–18, 14–18	Did not advance				

== Boxing ==
Athlete	Event	Round of 32	Round of 16	Quarterfinals	Semifinals	Final	
Athlete	Event	Opposition Result	Opposition Result	Opposition Result	Opposition Result	Opposition Result	Rank
Domenic Figliomeni	Light flyweight	Sasaki (JPN); L 3–5	Did not advance				
Marty O'Donnell	Flyweight	Peden (AUS); L 2–14	Did not advance				
Mike Strange	Featherweight	Kamsing (THA); L 9–11	Did not advance				
Billy Irwin	Lightweight	Vaughan (GBR); W RSC R3	Chavez (PHI); L 0–8	Did not advance			
Mark Leduc	Light welterweight	Wakaabu (UGA); W 9–2	Carew (GUY); W 5–0	Bouneb (ALG); W 8–1	Doroftei (ROU); W 13–6	Vinent (CUB); L 1–11	2nd place, silver medalist(s)
Ray Downey	Light middleweight	Simangunsong (INA); L 5–12	Did not advance				
Chris Johnson	Middleweight	Bye	Siluvangi (ZAI); W RSC R3	Trendafilov (BUL); W RSC R1	Byrd (USA); L 3–17	Did not advance	3rd place, bronze medalist(s)
Dale Brown	Light heavyweight	Zul (MGL); W RSC R2	May (GER); L 1–7	Did not advance			
Kirk Johnson	Heavyweight	Bye	Akhasamba (KEN); W RSC R2	Izonritei (NGR); L 5–9	Did not advance		
Tom Glesby	Super heavyweight	Bye	Balado (CUB); L 2–16	Did not advance			

== Canoeing ==
=== Slalom ===
Athlete	Event	Run 1	Rank	Run 2	Rank	Best	Rank
Daniel Norman	Men's C-1	157.80	29	167.54	28	157.80	30
Larry Norman	Men's C-1	146.65	23	128.96	16	128.96	19
Roy Sharplin	Men's C-1	135.71	19	144.48	24	135.71	22
David Ford	Men's K-1	112.70	12	115.32	11	112.70	15
Patrice Gagnon	Men's K-1	116.25	15	118.79	18	116.25	21
Sheryl Boyle	Women's K-1	156.09	19	166.66	20	156.09	22
Margaret Langford	Women's K-1	145.36	10	178.77	21	145.36	15
Joanne Woods	Women's K-1	138.06	4	151.08	16	138.06	8

=== Sprint ===
Men

Athlete	Event	Heats		Repechage		Semifinals		Final	
Athlete	Event	Time	Rank	Time	Rank	Time	Rank	Time	Rank
Stephen Giles	C-1 500 metres	1:53.50	1 SF	Bye		1:54.94	5 q	1:55.80	6
Stephen Giles	C-1 1000 metres	4:03.34	1 SF	Bye		4:08.05	2 Q	4:17.12	9
Larry Cain; David Frost	C-2 500 metres	1:43.12	4 SF	—N/a		1:42.35	2 Q	1:45.76	9
Larry Cain; David Frost	C-2 1000 metres	3:38.84	5 SF	—N/a		3:40.86	3 q	3:46.21	7
Renn Crichlow	K-1 500 metres	1:41.39	1 SF'	Bye		1:43.06	5	Did not advance	
Renn Crichlow	K-1 1000 metres	3:39.86	2 SF	Bye		3:38.40	5 q	3:43.46	8
Kenneth Padvaiskas; Jason Rusu	K-2 500 metres	1:34.33	3 R	1:32.11	3 Q	1:34.06	9	Did not advance	
Kenneth Padvaiskas; Jason Rusu	K-2 1000 metres	3:21.09	2 SF	Bye		3:24.14	7	Did not advance	

Women

Athlete	Event	Heats		Semifinals		Final	
Athlete	Event	Time	Rank	Time	Rank	Time	Rank
Caroline Brunet	K-1 500 metres	1:56.32	2	1:52.69	3 Q	1:54.82	7
Alison Herst; Klara MacAskill	K-2 500 metres	1:43.73	1	1:42.30	2 Q	1:42.14	5
Caroline Brunet; Alison Herst; Klara MacAskill; Kevyn Stafford	K-4 500 metres	1:36.34	4 SF	1:37.86	1 Q	1:42.28	6

== Cycling ==
Fifteen cyclists, eleven men and four women, represented Canada in 1992. Curt Harnett won bronze in the men's sprint.

=== Road ===
Men

Athlete	Event	Time	Rank
Jacques Landry	Road race	4:35:56	62
Nathael Sagard	Road race	4:35:56	41
Gianni Vignaduzzi	Road race	4:35:56	26
Colin Davidson; Chris Koberstein; Todd McNutt; Yvan Waddell	Team time trial	2:10:33	13

Women

Athlete	Event	Time	Rank
Maria Hawkins	Road race	2:05:33	36
Alison Sydor	Road race	2:05:03	12
Kelly-Ann Way	Road race	2:05:03	31

=== Track ===
Sprint

Athlete	Event	Qualification		Round 1	Repechage		Round 2	Repechage 2	Quarterfinals	Semifinals	Final	
Athlete	Event	Qualification		Round 1	Round 1	Round 2	Round 2	Repechage 2	Quarterfinals	Semifinals	Final	
Athlete	Event	Time Speed (km/h)	Rank	Opposition Time Speed (km/h)	Opposition Time Speed (km/h)	Opposition Time Speed (km/h)	Opposition Time Speed (km/h)	Opposition Time Speed (km/h)	Opposition Time Speed (km/h)	Opposition Time Speed (km/h)	Opposition Time Speed (km/h)	Rank
Curt Harnett	Men's sprint	10.368	3 Q	Kovsh (EUN), Cheeseman (TTO); W 11.248	Bye		Andrews (NZL), Carpenter (USA); W 10.994	Bye	Kovsh (EUN); W, W	Neiwand (AUS); L, L	Chiappa (ITA); W, W	3rd place, bronze medalist(s)
Tanya Dubnicoff	Women's sprint	11.773	5	Yenyukhina (EUN); W 12.416	Bye	—N/a			Neumann (GER); L, L	—N/a	Yenyukhina (EUN), Kuroki (JPN); L	6

Time trial

Athlete	Event	Time	Rank
Kurt Innes	Time trial	1:08.593	23

Pursuit

Athlete	Event	Qualification		Quarterfinals	Semifinals	Final	
Athlete	Event	Time	Rank	Opposition Time	Opposition Time	Opposition Time	Rank
Michael Belcourt	Men's individual pursuit	4:43.135	15 QB	Beltrami (ITA); L 4:42.441	—N/a		16
Kelly-Ann Way	Women's individual pursuit	3:54.284	14	Did not advance			

Points race

Athlete	Event	Qualification			Final		
Athlete	Event	Laps	Points	Rank	Laps	Points	Rank
John Malois	Points race	–1 lap	1	18	Did not advance		

== Diving ==
Men

Athlete	Event	Qualification		Final	
Athlete	Event	Points	Rank	Points	Rank
David Bédard	3 m springboard	372.54	13	Did not advance	
Mark Rourke	3 m springboard	379.32	9 Q	540.66	11
Bruno Fournier	10 m platform	370.68	14	Did not advance	
William Hayes	10 m platform	324.39	21	Did not advance	

Women

Athlete	Event	Qualification		Final	
Athlete	Event	Points	Rank	Points	Rank
Evelyne Boisvert	3 m springboard	258.09	21	Did not advance	
Mary DePiero	3 m springboard	278.76	12 Q	449.49	8
Paige Gordon	10 m platform	283.11	16	Did not advance	
Anne Montminy	10 m platform	282.42	17	Did not advance	

== Equestrian ==
=== Dressage ===
Athlete	Horse	Event	Qualification		Final	
Athlete	Horse	Event	Score	Rank	Score	Rank
Christilot Hanson-Boylen	Biraldo	Individual	1543	12	1347	12
Cynthia Neale-Ishoy	Dakar	Individual	1466	34	Did not advance	
Martina Pracht	Emirage	Individual	1313	48	Did not advance	
Christilot Hanson-Boylen; Cynthia Neale-Ishoy; Martina Pracht	See above	Team	—N/a		4322	10

=== Eventing ===
Athlete	Horse	Event	Dressage		Cross-country			Jumping			Total	
Athlete	Horse	Event	Penalties	Rank	Penalties	Total	Rank	Penalties	Total	Rank	Penalties	Rank
Nick Holmes-Smith	Sir Lancelot	Individual	65.20	44	128.40	193.60	60	10.00	203.60	24	203.60	53
Rachel Hunter	King Plantagenet	Individual	80.20	71	101.60	181.80	50	15.00	196.80	42	196.80	49
Robert Stevenson	Risky Business	Individual	60.80	26	48.40	109.20	20	20.00	129.20	48	129.20	22
Stuart Young-Black	Von Perrier	Individual	54.80	15	66.80	121.60	33	DNF				
Nick Holmes-Smith; Rachel Hunter; Robert Stevenson; Stuart Young-Black	See above	Team	180.80	9	216.80	412.60	11	45.00	529.60	11	529.60	12

=== Jumping ===
Athlete	Horse	Event	Qualification								Final					
Athlete	Horse	Event	Round 1		Round 2		Round 3		Total		Round 1		Round 2		Total	
Athlete	Horse	Event	Score	Rank	Score	Rank	Score	Rank	Score	Rank	Penalties	Rank	Penalties	Rank	Penalties	Rank
Jennifer Foster	Zeus	Individual	70.50	13	50.50	37	71.00	17	192.00	10 Q	28.75	41	Did not advance			
Jay Hayes	Zucarlos	Individual	56.00	29	56.00	28	82.00	6	194.00	9 Q	12.00	26	Did not advance			
Ian Millar	Big Ben	Individual	42.00	43	72.50	8	DNF		114.50	54	Did not advance					
Beth Underhill	Monopoly	Individual	15.00	73	0.00	78	DNS		15.00	81	Did not advance					
Jennifer Foster; Jay Hayes; Ian Millar; Beth Underhill	See above	Team	—N/a								24.00	10	20.25	9	44.25	9

== Fencing ==
16 fencers, 11 men and 5 women, represented Canada in 1992.

Individual
Pool stage

Athlete	Event	Group Stage						
Athlete	Event	Opposition Result	Opposition Result	Opposition Result	Opposition Result	Opposition Result	Opposition Result	Rank
Benoît Giasson	Men's foil	Betancourt (CUB); L 2–5	Lhôtellier (FRA); L 4–5	Abe (JPN); L 0–5	Lo (HKG); W 5–4	El-Khoury (LBN); W 5–1	—N/a	40 Q
Jean-Marc Chouinard	Men's épée	Henry (FRA); L 3–5	Kim (KOR); W 5–1	Kuhn (SUI); L 5–5	Nawrocki (POL); W 5–2	van Garderen (RSA); W 5–2	Sandegren (SWE); L 3–5	28 Q
Danek Nowosielski	Men's épée	Cuomo (ITA); L 3–5	Pantelimon (ROU); W 5–4	Hegedűs (HUN); W 5–2	Tanabe (JPN); W 5–3	Torrente (RSA); W 5–1	de la Peña (ESP); L 1–5	23 Q
Laurie Shong	Men's épée	Mazzoni (ITA); L 4–5	Depta (TCH); W 5–3	Lenzun (INA); W 5–1	Lang (SUI); W 5–1	Papaiano (BRA); W 5–0	Paz (COL); L 3–5	12 Q
Jean-Marie Banos	Men's sabre	Nolte (GER); L 3–5	Szabo (ROU); W 5–4	Mormando (USA); W 5–3	Menalda (BRA); W 5–3	Gniewkowski (POL); L 4–5	—N/a	19 Q
Jean-Paul Banos	Men's sabre	Becker (GER); L 4–5	Olech (POL); L 2–5	Yang (CHN); L 2–5	Meglio (ITA); W 5–2	Mullins (CRC); W 5–3	—N/a	32 Q
Tony Plourde	Men's sabre	Scalzo (ITA); L 4–5	Ducheix (FRA); L 4–5	Babanasis (GRE); L 4–5	Pogosov (EUN); L 3–5	Lofton (USA); W 5–1	van Garderen (RSA); W 5–4	35
Renée Aubin	Women's foil	Mincza (HUN); L 3–5	Xiao (CHN); L 1–5	Czuckermann-Hatuel (ISR); L 3–5	Dobmeier (GER); L 2–5	McIntosh (GBR); W 5–4	—N/a	35 Q
Thalie Tremblay	Women's foil	Zalaffi (ITA); L 0–5	Maciejewska (POL); W 5–3	Lee (KOR); W 5–2	Takayanagi (JPN); W 5–3	Botha (RSA); W 5–3	Meygret (FRA); L 2–5	18 Q

Elimination phase

Athlete	Event	Round 1	Round 2	Round 3	Round 4	Repechage				Quarterfinals	Semifinals	Final	
Athlete	Event	Round 1	Round 2	Round 3	Round 4	Round 1	Round 2	Round 3	Round 4	Quarterfinals	Semifinals	Final	
Athlete	Event	Opposition Result	Opposition Result	Opposition Result	Opposition Result	Opposition Result	Opposition Result	Opposition Result	Opposition Result	Opposition Result	Opposition Result	Opposition Result	Rank
Benoît Giasson	Men's foil	You (KOR); L 0–2	Did not advance										
Jean-Marc Chouinard	Men's épée	Maroto (ESP); W 2–0	Rivas (COL); L 1–2	Did not advance		Jacquet (SUI); W 2–0	Henry (FRA); L 0–2	Did not advance					
Danek Nowosielski	Men's épée	McLean (NZL); W 2–1	Felisiak (GER); L 0–2	Did not advance		Lundblad (SWE); W 2–1	Shuvalov (EUN); L 0–2	Did not advance					
Laurie Shong	Men's épée	Bye	Depta (TCH); W 2–0	Srecki (FRA); L 0–2	Did not advance	Bye	Davidson (AUS); W 2–1	Mazzoni (ITA); L 0–2	Did not advance				
Jean-Marie Banos	Men's sabre	Bye	Ducheix (FRA); L 0–2	Did not advance		Cottingham (USA); L 0–2	Did not advance						
Jean-Paul Banos	Men's sabre	Mormando (USA); W 2–0	Nébald (HUN); W 2–0	Nolte (GER); L 0–2	Did not advance	Bye	Daurelle (FRA); L 0–2	Did not advance					
Renée Aubin	Women's foil	Takayanagi (JPN); W 2–0	Jánosi (HUN); L 0–2	Did not advance		Grigorescu (ROU); L 0–2	Did not advance						
Thalie Tremblay	Women's foil	Bye	Maciejewska (POL); W 2–0	McIntosh (GBR); L 0–2	Did not advance	Bye	Bortolozzi (ITA); W 2–1	Jánosi (HUN); L 0–2	Did not advance				

Team

Athlete	Event	Group Stage			Quarterfinals	Semifinals	Final	
Athlete	Event	Opposition Result	Opposition Result	Rank	Opposition Result	Opposition Result	Opposition Result	Rank
Jean-Marc Chouinard; Alain Côté; Allan Francis; Danek Nowosielski; Laurie Shong	Men's épée	Italy; L 4–7	Poland; W 9–4	2 Q	Hungary; L 8–8	Spain; L 3–9	Sweden; W 9–5	7
Jean-Marie Banos; Jean-Paul Banos; Evens Gravel; Leszek Nowosielski; Tony Plourde	Men's sabre	Unified Team; L 4–9	Hungary; L 5–9	3	Did not advance			
Renée Aubin; Hélène Bourdages; Marie-Françoise Hervieu; Thalie Tremblay; Shelley Wetterberg	Women's foil	Germany; L 0–9	Romania; L 0–9	3	Did not advance			

== Gymnastics ==
=== Artistic ===
==== Men ====
Qualification

Athlete	Event	Qualification							
Athlete	Event	Apparatus						Total	Rank
Athlete	Event	F	PH	R	V	PB	HB	Total	Rank
Curtis Hibbert	Individual	18.675	18.750	18.650	19.100	19.025	19.225	113.425	46 q
Mike Inglis	Individual	18.100	17.400	17.575	18.575	18.075	18.175	107.900	86
Alan Nolet	Individual	18.725	18.525	18.625	18.600	18.050	18.650	111.175	78

Individual finals

Athlete	Event	Qualification							
Athlete	Event	Apparatus						Total	Rank
Athlete	Event	F	PH	R	V	PB	HB	Total	Rank
Curtis Hibbert	Individual	8.200	9.050	9.500	9.300	9.025	9.050	54.125	36

==== Women ====
Team

Athlete	Event	Qualification					
Athlete	Event	Apparatus				Total	Rank
Athlete	Event	V	UB	BB	F	Total	Rank
Mylène Fleury	Team	19.037	19.212	18.412	19.162	75.823	77
Janet Morin	Team	9.750	9.700	9.650	9.687	38.787	92
Janine Rankin	Team	19.550	18.724	18.787	19.174	76.235	70
Lori Strong	Team	19.424	19.024	19.300	19.224	76.972	53
Stella Umeh	Team	19.712	19.625	19.437	19.587	78.361	25 Q
Jennifer Wood	Team	19.337	19.249	17.937	19.187	75.710	78
Total	Team	97.310	96.572	95.036	96.534	385.452	10

Individual finals

Athlete	Event	Apparatus				Total	Rank
Athlete	Event	V	UB	BB	F	Total	Rank
Stella Umeh	All-around	9.700	9.850	9.812	9.850	39.212	16

=== Rhythmic ===
Athlete	Event	Qualification						Final						
Athlete	Event	Hoop	Rope	Clubs	Ball	Total	Rank	Qualification	Hoop	Rope	Clubs	Ball	Total	Rank
Susan Cushman	Individual	9.150	8.850	8.875	8.900	35.775	29	Did not advance						
Madonna Gimotea	Individual	9.250	9.325	8.550	9.225	36.350	20	Did not advance						

== Hockey ==
Summary

Key:

- FT – After full time.
- P – Match decided by penalty-shootout.

Team	Event	Group stage				Semifinal	Final / BM	
Team	Event	Opposition Score	Opposition Score	Opposition Score	Rank	Opposition Score	Opposition Score	Rank
Canada women's	Women's tournament	Australia; L 0–2	Spain; L 1–2	Germany; L 0–4	4	Netherlands; L 0–2	New Zealand; W 2–0	7

=== Women's tournament ===
Team roster

Head coach: (Canada) Marina van der Merwe

No.	Pos.	Player	Date of birth (age)	Caps	Club
1		Deb Whitten	5 December 1966 (aged 25)		
2		Gaye Porteous	26 June 1965 (aged 27)		
3		Deb Covey	7 September 1961 (aged 30)		
4		Rochelle Low	19 May 1969 (aged 23)		
5		Tara Croxford	7 January 1968 (aged 24)		
6		Sandra Levy	12 March 1965 (aged 27)		
7		Sue Reid	10 November 1970 (aged 21)		
8		Heather Jones	8 October 1970 (aged 21)		
9		Candy Thomson	8 March 1967 (aged 25)		
10		Bernadette Bowyer	23 January 1966 (aged 26)		
11		Michelle Conn	17 September 1963 (aged 28)		
12		Laurelee Kopeck	17 July 1969 (aged 23)		
13		Joel Brough	9 February 1968 (aged 24)		
14		Milena Gaiga	30 August 1964 (aged 27)		
15		Sherri Field	13 March 1972 (aged 20)		
16		Sharon Creelman	27 April 1964 (aged 28)		

Group play

Teams	Pld	W	D	L	GF	GA	GD	Pts
Germany	3	2	1	0	7	2	+5	5
Spain	3	2	1	0	5	3	+2	5
Australia	3	1	0	2	2	2	0	2
Canada	3	0	0	3	1	8	−7	0

27 July 1992
16:00

Australia	2–0	Canada
Tooth 40'; Haslam 60'	Report

Umpires:
Dominique Ache (BEL)
Lee Mi-ok (KOR)

29 July 1992
18:00

Spain	2–1	Canada
Motos 5', 47'	Report	Covey 63'

Umpires:
Gill Clarke (GBR)
Jane Robertson (GBR)

2 August 1992
18:00

Canada	0–4	Germany
	Report	Dickenscheid 12'; Hentschel 16', 57'; Becker 22'

Umpires:
Renee Chatas (USA)
Dominique Ache (BEL)

Classification 5th-8th place

4 August 1992
17:30

Netherlands	2–0	Canada
Lejeune 55'; Steenberghe 61'	Report

Umpires:
Virginnia Davilla (ESP)
Gill Clarke (GBR)

7th place match

6 August 1992
09:30

New Zealand	0–2	Canada
	Report	Covey 45'; Gaiga 58'

Umpires:
Christianne Asselman (BEL)
Renee Chatas (USA)

== Judo ==
Men

Athlete	Event	Round of 64	Round of 32	Round of 16	Quarterfinals	Semifinals	Repechage				Final	
Athlete	Event	Round of 64	Round of 32	Round of 16	Quarterfinals	Semifinals	Round 1	Round 2	Round 3	Round 4	Final	
Athlete	Event	Opposition Result	Opposition Result	Opposition Result	Opposition Result	Opposition Result	Opposition Result	Opposition Result	Opposition Result	Opposition Result	Opposition Result	Rank
Ewan Beaton	60 kg	Bye	Trautmann (GER); L	Did not advance			Francini (SMR); W	Gough (IRL); W	Pradayrol (FRA); L	Did not advance		
Jean Pierre Cantin	65 kg	Raposo (DOM); W	Ioannou (CYP); W	Byala (IND); W	Quellmalz (GER); L	Did not advance	—N/a		Lorenzo (ESP); L	Did not advance		
Roman Hatashita	71 kg	Bye	Hajtós (HUN); L	Did not advance			—N/a	Boldbaatar (MGL); L	Did not advance			
Nicolas Gill	86 kg	Bye	Spijkers (NED); W	Wang (CHN); W	Okada (JPN); W	Legień (POL); L	—N/a				Croitoru (ROU); W	3rd place, bronze medalist(s)
Pat Roberge	95 kg	Aguirre (ARG); L	Did not advance									

Women

Athlete	Event	Round of 32	Round of 16	Quarterfinals	Semifinals	Repechage			Final	
Athlete	Event	Round of 32	Round of 16	Quarterfinals	Semifinals	Round 1	Round 2	Round 3	Final	
Athlete	Event	Opposition Result	Opposition Result	Opposition Result	Opposition Result	Opposition Result	Opposition Result	Opposition Result	Opposition Result	Rank
Brigitte Lastrade	48 kg	Briggs (GBR); L	Did not advance			Erdenet-Od (MGL); W	Soler (ESP); L	Did not advance		
Lyne Poirier	52 kg	Bye	Saldanha (POR); L	Did not advance						
Pascale Mainville	56 kg	Arnaud (FRA); L	Did not advance							
Michelle Buckingham	61 kg	Beltrán (CUB); L	Did not advance							
Sandra Greaves	66 kg	Bye	Fujimoto (JPN); W	Schreiber (GER); L	Did not advance	—N/a	Martinel (ARG); L	Did not advance		
Alison Webb	72 kg	Bye	Kim (KOR); L	Did not advance		Utama (INA); W	Juszczak (POL); L	Did not advance		
Jane Patterson	+72 kg	Bye	Lupino (FRA); L	Did not advance		Santini (PUR); L	Did not advance			

== Modern pentathlon ==
Two male pentathletes represented Canada in 1992.

Athlete	Event	Fencing (épée one touch)			Swimming (300 m freestyle)			Shooting (Air pistol)			Riding (show jumping)			Running (4000 m)			Total points	Final rank
Athlete	Event	Results	Rank	MP points	Time	Rank	MP points	Points	Rank	MP Points	Penalties	Rank	MP points	Time	Rank	MP Points	Total points	Final rank
Laurie Shong	Individual	35–30	24	813	3:20.9	17	1268	177	53	925	440	59	660	14:44.2	61	913	4579	59
Ian Soellner	Individual	32–33	40	762	3:29.2	43	1200	177	53	925	30	8	1070	14:19.4	54	988	4945	43

== Rowing ==
Men

Athlete	Event	Heats		Repechage		Semifinals		Final	
Athlete	Event	Time	Rank	Time	Rank	Time	Rank	Time	Rank
Don Dickison; Todd Hallett	Double sculls	6:28.84	2 R	6:36.52	1 SF A/B	6:20.99	4 FB	6:22.84	7
Henry Hering; Donald Backer	Coxless pair	6:42.84	3 R	6:47.46	2 SF A/B	6:37.29	4 FB	6:37.32	9
Don Telfer; Brian Saunderson; Cedric Burgers; Greg Stevenson	Coxless four	6:03.91	4 R	6:12.71	2 SF A/B	6:09.20	6 FB	6:13.01	11
John Wallace; Bruce Robertson; Michael Forgeron; Darren Barber; Robert Marland; Michael Rascher; Andy Crosby; Derek Porter; Terry Paul	Eight	5:32.59	1 SF A/B	Bye		5:35.11	2 FA	5:29.53	1st place, gold medalist(s)

Women

Athlete	Event	Heats		Repechage		Semifinals		Final	
Athlete	Event	Time	Rank	Time	Rank	Time	Rank	Time	Rank
Silken Laumann	Single sculls	7:46.16	2 SF A/B	Bye		7:30.48	1 FA	7:28.85	3rd place, bronze medalist(s)
Marnie McBean; Kathleen Heddle	Coxless pair	7:41.19	1 SF A/B	Bye		7:18.00	1 FA	7:06.22	1st place, gold medalist(s)
Kirsten Barnes; Brenda Taylor; Jessica Monroe; Kay Worthington	Coxless four	6:44.11	1 FA	Bye		—N/a		6:30.85	1st place, gold medalist(s)
Kirsten Barnes; Brenda Taylor; Megan Delehanty; Shannon Crawford; Marnie McBean; Kay Worthington; Jessica Monroe; Kathleen Heddle; Lesley Thompson-Willie	Eight	6:11.44	1 FA	Bye		—N/a		6:02.62	1st place, gold medalist(s)

== Sailing ==
Men

Athlete	Event	Race							Net points	Final rank
Athlete	Event	1	2	3	4	5	6	7	Net points	Final rank
Hank Lammens	Finn	8	~~36~~	36	3	27	25	3	102	13
Jeff Eckard; Nigel Cochrane	470	18	14	17	14	~~39~~	23	34	120	14

Women

Athlete	Event	Race										Net points	Final rank
Athlete	Event	1	2	3	4	5	6	7	8	9	10	Net points	Final rank
Caroll-Ann Alie	Lechner A-390	5.7	22	20	21	27	17	16	19	14	~~31~~	161.7	14
Shona Moss	Europe	~~28~~	22	14	13	19	19	23	—N/a			110	15
Penny Stamper; Sarah McLean	470	13	19	11.7	~~20~~	14	20	17	—N/a			94.7	11

Open
Fleet racing

Athlete	Event	Race							Net points	Final rank
Athlete	Event	1	2	3	4	5	6	7	Net points	Final rank
Frank McLaughlin; John Millen	Flying Dutchman	18	19	13	19	8	~~21~~	5.7	82.7	9
Dave Sweeney; Kevin Smith	Tornado	8	15	3	15	5.7	16	~~29~~	62.7	5
Eric Jespersen; Ross MacDonald	Star	5.7	18	~~33~~	3	25	8	3	62.7	3rd place, bronze medalist(s)

Match racing

Athlete	Event	Qualification races						Total	Rank
Athlete	Event	1	2	3	4	5	6	Total	Rank
Paul Thomson; Philip Gow; Stuart Flinn	Soling	11.7	11.7	13	8	11.7	~~18~~	56.1	7

== Shooting ==
Men

Athlete	Event	Qualification		Final	
Athlete	Event	Points	Rank	Points	Rank
Michael Ashcroft	50 metre rifle prone	595	15	Did not advance	
Rodney Colwell	10 metre air pistol	577	14	Did not advance	
Rodney Colwell	50 metre pistol	543	37	Did not advance	
Michel Dion	50 metre rifle three positions	1146	33	Did not advance	
Michel Dion	50 metre rifle prone	593	24	Did not advance	
Guy Lorion	10 metre air rifle	580	35	Did not advance	
Jean-François Sénécal	10 metre air rifle	578	38	Did not advance	
Wayne Sorensen	50 metre rifle three positions	1152	26	Did not advance	

Women

Athlete	Event	Qualification		Final	
Athlete	Event	Points	Rank	Points	Rank
Christina Ashcroft	10 metre air rifle	385	31	Did not advance	
Christina Ashcroft	50 metre rifle three positions	577	14	Did not advance	
Sharon Bowes	10 metre air rifle	387	26	Did not advance	
Sharon Bowes	50 metre rifle three positions	580	7 Q	673.6	7
Sharon Cozzarin	10 metre air pistol	374	31	Did not advance	

Open

Athlete	Event	Qualification		Final	
Athlete	Event	Points	Rank	Points	Rank
George Leary	Trap	191	16	Did not advance	
Susan Nattrass	Trap	188	21	Did not advance	
John Primrose	Trap	139	33	Did not advance	

== Swimming ==
Men

Athlete	Event	Heats		Final A/B	
Athlete	Event	Time	Rank	Time	Rank
Gary Anderson	200 metre individual medley	2:02.63	7 FA	2:04.30	8
Robert Baird	400 metre individual medley	4:24.31	14 FB	4:25.06	16
Christopher Bowie	1500 metre freestyle	15:34.28	15	Did not advance	
Raymond Brown	100 metre backstroke	56.98	18	Did not advance	
Raymond Brown	200 metre backstroke	2:01.81	15 FB	2:03.01	15
Stephen Clarke	50 metre freestyle	23.95	40	Did not advance	
Stephen Clarke	100 metre freestyle	50.73	18	Did not advance	
Jon Cleveland	100 metre breaststroke	1:02.73	12 FB	1:02.73	13
Jon Cleveland	200 metre breaststroke	2:15.68	14 FB	2:16.20	14
Kevin Draxinger	200 metre backstroke	2:01.73	14 FB	2:01.79	12
Marcel Gery	100 metre butterfly	53.94	4 FA	54.18	6
Michael Mason	200 metre breaststroke	2:18.64	23	Did not advance	
David McLellan	1500 metre freestyle	15:58.38	23	Did not advance	
Curtis Myden	100 metre breaststroke	1:03.80	25	Did not advance	
Curtis Myden	400 metre individual medley	4:22.41	12 FB	4:21.91	10
Turlough O'Hare	200 metre freestyle	1:50.42	17 FB	1:51.07	15
Turlough O'Hare	400 metre freestyle	3:56.70	21	Did not advance	
Edward Parenti	400 metre freestyle	3:58.96	27	Did not advance	
Edward Parenti	200 metre butterfly	2:02.00	26	Did not advance	
Tom Ponting	100 metre butterfly	54.77	15 FB	55.00	16
Tom Ponting	200 metre butterfly	2:01.20	15 FB	2:01.60	13
Mark Tewksbury	100 metre backstroke	54.75	2 FA	53.98	1st place, gold medalist(s)
Darren Ward	100 metre freestyle	52.05	41	Did not advance	
Darren Ward	200 metre freestyle	1:51.62	23	Did not advance	
Darren Ward	200 metre individual medley	2:03.71	12 FB	2:05.09	14
Edward Parenti; Darren Ward; Christopher Bowie; Turlough O'Hare	4 × 200 metre freestyle relay	7:25.61	9	Did not advance	
Mark Tewksbury; Jon Cleveland; Marcel Gery; Stephen Clarke; Tom Ponting (heats)	4 × 100 metre medley relay	3:42.47	3 FA	3:39.66	3rd place, bronze medalist(s)

Women

Athlete	Event	Heats		Final A/B	
Athlete	Event	Time	Rank	Time	Rank
Guylaine Cloutier	100 metre breaststroke	1:09.89	5 FA	1:09.71	4
Guylaine Cloutier	200 metre breaststroke	2:29.01	4 FA	2:29.88	5
Nikki Dryden	200 metre freestyle	2:03.59	19	Did not advance	
Nikki Dryden	100 metre backstroke	1:03.71	15 FB	1:03.53	14
Nikki Dryden	200 metre backstroke	2:17.54	23	Did not advance	
Lisa Flood	100 metre breaststroke	1:10.95	12 FB	1:11.17	14
Nathalie Giguère	200 metre breaststroke	2:29.71	5 FA	2:30.11	6
Beth Hazel	200 metre backstroke	2:17.70	25	Did not advance	
Allison Higson	100 metre freestyle	58.47	25	Did not advance	
Allison Higson	200 metre freestyle	2:04.25	22	Did not advance	
Julie Howard	100 metre backstroke	1:05.26	28	Did not advance	
Julie Howard	100 metre butterfly	1:02.89	27	Did not advance	
Marianne Limpert	200 metre individual medley	2:16.84	5 FA	2:17.09	6
Joanne Malar	400 metre individual medley	4:52.85	16 FB	4:48.52	11
Andrea Nugent	50 metre freestyle	26.29	12 FB	26.24	11
Andrea Nugent	100 metre freestyle	56.82	16 FB	56.91	16
Jacinthe Pineau	200 metre butterfly	2:19.44	23	Did not advance	
Nancy Sweetnam	200 metre individual medley	2:17.26	8 FA	2:17.13	7
Nancy Sweetnam	400 metre individual medley	4:52.41	15 FB	4:50.17	13
Kristin Topham	50 metre freestyle	26.32	13 FB	26.17	10
Kristin Topham	100 metre butterfly	1:01.20	11 FB	1:01.91	14
Marianne Limpert; Nikki Dryden; Andrea Nugent; Allison Higson	4 × 100 metre freestyle relay	3:49.28	8 FA	3:49.37	8
Nikki Dryden; Guylaine Cloutier; Kristin Topham; Andrea Nugent	4 × 100 metre medley relay	4:11.67	6 FA	4:09.26	6

== Synchronized swimming ==
Three synchronized swimmers represented Canada in 1992.

Athlete	Event	Figures		Qualification			Final		
Athlete	Event	Points	Rank	Points	Total (Figures + Qualification)	Rank	Points	Total (Figures + Final)	Rank
Sylvie Fréchette	Solo	92.557	4 Q	98.520	191.077	2 Q	99.160	191.717	1st place, gold medalist(s)
Penny Vilagos	Solo	89.534	6	Did not advance					
Vicky Vilagos	Solo	91.175	5	Did not advance					
Penny Vilagos; Vicky Vilagos	Duet	90.354	2	98.240	188.594	2 Q	99.040	189.394	2nd place, silver medalist(s)

== Table tennis ==
Men

Athlete	Event	Group Stage				Round of 16	Quarterfinal	Semifinal	Final	
Athlete	Event	Opposition Result	Opposition Result	Opposition Result	Rank	Opposition Result	Opposition Result	Opposition Result	Opposition Result	Rank
Joe Ng	Singles	Roßkopf (GER); L 0–2	Mazunov (EUN); L 0–2	Hyatt (JAM); L 0–2	4	Did not advance				

Women

Athlete	Event	Group Stage				Round of 16	Quarterfinal	Semifinal	Final	
Athlete	Event	Opposition Result	Opposition Result	Opposition Result	Rank	Opposition Result	Opposition Result	Opposition Result	Opposition Result	Rank
Barbara Chiu	Singles	Bhushan (USA); L 0–2	Deng (CHN); L 0–2	Al-Hindi (JOR); W 2–0	3	Did not advance				

== Tennis ==
Men

Athlete	Event	Round of 64	Round of 32	Round of 16	Quarterfinals	Semifinals	Final	
Athlete	Event	Opposition Result	Opposition Result	Opposition Result	Opposition Result	Opposition Result	Opposition Result	Rank
Andrew Sznajder	Singles	Wijaya (INA); W (6–2, 6–4, 7–5)	Hlasek (SUI); L (6–4, 4–6, 3–6, 6^{1}–7)	Did not advance				
Brian Gyetko; Sébastien Leblanc	Doubles	—N/a	Carlsen / Fetterlein (DEN); W (6–3, 7–6^{4}, 7–6^{2})	Ferreira / Norval (RSA); L (3–6, 6^{4}–7, 4–6)	Did not advance			

Women

Athlete	Event	Round of 64	Round of 32	Round of 16	Quarterfinals	Semifinals	Final	
Athlete	Event	Opposition Result	Opposition Result	Opposition Result	Opposition Result	Opposition Result	Opposition Result	Rank
Patricia Hy	Singles	Randriantefy (MAD); W (6–2, 6–1)	Fernandez (USA); L (2–6, 6–1, 10–12)	Did not advance				
Rene Simpson-Alter	Singles	Date (JPN); L (5–7, 1–6)	Did not advance					
Patricia Hy; Rene Simpson-Alter	Doubles	—N/a	Duangchan / Sangaram (THA); W (6–4, 6–4)	Demengeot / Tauziat (FRA); L (6–3, 3–6, 2–6)	Did not advance			

== Volleyball ==
=== Men's team competition ===
- Preliminary round (group A)
  - Lost to Spain 15-13 7-15 15-9 12-15 13–15
  - Lost to United States 12-15 12-15 15-10 15-12 14–16
  - Defeated France 15-11 15-6 15–8
  - Lost to Italy 11-15 15-8 12-15 7–15
  - Lost to Japan 15-11 17-15 11-15 13-15 10–15
- Quarterfinals
  - did not advance
- Classification match
  - 9th/10th place: lost to South Korea (1–3) → 10th place
- Team roster
  - Marc Albert
  - Kevin Boyles
  - Gino Brousseau
  - Allan Coulter
  - Christopher Frehlick
  - Terrance Gagnon
  - Randal Gingera
  - Kent Greves
  - William Knight
  - Russell Paddock
  - Greg Williscroft
  - Bradley Willock

== See also ==
- Canada at the 1990 Commonwealth Games
- Canada at the 1991 Pan American Games
- Canada at the 1994 Commonwealth Games
