= 1990 Women's Hockey World Cup =

1990 Hockey World Cup
Tournament details
- Host country: Australia
- City: Sydney
- Teams: 12
- Venue: Homebush Stadium

Final positions
- Champions: Netherlands (5th title)
- Runner-up: Australia
- Third place: South Korea

Tournament statistics
- Matches played: 42
- Goals scored: 113 (2.69 per match)
- Top scorer: (Netherlands) Lisanne Lejeune (8 goals)
- Best player: (Netherlands) Lisanne Lejeune

The 1990 Women's Hockey World Cup was the seventh edition of the Women's Hockey World Cup field hockey tournament. It was held from 2 to 13 May in Sydney, Australia. It was won by the Netherlands, who defeated host nation Australia 3–1 in the final. It was the Netherlands fifth Women's Hockey World Cup title and their third consecutive title. South Korea beat England 3–2 to finish third.

== Results ==
=== Preliminary round ===
==== Pool A ====
Pos	Team	Pld	W	D	L	GF	GA	GD	Pts	Qualification
1	Australia	5	3	2	0	8	2	+6	8	Semi-finals
2	England	5	3	2	0	4	0	+4	8	Semi-finals
3	West Germany	5	3	1	1	9	4	+5	7	
4	China	5	1	1	3	4	9	−5	3	
5	Argentina	5	0	2	3	2	7	−5	2	
6	Japan	5	0	2	3	1	6	−5	2	

Source: FIH
Rules for classification: 1) points; 2) goal difference; 3) goals scored; 4) head-to-head result.

2 May 1990

Australia	3–0	China
Pereira 20', 36', 50'	Report

3 May 1990

England	1–0	Argentina
Edwards 66'	Report

3 May 1990

West Germany	2–0	Japan
Becker; Jungjohann	Report

4 May 1990

Japan	0–1	England
	Report	Brown 37'

4 May 1990

Australia	1–1	Argentina
Buchanan 42'	Report	Hussey 17'

4 May 1990

West Germany	3–1	China
Becker; Ferneck	Report	Ao

6 May 1990

West Germany	1–2	Australia
Jungjohann 36'	Report	Small 23'; Hawkes 29'

6 May 1990

China	0–2	England
	Report	Brown 7'; Atkins 34'

6 May 1990

Argentina	0–0	Japan
	Report

7 May 1990

England	0–0	West Germany
	Report

8 May 1990

China	2–0	Argentina
Yang Hu. Chen J.	Report

8 May 1990

Australia	2–0	Japan
Pereira 40', 55'	Report

9 May 1990

Argentina	1–3	West Germany
Pazos 21'	Report	Dickenscheid 6'; Ferneck 12', 55'

9 May 1990

Japan	1–1	China
Kato 47'	Report	Yang Hu. 27'

9 May 1990

England	0–0	Australia
	Report

==== Pool B ====
Pos	Team	Pld	W	D	L	GF	GA	GD	Pts	Qualification
1	Netherlands	5	4	1	0	11	0	+11	9	Semi-finals
2	South Korea	5	3	1	1	17	1	+16	7	Semi-finals
3	New Zealand	5	2	1	2	8	6	+2	5	
4	Spain	5	2	1	2	7	12	−5	5	
5	Canada	5	1	1	3	2	7	−5	3	
6	United States	5	0	1	4	3	22	−19	1	

Source: FIH
Rules for classification: 1) points; 2) goal difference; 3) goals scored; 4) head-to-head result.

2 May 1990

New Zealand	0–1	Canada
	Report	Covey 28'

2 May 1990

Spain	0–7	South Korea
	Report	Jin 14'; Lim 20', 46'; Kwon 26'; Kim Y. 31'; Yang 44', 49'

2 May 1990

Netherlands	3–0	United States
Lejeune 30', 50'; Wouters 65'	Report

3 May 1990

South Korea	0–1	New Zealand
	Report	Arthur 48'

3 May 1990

Canada	1–1	United States
Low	Report	Richards

4 May 1990

Netherlands	3–0	Spain
Benninga; Lejeune; Thate	Report

5 May 1990

United States	1–3	Spain
Fuchs	Report	Dorado; Barrio

5 May 1990

New Zealand	0–3	Netherlands
	Report	Lejeune 11'; Van der Ben 19', 68'

5 May 1990

South Korea	1–0	Canada
Jang	Report

7 May 1990

South Korea	0–0	Netherlands
	Report

7 May 1990

New Zealand	6–1	United States
Bell-Kake 10', 63'; Trolove 23', 50'; Duggan 25'; Lawrence 69'	Report	Marois 28'

7 May 1990

Canada	0–3	Spain
	Report	Coghen 48'; Motos 60'; Dorado 65'

8 May 1990

United States	0–9	South Korea
	Report	Jin 2', 23'; Cho 8', 33', 47'; Lim 28', 61'; Jang 35', 65'

8 May 1990

Spain	1–1	New Zealand
Rodríguez	Report	Bell-Kake

9 May 1990

Netherlands	2–0	Canada
Lejeune 15', 44'	Report

=== Classification round ===
==== Ninth to twelfth place classification ====
Crossover
10 May 1990
Argentina	4
United States	0
10 May 1990
Canada	1
Japan	0

Ninth place
12 May 1990
Argentina (p.s.o)	1 (4)
Canada	1 (2)
Eleventh place
12 May 1990
United States	1
Japan	3

===== Crossover =====
10 May 1990
12:30

Argentina	4–0	United States
Pazos; Hussey; Sánchez	Report

10 May 1990
15:00

Canada	1–0	Japan
Gaiga	Report

===== Eleventh and twelfth place =====
12 May 1990
10:00

United States	1–3	Japan
Neiss 63'	Report	Takahashi 21', 24'; Hayashi 44'

===== Ninth and tenth place =====
12 May 1990
12:30

Argentina	1–1 (a.e.t.)	Canada
Pazos 84'	Report	Low 78'
Penalties
	4–2

==== Fifth to eighth place classification ====
Crossover
11 May 1990
West Germany	1
Spain	2
11 May 1990
New Zealand	1 (4)
China (p.s.o)	1 (5)

Fifth place
12 May 1990
Spain	1
China	0
Seventh place
12 May 1990
West Germany	1
New Zealand	4

===== Crossover =====
11 May 1990
10:00

West Germany	1–2	Spain
Jungjohann	Report	Dorado; Motos

11 May 1990
12:30

New Zealand	0–0 (a.e.t.)	China
	Report
Penalties
	4–5

===== Seventh and eighth place =====
12 May 1990
15:00

West Germany	1–4	New Zealand
	Report

===== Fifth and sixth place =====
12 May 1990
17:30

Spain	1–0	China
Dorado	Report

==== First to fourth place classification ====
Semi-finals
11 May 1990
Australia (a.e.t.)	2
South Korea	1
11 May 1990
Netherlands	5
England	0

Final
13 May 1990
Australia	1
Netherlands	3
Third place
13 May 1990
South Korea	3
England	2

===== Semi-finals =====
11 May 1990
15:00

Australia	2–1 (a.e.t.)	South Korea
Buchanan 25'; Pereira 80'	Report	Jin 49'

11 May 1990
17:30

Netherlands	5–0	England
De Ruiter 3'; Wouters 11', 16'; Lejeune 45'; Thate 66'	Report

===== Third and fourth place =====
13 May 1990
15:00

South Korea	3–2	England
Yang 17'; Kim S. 49'; Jang 63'	Report	Sixsmith 1'; Atkins 3'

===== Final =====
13 May 1990
17:30

Australia	1–3	Netherlands
Hawkes 39'	Report	Lejeune 8' de Ruiter 37'; Van der Ben 50'

== Winning Squad ==
Netherlands

- Ingrid Appels
- Carina Benninga
- Carina Bleeker
- Wietske de Ruiter
- Annemaike Fokke
- Noor Holsboer
- Danielle Koenen
- Lisanne Lejeune
- Florentine Steenberghe
- Carol Thate
- Jacqueline Toxopeus
- Caroline van Nieuwenhuyze-Leenders
- Helen van der Ben
- Isabelle van Zenderen
- Ingrid Wolff
- Mieketine Wouters

== Final standings ==
Pos	Grp	Team	Pld	W	D	L	GF	GA	GD	Pts	Final result
1	B	Netherlands	7	6	1	0	19	1	+18	13	Gold medal
2	A	Australia	7	4	2	1	11	6	+5	10	Silver medal
3	B	South Korea	7	4	1	2	21	5	+16	9	Bronze medal
4	A	England	7	3	2	2	6	8	−2	8	Fourth place
5	B	Spain	7	4	1	2	10	13	−3	9	Eliminated in group stage
6	A	China	7	1	2	4	4	10	−6	4	Eliminated in group stage
7	B	New Zealand	7	3	2	2	12	7	+5	8	Eliminated in group stage
8	A	West Germany	7	3	1	3	11	10	+1	7	Eliminated in group stage
9	A	Argentina	7	1	3	3	7	8	−1	5	Eliminated in group stage
10	B	Canada	7	2	2	3	4	8	−4	6	Eliminated in group stage
11	A	Japan	7	1	2	4	4	8	−4	4	Eliminated in group stage
12	B	United States	7	0	1	6	4	29	−25	1	Eliminated in group stage

Source: FIH

== Goalscorers ==
- Note: Scorers from the seventh and eighth place playoff between West Germany and New Zealand are unknown, and hence have not been added to this list.

There were 113 goals scored in 42 matches, for an average of 2.69 goals per match.

8 goals

- (Netherlands) Lisanne Lejeune

6 goals

- (Australia) Jacqueline Pereira

5 goals

- (Spain) Natalia Dorado

4 goals

- (Argentina) María Gabriela Pazos
- (South Korea) Jang Eun-jung
- (South Korea) Lim Gye-suk
- (South Korea) Jin Won-sim

3 goals

- (Netherlands) Helen van der Ben
- (Netherlands) Mieketine Wouters
- (New Zealand) Tina Bell-Kake
- (South Korea) Yang Hye-suk
- (South Korea) Cho Kyu-soon
- (West Germany) Britta Becker
- (West Germany) Christine Ferneck
- (West Germany) Caren Jungjohann

2 goals

- (Argentina) Marcela Hussey
- (Australia) Sharon Buchanan
- (Australia) Rechelle Hawkes
- (Canada) Rochelle Low
- (China) Yang Huiping
- (England) Jill Atkins
- (England) Karen Brown
- (Japan) Hisayo Takahashi
- (Netherlands) Wietske de Ruiter
- (Netherlands) Carole Thate
- (New Zealand) Kate Trolove
- (Spain) Teresa Motos

1 goal

- (Argentina) Gabriela Sánchez
- (Australia) Kim Small
- (Canada) Deborah Covey
- (Canada) Milena Gaiga
- (China) Ao Hongmei
- (China) Chen Jianbin
- (England) Kathryn Edwards
- (England) Jane Sixsmith
- (Japan) Mina Hayashi
- (Japan) Akemi Kato
- (Netherlands) Carina Benninga
- (New Zealand) Christine Arthur
- (New Zealand) Susan Duggan
- (New Zealand) Anna Lawrence
- (South Korea) Kwon Chang-sook
- (South Korea) Soon-duk
- (South Korea) Kim Young-sook
- (Spain) Sonia Barrio
- (Spain) Mercedes Coghen
- (Spain) María Ángeles Rodríguez
- (United States) Tracey Fuchs
- (United States) Barbara Marois
- (United States) Pam Neiss
- (United States) Erica Richards
- (West Germany) Tanja Dickenscheid
