= Söllner =

Söllner is a German surname most prevalent in northern Bavaria. It originates as a term for a social class in feudal times; a Söllner was a free farmer who did own a farmstead but no land (either leasing land or working for a landowner).

Notable people called Söllner include:

- Hans Söllner (born 1955), Bavarian singer-songwriter
- Herbert Söllner (1935–1990), German speed skater
- Karl Söllner (1903-1986), German-Austrian chemist
- Paul Söllner (1911–1991), German rower
- Siegfried Söllner (1936–2019), German football player
- Werner Söllner (1951–2019), German writer

== See also ==
- Ian Soellner (born 1969), Canadian pentathlete
