= Rachel Hunter (disambiguation) =

Rachel Hunter is the name of

- Rachel Hunter (born 1969), New Zealand model, actress and reality TV show host
- Rachel Hunter (author) (ca. 1754–1813), English novelist
- Rachel Hunter (equestrian) (born 1969), Canadian Olympic equestrian
