= Cycling at the 1992 Summer Olympics – Women's sprint =

Women's cycling sprint at the Games of the XXV Olympiad
- Venue: Velòdrom d'Horta
- Date: 28–31 July 1992
- Competitors: 12 from 12 nations

Medalists
1st place, gold medalist(s)		Erika Salumäe	Estonia
2nd place, silver medalist(s)		Annett Neumann	Germany
3rd place, bronze medalist(s)		Ingrid Haringa	Netherlands

The women's 200m Sprint at the 1992 Summer Olympics (Cycling) was an event that consisted of cyclists making three laps around the track. Only the time for the last 200 metres of the 750 metres covered was counted as official time. The races were held on Tuesday, July 28, Wednesday through Friday, July 31, 1992 at the Velòdrom d'Horta.

Erika Salumäe defended her gold medal from 1988, but this time she represented her native Estonia instead of the Soviet Union that collapsed a year ago.

== Medalists ==
Gold:	Silver:	Bronze:
Erika Salumäe (EST)	Annett Neumann (GER)	Ingrid Haringa (NED)

== Results ==
- Q denotes qualification by place in heat.
- q denotes qualification by overall place.
- REL denotes relegated- due to being passed
- WLK denotes a walkover-unopposed victory.
- DNS denotes did not start.
- DNF denotes did not finish.
- DQ denotes disqualification.
- NR denotes national record.
- OR denotes Olympic record.
- WR denotes world record.
- PB denotes personal best.
- SB denotes season best.

=== Qualifying round ===
Held Tuesday, July 28.
Times and average speeds are listed. Times are used for seeding.

Pos.	Athlete	NOC	Time	Ave. Speed	Notes
1	Ingrid Haringa	Netherlands	11.419 s	63.052 km/h	OR
2	Félicia Ballanger	France	11.508 s	62.565 km/h	
3	Annett Neumann	Germany	11.689 s	61.596 km/h	
4	Galina Yenyukhina	Unified Team	11.699 s	61.543 km/h	
5	Tanya Dubnicoff	Canada	11.773 s	61.516 km/h	
6	Erika Salumäe	Estonia	11.857 s	60.723 km/h	
7	Connie Paraskevin-Young	United States	11.946 s	60.271 km/h	
8	Rita Razmaitė	Lithuania	12.058 s	59.711 km/h	
9	Wang Yan	China	12.154 s	59.239 km/h	
10	Mika Kuroki	Japan	12.513 s	57.540 km/h	
11	Daniela Larreal	Venezuela	12.608 s	57.106 km/h	
12	Olga Sacasa	Nicaragua	14.061 s	51.205 km/h	

== 1st round ==
Held Tuesday, July 28
The first round consisted of four heats, of three riders. Winners advanced to the next round, losers competed in the repechage.

Heat	Pos	Athlete	NOS	Time	Ave. Speed	Qualify
1	1	Ingrid Haringa	Netherlands	12.179 s	63.497 km/h	Q
1	2	Wang Yan	China			
1	3	Rita Razmaitė	Lithuania			
2	1	Félicia Ballanger	France	12.615 s	63.609 km/h	Q
2	2	Mika Kuroki	Japan			
2	3	Connie Paraskevin-Young	United States	DQ		
3	1	Erika Salumäe	Estonia	12.377 s	64.011 km/h	Q
3	2	Annett Neumann	Germany			
3	3	Daniela Larreal	Venezuela			
4	1	Tanya Dubnicoff	Canada	12.416 s	63.503 km/h	Q
4	2	Galina Yenyukhina	Unified Team			
4	–	Olga Sacasa	Nicaragua	DNS		

=== Repechage ===
Held Tuesday, July 28
The seven defeated cyclists from the first round took part in the repechage. They raced in four heats, one being unopposed. The winner of each heat advance to quarter-final.

Heat	Pos	Athlete	NOS	Time	Ave. Speed	Qualify
1	1	Wang Yan	China	WLK		Q
2	1	Mika Kuroki	Japan	12.453 s	57.817 km/h	Q
2	2	Daniela Larreal	Venezuela			
3	1	Annett Neumann	Germany	12.238 s	58.833 km/h	Q
3	2	Connie Paraskevin-Young	United States			
4	1	Galina Yenyukhina	Unified Team	13.069 s	55.092 km/h	Q
4	2	Rita Razmaitė	Lithuania			

== Quarter-finals ==
Held Wednesday, July 29.
The eight riders that had advanced to the quarterfinals competed pairwise in four matches. Each match consisted of two races, with a potential third race being used as a tie-breaker if each cyclist won one of the first two races. Winners advanced to the semifinals, losers competed in a 5th to 8th place classification.

Heat	Pos	Athlete	NOS	Time 1	Time 2	Decider	Qualify
1	1	Ingrid Haringa	Netherlands	12.662 s	12.792 s		Q
1	2	Mika Kuroki	Japan				
2	1	Félicia Ballanger	France	12.536 s	14.786 s		Q
2	2	Wang Yan	China				
3	1	Erika Salumäe	Estonia	12.192 s		12.090 s	Q
3	2	Galina Yenyukhina	Unified Team		12.265 s		
4	1	Annett Neumann	Germany	12.283 s	12.265 s		Q
4	2	Tanya Dubnicoff	Canada				

=== Classification 5–8 ===
Held Friday, July 31
The 5–8 classification was a single race with all four riders that had lost in the quarterfinals taking place. The winner of the race received 5th place, with the others taking the three following places in order.

Pos	Athlete	NOS	Time	Ave. Speed
1	Galina Yenyukhina	Unified Team	12.575 s	57.256 km/h
2	Tanya Dubnicoff	Canada		
3	Mika Kuroki	Japan		
–	Wang Yan	China	DNS	

== Semifinals ==
Held Thursday, July 30.
The four riders that had advanced to the semifinals competed pairwise in two matches. Each match consisted of two races, with a potential third race being used as a tie-breaker if each cyclist won one of the first two races. Winners advanced to the finals, losers competed in the bronze medal match.

Heat	Pos	Athlete	NOS	Time 1	Time 2	Decider	Qualify
1	1	Annett Neumann	Germany		11.889 s	12.285 s	Q
1	2	Ingrid Haringa	Netherlands	12.263 s			
2	1	Erika Salumäe	Estonia	11.937 s	12.423 s		Q
2	2	Félicia Ballanger	France				

=== Medal Finals ===
Held Friday, July 31.

==== Bronze medal match ====
The bronze medal match was contested in a set of three races, with the winner of two races declared the winner.

Pos	Athlete	NOS	Time 1	Time 2	Decider
1	Ingrid Haringa	Netherlands	12.402 s	12.400 s	
2	Félicia Ballanger	France			

==== Gold medal match ====
The gold medal match was contested in a set of three races, with the winner of two races declared the winner.

Pos	Athlete	NOS	Time 1	Time 2	Decider
1	Erika Salumäe	Estonia		12.667 s	12.244 s
2	Annett Neumann	Germany	12.776 s		

== Final classification ==
	Final results	
Pos.	Athlete	NOC
1.	Erika Salumäe	Estonia
2.	Annett Neumann	Germany
3.	Ingrid Haringa	Netherlands
4.	Félicia Ballanger	France
5.	Galina Yenyukhina	Unified Team
6.	Tanya Dubnicoff	Canada
7.	Mika Kuroki	Japan
–	Wang Yan	China
