= Olga Pikhienko =

Russian circus performer (born 1980)

- Born: February 11, 1980 (age 46); Volgograd, Russian SFSR, Soviet Union

Olga Pikhienko (born February 11, 1980) is a circus performer who specializes in handbalancing and contortion. Pikhienko started in rhythmic gymnastics at the age of five. When she was eleven, she started performing with her father, Sasha Pikhienko, at the Nikulin Circus based in Moscow. Olga's act with her father won them a gold medal in 1992 at the Festival Mondial du Cirque de Demain in Paris. In 1993, they won a silver medal in Beijing, China at the World Festival.

Pikhienko started working with Cirque du Soleil in 1994. In 1996, she went on tour with Cirque du Soleil's production Quidam, and, for more than five years, performed her hand balancing and contortion with canes act throughout Europe and North America. In 2001, she worked on the creation of Varekai, while being filmed for the Bravo network's documentary series Cirque du Soleil: Fire Within, which won an Emmy Award in 2003.

After touring with Varekai for three years, Pikhienko decided to branch out artistically, developing new acts for special events, commercials, print and video. Her new act was choreographed by Debra Brown, who has choreographed for many Cirque du Soleil shows. She returned to Quidam in 2006, and toured with the show once again until she went back to the Cirque du Soleil headquarters for the creation of Iris, her third show with the company. The show premiered in July 2011. According to her personal Facebook page, she left Iris on September 2, 2012. After that, she performed briefly in a show called Le Noir: the Dark Side of Cirque, and also Empire, a show touring in Australia. She has returned to doing private events and resides in Las Vegas, Nevada with her family.

== History ==
- 1985-1990: Rhythmic gymnastics (Russia)
- 1991-1992: Nikulin Circus (Moscow): hand-to-hand contortion with Alexander Pikhienko
- 1993-1994: Ringling Bros. and Barnum & Bailey Circus: hand-to-hand contortion with Alexander Pikhienko
- 1994-2001: Cirque du Soleil's Quidam, North American Tour and European Tour: hand balancing and contortion with canes
- 2001-2003: Cirque du Soleil's Varekai, North American Tour: hand balancing and contortion with canes, principal character
- 2003-2006: Independent artist — special events, television, film, print: hand balancing and contortion with canes
- 2006–2011: Cirque du Soleil's Quidam, North and South American tour
- 2011–2012: Cirque du Soleil's Iris in Hollywood
- 2012: Le Noir: The Dark Side of Cirque
- 2012-2013 Empire, Australian tour
- 2013–present: Independent artist - special events, television, film, print: hand balancing and contortion with canes

== Film and television ==
- Cirque du Soleil — Quidam
- Cirque du Soleil — Varekai
- Cirque du Soleil — Cirque du Soleil: Fire Within
