= Alan Francis =

Alan Francis may refer to:

- Alan Francis (horseshoes), 15-time world horseshoes champion from Ohio
- Alan Francis (writer), comedian and writer from Scotland

== See also ==
- Alun Francis (born 1943), Welsh conductor
- Allen Frances (born 1942), American psychiatrist
- Allan Francis (born 1971), Canadian fencer
