= Olga Sacasa =

Personal information
- Full name: Olga María Sacasa Cruz
- Born: 17 June 1961 (age 65) Nicaragua

Cycling career
- Sport: Cycling
- Disciplines: Road cycling, Track cycling
- Role: Rider

Olga María Sacasa Cruz (born 17 June 1961) is a track and road cyclist from Nicaragua. She represented her nation at the 1992 Summer Olympics on the track in the women's sprint and individual pursuit. Although she was on the startlist for the women's road race, she did not start the race. At 1992 Olympic women's track cycling pursuit qualifying round she established an Olympic Record for Nicaragua. Was graduated with a German/Pre-med major from Mount Holyoke College, 1984. Graduated BS in PT at University of New Mexico, 1999.

== Results ==
Games	Age	City	Rank
1992	31	Barcelona	12 QR
1992	31	Barcelona	16
