= Nadia Al-Hindi =

Jordanian table tennis player

Personal information
- Native name: نادية رشاد الهندية
- Full name: Nadia Rashad Al-Hindi
- National team: Jordan
- Born: February 8, 1972 (age 54)

Sport
- Country: Jordan
- Sport: Table tennis
- Updated on 14 July 2017

Nadia Al-Hindi (Arabic: نادية رشاد الهندية; born February 8, 1972) is a Jordanian Olympic table tennis player. She represented Jordan in 1992 Summer Olympics in Barcelona. She is now a member of the CEO of Jordan Tennis Federation.

== Olympic participation ==
=== Barcelona 1992 ===
Al-Hindi was the youngest and the only female participant for Jordan in that tournament aged 20 years and 173 days then.

Table tennis – Women's Singles – Preliminary Round

Group A
Rank	Athlete	W	L	GW	GL	PW	PL	CHN	USA	CAN	JOR
1	Deng Yaping (CHN)	3	0	6	0	126	67	X	2–0	2–0	2–0
2	Insook Bhushan (USA)	2	1	4	2	110	89	0–2	X	2–0	2–0
3	Barbara Chiu (CAN)	1	2	2	4	104	96	0–2	0–2	X	2–0
4	Nadia Al-Hindi (JOR)	0	3	0	6	38	126	0–2	0–2	0–2	X
