= Carina Benninga =

Dutch field hockey player (born 1962)

Medal record

Women's field hockey

Representing the Netherlands

Olympic Games
Gold medal – first place	1984 Los Angeles	Team
Bronze medal – third place	1988 Seoul	Team

World Cup
Gold medal – first place	1983 Kuala Lumpur	Team
Gold medal – first place	1990 Sydney	Team

Champions Trophy
Bronze medal – third place	1991 Berlin	Team

European Nations Cup
Gold medal – first place	1984 Lille	Team
Gold medal – first place	1987 London	Team

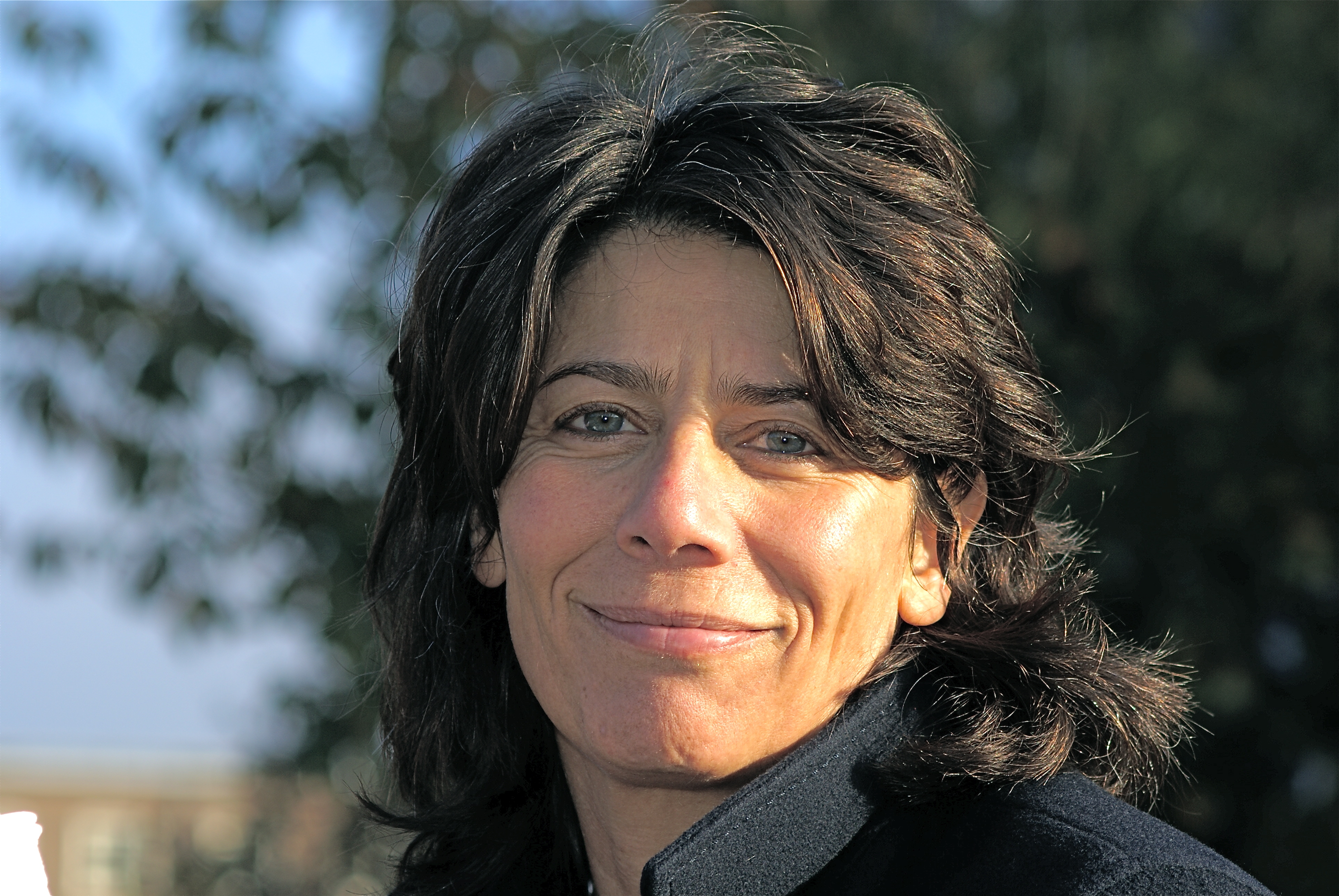
Carina Benninga

Carina Marguerite Benninga (born 18 August 1962 in Leiden) is a former Dutch field hockey player, who played 158 international matches for the Netherlands hockey team, in which she scored 25 goals. She was part of the gold medal winning team at the 1984 Summer Olympics and also won a bronze medal at the 1988 Seoul Olympics. Other highlights of her career include gold medals at the EuroHockey Nations Championship and Champions Trophy in 1987, as well as a gold at the 1983 Women's Hockey World Cup and the 1990 Women's Hockey World Cup. Next to her sports career, Carina Benninga studied law; in 1987 she got her Masters’ degree.

As a captain of the Dutch women's hockey team, Carina Benninga got acquainted with issues of leadership, cooperation, communication, motivation and acceptance. After her active sports career, Carina Benninga completed a series of training courses in the field of psychology and coaching. In 1994 she started her own agency for coaching and consulting.

Carina Benninga coaches and advises on personal, development, and organizational development. In the period 1998 - 2015, she was a director at Van Ede & Partners, a leading career and outplacement agency in the Netherlands. Since 2001, Carina Benninga focuses on The Work of Byron Katie; she is Facilitator and Presenter of The Work in Business.

== Sports ==
At club level, Carina Benninga played for HDM, HGC and Amsterdam in the Dutch Hockey League. The dynamic midfield player made her debut for the national team at the 1983 World Championships in Kuala Lumpur. She was captain of Dutch women's field hockey team from 1989 to 1992. Her older brother Marc also played international field hockey.

Just before the 1986 World Cup in Amstelveen Wagener Stadium, Carina Benninga broke her collarbone. From the stands, she witnessed her teammates winning the world title. Four years later in Sydney, under her leadership, the team of then-coach Roelant Oltmans won the title again, now at the expense of host country Australia.

Carina Benninga participated three times in the Olympics, winning an Olympic gold medal in 1984 at Los Angeles. In 1988, the Dutch women's hockey team captured the Olympic bronze medal at Seoul. At the 1992 Summer Olympics in Barcelona, she was the first woman from the Netherlands to carry the flag at the opening ceremony. The tournament ended in disappointment; this Olympic adventure ended at the sixth position. On 5 August 1992 Carina Benninga played her last match.

== Coaching ==
After her active sports career, Carina Benninga became a professional coach. She was the assistant coach of the United States women's hockey team (1993-1995), head coach at transition grader Alecto (Leiderdorp) and - until the summer of 1999 - the final technical manager at Amsterdam (premier league). Next, she led HC Klein Zwitserland from the transition class to the premier league. As Certified Coach FIH Grade I, Benninga is currently still active as a hockey coach. Besides, she was active for sportsmen union NL Sporter, which she co-founded.

Carina Benninga focuses on the development of talents. Building on her experience as a hockey coach, Benninga specialized in coaching and career development of executives and professionals. Driven by an ongoing interest in psychology, human behavior and interaction, she got certificates and diplomas on Positive Psychology, Gestalt Therapy, Transformational Presence by Alan Seale, Systemic Coaching, Mindfulness, Hoffman Institute, NLP Master, Intuitive Development, Zijnsoriëntatie, Clowning, the Almaaz / Ridhwan School and The Work of Byron Katie.

In 1994, Carina Benninga started her own agency for coaching and consulting. In the period 1998 - 2015 she joined Van Ede & Partners, a Dutch organization for personal development and employability. She worked as a coach, career counselor, trainer and managing director of the Amsterdam branch before she held the position of Chief Executive in the period 2014–2015.

Since summer 2014, Carina Benninga works from Office Benninga. Besides individual coaching, she gives presentations, workshops and training courses focused on leadership.

== Personal ==
Carina Benninga is Jewish. During the Second World War, her paternal grandfather hid with his family in the eastern Netherlands. He was active in the resistance and became one of the founders of Het Parool. Later, he fled to England. On her mother's side, the family was deported from Amsterdam and survived Bergen-Belsen. Carina Benninga now lives in Amsterdam and has two children.

== See also ==
- List of select Jewish field hockey players

Olympic Games
Preceded by Eric Swinkels	Flagbearer for Netherlands; Barcelona 1992	Succeeded by Anky van Grunsven
