= Caroline van Nieuwenhuyze-Leenders =

Dutch field hockey player

Personal information
- Born: Caroline Cecile Marie van Nieuwenhuyze-Leenders; 12 September 1967 (age 58) Rotterdam, Netherlands
Medal record
Women's field hockey
Representing Netherlands
Gold medal – first place	1990 Women's World Cup

Caroline van Nieuwenhuyze-Leenders (born 12 September 1967) is a former Dutch field hockey player.

== Playing career ==
She was a member of the Dutch national team between 1987 and 1992. During this time, she played in 75 official international matches, scoring two goals. With the Dutch national team, van Nieuwenhuyze placed 6th in the 1992 Olympic Games and won gold in the 1990 Women's World Cup. Van Nieuwenhuyze also played for Tempo '34, HC Rotterdam, Amsterdamsche Hockey & Bandy Club and HGC. She has won a total of four national championships: two with Amsterdam and two with HGC.

== Coaching career ==
After her career as a player, van Nieuwenhuyze worked for the Royal Dutch Hockey Association for seven years, where she was national coach of the Dutch girls A and the Juniors. With Jong Oranje she became world champion in Seoul in 1997.

Van Nieuwenhuyze has also coached with several clubs, including HC Rotterdam, Laren, HV Victoria, and HDM. In 2013 she served as head trainer at HC Voorne, where she supports and guides the trainers and coaches of the club through courses and clinics.
