= Cirque du Soleil: Fire Within =

2002 Canadian reality TV miniseries

- Also known as: Fire Within; The Fire Within
- Genre: Television documentary
- Written by: Lewis Cohen; Cleo Paskal
- Directed by: Lewis Cohen; Bachir Bensaddek; Jason Breckenridge
- Narrated by: Christopher Dyson
- Opening theme: "Icare" by René Dupéré
- Composers: Anthony Rozankovic; Daniel Toussaint
- Country of origin: Canada
- Original language: English
- No. of series: 1
- No. of episodes: 13

Production
- Executive producers: Arnie Gelbart; Marie Côté; Vincent Gagné
- Producers: Sylvia Wilson; Martin Bolduc
- Cinematography: Yoan Cart; Peter Krieger; Andrei Khabad
- Editors: Jean-Marie Drot; Maxime Chalifoux; Vidal Beïque
- Camera setup: Single-camera
- Running time: 23 minutes
- Production companies: Cirque du Soleil Images (Créations Musca); Galafilm

Original release
- Network: Bravo (United States); Global Television Network (Canada); Ici ARTV (Québec)
- Release: September 16 – December 9, 2002

Cirque du Soleil: Fire Within is a 2002 Canadian reality television mini-series. The series follows eight Cirque du Soleil performers during the creation and production of the Cirque's touring production, Varekai. Stress ensues as several newcomers try to learn new acrobatic acts for the show, while the subplot also follows the crew behind the show trying to cast new performers, advertise the production, create the stage set, costumes, and make-up, and manage the show under the direction of newcomer Dominic Champagne.

Fire Within was broadcast in Canada on Global in autumn 2002 and began airing in the United States on Bravo in January 2003, in a Monday-night slot.

== Cast ==
Fire Within maintained an ensemble cast of performers chosen to be a part of the original cast of Varekai. The camera crew documented not only these performers' work during production of the show, but also their personal lives which often got in the way of their work. The performers came from a variety of different backgrounds, some experienced Cirque du Soleil performers.

- Oleg Ouchakov – a Cirque du Soleil veteran who joins the cast of Varekai to develop an acrobatic pas de deux with his dance partner, Tatiana.
- Stella Umeh – an Olympic gymnast who joins the cast to perform in the triple trapeze, an act in which she is inexperienced.
- Olga Pikhienko – a young contortionist who leaves Quidam to become a lead in Varekai.
- Raquel Karro Oliveira – a skilled trapeze artist who is part of the triple-trapeze act with Stella.
- Ashley Beaver – an acrobat who arrives to Cirque as a newcomer with his acrobatic partner Gareth to develop an Icarian games act.
- Gareth Hopkins – an acrobat and Cirque du Soleil newcomer who arrives along with his acrobatic partner Ashley to develop an Icarian games act as well as the character of the "Lizard".
- Andrew and Kevin Atherton – identical twin brothers who develop an aerial straps act for the show, as well as participate in much of the show's promotion.

=== Recurring cast ===
Many artists and crew behind the production are featured throughout the mini-series.

- Adrian Berinde — a Romanian singer hired as a primary singer, only to be laid off ten days before the premiere, having had difficulty settling into a role.
- Dominic Champagne — Varekai's director and Cirque du Soleil newcomer.
- Louise Mercier — head of the Cirque du Soleil marketing department.
- Adrian Porter — Gareth and Ashley's acrobatic coach.
- Boris Verkhovsky — Varekai's primary acrobatic coach.
- Michel Laprise — a talent scout for Varekai.

== Broadcast history ==
Fire Within consists of thirteen half-hour episodes with commercials, originally premiering in the United States on Bravo in September 2002. The episodes were aired in the intended order weekly until December 2002 with the conclusion of the mini-series. A 23-minute cast reunion special was released on November 2, 2004 on the DVD release.

Episode; No.	Title	Directed by	Written by	Original air date
1	"New Arrivals"	Lewis Cohen	Lewis Cohen	September 16, 2002
Artists from around the world arrive at the Cirque du Soleil headquarters in Montréal. They are quickly introduced to their new realities. Will everyone be able to adapt to this challenging environment?
2	"Behind Closed Doors"	Lewis Cohen	Lewis Cohen	September 23, 2002
The characters' stories unfold as the focus turns to their personal lives. Gareth is already on his way back home to England. Does he plan on returning to Cirque du Soleil?
3	"The Rise and Fall of the Trapeze"	Lewis Cohen	Lewis Cohen	September 30, 2002
Artists prepare their acts for the first presentation to the creative team. Stella and Raquel's act is the unfortunate focus of the team's attention.
4	"Shooting Stars"	Lewis Cohen	Lewis Cohen	October 7, 2002
It is officially time for the artists to join Cirque du Soleil. Kevin and Andrew question certain clauses in their contracts and hesitate before signing.
5	"The Holiday Season"	Lewis Cohen	Lewis Cohen	October 14, 2002
The holidays bring a more intimate look into the characters as they reflect on their lives and relationships outside Cirque du Soleil. Meanwhile Olga, a world-renowned equilibrist, is offered a starring role in the show.
6	"New Year, New Blood, New Challenges"	Lewis Cohen	Lewis Cohen	October 21, 2002
For the first time, the entire cast is assembled. Adrian, a Romanian singer, as well as several world-renowned artists join the team. Competition intensifies as egos are challenged.
7	"Pushing Acrobatics"	Lewis Cohen	Lewis Cohen	October 28, 2002
Everyone feels the pressure throughout the endless training process. Insecurities are revealed as the characters push themselves to meet individual expectations. Raquel and Stella's act is yet to be approved.
8	"Moving On"	Lewis Cohen	Lewis Cohen	November 4, 2002
Construction of the Grand Chapiteau is underway. Gareth and Ashley are stressed as they are told that they are on the verge of being replaced.
9	"The Grand Chapiteau"	Lewis Cohen	Lewis Cohen	November 11, 2002
The first rehearsal under the blue-and-yellow Grand Chapiteau takes place. The artists must adjust to this new environment. Kevin and Andrew provide a preview of the show at the official press conference.
10	"The Lion's Den"	Lewis Cohen	Lewis Cohen	November 18, 2002
Excitement is in the air as the artists perform in front of a live audience for the very first time. Nonetheless, devastating news awaits several of them. Who will be cut and who will stay?
11	"Countdown to Premiere"	Lewis Cohen	Lewis Cohen	November 25, 2002
As tensions mount even higher, the last dress rehearsal is performed. Last-minute changes are made. Will Olga meet expectations in a lead role?
12	"Opening Night"	Lewis Cohen	Lewis Cohen	December 2, 2002
Journalists, photographers, and special guests attend the world premiere of Varekai. How will the new show be received?
13	"The Aftermath and Departure"	Lewis Cohen	Lewis Cohen	December 9, 2002
A series of dramatic adjustments are imposed. For some, it's the end of a dream, for others they are entering a new world that holds discovery, difficulty, and excitement.

=== Special ===
Title	Directed by	Original air date
"Reunion"	Adrian Wills	November 2, 2004
The cast of Fire Within get together again to reminisce, bring each other up to date on their lives, and have a day of fun.

=== Home media ===
A three-disc DVD set was released in 2004, with the cast reunion special on the third disc.

== Reception ==
Fire Within received positive reviews. Virginia Heffernan of Slate and Tim Goodman of SFGate both gave the series positive reviews.

In San Francisco Chronicle, Tim Goodman wrote that the series benefits from the audience's curiosity about the performers and noted that, unlike Bravo's frequent repeats of Cirque performances, Fire Within was original programming. A 2004 review by Francis Rizzo III of DVD Talk said that despite Cirque du Soleil's cooperation it was not a "fluff piece" and called it one of the most polished documentary series he had seen.

=== Accolades ===
The mini-series won the 55th Primetime Emmy Award for Outstanding Nonfiction Program (Alternative), as well as two Gemini Awards.

Award	Category	Recipients	Result
55th Primetime Emmy Awards	Outstanding Nonfiction Program (Alternative)	Christian Barcellos, Martin Bolduc, Marie Côté, Vincent Gagné, Arnie Gelbart, Amy Introcaso-Davis, and Sylvia Wilson	Won
18th Gemini Awards	Best Direction in a Documentary Series	Lewis Cohen	Won
18th Gemini Awards	Best Reality Based Entertainment Program or Series	Marie Côté, Vincent Gagné, and Arnie Gelbart	Won
