= Marc Benninga =

Dutch field hockey player (born 1961)

Medal record

Men's Field hockey

Representing the Netherlands

Olympic Games
| Bronze medal – third place | 1988 Seoul | Team competition |

World Cup
| Gold medal – first place | 1990 Lahore | Team competition |

Marc Alexander Benninga (born 15 February 1961 in Leiden) is a former Dutch field hockey player, who earned a total number of 53 caps, scoring no goals for the Netherlands national field hockey team in the 1980s and early 1990s.

An older brother of former Dutch field hockey player Carina Benninga, the defender was a member of the bronze medal-winning Dutch team at the 1988 Summer Olympics in Seoul.
