= Stella Umeh =

Canadian artistic gymnast, actress and performer

- Full name: Stella Umeh
- Born: May 27, 1975 (age 51) Toronto, Ontario

Gymnastics career
- Discipline: Women's artistic gymnastics
- Country represented: Canada
- College team: UCLA Bruins (1994-1998)
- Retired: 1998
Medal record
Representing Canada
Artistic Gymnastics
Commonwealth Games
Gold medal – first place	1990 Auckland	Team
Gold medal – first place	1994 Victoria	All-Around
Gold medal – first place	1994 Victoria	Vault
Silver medal – second place	1994 Victoria	Team
Silver medal – second place	1994 Victoria	Uneven Bars
Representing UCLA
NCAA Championships
Gold medal – first place	1995 Athens	Floor
Gold medal – first place	1997 Gainesville	Team
Gold medal – first place	1998 LA	Floor
Silver medal – second place	1995 Athens	Beam
Silver medal – second place	1996 Tuscaloosa	Team
Silver medal – second place	1996 Tuscaloosa	Beam
Bronze medal – third place	1995 Athens	All Around
- Notable work: Varekai

Stella Umeh (born 27 May 1975) is a Canadian former artistic gymnast and current actress and performer. She competed at the 1992 Summer Olympics placing 16th in the all-around. She is of Guyanese and Nigerian descent.

== Gymnastics career ==
Umeh's first big international meet was at the 1989 American Cup in Fairfax, Virginia where she finished fifth. She then competed at the 1990 Commonwealth Games but was originally an alternate. She won a gold medal with the Canadian team. She competed at the American Cup again in 1991, but placed 8th. She went to the 1991 World Artistic Gymnastics Championships in Indianapolis, Indiana, USA. She finished 17th in the all-around. In 1992, Stella started her season at the American Cup in Orlando, Florida, USA and finished 7th. In April, she competed at the 1992 World Artistic Gymnastics Championships in Paris, France. She qualified to Vault and Beam finals, but placed 8th and 5th. Later, she qualified to the 1992 Summer Olympics in Barcelona, Spain. She finished 16th in the all-around, and 10th with the Canadian team. In 1993, she went to Worlds and placed 15th AA and 8th in the FX final. In 1994, she went to the 1994 Commonwealth Games and won 2 golds and 2 silvers, as well as placing 4th and 5th in Floor and Beam finals.

=== College career ===
In 1994, she accepted a college scholarship to UCLA and started attending the school in 1994.

Throughout her four years at college, she won three golds, three silvers and one bronze at the NCAA Championships. She was twice the Pac-12 conference all-around champion.

== Acting and Entertainment ==
Stella studied Theatre at the American Academy of Dramatic Arts in the hopes of becoming an actress. In 2000, she joined Cirque du Soleil and performed Mystère in Las Vegas. In 2002, she performed in Fire Within and then in Varekai as a triple trapeze in 2003. She played small roles in Ghostly Encounters and Delroy Kincaid. She recently had a leading role in a stage play called, 'Pinteresque' which will be in the SummerWorks Performance Festival.

Currently, Stella lives in Australia.
