= Empire (show) =

Contemporary circus show

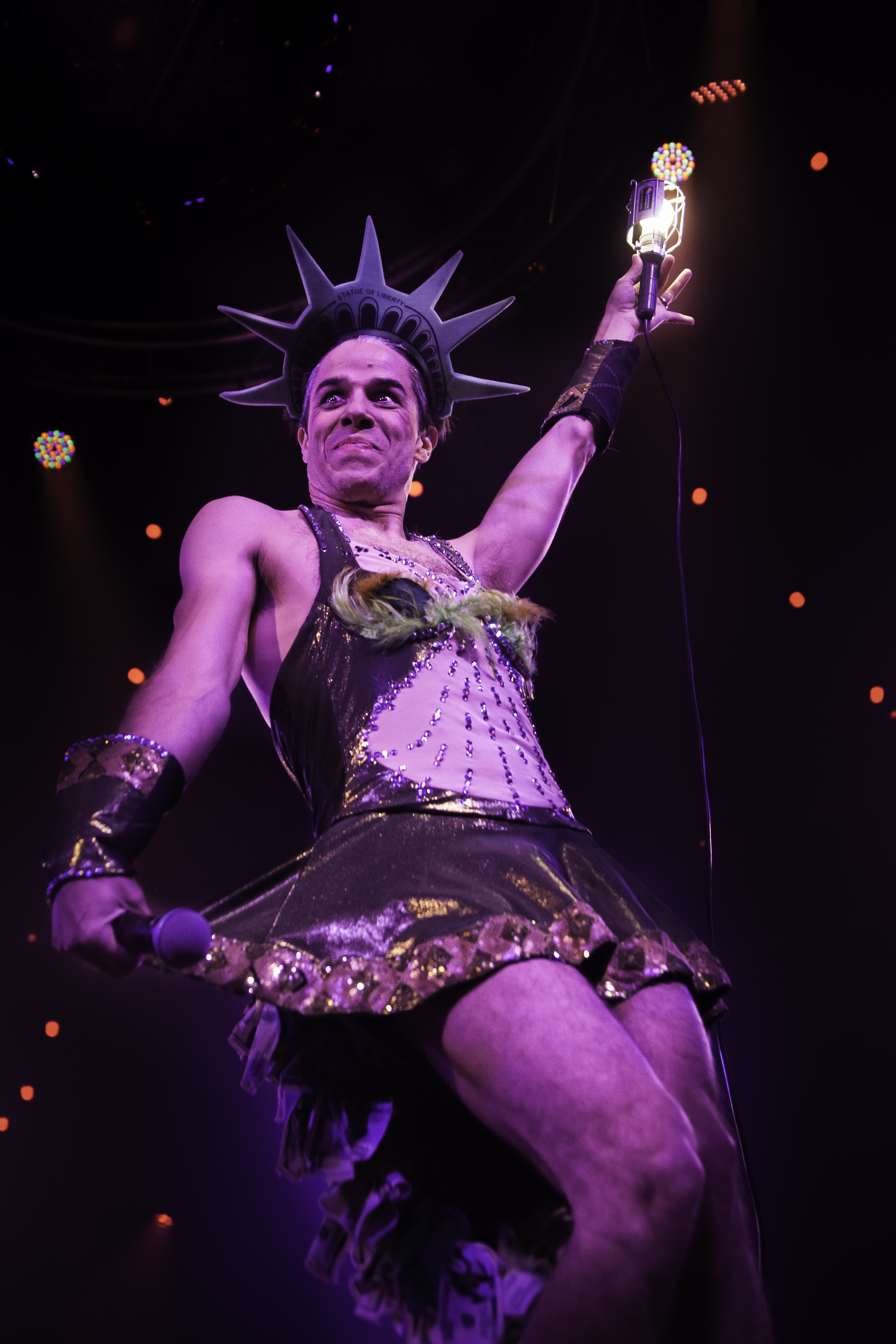
- Jonathan Taylor, hosting Empire
- Company: Spiegelworld
- Genre: Contemporary circus
- Show type: Traveling show
- Date of premiere: 2012

Creative team
- Writer and director: Wayne Harrison
- Producer: Ross Mollison
- Choreographer: John O’Connell
- Official website

Empire is a contemporary circus show that debuted in New York City on May 31, 2012, and was directed by Wayne Harrison.

== Scope ==
The show features a central character, the Impresario, who, following the 2008 financial crisis tried to rebuild his empire. Acts include Elena Lev, foot-juggling, roller-skaters, quick-change routine, shoulder ballet and German wheel. Following its premiere, The New York Times proclaimed that "Spiegelworld has made it the big time", and Time Out New York rated it four stars, saying of the acts "this is timeless stuff: physical feats and illusions that have been practiced for centuries".

Empire played in a 440-seat Spiegeltent on West 45th Street, New York City until September 2, 2012. It then commenced its 2013 Australian tour on January 4 at the Entertainment Quarter in Sydney, in a 700-seat spiegeltent.
