= Mika Kuroki =

Japanese cyclist

Personal information
- Born: 15 November 1971 (age 54) Nara, Japan

Cycling career
- Sport: Cycling

Mika Kuroki (黒木 美香, Kuroki Mika; born 15 November 1971) is a Japanese former cyclist. She competed in the women's sprint at the 1992 Summer Olympics.
