= Hélène Bourdages =

Canadian fencer

Personal information
- Born: 31 October 1959 (age 66)

Sport
- Sport: Fencing

Hélène Bourdages (born 31 October 1959) is a Canadian fencer. She competed in the women's team foil event at the 1992 Summer Olympics.
