= Marcela Hussey =

Argentine field hockey player

Personal information
- Born: April 24, 1967 (age 59)
Medal record
Women's field hockey
Representing Argentina
Pan American Games
Gold medal – first place	1987 Indianapolis	Team

Marcela Inés Hussey (born April 24, 1967) is a retired female field hockey player from Argentina. She was a member of the Women's National Team that finished in seventh place at the 1988 Summer Olympics in Seoul, South Korea after having won the gold medal the previous year at the Pan American Games in Indianapolis.
