= Sue Duggan =

New Zealand field hockey player

Sue Joanne Duggan (born 31 October 1963) is a former field hockey player from New Zealand, who finished in eight position with the National Women's Field Hockey Team, nicknamed The Black Sticks, at the 1992 Summer Olympics in Barcelona.
