= Jennifer Foster (equestrian) =

Canadian equestrian

Personal information
- Born: 7 October 1964 (age 61) Toronto, Ontario, Canada

Sport
- Sport: Equestrian

Jennifer Foster (born 7 October 1964) is a Canadian equestrian. She competed in two events at the 1992 Summer Olympics.
