= Yang Hye-suk =

South Korean hockey player

Personal information
- Nationality: South Korean
- Born: 18 January 1966 (age 60)

Sport
- Sport: Field hockey

Yang Hye-suk (born 18 January 1966) is a South Korean field hockey player. She competed in the women's tournament at the 1992 Summer Olympics.
