= Gregory Williscroft =

Canadian volleyball player (born 1966)

Personal information
- Nationality: Canadian
- Born: 10 February 1966 (age 59); Townsville, Queensland, Australia
- Home town: Calgary, Alberta

Sport
- Sport: Volleyball

Gregory Williscroft (born 10 February 1966) is a Canadian volleyball player. He competed in the men's tournament at the 1992 Summer Olympics.
