= Galina Yenyukhina =

Russian cyclist (born 1959)

Personal information
- Born: 1 October 1959 (age 67) Krasnoyarsk, Soviet Union

Cycling career
- Sport: Cycling

Galina Yenyukhina (born 1 October 1959) is a Russian former cyclist. She competed in the women's sprint at the 1992 Summer Olympics for the Unified Team.
