= Janet Morin =

Canadian gymnast (born 1975)

Personal information
- Born: 25 September 1975 (age 49); Fredericton, New Brunswick, Canada

Sport
- Sport: Gymnastics

Janet Morin (born 25 September 1975) is a Canadian gymnast. She competed in six events at the 1992 Summer Olympics.
