= Annett Neumann =

German cyclist (born 1970)

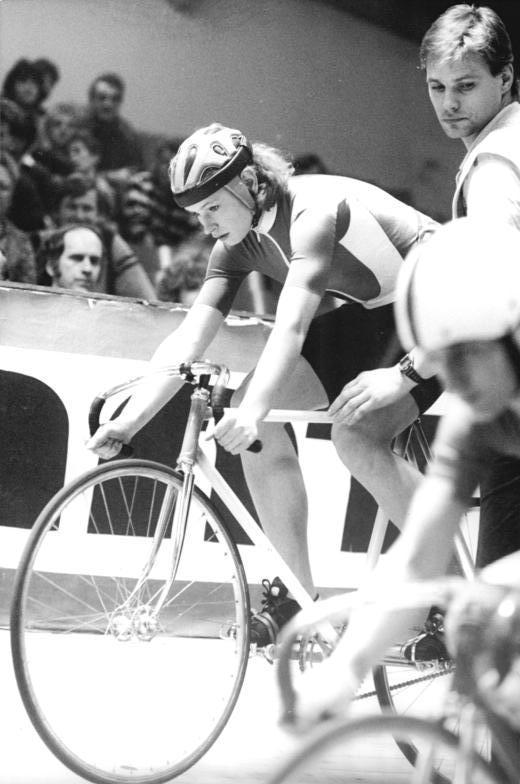
- Annett Neumann

Personal information
- Born: 31 January 1970 (age 56) Lauchhammer, East Germany

Cycling career
- Sport: Cycling
Medal record
Women's cycling
Representing Germany
Olympic Games
Silver medal – second place	1992 Barcelona	Individual Sprint

Annett Neumann (born 31 January 1970) is a German track cyclist who competed at the 1992 Summer Olympics in Barcelona, winning the silver medal in the sprint event.
