= María Gabriela Pazos =

Argentine field hockey player

Personal information
- Born: September 20, 1967 (age 58)
Medal record
Women's field hockey
Representing Argentina
Pan American Games
Gold medal – first place	1991 Havana	Team

María Gabriela Pazos (born September 20, 1967) is a retired female field hockey player from Argentina. She was a member of the Women's National Team that finished in seventh place at the 1988 Summer Olympics in Seoul, South Korea. Three years later she claimed the gold medal at the Pan American Games in Havana, Cuba.
