= Leszek Nowosielski (fencer) =

Canadian fencer (born 1968)

Personal information
- Born: 12 September 1968 (age 57) Montreal, Quebec, Canada

Sport
- Sport: Fencing
Medal record
Representing Canada
Pan American Games
Bronze medal – third place	1995 Mar del Plata	Team sabre

Leszek Nowosielski (born 12 September 1968) is a Canadian former fencer. He competed in the team sabre event at the 1992 Summer Olympics. His older brother Danek Nowosielski is also an Olympic fencer. He was inducted into the Lisgar Collegiate Institute Athletic Wall of Fame in 2009.
