= Rita Razmaitė =

Lithuanian cyclist (born 1967)

Personal information
- Born: 20 June 1967 (age 59) Kretinga, Lithuanian SSR, Soviet Union

Cycling career
- Sport: Cycling

Rita Razmaitė (born 20 June 1967) is a Lithuanian former cyclist. She competed at the 1992 Summer Olympics and the 1996 Summer Olympics.
