= Penny Stamper-Davis =

Canadian sailor

Personal information
- Nationality: Canadian
- Born: 2 March 1968 (age 58) Carlisle, England

Sport
- Sport: Sailing

Penny Stamper-Davis (born 2 March 1968) is a Canadian sailor. She competed at the 1992 Summer Olympics and the 1996 Summer Olympics.
