= Deb Covey =

Canadian field hockey player

Personal information
- Full name: Debra Lee Covey-Barnett
- Born: September 7, 1961 (age 64) Biggar, Saskatchewan, Canada

Sport
- Sport: Field hockey
Medal record
Women's field hockey
Representing Canada
Pan American Games
Silver medal – second place	1991 Havana	Team competition
Bronze medal – third place	1995 Mar del Plata	Team competition

Debra Lee Covey-Barnett (born September 7, 1961, in Biggar, Saskatchewan) is a former field hockey midfielder from Canada, who was a member of the Women's Senior National Team from 1985 to 1994. She earned a total number of 109 international caps for her native country. She was a member of the Canadian team at the 1992 Summer Olympics in Barcelona, Spain.

== International senior competitions ==
- 1986 – World Cup, Amstelveen (Bronze Medal)
- 1987 – Champions Trophy, Amstelveen (4th)
- 1987 – Pan American Games, Indianapolis (Bronze Medal)
- 1988 – Olympic Games, Seoul (6th)
- 1990 – World Cup, Sydney (10th)
- 1991 – Pan American Games, Havana (Silver Medal)
- 1992 – Olympic Games, Barcelona (7th)
- 1994 – World Cup, Dublin (10th)
