= Shelley Wetterberg =

Canadian fencer

Personal information
- Born: 26 August 1971 (age 54) Calgary, Alberta, Canada

Sport
- Sport: Fencing

Shelley Wetterberg (born 26 August 1971) is a Canadian fencer. She competed in the women's team foil event at the 1992 Summer Olympics.
