= Varekai =

Cirque du Soleil touring production

- Logo for Cirque du Soleil's Varekai
- Company: Cirque du Soleil
- Genre: Contemporary circus
- Show type: Touring show
- Date of premiere: April 24, 2002 (Montreal)
- Final show: December 23, 2017 (Frisco, Texas)

Creative team
- Director: Dominic Champagne
- Director of creation: Andrew Watson
- Set designer: Stéphane Roy
- Composer: Violaine Corradi
- Costume designer: Eiko Ishioka
- Lighting designer: Nol van Genuchten
- Choreographers: Michael Montanaro; Bill Shannon
- Sound designer: François Bergeron
- Makeup designer: Nathalie Gagné
- Aerial acts designer: André Simard
- Rigging designer: Jaque Paquin
- Clown act creator: Cahal McCrystal
- Projections: Francis Laporte
- Artistic director: Michael Smith

Other information
- Preceded by: Dralion (1999)
- Succeeded by: Zumanity (2003)
- Official website

Varekai was a Cirque du Soleil touring production that premiered in Montréal in April 2002. Its title means "wherever" in the Romani language, and the show is an "acrobatic tribute to the nomadic soul".

The show begins with the Greek myth of Icarus, picking up where the myth leaves off, reimagining the story of what happened to Icarus after he flew too close to the sun and fell from the sky. In Varekai, rather than drowning in the sea below him, Icarus lands in a lush forest full of exotic creatures.

== Set and technical information ==
The set, created by Stéphane Roy, includes four major components: the forest, stage, catwalk, and lookout. The forest consists of 330 "trees", of which around 20 are climbable. The trees range from 4.5 metres (15 ft) to 10.5 metres (34 ft) in height. The stage is 12.8 metres (42 ft) in diameter and has five trap doors, two turntables, and one elevating platform. The catwalk is 30 metres (98 ft) in length and allows performers to cross over the stage; it ends at a lookout which is 7 square metres (75 sq ft).

== Cast and crew ==
Approximately 95 people travel with the Varekai tour; 50 are artists and the rest are crew. During each engagement in a city, anywhere from 80 to 100 people are hired locally for temporary jobs during the week but mainly for load-in and load-out. The cast and crew is an international one, representing 19 nationalities.

The cast of Varekai includes many unique characters.

- Icarus: Innocent and vulnerable, he finds himself wounded in an unknown world. His desire to live and overcome his fears will drive him to new heights and an eventual rebirth. Icarus was first performed by Russian acrobat Anton Chelnokov who made his Cirque Du Soleil debut as a child, performing the contortion act in Saltimbanco alongside his parents.
- The Betrothed: An exotic creature who enraptures Icarus with her sensual beauty. She will be his guiding light and he, in turn, will be the catalyst for her metamorphosis.
- The Guide: Weathered by the sun of many centuries, he’s like a kindly, fragile great-grandfather—a wise old man whose mission is to inspire and bring about change.
- The Skywatcher: Mad scientist and ingenious inventor, collector of the world’s memories and interpreter of signs, this is a man who receives signals, transforms sounds and forewarns of trials and tribulations. He lives perched on the edge of his laboratory-nest.
- Candide
- Kamikaze
- L'Écureuil
- Blue Lizard
- Ermite
- La Toupie
- Lizard
- Mafioso
- Magioso
- Tampier
- Limping Angel
- Clowns: A comedic duo who like to ruin the artistic flow of the show.
- The Patriarch: He narrates his son Icarus's journey through the magical forest of Varekai.
- The Muse
- The Mother
- Algea
- Na
- Water Meteor

== Acts ==
- Flight of Icarus: Icarus falls from the sky into the forest of Varekai. He rises up and performs an act in an Aerial Net.
- Synchronized Tumbling: Acrobats jump, twist and turn on an inflatable mat often in perfect synchronization. This act replaced Icarian Games as of 2015.
- Dance Trapeze: Suspended high above the stage, a woman performs, dances and contorts in a solo trapeze.
- Magic Act: Claudio and Mooky try to perform a magic act.
- Georgian Dance: This act takes its inspiration from the traditional dances of Caucasus Mountains and includes elements from several mountain dances of the region. Originally performed in the show by former soloists of Georgian State Dance Company; Badri Esatia, Temuri Koridze and Khvicha Tetvadze.
- Slippery Surface: Darting and sliding on a specially designed surface, the artists fling and catch each other, creating an illusion of skating.
- Lounge Singer: Claudio sings Ne Me Quitte Pas while trying to stay in the spotlight, literally.
- Solo on Crutches: Like a jointed puppet, the Limping Angel performs on crutches, sliding around the stage.

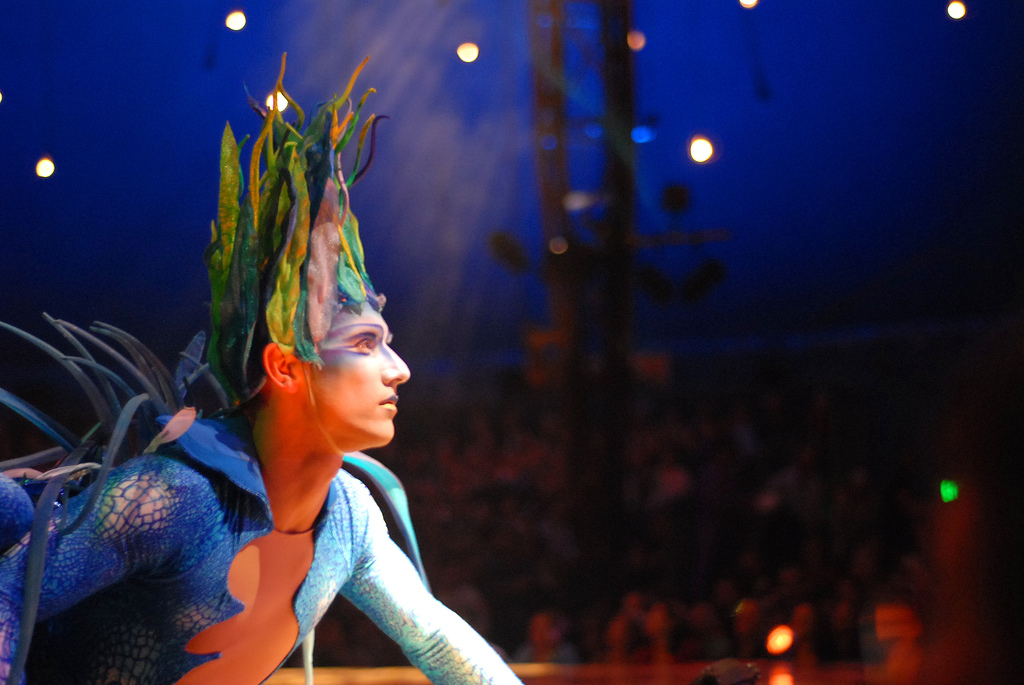
One of the characters in the show. Picture taken in Melbourne.

- Aerial Straps: Two performers fly above the stage, suspended by aerial straps.
- Cyr Wheel: The roue Cyr involves a solo artist spinning, balancing and doing inversions.
- Lightbulb: Always on the lookout for new inventive ways to mess with or interfere in the life of the inhabitants of the forest, the Skywatcher helps the Guide in a dire situation.
- Handbalancing on Canes: La Promise performs an act contorting and spinning gracefully on canes.
- Russian Swing: Acrobats fly into the air and down onto a net, being propelled by two Russian swings. The performers flip, jump and glide into the net, as well as jumping onto the performers' shoulders, as well as jumping from one Russian swing to another.

=== Acts in Rotation ===
- Batons: A world-champion baton performer throws, twirls and manipulates up to three batons at once while performing acrobatics.

=== Retired Acts ===
- Icarian Games: Icarian Games is one of the oldest circus arts disciplines. One of the performers lies on his back and flips, twirls and spins another performer on his feet. This act was replaced by Synchronized Tumbling in 2015.
- Acrobatic Pas de Deux: Two lovers dance and perform acrobatic stunts, showing their love, trust, and respect for each other. This act was replaced by the rotational Aerial Hoop act.
- Water Meteors: Three young acrobats perform an act using water meteors, spinning and juggling them. This act was replaced by Dance Trapeze.
- Triple Trapeze: Four young women perform an act on a suspended Triple Trapeze. This act was taken out when the Arena tour started.
- Aerial hoop: A solo artist flies over the stage on a hoop suspended in the air in an energetic feat of acrobatics. This was a backup act from 2004, and was taken out of the show in early 2013.
- Juggling: An artist manipulates bowling pins, soccer balls, hats and ping-pong balls with his hands, feet, head and even his mouth. This act was removed in 2016.

== Costumes ==
Varekai's costume designer, Eiko Ishioka, set out to design the costumes to heighten the sense of risk and danger the artists face while performing their acts. The designs are an approach to give the traditional leotard a new shape. Eiko drew inspiration from the natural world: plant life, reptiles, land animals, marine life, wind, water, fire and wood. While there are over 130 costumes in the entire collection, over 600 elements combine to make the entire wardrobe of costumes, shoes, hats, and accessories. During the tour it takes 250 hours a week to keep the costumes in a state usable for performance. This includes repairs, cleaning, pressing, repainting (shoes), ironing, and other related tasks.

One of the primary materials used throughout the wardrobe is lycra, primarily for its ease of care, suppleness, and elasticity. Other materials used throughout include titanium rods, nylon sponge and other types of fire-retardant materials. La Toupie's costume, for example, is made from lycra, and the tentacles are made from polystyrene foam. In addition to textures and structures being created for the costumes, digital screen-printing was utilized for some pieces. The costumes for the Russian swing act were inspired by volcanic eruptions. Pictures were taken, scanned, processed and then digitally screen-printed to give the characters their bright red, explosive appearance. The foliage seen on the heads and backs of some characters is made from crinyl and cristalette, which are both extremely lightweight materials. Some of the translucent carapaces seen on some performers, including La Promise, are made from stretch netting mounted on a structure made of boning.

== Music ==
The live music is performed by seven musicians and two singers. Composed by Violaine Corradi and directed by the bandleader/keyboard player, the music features many different genres and energies. Violaine combined the sounds of Hawaiian rituals, 11th-century French troubadour songs, traditional Armenian melodies and gospel music with contemporary arrangements to create the sound of Varekai. While some songs are quiet and sorrowful, others are more upbeat and exciting.

Instruments used in the show include keyboards, bass, drums, percussion, violin, and various wind instruments. There are numerous instrumental solos, with the violin, flute, and accordion among the instruments heard. When these occur, the musician comes into view, still hidden in the trees but slightly visible to the audience. The only cast/crew member to have performed every one of Varekai's 5,219 performances is drummer Paul James Bannerman (www.pauljbannerman.com).

There are two distinct voices in the musical score. Their role is to link the story together, sometimes predicting the future, at other times, propelling the story forward. The female singer called "The Muse" (currently played by Isabelle Corradi) and the male singer called the "Patriarch" (currently played by Jamieson Lindenburg) share the songs alternating between solos with harmonies and duos. The Muse, dressed in white and purple, and The Patriarch, dressed in purple and black, emerge from the forest throughout the show.

=== Album ===
Returning from her work with Cirque du Soleil's Dralion, Violaine Corradi wrote the Varekai score, which was released as a CD album on January 7, 2003. Rather than creating a literal soundtrack, Cirque du Soleil collaborated with Nitin Sawhney to produce a CD with themes and sounds from Varekai but differently arranged. The CD features the vocals of the two original singers of Varekai, Zara Tellander and Mathieu Lavoie; the soundtrack also includes the vocals of world music artists Natacha Atlas and Tina Grace, who were not in the production. Many of the CD tracks are dramatically different from their live counterparts.

In late 2003 Cirque du Soleil created an 'Exclusive Premium Edition' CD, which featured the original CD as well as a bonus CD and DVD containing 6 live tracks, two remixes, and two music videos.

The revised album artwork of Varekai, 2013

Track listing:

1. Aureus (Spoken Word, 2002 - December 23, 2017)
2. Rain One (Interlude, 2002 - December 23, 2017)
3. Le Rêveur (Solo on Crutches, 2002 - December 23, 2017)
4. Vocea (Aerial Net, 2002 - December 23, 2017)
5. Moon Licht (Handbalancing on Canes, 2002 - December 23, 2017)
6. Rubeus (Spoken Word, 2002 - December 23, 2017)
7. Patzivota (Setup to Russian Swing, 2002 - December 23, 2017)
8. El Péndulo (Aerial Straps, 2002 - December 23, 2017)
9. Gitans (Opening, 2002 - December 23, 2017)
10. Kèro Hiréyo
  - Triple Trapeze (2002 - 2013)
  - Aerial Hoop (2013)
  - Dance Trapeze (2014 - December 23, 2017)
11. Infinitus (Spoken Word, 2002 - December 23, 2017)
12. Lubia Dobarstan
  - Water Meteors (2002 - 2013)
  - Batons (Rotation, 2013 - December 23, 2017)
13. Emballa
  - Juggling (2002 - 2016)
  - Cyr Wheel (2016 - December 23, 2017)
14. Oscillum (Russian Swing, 2002 - December 23, 2017)
15. Funambul (Cloud Interlude, 2002 - December 23, 2017)
16. Resolution (Not in Show)

Below are the live tracks, in order as they appear on the Exclusive Premium Edition bonus CD. Listed after each track title is the act associated with the track.

1. Célébration de l'Errance (Opening Dance and Finale, 2002 - December 23, 2017)
2. Trasparenza
  - Acrobatic Pas de Deux (2002 - 2003)
  - Aerial Hoop (Rotation, 2004 - 2013)
3. Euphoria
  - Icarian Games (2002 - 2015)
  - Synchronized Tumbling (2015 - December 23, 2017)
4. Sun Drum Fun (Body Skating, 2002 - December 23, 2017)
5. Mutationis (Handbalancing on Canes, 2002 - December 23, 2017)
6. Movimento (Georgian Dance, 2002 - December 23, 2017)

Below are songs not included on either album:

1. Ne Me Quitte Pas (Clown Act 2002 - December 23, 2017)
2. Las Vegas from Animal Magic (Clown Act 2002 - 2003)
3. Interruptio (Betrothed kidnapping scene)
4. Magique (Clown Act 2004 - 2007)
5. Magique II (Clown Act 2008 - December 23, 2017)
6. Mambo (Interlude 2002 - December 23, 2017)
7. Lightbulb (Clown Act 2002 - December 23, 2017)

The bonus CD also contains two tracks that are remixed versions of "El Péndulo" and "Emballa". In addition, the DVD features two videos with nature and recording footage, set to the CD version of "Patzivota" and "Moon Licht".

=== Vocalists ===
Here is a list of all of the singers in Varekai, since its premiere in 2002.

Female Singers

- Zara Tellander - From April 24, 2002 (Montréal) to July 11, 2004 (Denver)
- Isabelle Corradi - From July 25, 2004 (Boston) to December 23, 2017 (Frisco)

Male Singers

- Mathieu Lavoie - From April 24, 2002 (Montréal) to November 23, 2003 (Los Angeles)
- Craig Jennings - From December 5, 2003 (Pomona) to May 8, 2016 (St. Petersburg)
- Jamieson Lindenburg - From May 11, 2016 (Kazan) to December 23, 2017 (Frisco)

== Filmography ==
The experiences of the initial cast during the creation of the show were portrayed in the television series Cirque du Soleil: Fire Within (featured on the Bravo Network). Fire Within won the 2003 Emmy Award in the "Outstanding Non-Fiction Program" (Alternative) category.

Cirque du Soleil released a film adaptation of Varekai on June 14, 2003, directed by Dominic Champagne and Nick Morris. The filming took place in Toronto during the show's tour and the vocalists in the filming were Zara Tellander and Mathieu Lavoie with Anton Tchelnokov as Icarus, Olga Pikhienko as La Promise/The Betrothed and John Gilkey as The Skywatcher.

== Tour ==
Varekai completed its first North American tour in Vancouver, British Columbia, Canada on July 23, 2006. It debuted in Australia in August 2006 and arrived in New Zealand in early 2007. Later that year, Varekai finished its Australian tour in Perth, and moved on to its first European tour. At the end of 2007 the show had its European premiere in Antwerp, Belgium. It had its UK premiere in 2008 at London's Royal Albert Hall and again on 5 January 2010, marking the 25th anniversary of Cirque du Soleil.

Following the European tour that culminated in Barcelona as 2010 came to a close, the show toured to Taipei, Taiwan; Seoul, South Korea and Manila, Philippines in 2011. The Manila run was exceptional in that the show endured the monsoon season and several typhoons.

In the later half of 2011, Varekai landed in São Paulo and spent twelve months in Brazil before continuing to Argentina and Chile in 2013, and then Peru, Colombia, Costa Rica and Mexico in 2013. Guadalajara followed by Mexico City were the final destinations for the Grand Chapiteau. Varekai had its last performance under the Grand Chapiteau on November 24, 2013.

The show then transferred to the Arena format in late 2013. The city that hosted the transformation was Bossier City, Louisiana, seen in public for the first time on December 12, 2013. After the transformation in Bossier City, Varekai played the Arena version at Centre Bell in Montreal just before Christmas in 2013, honouring the longstanding Cirque tradition of a winter show at the Centre Bell. After its 15-year run, Varekai closed in Frisco, Texas on 23 December 2017.

Varekai has been seen by more than 6 million spectators around the world, and has reached many milestones to accomplish this.

- 1000th performance in Dallas, Texas, in 2004
- 1500th performance in Seattle, Washington, in 2006
- 2000th performance in Perth, Australia, in 2007
- 2500th performance in Seville, Spain, in February 2009
- 3000th performance in Ostend, Belgium, in August 2010
- 3500th performance in Belo Horizonte, Brazil, in February 2012
- 4000th performance in Mexico City, Mexico, in October 2013
- 4500th performance in Winnipeg, Manitoba, Canada, in June 2015
- 5000th performance in Birmingham, United Kingdom, in March 2017

Varekai has been to many different regions. Here is the list of all of them.

- North American Tour - [2002 - 2006]
- Australian Tour - [2006 - 2007]
- European Tour - [2007 - 2011]
- Asia & Pacific Tour - [2011]
- South American Tour - [2011 - 2013]
- North American Arena Tour - [2013 - 2015]
- European Arena Tour - [2015 - October 2017]
- Farewell Tour - [November - December 2017]

Since Varekai's premiere in 2002, it has had an extensive touring history, as detailed below.

The following colorboxes indicate the region of each performance: EU Europe NA North America SA South and Central America AP Asia/Pacific OC Oceania AF Africa

=== Grand Chapiteau Tour ===
2002-2013

==== 2002 schedule ====
- NA Montréal, QC - From 24 Apr to 16 Jun 2002 (show première)
- NA Québec, QC - From 27 Jun to 21 Jul 2002
- NA Toronto, ON - From 1 Aug to 8 Sep 2002
- NA Philadelphia, PA - From 19 Sep to 20 Oct 2002
- NA San Francisco, CA - From 7 Nov to 29 Dec 2002

==== 2003 schedule ====
- NA San Jose, CA - From 16 Jan to 23 Feb 2003
- NA Atlanta, GA - From 6 Mar to 13 Apr 2003
- NA New York, NY - From 24 Apr to 6 Jul 2003
- NA Chicago, IL - From 17 Jul to 31 Aug 2003
- NA Los Angeles, CA - From 12 Sep to 23 Nov 2003
- NA Pomona, CA - From 4 Dec to 28 Dec 2003

==== 2004 schedule ====
- NA Costa Mesa, CA - From 16 Jan to 7 Mar 2004
- NA San Diego, CA - From 18 Mar to 18 Apr 2004
- NA Phoenix, AZ - From 29 Apr to 23 May 2004
- NA Denver, CO - From 3 Jun to 11 Jul 2004
- NA Boston, MA - From 25 Jul to 5 Sep 2004
- NA Washington, DC - From 16 Sep to 24 Oct 2004
- NA Dallas, TX - From 4 Nov to 12 Dec 2004

==== 2005 schedule ====
- NA Houston, TX - From 6 Jan to 13 Feb 2005
- NA Austin, TX - From 24 Feb to 27 Mar 2005
- NA Pittsburgh, PA - From 9 Apr to 8 May 2005
- NA Baltimore, MD - From 19 May to 19 Jun 2005
- NA East Rutherford, NJ - From 30 Jun to 31 Jul 2005
- NA Columbus, OH - From 11 Aug to 11 Sep 2005
- NA Hartford, CT - From 22 Sep to 16 Oct 2005
- NA Charlotte, NC - From 27 Oct to 20 Nov 2005
- NA St. Petersburg, FL - From 1 Dec to 31 Dec 2005

==== 2006 schedule ====
- NA Miami, FL - From 20 Jan to 26 Feb 2006
- NA Portland, OR - From 14 Mar to 23 Apr 2006
- NA Seattle, WA - From 4 May to 11 Jun 2006
- NA Vancouver, BC - From 22 Jun to 23 Jul 2006
- OC Sydney, AU - From 10 Aug to 29 Oct 2006
- OC Brisbane, AU - From 9 Nov to 16 Dec 2006

==== 2007 schedule ====
- OC Auckland, NZ - From 5 Jan to 18 Feb 2007
- OC Canberra, AU - From 15 Mar to 8 Apr 2007
- OC Melbourne, AU - From 19 Apr to 24 Jun 2007
- OC Adelaide, AU - From 5 Jul to 4 Aug 2007
- OC Perth, AU - From 17 Aug to 7 Oct 2007
- EU Antwerp, BE - From 25 Oct to 16 Dec 2007

==== 2008 schedule ====
(Varekai played in the Royal Albert Hall in London, UK during this time)

- EU Amsterdam, NL - From 29 Feb to 25 May 2008
- EU Berlin, DE - From 6 Jun to 20 Jul 2008
- EU Oberhausen, DE - From 31 Jul to 7 Sep 2008
- EU Vienna, AT - From 18 Sep to 26 Oct 2008
- EU Madrid, ES - From 13 Nov 2008 to 4 Jan 2009

==== 2009 schedule ====
- EU Seville, ES - From 29 Jan to 15 Mar 2009
- EU Bilbao, ES - From 26 Mar to 3 May 2009
- EU Lisbon, PT - From 15 May to 28 Jun 2009
- EU Gijon, ES - From 9 Jul to 16 Aug 2009
- EU Hamburg, DE - From 28 Aug to 4 Oct 2009
- EU Moscow, RU - From 23 Oct to 13 Dec 2009

==== 2010 schedule ====
(Varekai played in the Royal Albert Hall in London, UK during this time)

- EU Manchester, UK - From 25 Feb to 21 Mar 2010
- EU Munich, DE - From 1 Apr to 2 May 2010
- EU Cologne, DE - From 13 May to 6 Jun 2010
- EU Frankfurt, DE - From 17 Jun to 18 Jul 2010
- EU Oostende, BE - From 29 Jul to 29 Aug 2010
- EU Zurich, CH - From 17 Sep to 24 Oct 2010
- EU Barcelona, ES - From 5 Nov 2010 to 2 Jan 2011

==== 2011 schedule ====
- AP Taipei, TW - From 20 Jan to 6 Mar 2011
- AP Seoul, KR - From 6 Apr to 29 May 2011
- AP Manila, PH - From 22 Jun to 24 Jul 2011
- SA São Paulo, BR - From 15 Sep to 27 Nov 2011
- SA Rio de Janeiro, BR - From 8 Dec 2011 to 8 Jan 2012

==== 2012 schedule ====
- SA Belo Horizonte, BR - From 19 Jan to 12 Feb 2012
- SA Brasília, BR - From 23 Feb to 18 Mar 2012
- SA Recife, BR - From 30 Mar to 22 Apr 2012
- SA Salvador, BR - From 3 May to 3 Jun 2012
- SA Curitiba, BR - From 15 Jun to 15 Jul 2012
- SA Porto Alegre, BR - From 26 Jul to 26 Aug 2012
- SA Buenos Aires, AR - From 7 Sep to 21 Oct 2012
- SA Santiago, CL - From 13 Nov to 28 Dec 2012

==== 2013 schedule ====
- SA Lima, PE - From 17 Jan to 24 Feb 2013
- SA Bogota, CO - From 21 Mar to 5 May 2013
- NA San José, CR - From 31 May to 30 Jun 2013
- NA Guadalajara, MX - From 14 Aug to 8 Sep 2013
- NA Mexico City, MX - From 19 Sep to 24 Nov 2013

==== 2017 schedule ====
- EU PortAventura World, ES - From 6 Jul to 13 Aug 2017

=== Arena Tour ===
2008, 2010, 2013-2017

==== 2008 schedule ====
- EU Royal Albert Hall, London, UK - From 5 Jan to 17 Feb 2008

==== 2010 schedule ====
- EU Royal Albert Hall, London, UK - From 6 Jan to 14 Feb 2010

==== 2013 schedule ====
- NA Bossier City, LA - From 13 Dec to 14 Dec 2013
- NA Montréal, QC - From 20 Dec to 30 Dec 2013

==== 2014 schedule ====
- NA Kingston, ON - From 16 Jan 2014 to 19 Jan 2014
- NA Windsor, ON - From 23 Jan 2014 to 26 Jan 2014
- NA Hamilton, ON - From 29 Jan 2014 to 2 Feb 2014
- NA Detroit, MI - From 5 Feb 2014 to 9 Feb 2014
- NA Youngstown, OH - From 12 Feb 2014 to 16 Feb 2014
- NA Frisco, TX - From 19 Feb 2014 to 23 Feb 2014
- NA Cedar Park, TX - From 26 Feb 2014 to 2 Mar 2014
- NA Beaumont, TX - From 5 Mar 2014 to 9 Mar 2014
- NA Baton Rouge, LA - From 12 Mar 2014 to 16 Mar 2014
- NA Pensacola, FL - From 19 Mar 2014 to 23 Mar 2014
- NA Pittsburgh, PA - From 27 Mar 2014 to 30 Mar 2014
- NA East Lansing, MI - From 2 Apr 2014 to 6 Apr 2014
- NA Knoxville, TN - From 9 Apr 2014 to 13 Apr 2014
- NA Loveland, CO - From 1 May to 4 May 2014
- NA Broomfield, CO - From 7 May to 11 May 2014
- NA Kansas City, MO - From 14 May to 18 May 2014
- NA Oshawa, ON - From 21 May 2014 to 25 May 2014
- NA London, ON - From 28 May 2014 to 1 Jun 2014
- NA Bridgeport, CT - From 4 Jun 2014 to 8 Jun 2014
- NA Hartford, CT - From 11 Jun 2014 to 15 Jun 2014
- NA Bangor, ME - From 18 Jun to 22 Jun 2014
- NA Manchester, NH - From 25 Jun to 29 Jun 2014
- NA Providence, RI - From 1 Jul 2014 to 6 Jul 2014
- NA Indianapolis, IN - From 24 Jul to 27 Jul 2014
- NA Brooklyn, NY - From 30 Jul to 3 Aug 2014
- NA Cleveland, OH - From 6 Aug to 10 Aug 2014
- NA Erie, PA - From 13 Aug to 17 Aug 2014
- NA Atlantic City, NJ - From 20 Aug to 24 Aug 2014
- NA Newark, NJ - From 27 Aug to 31 Aug 2014
- NA Portland, ME - From 3 Sep to 7 Sep 2014
- NA Philadelphia, PA - From 10 Sep to 14 Sep 2014
- NA Orlando, FL - From 17 Sep to 21 Sep 2014
- NA Estero, FL - From 24 Sep to 28 Sep 2014
- NA Highland Heights, KY - From 16 Oct to 19 Oct 2014
- NA Roanoke, VA - From 22 Oct to 26 Oct 2014
- NA Hershey, PA - From 29 Oct to 2 Nov 2014
- NA Columbia, SC - From 5 Nov to 9 Nov 2014
- NA Hampton, VA - From 12 Nov to 16 Nov 2014
- NA New Orleans, LA - From 19 Nov to 23 Nov 2014
- NA Sioux Falls, SD - From 11 Dec to 14 Dec 2014
- NA Milwaukee, WI - From 18 Dec to 21 Dec 2014
- NA Minneapolis, MN - From 25 Dec to 28 Dec 2014
- NA Colorado Springs, CO - From 31 Dec 2014 to 4 Jan 2015

==== 2015 schedule ====
- NA St. Louis, MO - From 7 Jan to 11 Jan 2015
- NA Wichita, KS - From 14 Jan to 18 Jan 2015
- NA Tulsa, OK - From 21 Jan to 25 Jan 2015
- NA Oklahoma City, OK - From 28 Jan to 1 Feb 2015
- NA San Antonio, TX - From 4 Feb to 8 Febr 2015
- NA Rio Rancho, NM - From 11 Feb to 15 Feb 2015
- NA Phoenix, AZ - From 18 Feb to 22 Feb 2015
- NA San Diego, CA - From 25 Feb to 1 Mar 2015
- NA El Paso, TX - From 18 Mar to 22 Mar 2015
- NA Fresno, CA - From 25 Mar to 29 Mar 2015
- NA Bakersfield, CA - From 1 Apr to 5 Apr 2015
- NA Sacramento, CA - From 8 Apr to 12 Apr 2015
- NA Stockton, CA - From 15 Apr to 19 Apr 2015
- NA West Valley City, UT - From 22 Apr to 26 Apr 2015
- NA Spokane, WA - From 29 Apr to 3 May 2015
- NA Portland, OR - From 6 May to 10 May 2015
- NA Penticton, BC - From 13 May to 17 May 2015
- NA Vancouver, BC - From 20 May to 24 May 2015
- NA Victoria, BC - From 27 May to 31 May 2015
- NA Edmonton, AB - From 18 Jun to 21 Jun 2015
- NA Winnipeg, MB - From 24 Jun to 28 Jun 2015
- NA Ottawa, ON - From 2 Jul to 5 Jul 2015
- NA Baltimore, MD - From 8 Jul to 12 Jul 2015
- NA Boston, MA - From 15 Jul to 19 Jul 2015
- NA Fairfax, VA - From 22 Jul to 26 Jul 2015
- NA Duluth, GA - From 29 Jul to 2 Aug 2015
- NA Tampa, FL - From 5 Aug to 9 Aug 2015
- NA Sunrise, FL - From 12 Aug to 23 Aug 2015
- NA Nashville, TN - From 26 Aug to 30 Aug 2015
- NA Toronto, ON - From 2 Sep to 6 Sep 2015
- EU Berlin, DE - From 8 Oct to 11 Oct 2015
- EU Leipzig, DE - From 14 Oct to 18 Oct 2015
- EU Stuttgart, DE - From 21 Oct to 25 Oct 2015
- EU Mannheim, DE - From 28 Oct to 1 Nov 2015
- EU Vienna, AT - From 4 Nov to 8 Nov 2015
- EU Dortmund, DE - From 11 Nov to 15 Nov 2015
- EU Cologne, DE - From 19 Nov to 22 Nov 2015
- EU Innsbruck, AT - From 25 Nov to 29 Nov 2015
- EU Munich, DE - From 2 Dec to 6 Dec 2015
- EU A Coruña, ES - From 22 Dec to 28 Dec 2015

==== 2016 schedule ====
- EU Barcelona, ES - From 1 Jan to 10 Jan 2016
- EU Valencia, ES - From 14 Jan to 17 Jan 2016
- EU Malaga, ES - From 21 Jan to 24 Jan 2016
- EU Vitoria-Gasteiz, ES - From 27 Jan to 31 Jan 2016
- EU Lyon, FR - From 3 Feb to 7 Feb 2016
- EU Hamburg, DE - From 10 Feb to 14 Feb 2016
- EU Luxembourg, LU - From 17 Feb to 21 Feb 2016
- EU Hanover, DE - From 24 Feb to 28 Feb 2016
- EU Antwerp, BE - From 2 Mar to 6 Mar 2016
- EU Bordeaux, FR - From 10 Mar to 13 Mar 2016
- EU Montpellier, FR - From 17 Mar to 20 Mar 2016
- EU Nice, FR - From 23 Mar to 27 Mar 2016
- EU Moscow, RU - From 14 Apr to 24 Apr 2016
- EU St-Petersburg, RU - From 27 Apr to 8 May 2016
- EU Kazan, RU - From 11 May to 15 May 2016
- EU Chelyabinsk, RU - From 18 May to 22 May 2016
- EU Togliatti, RU - From 25 May to 29 May 2016
- EU Sochi, RU - From 2 Jun to 5 Jun 2016
- EU Zaragoza, ES - From 29 Jun to 3 Jul 2016
- EU Santander, ES - From 6 Jul to 10 Jul 2016
- EU Granada, ES - From 13 Jul to 17 Jul 2016
- EU Murcia, ES - From 20 Jul to 24 Jul 2016
- AP Beirut, LB – From 7 Sep to 11 Sep 2016
- AP Dubai, UAE – From 16 Sep to 24 Sep 2016
- AP Doha, QA – From 27 Sep to 30 Sep 2016
- EU Istanbul, TR – From 5 Oct to 9 Oct 2016
- EU Ljubljana, SI - From 14 Oct to 15 Oct 2016 (Postponed to 2017)
- EU Milan, IT - From 20 Oct to 23 Oct 2016
- EU Florence, IT - From 27 Oct to 30 Oct 2016
- EU Bologna, IT - From 3 Nov to 6 Nov 2016
- EU Turin, IT - From 10 Nov to 13 Nov 2016
- EU Nantes, FR - From 16 Nov to 20 Nov 2016
- EU Toulouse, FR - From 23 Nov to 27 Nov 2016
- EU Strasbourg, FR - From 23 Nov to 4 Dec 2016
- EU Paris, FR - From 7 Dec to 11 Dec 2016
- EU Lille, FR - From 14 Dec to 18 Dec 2016

==== 2017 schedule ====
- EU Lisbon, PT - From 5 Jan to 15 Jan 2017
- EU Seville, ES - From 18 Jan to 21 Jan 2017
- EU Gijon, ES - From 25 Jan to 28 Jan 2017
- EU Sheffield, UK - From 2 Feb to 5 Feb 2017
- EU Dublin, IE - From 8 Feb to 12 Feb 2017
- EU Newcastle, UK - From 15 Feb to 19 Feb 2017
- EU Leeds, UK - From 22 Feb to 26 Feb 2017
- EU Birmingham, UK - From 2 Mar to 5 Mar 2017
- EU Nottingham, UK - From 8 Mar to 12 Mar 2017
- EU Glasgow, UK - From 15 Mar to 19 Mar 2017
- EU Copenhagen, DK - From 23 Mar to 26 Mar 2017
- EU Lyon, FR - From 13 Apr to 16 Apr 2017
- EU Amsterdam, NL - From 20 Apr to 23 Apr 2017
- EU Bratislava, SK - From 27 Apr to 30 Apr 2017
- EU Bucharest, RO - From 3 May to 7 May 2017
- EU Budapest, HU - From 12 May to 14 May 2017
- EU Prague, CZ - From 18 May to 21 May 2017
- EU Sofia, BG - From 26 May to 28 May 2017
- EU Ljubljana, SI - From 2 Jun to 4 Jun 2017
- EU Vilnius, LT - From 8 Jun to 11 Jun 2017

==== 2017 schedule ====
(Varekai played under the Grand Chapiteau in PortAventura World, ES during this time)

- EU Oslo, NO - From 1 Sep to 3 Sep 2017
- EU Malmo, SE - From 6 Sep to 10 Sep 2017
- EU Tallinn, EE - From 14 Sep to 17 Sep 2017
- EU Riga, LV - From 20 Sep to 24 Sep 2017
- EU Minsk, BY - From 28 Sep to 1 Oct 2017
- EU Helsinki, FI - From 5 Oct to 8 Oct 2017
- EU Stockholm, SE - From 11 Oct to 15 Oct 2017
- NA Allentown, PA - From 9 Nov to 12 Nov 2017
- NA Syracuse, NY - From 15 Nov to 19 Nov 2017
- NA Philadelphia, PA - From 22 Nov to 26 Nov 2017
- NA Biloxi, MS - From 29 Nov to 3 Dec 2017
- NA Hidalgo, TX - From 6 Dec to 10 Dec 2017
- NA Fort Worth, TX - From 13 Dec to 17 Dec 2017
- NA Frisco, TX - From 20 Dec to 23 Dec 2017 (final show)
