= Rochelle Low =

Canadian field hockey player

Personal information
- Full name: Rochelle Maria Low
- Born: May 19, 1969 (age 57) Vancouver, British Columbia

Sport
- Sport: Field hockey
Medal record
Women's field hockey
Representing Canada
Pan American Games
Silver medal – second place	1991 Havana	Team competition

Rochelle Maria Low (born May 19, 1969 in Vancouver, British Columbia) is a former field hockey player from Canada, who represented her native country at the 1992 Summer Olympics in Barcelona, Spain. There she ended up in seventh place with the Canadian National Women's Team. She was affiliated with the University of Victoria.
