= Ian Soellner =

Canadian modern pentathlete (born 1969)

Personal information
- Full name: Ian Blair Soellner
- Born: June 15, 1969 (age 57) Sidney, British Columbia, Canada

Sport
- Sport: Modern pentathlon

Ian Blair Soellner (born June 15, 1969) is a Canadian modern pentathlete. He competed at the 1992 Summer Olympics.
