= Allan Francis =

Canadian fencer

Personal information
- Born: 3 May 1971 (age 55) Peace River, Alberta, Canada

Sport
- Sport: Fencing

Allan Francis (born 3 May 1971) is a Canadian fencer. He competed in the team épée event at the 1992 Summer Olympics.Allan now resides on the West coast of Canada and is an registered architect in the province of BC. He has had a hand in a number of large scale projects including Douglas, Edgewood, and Maddaugh elementary schools for Surrey School District. He also has made major contributions to a number of civic and healthcare projects in BC as well as Alberta.
