= Milena Gaiga =

Canadian field hockey player

Milena Gaiga (born August 30, 1964, in Port Alberni, British Columbia) is a former hockey player from Canada, who represented her native country at the 1992 Summer Olympics in Barcelona, Spain. There she ended up in seventh place with the Canadian National Women's Team.
