= Rachel Hunter (equestrian) =

Canadian equestrian

Personal information
- Nationality: Canadian
- Born: 7 June 1969 (age 55)

Sport
- Sport: Equestrian

Rachel Hunter (born 7 June 1969) is a Canadian equestrian. She competed in two events at the 1992 Summer Olympics.
