= Field hockey at the 1984 Summer Olympics – Women's team squads =

List of hockey players

The following is the list of squads that took place in the women's field hockey tournament at the 1984 Summer Olympics.

== Australia ==
The following players represented Australia:

- Kym Ireland
- Liane Tooth
- Pamela Glossop
- Susan Watkins
- Lorraine Hillas
- Robyn Leggatt
- Sandra Pisani
- Penny Gray
- Robyn Holmes
- Sharon Buchanan
- Marian Aylmore
- Colleen Pearce
- Loretta Dorman
- Julene Sunderland
- Trisha Heberle
- Evelyn Botfield

== Canada ==
The following players represented Canada:

- Laurie Lambert
- Sharon Creelman
- Jean Major
- Laura Branchaud
- Lynne Beecroft
- Shelley Andrews
- Darlene Stoyka
- Phyllis Ellis
- Karen Hewlett
- Diane Virjee
- Terry Wheatley
- Lisa Bauer
- Sheila Forshaw
- Sharon Bayes
- Zoe MacKinnon
- Nancy Charlton

== Netherlands ==
The following players represented the Netherlands:

- Det de Beus
- Alette Pos
- Margriet Zegers
- Laurien Willemse
- Marjolein Eijsvogel
- Fieke Boekhorst
- Carina Benninga
- Sandra Le Poole
- Elsemieke Hillen
- Marieke van Doorn
- Sophie von Weiler
- Aletta van Manen
- Irene Hendriks
- Lisette Sevens
- Martine Ohr
- Anneloes Nieuwenhuizen

== New Zealand ==
The following players represented New Zealand:

- Lesley Murdoch
- Barbara Tilden
- Mary Clinton
- Sue McLeish
- Isobel Thomson
- Sandra Mackie
- Jillian Smith
- Jane Goulding
- Robyn Blackman
- Jan Martin
- Harina Kohere
- Jennifer McDonald
- Shirley Haig
- Cathy Thompson
- Lesley Elliott
- Christine Arthur

== United States ==
The following players represented the United States:

- Gwen Cheeseman
- Beth Anders
- Kathleen McGahey
- Anita Miller
- Regina Buggy
- Christine Larson-Mason
- Beth Beglin
- Marcella Place
- Julie Staver
- Diane Moyer
- Sheryl Johnson
- Charlene Morett
- Karen Shelton
- Brenda Stauffer
- Leslie Milne
- Judy Strong

== West Germany ==
The following players represented West Germany:

- Ursula Thielemann
- Elke Drüll
- Beate Deininger
- Christina Moser
- Hella Roth
- Dagmar Bremer
- Birgit Hagen
- Birgit Hahn
- Gaby Appel
- Andrea Weiermann-Lietz
- Corinna Lingnau
- Martina Hallmen
- Gabriela Schöwe
- Patricia Ott
- Susanne Schmid
- Sigrid Landgraf
