= 1981 Women's Hockey World Cup =

FIH World Cup

Tournament details
- Host country: Argentina
- City: Buenos Aires
- Teams: 12
- Venue: CeNARD

Final positions
- Champions: West Germany (2nd title)
- Runner-up: Netherlands
- Third place: Soviet Union

Tournament statistics
- Matches played: 42
- Goals scored: 156 (3.71 per match)
- Top scorer: (Netherlands) Fieke Boekhorst (13 goals)

The 1981 Women's Hockey World Cup was the fourth edition of the Women's Hockey World Cup, a field hockey tournament. It was held from the 27 March to 5 April 1981 at the CeNARD in Buenos Aires, Argentina.

West Germany won the tournament for a second time, defeating the Netherlands 3–1 in penalties after the final finished as a 1–1 draw. The Soviet Union finished in third place after defeating Australia 5–1.

== Teams ==
Including the host nation, Argentina, 12 teams participated in the tournament:

- Argentina
- Australia
- Austria
- Belgium
- Canada
- France
- Japan
- Mexico
- Netherlands
- Soviet Union
- Spain
- West Germany

== Results ==
=== Preliminary round ===
==== Pool A ====
Pos	Team	Pld	W	D	L	GF	GA	GD	Pts	Qualification
1	West Germany	5	5	0	0	18	2	+16	10	Semi-finals
2	Soviet Union	5	3	0	2	15	4	+11	6	Semi-finals
3	Argentina (H)	5	3	0	2	12	9	+3	6	
4	Japan	5	2	0	3	9	16	−7	4	
5	Mexico	5	2	0	3	7	15	−8	4	
6	France	5	0	0	5	5	20	−15	0	

Source: FIH
Rules for classification: 1) points; 2) goal difference; 3) goals scored; 4) head-to-head result.
(H) Hosts

27 March 1981
07:30

Soviet Union	5–0	France
	Report

27 March 1981
09:00

West Germany	2–0	Mexico
	Report

27 March 1981
15:45

Argentina	2–3	Japan
	Report

28 March 1981
15:00

Japan	0–5	Soviet Union
	Report

28 March 1981
17:00

West Germany	5–1	France
	Report

29 March 1981
07:30

Mexico	1–6	Argentina
	Report

30 March 1981
07:30

Japan	1–4	West Germany
	Report

30 March 1981
15:00

Argentina	2–0	Soviet Union
	Report

30 March 1981
17:00

France	1–4	Mexico
	Report

31 March 1981
17:00

Soviet Union	0–2	West Germany
	Report

1 April 1981
07:30

Mexico	2–1	Japan
	Report

1 April 1981
09:00

Argentina	2–0	France
	Report

2 April 1981
09:30

France	3–4	Japan
	Report

2 April 1981
15:30

Soviet Union	5–0	Mexico
	Report

2 April 1981
17:30

West Germany	5–0	Argentina
	Report

==== Pool B ====
Pos	Team	Pld	W	D	L	GF	GA	GD	Pts	Qualification
1	Netherlands	5	5	0	0	20	0	+20	10	Semi-finals
2	Australia	5	4	0	1	15	3	+12	8	Semi-finals
3	Canada	5	3	0	2	8	10	−2	6	
4	Belgium	5	2	0	3	5	12	−7	4	
5	Spain	5	0	1	4	0	10	−10	1	
6	Austria	5	0	1	4	2	15	−13	1	

Source: FIH
Rules for classification: 1) points; 2) goal difference; 3) goals scored; 4) head-to-head result.

27 March 1981
14:15

Netherlands	7–0	Belgium
	Report

27 March 1981
17:15

Canada	3–0	Spain
Branchaud; Dana Sinclair; Forshaw	Report

28 March 1981

Australia	6–0	Austria
Glossop 9' 25'; Watkins 32' 68'; Terry Wharton 40' 60'	Report

28 March 1981
09:30

Belgium	1–2	Canada
	Report

29 March 1981
09:30

Australia	0–2	Netherlands
	Report	Boekhorst

29 March 1981
15:00

Spain	0–0	Austria
	Report

30 March 1981
09:30

Canada	0–4	Netherlands
	Report

31 March 1981
07:30

Austria	1–3	Belgium
	Report

31 March 1981
09:30

Spain	0–3	Australia
	Report

1 April 1981
13:00

Australia	4–1	Canada
	Report

1 April 1981
15:00

Netherlands	4–0	Austria
	Report

1 April 1981
17:00

Belgium	1–0	Spain
	Report

2 April 1981
07:30

Austria	1–2	Canada
	Report

2 April 1981
11:30

Netherlands	3–0	Spain
	Report

2 April 1981
13:30

Belgium	0–2	Australia
	Report

=== Classification round ===
==== Ninth to twelfth place classification ====
Crossover
4 April 1981
Mexico	0
Spain	2
4 April 1981
France	1
Austria	0

Ninth Place
5 April 1981
Spain	0
France	2
Eleventh Place
5 April 1981
Mexico	1
Austria	0

===== Crossover =====
4 April 1981
07:30

France	1–0	Austria
	Report

4 April 1981
11:30

Mexico	0–2	Spain
	Report

===== Eleventh and twelfth place =====
5 April 1981
07:30

Mexico	1–0	Austria
	Report

===== Ninth and tenth place =====
5 April 1981
09:30

Spain	0–2	France
	Report

==== Fifth to eighth place classification ====
Crossover
4 April 1981
Argentina	3
Belgium	1
4 April 1981
Canada	3
Japan	1

Fifth Place
5 April 1981
Argentina	0
Canada	3
Seventh Place
5 April 1981
Belgium	1 (2)
Japan (pen.)	1 (4)

===== Crossover =====
4 April 1981
09:30

Canada	3–1	Japan
	Report

4 April 1981
13:30

Argentina	3–1	Belgium
Branchaud 27'; Forshaw	Report

===== Seventh and eighth place =====
5 April 1981
11:30

Belgium	1–1	Japan
	Report
Penalties
	2–4

===== Fifth and sixth place =====
5 April 1981
13:30

Argentina	0–3	Canada
	Report

==== First to fourth place classification ====
Semi-finals
4 April 1981
West Germany	2
Australia	1
4 April 1981
Netherlands	7
Soviet Union	3

Final
5 April 1981
West Germany (pen.)	1 (3)
Netherlands	1 (1)
Third Place
5 April 1981
Australia	1
Soviet Union	5

===== Crossover =====
4 April 1981
15:30

West Germany	2–1	Australia
	Report

4 April 1981
17:30

Netherlands	7–3	Soviet Union
	Report

===== Third and fourth place =====
5 April 1981
15:30

Australia	1–5	Soviet Union
	Report

===== Final =====
5 April 1981
17:30

West Germany	1–1	Netherlands
	Report
Penalties
	3–1

1981 Women's Hockey World Cup winner

West Germany
Second title

== Medallists ==
The following are the squads of the three medalling nations, as well as fourth placed Australia:

West Germany
1. Silke Birkenfeld
2. Susanne Schmid (GK)
3. Gudrun Neumann
4. Christina Moser
5. Elke Drüll
6. Ingrid Bruckert-Redmer
7. Birgit Hagen (C)
9. Gabriele Appel
10. Stefanie Burger
11. Corinna Lingnau
12. Martina Koch
16. Karen Haude
17. Sigrid Landgraf
18. Eva Pagels
19. Doris Manthei
20. Dorothea Marx
Netherlands
1. Bernadette de Beus (GK)
2. Toos Bax
3. Margriet Zegers
4. Margriet Bleijerveld
5. Marjolein Bolhuis-Eijsvogel (C)
6. Fieke Boekhorst
7. Anneke Bax
8. Sandra Le Poole
9. Elsemieke Hillen
11. Sophie von Weiler
12. Annelies Kapten
13. Irene Hendriks
14. Lisette Sevens (C)
15. Vib Ramaer
16. José Poelmans
17. Madelon Beliën
Soviet Union
1. Galina Inzhuvatova (GK)
2. Larisa Chizhik
3. Tatiana Chotchayeva
4. Nadezhda Filippova
5. Natella Krasnikova (C)
6. Natalia Bykova
7. Lidiya Glubokova
9. Natalia Buzunova
10. Galina Konyukhova
11. Nadezhda Gulyaeva
12. Leyla Akhmerova
13. Nelli Gorbatkova
14. Lyudmila Frolova
15. Nadezhda Ovechikna
16. Tatyana Shvyganova
17. Valentina Zazdravnkyh
Australia
1. Kym Ireland (GK)
2. Robyn Morrison
3. Pamela Glossop
4. Adele Boyce
5. Lorraine Hillas
6. Robyn Leggatt
7. Sandra Pisani
8. Sharyn Simpson
9. Susan Watkins
10. Diane Gorman (C)
11. Sharon Buchanan
12. Colleen Pearce
13. Kerry Wharton
14. Julene Grant
15. Janette McCloud
16. Susan Skirrow

== Statistics ==
=== Final standings ===
As per statistical convention in field hockey, matches decided in extra time are counted as wins and losses, while matches decided by penalty shoot-outs are counted as draws.

Pos	Grp	Team	Pld	W	D	L	GF	GA	GD	Pts	Final result
1st place, gold medalist(s)	A	West Germany	7	6	1	0	21	4	+17	13	Gold Medal
2nd place, silver medalist(s)	B	Netherlands	7	6	1	0	28	4	+24	13	Silver Medal
3rd place, bronze medalist(s)	A	Soviet Union	7	4	0	3	23	12	+11	8	Bronze Medal
4	B	Australia	7	4	0	3	17	10	+7	8	Fourth place
5	B	Canada	7	5	0	2	14	11	+3	10	Eliminated in group stage
6	A	Argentina (H)	7	4	0	3	15	13	+2	8	Eliminated in group stage
7	A	Japan	7	2	1	4	11	20	−9	5	Eliminated in group stage
8	B	Belgium	7	2	1	4	7	16	−9	5	Eliminated in group stage
9	A	France	7	2	0	5	8	20	−12	4	Eliminated in group stage
10	B	Spain	7	1	1	5	2	12	−10	3	Eliminated in group stage
11	A	Mexico	7	3	0	4	8	17	−9	6	Eliminated in group stage
12	B	Austria	7	0	1	6	2	17	−15	1	Eliminated in group stage

Source: FIH
(H) Hosts
