= 1983 Women's Hockey World Cup =

International field hockey tournament

1983 Hockey World Cup
Tournament details
- Host country: Malaysia
- City: Kuala Lumpur
- Teams: 12

Final positions
- Champions: Netherlands (3rd title)
- Runner-up: Canada
- Third place: Australia

Tournament statistics
- Matches played: 42
- Goals scored: 109 (2.6 per match)
- Top scorer: (England) Jane Swinnerton-Ions (9 goals)

The 1983 Women's Hockey World Cup was the fifth edition of the Women's Hockey World Cup field hockey tournament. It was held from 10 April to 23 April in Kuala Lumpur, Malaysia.

It was won by the Netherlands, who defeated Canada 4–2 in the final. Host nation Malaysia did not participate in the tournament.

== Results ==
=== Pool A ===
Pos	Team	Pld	W	D	L	GF	GA	GD	Pts	Qualification
1	Netherlands	5	4	1	0	7	2	+5	9	Semi-finals
2	Australia	5	2	2	1	10	6	+4	6	Semi-finals
3	United States	5	2	2	1	6	3	+3	6	
4	Scotland	5	1	3	1	4	5	−1	5	
5	Wales	5	0	3	2	5	11	−6	3	
6	India	5	0	1	4	4	9	−5	1	

Source: FIH
Rules for classification: 1) points; 2) goal difference; 3) goals scored; 4) head-to-head result.

10 April 1983
07:30

United States	3–0	Scotland
Anders 27'; Larson-Mason 35'; Morett 53'	Report

Umpires:
Raisa Filimanova (URS)
Corinne Pritchard (NZL)

10 April 1983
09:00

Australia	5–1	Wales
	Report

Umpires:
Eva Cambal (AUT)
Margaret Lanning (CAN)

10 April 1983
15:45

Netherlands	2–1	India
Le Poole 15'; Boekhorst 21'	Report	Chaudhary 8'

Umpires:
Barbel Aichinger (FRG)
Angela Lario (ESP)

11 April 1983
15:00

Wales	1–1	United States
Pugh 6'	Report	Anders 20'

Umpires:
E Farke (FRG)
Ruth Tong-Trachsler (SUI)

11 April 1983
17:00

Scotland	0–0	Netherlands
	Report

Umpires:
J Adams (AUS)
Eva Cambal (AUT)

12 April 1983
07:30

India	2–3	Australia
Albuquerque 21', 30'	Report	Watkins 35'; Clement 66'; Leggatt 70'

Umpires:
L Lawton (FRA)
E Farke (FRG)

13 April 1983
07:30

Netherlands	1–0	United States
Boekhorst 51'	Report

Umpires:
Barbel Aichinger (FRG)
Corinne Pritchard (NZL)

13 April 1983
15:00

Wales	1–1	India
Morgan 25'	Report	Chaudhary 12'

Umpires:
Mary Harris (ENG)
Ruth Tong-Trachsler (SUI)

13 April 1983
17:00

Australia	1–1	Scotland
Pisani 58'	Report	Young 9'

Umpires:
M Chappell (NZL)
Angela Lario (ESP)

14 April 1983
17:00

Scotland	1–1	Wales
Dobie 49'	Report	Manley 50'

Umpires:
E Farke (FRG)
Raisa Filimanova (URS)

15 April 1983
07:30

India	0–1	United States
	Report	Larson-Mason 58'

Umpires:
Barbel Aichinger (FRG)
M Chappell (NZL)

15 April 1983
21:00

Netherlands	1–0	Australia
Boekhorst 57'	Report

Umpires:
E Farke (FRG)
Margaret Lanning (CAN)

16 April 1983
09:30

Scotland	2–0	India
Craigie 58'; Macara 66'	Report

Umpires:
E Farke (FRG)
Ruth Tong-Trachsler (SUI)

16 April 1983
15:00

Australia	1–1	United States
Clement 51'	Report	Anders 67'

Umpires:
Mary Harris (ENG)
Barbel Aichinger (FRG)

16 April 1983
17:00

Netherlands	3–1	Wales
Boekhorst 25'; Kaptein 28'; Van Doorn 40'	Report	Poston 19'

Umpires:
Corinne Pritchard (NZL)
Margaret Lanning (CAN)

=== Pool B ===
Pos	Team	Pld	W	D	L	GF	GA	GD	Pts	Qualification
1	Canada	5	3	1	1	10	4	+6	7	Semi-finals
2	West Germany	5	3	0	2	8	5	+3	6	Semi-finals
3	England	5	2	2	1	10	9	+1	6	
4	New Zealand	5	1	2	2	5	6	−1	4	
5	Argentina	5	1	2	2	2	4	−2	4	
6	Soviet Union	5	1	1	3	3	10	−7	3	

Source: FIH
Rules for classification: 1) points; 2) goal difference; 3) goals scored; 4) head-to-head result.

10 April 1983
17:15

West Germany	0–1	Argentina
	Report	Alfonso 16'

Umpires:
Heather Scraggs (AUS)
F Molinari-Westerbring (SUI)

11 April 1983
07:30

England	1–1	Canada
Swinnerton-Ions 61'	Report	Winter 34'

Umpires:
M Barr (SCO)
L Sherrill (USA)

11 April 1983
09:30

New Zealand	1–1	Soviet Union
Monk 12'	Report	Buzunova 68'

Umpires:
Pat Hayes (USA)
Brigitte de Vries-Scheeren (NED)

12 April 1983
09:30

Argentina	1–1	England
Carello 23'	Report	Hine 42'

Umpires:
J Adams (AUS)
F Molinari-Westerbring (SUI)

12 April 1983
15:00

Soviet Union	0–2	West Germany
	Report	Schley 42'; Hahn 49'

Umpires:
M Barr (SCO)
Loekie Roeg-Rogge (NED)

12 April 1983
17:00

Canada	1–2	New Zealand
Forshaw 18'	Report	Monk 6', 66'

Umpires:
Jean Field (RSA)
Heather Scraggs (AUS)

14 April 1983
07:30

West Germany	1–2	Canada
Koch 59'	Report	Beecroft 31'; Gourlay 70'

Umpires:
F Molinari-Westerbring (SUI)
L Sherrill (USA)

14 April 1983
09:30

Argentina	0–1	Soviet Union
	Report	Krasnikova 18'

Umpires:
Jean Robertson (SCO)
Heather Scraggs (AUS)

14 April 1983
15:00

England	3–2	New Zealand
Swinnerton-Ions 43'; Carr 50'; Hine 59'	Report	Haig 52', 69'

Umpires:
Pat Hayes (USA)
Loekie Roeg-Rogge (NED)

15 April 1983
15:00

Argentina	0–2	Canada
	Report	Stoyka 40', 60'

Umpires:
M Barr (SCO)
Brigitte de Vries-Scheeren (NED)

15 April 1983
17:00

West Germany	1–0	New Zealand
Ott 5'	Report

Umpires:
J Adams (AUS)
Angela Lario (ESP)

16 April 1983
07:30

Soviet Union	1–3	England
Krasnikova 42'	Report	Hine 40'; Swinnerton-Ions 47'; Carr 69'

Umpires:
M Barr (SCO)
Eva Cambal (AUT)

17 April 1983
07:30

Argentina	0–0	New Zealand
	Report

Umpires:
Brigitte de Vries-Scheeren (NED)
Heather Scraggs (AUS)

17 April 1983
15:00

West Germany	4–2	England
Ott 25', 37'; Appel 31'; Koch 38'	Report	Swinnerton-Ions 34'; Gordon 40'

Umpires:
F Molinari-Westerbring (SUI)
L Lawton (FRA)

17 April 1983
17:00

Canada	4–0	Soviet Union
Stoyka 11', 47'; Forshaw 44'; Lambert 61'	Report

Umpires:
M Glover (WAL)
Loekie Roeg-Rogge (NED)

=== Ninth to twelfth place classification ===
==== Crossover ====
19 April 1983
07:30

Wales	0–3	Soviet Union
	Report	Krasnikova 22', 41'; Buzunova 34'

Umpires:
Pat Hayes (USA)
E Farke (FRG)

19 April 1983
09:30

India	0–1	Argentina
	Report	Alfonso 22'

Umpires:
Loekie Roeg-Rogge (NED)
Jean Robertson (SCO)

==== Eleventh and twelfth place ====
21 April 1983
07:30

Wales	0–2	India
	Report	Madraswalla 20'; Chaudhary 28'

Umpires:
Angeline Ee (SIN)
Mary Harris (ENG)

==== Ninth and tenth place ====
22 April 1983
07:30

Soviet Union	2–3	Argentina
Khajdarova 57'; Buzunova 60'	Report	Carello 29'; Alfonso 34'; Colombo 39'

Umpires:
L Sherrill (USA)
F Molinari-Westerbring (SUI)

=== Fifth to eighth place classification ===
==== Crossover ====
19 April 1983
15:00

United States	2–1	New Zealand
Anders 12', 69'	Report	Clinton 31'

Umpires:
J Adams (AUS)
Brigitte de Vries-Scheeren (NED)

19 April 1983
17:00

Scotland	1–5	England
Macvicar 25'	Report	Swinnerton-Ions 1', 21', 22', 36'; Souyave 36'

Umpires:
Barbel Aichinger (FRG)
Raisa Filimanova (URS)

==== Seventh and eighth place ====
22 April 1983
15:00

New Zealand	4–0	Scotland
Monk 6'; Kohere 14', 20', 46'	Report

Umpires:
J Adams (AUS)
Loekie Roeg-Rogge (NED)

==== Fifth and sixth place ====
22 April 1983
10:00

United States	1–4 (a.e.t.)	England
Anders 8'	Report	Lister 70'; Souyave 71'; Swinnerton-Ions 76'; Sykes 77'

Umpires:
E Farke (FRG)
Corinne Pritchard (NZL)

=== First to fourth place classification ===
Semi-finals
20 April
Netherlands	2
West Germany	0
20 April
Australia	0 (5)
Canada	0 (8)

Final
23 April
Netherlands	4
Canada	2
Third place
22 April
West Germany	1
Australia	3

==== Semi-finals ====
20 April 1983
15:00

Netherlands	2–0	West Germany
Boekhorst 16'; Le Poole 25'	Report

Umpires:
M Barr (SCO)
Corinne Pritchard (NZL)

20 April 1983
17:00

Australia	0–0 (a.e.t.)	Canada
	Report
Penalties
	5–8

Umpires:
Angela Lario (ESP)
Ruth Tong-Trachsler (SUI)

==== Third and fourth place ====
22 April 1983
17:00

West Germany	1–3	Australia
Koch 36'	Report	Clement 1', 2'; Sunderland 36'

Umpires:
Margaret Lanning (CAN)
Brigitte de Vries-Scheeren (NED)

==== Final ====
23 April 1983
16:00

Netherlands	4–2	Canada
Le Poole 25'; Eijsvogel 48', 49', 50'	Report	Forshaw 26'; Creelman 46'

Umpires:
M Barr (SCO)
Ruth Tong-Trachsler (SUI)

== Final standings ==
1. Netherlands
2. Canada
3. Australia
4. West Germany
5. England
6. United States
7. New Zealand
8. Scotland
9. Argentina
10. Soviet Union
11. India
12. Wales
