= Australia at the 1984 Summer Olympics =

- IOC code: AUS
- NOC: Australian Olympic Federation

in Los Angeles
- Competitors: 242 (169 men, 73 women) in 22 sports
- Flag bearers: Wayne Roycroft (opening); Dean Lukin (closing)
- Medals Ranked 14th: Gold 4 Silver 8 Bronze 12 Total 24

Summer Olympics appearances (overview)
- 1896; 1900; 1904; 1908; 1912; 1920; 1924; 1928; 1932; 1936; 1948; 1952; 1956; 1960; 1964; 1968; 1972; 1976; 1980; 1984; 1988; 1992; 1996; 2000; 2004; 2008; 2012; 2016; 2020; 2024

Other related appearances
- 1906 Intercalated Games –––– Australasia (1908–1912)

Australia competed at the 1984 Summer Olympics in Los Angeles, United States. Australian athletes have competed in every Summer Olympic Games. 242 competitors, 169 men and 73 women, took part in 137 events in 22 sports.

== Medalists ==
Medal	Name	Sport	Event	Date
Gold	Michael Grenda; Kevin Nichols; Michael Turtur; Dean Woods	Cycling	Men's team pursuit	3 August
Gold	Jon Sieben	Swimming	Men's 200 metre butterfly	3 August
Gold	Glynis Nunn	Athletics	Women's heptathlon	4 August
Gold	Dean Lukin	Weightlifting	Men's +110 kg	8 August
Silver	Suzie Landells	Swimming	Women's 400 metre individual medley	29 July
Silver	Mark Stockwell	Swimming	Men's 100 metre freestyle	31 July
Silver	Glenn Beringen	Swimming	Men's 200 metre breaststroke	2 August
Silver	Neil Brooks; Michael Delany; Greg Fasala; Mark Stockwell	Swimming	Men's 4 × 100 metre freestyle relay	2 August
Silver	Karen Phillips	Swimming	Women's 200 metre butterfly	4 August
Silver	Robert Kabbas	Weightlifting	Men's 82.5 kg	4 August
Silver	Gary Gullock; Timothy McLaren; Tony Lovrich; Paul Reedy	Rowing	Men's quadruple sculls	5 August
Silver	Gary Honey	Athletics	Men's long jump	6 August
Bronze	Patricia Dench	Shooting	Women's 25 metre pistol	29 July
Bronze	Peter Evans	Swimming	Men's 100 metre breaststroke	29 July
Bronze	Glenn Buchanan	Swimming	Men's 100 metre butterfly	30 July
Bronze	Rob Woodhouse	Swimming	Men's 400 metre individual medley	30 July
Bronze	Justin Lemberg	Swimming	Men's 400 metre freestyle	2 August
Bronze	Michele Pearson	Swimming	Women's 200 metre individual medley	3 August
Bronze	Gael Martin	Athletics	Women's shot put	3 August
Bronze	Karen Brancourt; Sue Chapman; Margot Foster; Robyn Grey-Gardner; Susan Lee	Rowing	Women's coxed four	4 August
Bronze	Glenn Buchanan; Peter Evans; Mark Kerry; Mark Stockwell	Swimming	Men's 4 × 100 metre medley relay	4 August
Bronze	James Battersby; Ian Edmunds; Steve Evans; Clyde Hefer; Craig Muller; Sam Patten; Ion Popa; Gavin Thredgold; Tim Willoughby	Rowing	Men's eight	5 August
Bronze	Scott Anderson; Christopher Cairns	Sailing	Tornado	8 August
Bronze	Barry Kelly; Grant Kenny	Canoeing	Men's K-2 1000 metres	11 August

== Archery ==
In the fourth Olympic archery competition that Australia contested, the nation sent one woman and one man. Two-time veteran Terene Donovan improved her score from four years earlier by 99 points even as she fell ten places in the ranking.

Women's Individual Competition

- Terene Donovan — 2442 points (→ 19th place)

Men's Individual Competition

- Christopher Blake — 2434 points (→ 31st place)

== Athletics ==
Men's 100 metres

- Peter Van Miltenburg
  - Qualifying Heat — 10.55
  - Quarterfinals — 10.52 (→ did not advance)

Men's 200 metres

- Peter Van Miltenburg
  - Qualifying Heat — 21.06
  - Quarterfinals — 21.09 (→ did not advance)

Men's 400 metres

- Darren Clark
  - Heat — 45.68
  - Quarterfinals — 44.77
  - Semifinals — 45.26
  - Final — 44.75 (→ 4th place)
- Bruce Frayne
  - Heat — 46.08
  - Quarterfinals — 45.35
  - Semifinals — 45.21 (→ did not advance)
- Gary Minihan
  - Heat — 46.93 (→ did not advance)

Men's Marathon

- Robert de Castella — 2:11:09 (→ 5th place)

Men's Long Jump

- Gary Honey
  - Qualification — 7.93m
  - Final — 8.24m (→ Silver Medal)

Men's High Jump

- John Atkinson
  - Qualification — 2.21m (→ did not advance)

Men's Decathlon

- Peter Hadfield
  - Final result — 7683 points (→ 14th place)

Men's 20 km Walk

- David Smith
  - Final — 1:26:48 (→ 10th place)
- Simon Baker
  - Final — 1:27:43 (→ 14th place)
- Willi Sawall
  - Final — 1:28:24 (→ 16th place)

Men's 50 km Walk

- Michael Harvey
  - Final — 4:09:18 (→ 11th place)
- Andrew Jachno
  - Final — DNF (→ no ranking)
- Willi Sawall
  - Final — DNF (→ no ranking)

Women's 3,000 metres

- Donna Gould
  - Heat — 9.05.56 (→ did not advance)

Women's Marathon

- Lisa Martin
  - Final — 2:29.03 (→ 7th place)

Women's 400m Hurdles

- Debbie Flintoff-King
  - Heat — 57.20
  - Semifinal — 56.24
  - Final — 56.21 (→ 6th place)

Women's Long Jump

- Robyn Lorraway
  - Qualification — 6.61 m
  - Final — 6.67 m (→ 6th place)
- Glynis Nunn
  - Qualification — 6.41 m
  - Final — 6.53 m (→ 7th place)
- Linda Garden
  - Qualification — 6.49 m
  - Final — 6.30 m (→ 11th place)

Women's High Jump

- Vanessa Browne
  - Qualification — 1.90m
  - Final — 1.94m (→ 6th place)
- Christine Stanton
  - Qualification — 1.90m
  - Final — 1.85m (→ 11th place)

Women's Discus Throw

- Gael Martin
  - Qualification — 55.38m
  - Final — 55.88m (→ 8th place)

Women's Javelin Throw

- Petra Rivers
  - Qualification — 59.12m
  - Final — 56.20m (→ 12th place)

Women's Shot Put

- Gael Martin
  - Final — 19.19 m (→ Bronze Medal)

Women's Heptathlon

- Glynis Nunn
  - Final result — 6390 points (→ Gold Medal)

== Basketball ==
Men's team competition

- Preliminary round (Group A)
  - Defeated Brazil (76–72)
  - Lost to Yugoslavia (64–94)
  - Defeated West-Germany (67–66)
  - Lost to Italy (82–93)
  - Defeated Egypt (94–78)
- Quarterfinals
  - Lost to Spain (93–101)
- Classification Matches
  - 5th/8th place: Lost to Uruguay (95–101)
  - 7th/8th place: Defeated West-Germany (83–76) → Seventh place
- Team Roster
  - Phil Smyth (captain)
  - Andrew Campbell
  - Damian Keogh
  - Larry Sengstock
  - Mark Dalton
  - Wayne Carroll
  - Mel Dalgleish
  - Andrew Gaze
  - Ian Davies
  - Danny Morseau
  - Brad Dalton
  - Ray Borner
- Head coach: Lindsay Gaze

Women's team competition

- Preliminary round
  - Lost to PR China (64–67)
  - Lost to United States (47–81)
  - Lost to Canada (45–56)
  - Lost to South Korea (48–54)
  - Defeated Yugoslavia (62–59) → Fifth place
- Team Roster
  - Robyn Maher
  - Bronwyn Marshall
  - Jenny Cheesman (captain)
  - Patricia Cockrem
  - Donna Quinn
  - Patricia Mickan
  - Julie Nykiel
  - Kathryn Foster
  - Marina Moffa
  - Karen Dalton
  - Wendy Laidlaw
  - Sue Geh

Head Coach: Brendan Flynn

== Boxing ==
Men's Flyweight (– 51 kg)

- Jeff Fenech
  1. First round — Defeated René Centellas (BOL), RSC-3
  2. Second round — Defeated David Mwaba (TNZ), 5:0
  3. Quarterfinals — Lost to Redzep Redzepovski (YUG), 1:4

== Cycling ==
Twelve cyclists represented Australia in 1984, winning gold in the team pursuit.

Individual road race

- Jeff Leslie – +22:20 (→ 50th place)
- Michael Lynch – +27:05 (→ 55th place)
- Gary Trowell – did not finish (→ no ranking)
- John Watters – did not finish (→ no ranking)

Team time trial

- Jeff Leslie
- Michael Lynch
- Gary Trowell
- John Watters

Sprint

- Kenrick Tucker
- Max Rainsford

1000m time trial

- Max Rainsford

Individual pursuit

- Dean Woods
- Michael Grenda

Team pursuit

- Michael Grenda
- Kevin Nichols
- Michael Turtur
- Dean Woods

Points race

- Glenn Clarke
- Gary West

== Diving ==
Men's 3m Springboard

- Steve Foley
  - Preliminary round — 543.87
  - Final — 561.93 (→ 8th place)

== Fencing ==
Three fencers, one man and two women, represented Australia in 1984.

Men's foil

- Greg Benko

Women's foil

- Helen Smith
- Andrea Chaplin

== Field hockey ==
Men's team competition

- Preliminary round (Group A)
  - Australia — Malaysia 5–0
  - Australia — Spain 3–1
  - Australia — West Germany 3–0
  - Australia — India 4–2
  - Australia — USA 2–1
- Semi-finals
  - Australia — Pakistan 0–1
- Bronze Medal Game
  - Australia — Great Britain 2–3 (→ Fourth Place)
- Team Roster
  - Ric Charlesworth
  - David Bell
  - Jim Irvine
  - Terry Walsh
  - Trevor Smith
  - Grant Boyce
  - Nigel Patmore
  - Neil Snowden
  - Treva King
  - Grant Mitton
  - Peter Haselhurst
  - Adrian Berce
  - Craig Davies
  - Colin Batch
  - Michael Nobbs
  - Terry Leece

Women's team competition

- Round Robin
  - Australia — West Germany 2–2
  - Australia — New Zealand 3–0
  - Australia — Canada 1–2
  - Australia — USA 3–1
  - Australia — Netherlands 0–2
  - Australia eventually finished fourth, after a loss in the penalty shoot-out against home nation the United States.
- Team Roster
  - Marian Bell
  - Evelyn Botfield
  - Sharon Buchanan
  - Loretta Dorman
  - Pamela Glossop
  - Penny Gray
  - Tricia Heberle
  - Lorraine Hillas
  - Robyn Holmes
  - Kym Ireland
  - Robyn Fernley (captain)
  - Colleen Pearce
  - Sandra Pisani
  - Julene Sunderland
  - Liane Tooth
  - Susan Watkins
- Head Coach: Brian Glencross

== Modern pentathlon ==
Three male pentathletes represented Australia in 1984.

Individual

- Alex Watson
- Matthew Spies
- Daniel Esposito

Team

- Alex Watson
- Matthew Spies
- Daniel Esposito

== Swimming ==
Men's Competition

Men's 100 m Freestyle

- Michael Delany
  - Qualifying heat 4 – 51.22 (1st)
  - Final b – DNS
- Mark Stockwell
  - Qualifying heat 6 – 50.27 (1st)
  - Final – 50.24 (→ Silver Medal)

Men's 200 m Freestyle

- Peter Dale
  - Qualifying heat 1 – 1:51.42 (1st)
  - Final – 1:53.84 (8th)
- Justin Lemberg
  - Qualifying heat 5 – 1:52.73 (4th, did not advance)

Men's 400 m Freestyle

- Justin Lemberg
  - Qualifying heat 2 – 3:53.89 (1st)
  - Final – 3:51.79 (→ Bronze Medal)
- Ron McKeon
  - Qualifying heat 4 – 3:55.06 (4th)
  - Final – 3:55.48 (8th)

Men's 1.500 m Freestyle

- Justin Lemberg
  - Qualifying heat 1 – 15:29.74 (1st, did not advance)
- Wayne Shillington
  - Qualifying heat 3 – 15:25.67 (3rd)
  - Final – 15:38.18 (8th)

Men's 100 m Butterfly

- Glenn Buchanan
  - Qualifying heat 1 – 54.86 (1st)
  - Final – 53.85 (→ Bronze Medal)
- Mark Stockwell
  - Qualifying heat 7 – 55.70 (3rd)
  - Final b – DNS

Men's 200 m Butterfly

- Jon Sieben
  - Qualifying heat 4 – 1:58.63 (2nd)
  - Final – 1:57.04 (→ Gold Medal)

Men's 100 m Breaststroke

- Peter Evans
  - Qualifying heat 2 – 1:02.87 (1st)
  - Final – 1:02.97 (→ Bronze Medal)
- Brett Stocks
  - Qualifying heat 5 – 1:03.46 (1st)
  - Final – 1:03.49 (6th)

Men's 200 m Breaststroke

- Glenn Beringen
  - Qualifying heat 6 – 2:17.29 (1st)
  - Final – 2:15.79 (→ Silver Medal)
- Peter Evans
  - Qualifying heat 1 – 2:21.21 (2nd)
  - Final b – DNS

Men's 100 m Backstroke

- Mark Kerry
  - Qualifying heat 2 – 57.15 (1st)
  - Final – 57.18 (5th)
- David Orbell
  - Qualifying heat 1 – 58.35 (1st)
  - Final b – 58.05 (1st)

Men's 200 m Backstroke

- David Orbell
  - Qualifying heat 3 – 2:04.00 (1st)
  - Final – 2:04.61 (8th)
- Kim Terrell
  - Qualifying heat 5 – 2:06.56 (3rd, did not advance)

Men's 200 m Individual Medley

- Rob Woodhouse
  - Qualifying heat 1 – 2:06.45 (2nd)
  - Final b – 2:04.85 (1st)
- Glenn Beringen
  - Qualifying heat 2 – 2:08.85 (4th, did not advance)

Men's 400 m Individual Medley

- Rob Woodhouse
  - Qualifying heat 3 – 4:24.85 (3rd)
  - Final – 4:20.50 (→ Bronze Medal)

Men's 4 × 100 m Freestyle Relay

- Neil Brooks, Michael Delany, Greg Fasala, and Mark Stockwell
  - Qualifying heat 3 – 3:19.94 (1st)
  - Final – 3:19.68 (→ Silver Medal)

Men's 4 × 200 m Freestyle Relay

- Graeme Brewer, Peter Dale, Justin Lemberg, and Ron McKeon
  - Qualifying heat 2 – 7:26.93 (2nd)
  - Final – 7:25.63 (4th)

Men's 4 × 100 m Medley Relay

- Thomas Stachewicz, Glenn Buchanan, Peter Evans, Mark Kerry, and Mark Stockwell
  - Qualifying heat 3 – 3:43.93 (1st)
  - Final – 3.43.25 (→ Bronze Medal)

Women's Competition

Women's 50 m Freestyle

- Lisa Curry
  - Qualifying heat 6 – 26.07 (11th)
  - Final b – 25.87 (1st)

Women's 100 m Freestyle

- Susie Ford
  - Qualifying heat 4 – 57.76 (1st, did not advance)
- Angela Harris
  - Qualifying heat 6 – 57.30 (2nd)
  - Final – 58.09 (8th)
- Michelle Pearson
  - Qualifying heat 4 – 56.75 (1st)
  - Final – 56.83 (5th)

Women's 200 m Freestyle

- Michelle Pearson
  - Qualifying heat 3 – 2:01.49 (2nd)
  - Final – 1:59.79 (4th)
- Susie Ford
  - Qualifying heat 4 – 2:04.82 (8th, did not advance)
- Anna McVann
  - Qualifying heat 3 – 2:03.14 (3rd)
  - Final – 2:02.87 (8th)

Women's 400 m Freestyle

- Susie Ford
  - Qualifying heat 3 – 4:20.68 (4th)
  - Final b – 4:15.46 (1st)
- Anna McVann
  - Qualifying heat 3 – 4:15.21 (2nd)
  - Final – 4:13.95 (5th)

Women's 800 m Freestyle

- Susie Ford
  - Qualifying heat 3 – 8:56.40 (6th, did not advance)
- Anna McVann
  - Qualifying heat 2 – 8:35.19 (2nd)
  - Final – 8:37.94 (4th)

Women's 100 m Butterfly

- Janet Blood
  - Qualifying heat 4 – 1:01.97 (2nd)
  - Final – 1:01.78 (5th)
- Lisa Curry
  - Qualifying 7 – 1:01.07 (9th)
  - Final b – 1:01.61 (5th)

Women's 200 m Butterfly

- Karen Higgison
  - Qualifying heat 3 – 2:11.81 (1st)
  - Final – 2:10.56 (→ Silver Medal)
- Janet Blood
  - Qualifying heat 2 – 2:13.74 (2nd)
  - Swim-off with Conny van Bentum (NED) – 2:15.54 (2nd)
  - Final b – DNS

Women's 100 m Breaststroke

- Dimity Douglas
  - Qualifying heat 2 – 1:12.18 (3rd)
  - Final b – 1:12:00 (3rd)
- Sharon Kellett
  - Qualifying heat 3 – 1:13.43 (4th, did not advance)

Women's 200 m Breaststroke

- Dimity Douglas
  - Qualifying heat 3 – 2:36.47 (5th)
  - Final b – 2:39.33 (8th)
- Sharon Kellett
  - Qualifying heat 2 – 2:33.23 (1st)
  - Final – 2:33.80 (5th)

Women's 100 m Backstroke

- Georgina Parkes
  - Qualifying heat 3 – 1:04.90 (2nd)
  - Final b – 1:04.52 (2nd)
- Audrey Youl
  - Qualifying heat 1 – 1:04.94 (3rd)
  - Final b – 1:04.15 (1st)

Women's 200 m Backstroke

- Georgina Parkes
  - Qualifying heat 1 – 2:18.49 (1st)
  - Final – 2:14.87 (4th)
- Audrey Youl
  - Qualifying heat 3 – 2:20.12 (4th)
  - Final b – 2:21.36 (8th)

Women's 200 m Individual Medley

- Michelle Pearson
  - Qualifying heat 3 – 2:17.46 (2nd)
  - Final – 2:15.92 (→ Bronze Medal)

Women's 400 m Individual Medley

- Suzanne Dill-Macky
  - Qualifying heat 3 – 4:54.13 (2nd)
  - Final – 4:44.30 (→ Silver Medal)
- Karen Higgison
  - Qualifying heat 3 – 5:54.28 (4th)
  - Final b – 4:53.37 (11th)

Women's 4 × 100 m Freestyle Relay

- Lisa Curry, Angela Harris, Janet Blood, Michelle Pearson
  - Qualifying heat 1 – 3:49.61 (2nd)
- Michelle Pearson, Angela Harris, Anna McVann, Lisa Curry
  - Final – 3:47.79 (4th)

Women's 4 × 100 m Medley Relay

- Audrey Youl, Dimity Douglas, Lisa Curry, and Angela Harris
  - Qualifying heat 2 – DSQ

== Water polo ==
Men's team competition

- Preliminary round (Group C)
  - Lost to West Germany (6–10)
  - Drew with Italy (8–8)
  - Defeated Japan (15–2)
- Final Round (Group D)
  - Lost to Yugoslavia (6–9)
  - Lost to United States (7–12)
  - Defeated Netherlands (8–7)
  - Drew with Spain (10–10) → 5th place
- Team Roster
  - Michael Turner
  - Richard Pengelley
  - Robert Bryant
  - Peter Montgomery
  - Russell Sherwell
  - Andrew Kerr
  - Raymond Mayers
  - Charles Turner
  - Martin Callaghan
  - Christopher Wybrow
  - Russell Basser
  - Julian Muspratt
  - Glenn Townsend
- Head coach: Tom Hoad

== See also ==
- Australia at the 1982 Commonwealth Games
- Australia at the 1986 Commonwealth Games
