= Field hockey at the 1984 Summer Olympics – Women's tournament =

Women's field hockey at the 1984 Summer Olympics

Tournament details
- Host country: United States
- City: Los Angeles
- Dates: 31 July – 10 August
- Teams: 6 (from 3 confederations)
- Venue: Weingart Stadium

Final positions
- Champions: Netherlands (1st title)
- Runner-up: West Germany
- Third place: United States

Tournament statistics
- Matches played: 15
- Goals scored: 52 (3.47 per match)
- Top scorer: (United States) Beth Anders (8 goals)

The women's field hockey tournament at the 1984 Summer Olympics was the 2nd edition of the field hockey event for women at the Summer Olympic Games. It was held from July 31 – August 10, 1984.

Six teams competed in a single round-robin tournament. The Netherlands won the tournament, finishing top of the pool at the culmination of the tournament, West Germany won the silver medal finishing second. The United States and Australia played out a penalty shoot-out for the bronze medal after finishing equal on points and goal difference in the round robin stage, which the United States won 10–5.

== Participating nations ==
- Australia
- Canada
- West Germany
- Netherlands
- New Zealand
- United States

== Results ==
=== Standings ===
Pos	Team	Pld	W	D	L	GF	GA	GD	Pts
1st place, gold medalist(s)	Netherlands	5	4	1	0	14	6	+8	9
2nd place, silver medalist(s)	West Germany	5	2	2	1	9	9	0	6
3rd place, bronze medalist(s)	United States (H)	5	2	1	2	9	7	+2	5
4	Australia	5	2	1	2	9	7	+2	5
5	Canada	5	2	1	2	9	11	−2	5
6	New Zealand	5	0	0	5	2	12	−10	0

Source: FIH
(H) Hosts

=== Fixtures ===
31 July 1984
14:30

New Zealand	1–2	Netherlands
McDonald 47'	Report	Von Weiler 9'; Boekhorst 66'

Umpires:
Jan Adams (AUS)
Mary Barr (GBR)

1 August 1984
09:45

West Germany	2–2	Australia
Koch 22'; Lingnau 25'	Report	Buchanan-Patmore 42'; Pisani 69'

Umpires:
Ruth Tong-Trachsler (SUI)
Brigitte de Vries-Scheeren (NED)

1 August 1984
17:15

United States	4–1	Canada
Anders 7', 18', 64'; Beglin 49'	Report	Stoyka 55'

Umpires:
Bärbel Aichinger (FRG)
Loekie Roeg-Rogge (NED)

2 August 1984
14:30

Australia	3–0	New Zealand
Buchanan-Patmore 4'; Heberle 7'; Sunderland 57'	Report

Umpires:
Margaret Lanning (CAN)
F. Westerbring (SUI)

3 August 1984
08:00

Netherlands	2–1	United States
Boekhorst 7'; Van Doorn 65'	Report	Anders 55'

Umpires:
Ruth Tong-Trachsler (SUI)
Robyn Davis (AUS)

3 August 1984
17:15

Canada	0–3	West Germany
	Report	Lingnau 7'; Appel 45'; Moser 56'

Umpires:
Christiane Asselman (BEL)
F. Westerbring (SUI)

4 August 1984
16:15

New Zealand	0–2	United States
	Report	Anders 23', 42'

Umpires:
Margaret Lanning (CAN)
Jan Adams (AUS)

5 August 1984
09:45

West Germany	2–6	Netherlands
Koch 5', 18'	Report	Eijsvogel 3'; Boekhorst 15', 24'; Van Doorn 45'; Von Weiler 64', 67'

Umpires:
Robyn Davis (AUS)
Christiane Asselman (BEL)

5 August 1984
17:15

Australia	1–2	Canada
Watkins 25'	Report	Branchaud 10'; Forshaw 54'

Umpires:
Mary Barr (GBR)
Bärbel Aichinger (FRG)

6 August 1984
16:45

West Germany	1–0	New Zealand
Ott 39'	Report

Umpires:
Margaret Lanning (CAN)
Brigitte de Vries-Scheeren (NED)

7 August 1984
09:45

Netherlands	2–2	Canada
Von Weiler 15'; Willemse 65'	Report	Stoyka 37'; Forshaw 54'

Umpires:
Christiane Asselman (BEL)
Mary Barr (GBR)

7 August 1984
13:45

Australia	3–1	United States
Heberle 5', 53'; Sunderland 16'	Report	Anders 14'

Umpires:
Loekie Roeg-Rogge (NED)
Brigitte de Vries-Scheeren (NED)

9 August 1984
13:15

United States	1–1	West Germany
Anders 12'	Report	Hahn 57'

Umpires:
F. Westerbring (SUI)
Jan Adams (AUS)

10 August 1984
09:45

Canada	4–1	New Zealand
Forshaw 1'; Stoyka 19'; Wheatley 21'; Branchaud 68'	Report	Clinton 65'

Umpires:
Bärbel Aichinger (GER)
Loekie Roeg-Rogge (NED)

10 August 1984
16:45

Netherlands	2–0	Australia
Von Weiler 39'; Boekhorst 67'	Report

Umpires:
Christiane Asselman (BEL)
Ruth Tong-Trachsler (SUI)

==== Play–off ====
- As Australia and the United States finished on equal points, a shoot-out was contested to determine third place.

10 August 1984
19:00

Australia	shoot-out	United States
	Report
Penalties
Leggatt (penalty shoot-out missed); Pisani (penalty shoot-out missed); Pearce (penalty shoot-out scored); Buchanan-Patmore (penalty shoot-out scored); Gray (penalty shoot-out missed); Leggatt (penalty shoot-out missed); Pisani (penalty shoot-out scored); Pearce (penalty shoot-out missed); Buchanan-Patmore (penalty shoot-out scored); Gray (penalty shoot-out scored)	5–10	(penalty shoot-out scored) Johnson; (penalty shoot-out scored) Anders; (penalty shoot-out scored) Strong; (penalty shoot-out scored) Larson-Mason; (penalty shoot-out scored) Staver; (penalty shoot-out scored) Johnson; (penalty shoot-out scored) Anders; (penalty shoot-out scored) Strong; (penalty shoot-out scored) Larson-Mason; (penalty shoot-out scored) Staver

Umpires:
Brigitte de Vries-Scheeren (NED)
Loekie Roeg-Rogge (NED)

== Final standings ==
1. Netherlands
2. West Germany
3. United States
4. Australia
5. Canada
6. New Zealand

== Goalscorers ==
There were 52 goals scored in 15 matches, for an average of 3.47 goals per match.

8 goals

- (United States) Elizabeth Anders

5 goals

- (Netherlands) Fieke Boekhorst
- (Netherlands) Sophie von Weiler

3 goals

- (Australia) Patricia Heberle
- (Canada) Sheila Forshaw
- (Canada) Darlene Stoyka
- (West Germany) Martina Koch

2 goals

- (Australia) Sharon Buchanan-Patmore
- (Australia) Julene Sunderland
- (Canada) Laura Branchaud
- (Netherlands) Marieke van Doorn
- (West Germany) Corinna Lingnau

1 goal

- (Australia) Sandra Pisani
- (Australia) Susan Watkins
- (Canada) Terry Wheatley
- (Netherlands) Marjolein Eijsvogel
- (Netherlands) Laurien Willemse
- (New Zealand) Mary Clinton
- (New Zealand) Jennifer McDonald
- (United States) Elizabeth Beglin
- (West Germany) Gaby Appel
- (West Germany) Birgit Hahn
- (West Germany) Christina Moser
- (West Germany) Patricia Ott
