= 1986 Women's Hockey World Cup =

Tournament details
- Host country: Netherlands
- City: Amstelveen
- Dates: 15–24 August 1986
- Teams: 12
- Venue: Wagener Stadium

Final positions
- Champions: Netherlands (4th title)
- Runner-up: West Germany
- Third place: Canada

Tournament statistics
- Matches played: 42
- Goals scored: 246 (5.86 per match)
- Top scorer(s): (Australia) Elspeth Clement (Soviet Union) Natella Krasnikova (9 goals)

The 1986 Women's Hockey World Cup was the sixth edition of the Women's Hockey World Cup, an international field hockey tournament. It was held from 15 to 24 August 1986 in Amstelveen, Netherlands.

Netherlands won the tournament for the fourth time after defeating West Germany 3–0 in the final.

== Results ==
=== Preliminary round ===
==== Pool A ====
Pos	Team	Pld	W	D	L	GF	GA	GD	Pts	Qualification
1	Netherlands	5	4	0	1	17	7	+10	8	Semi-finals
2	Canada	5	4	0	1	7	4	+3	8	Semi-finals
3	Australia	5	3	1	1	16	6	+10	7	
4	England	5	1	2	2	6	10	−4	4	
5	Scotland	5	1	0	4	5	13	−8	2	
6	Spain	5	0	1	4	5	16	−11	1	

Source: FIH
Rules for classification: 1) points; 2) goal difference; 3) goals scored; 4) head-to-head result.

15 August 1986
15:00

Netherlands	3–2	Scotland
Lejeune 32', 45', 50'	Report	Ramsay 55'; Messenger 61'

Umpires:
Corinne Pritchard (NZL)
L Lawton (FRA)

15 August 1986
17:00

Australia	2–2	England
Clement 5', 70'	Report	Dixon 37'; Bannister 65'

Umpires:
Naomi Kato (JPN)
M Theus (FRG)

15 August 1986
19:00

Spain	1–3	Canada
Muñoz 14'	Report	Forshaw 10'; Charlton 51', 56'

Umpires:
Christianne Asselman (BEL)
Raisa Filimanova (URS)

16 August 1986
15:00

Netherlands	5–1	England
Van Doorn 5'; Von Weiler 25', 38', 62'; Hillen 61'	Report	Dixon 50'

Umpires:
E Farke (GER)
Christianne Asselman (BEL)

16 August 1986
17:00

Australia	2–0	Canada
Clement 12', 27'	Report

Umpires:
L Lawton (FRA)
F Molinari-Westerbring (SUI)

16 August 1986
19:00

Spain	1–3	Scotland
Antem 67'	Report	Ramsay 18'; Fraser 28'; Messenger 61'

Umpires:
M Theus (FRG)
Corinne Pritchard (NZL)

17 August 1986
13:00

Netherlands	3–2	Australia
Lejeune 21'; Von Weiler 42', 44'	Report	Clement 31'; Pereira 68'

Umpires:
Corinne Pritchard (NZL)
F Molinari-Westerbring (SUI)

17 August 1986
15:00

England	2–2	Spain
Parker 57'; Lister 63'	Report	Antem 27'; Dorado 42'

Umpires:
Naomi Kato (JPN)
Christianne Asselman (BEL)

17 August 1986
17:00

Canada	1–0	Scotland
Lyn 56'	Report

Umpires:
Raisa Filimanova (URS)
E Farke (FRG)

19 August 1986
09:00

Australia	3–1	Spain
Grant 11', 56'; Buchanan 54'	Report	Antem 66'

Umpires:
M Theus (FRG)
Raisa Filimanova (URS)

19 August 1986
11:00

England	1–0	Scotland
Dixon 11'	Report

Umpires:
L Lawton (FRA)
F Molinari-Westerbring (SUI)

19 August 1986
13:00

Netherlands	1–2	Canada
Van Doorn 11'	Report	Conn 21', 29'

Umpires:
Naomi Kato (JPN)
E Farke (FRG)

20 August 1986
09:00

Australia	7–0	Scotland
Clement 5', 22', 60'; Bowman 19', 43'; Grant 44'; Pereira 63'	Report

Umpires:
Christianne Asselman (BEL)
L Lawton (FRA)

20 August 1986
11:00

Netherlands	5–0	Spain
Eijsvogel 12', 45'; Lejeune 18', 22'; Van Doorn 53'	Report

Umpires:
F Molinari-Westerbring (SUI)
Naomi Kato (JPN)

20 August 1986
13:00

England	0–1	Canada
	Report	Lyn 64'

Umpires:
M Theus (FRG)
Corinne Pritchard (NZL)

==== Pool B ====
Pos	Team	Pld	W	D	L	GF	GA	GD	Pts	Qualification
1	West Germany	5	1	4	0	7	3	+4	6	Semi-finals
2	New Zealand	5	2	2	1	11	10	+1	6	Semi-finals
3	Argentina	5	1	3	1	5	6	−1	5	
4	Soviet Union	5	2	1	2	10	13	−3	5	
5	United States	5	1	2	2	7	7	0	4	
6	Ireland	5	1	2	2	9	10	−1	4	

Source: FIH
Rules for classification: 1) points; 2) goal difference; 3) goals scored; 4) head-to-head result.

15 August 1986
09:00

West Germany	0–0	Ireland
	Report

Umpires:
Margaret Lanning (CAN)
Angela Lario (ESP)

15 August 1986
11:00

New Zealand	1–1	Argentina
Bell-Kake 47'	Report	Liz 63'

Umpires:
Jean Robertson (SCO)
R Tong (RSA)

15 August 1986
13:00

United States	2–3	Soviet Union
Morgan 25'; Donnelly 65'	Report	Krasnikova 13', 18', 68'

Umpires:
A Poelmans (NED)
Salobrar Hernandez (ESP)

16 August 1986
09:00

West Germany	0–0	Argentina
	Report

Umpires:
A Poelmans (NED)
Jean Robertson (SCO)

16 August 1986
11:00

Ireland	3–3	Soviet Union
Barnwell 5', 7'; Fusco 52'	Report	Kanaporene 1'; Krasnikova 18', 54'

Umpires:
Jolanda Mohlmann (NED)
Margaret Lanning (CAN)

16 August 1986
13:00

New Zealand	2–1	United States
Clinton 13'; Littleworth 47'	Report	Morgan 3'

Umpires:
Brigitte de Vries-Scheeren (NED)
Angela Lario (ESP)

18 August 1986
15:00

Soviet Union	1–2	Argentina
Krasnikova 13'	Report	Liz 23'; Palma 35'

Umpires:
Salobrar Hernandez (ESP)
Brigitte de Vries-Scheeren (NED)

18 August 1986
17:00

Ireland	0–2	United States
	Report	Johnson 33'; Hightower 56'

Umpires:
A Poelmans (NED)
R Tong (RSA)

18 August 1986
19:00

West Germany	2–2	New Zealand
Moser 20'; Schmid 69'	Report	Clinton 35'; Thompson 51'

Umpires:
Jolanda Mohlmann (NED)
Angela Lario (ESP)

19 August 1986
15:00

Ireland	3–1	Argentina
Nagle 38'; Drum 40'; Browne 68'	Report	Palma 35'

Umpires:
Jolanda Mohlmann (NED)
R Tong (RSA)

19 August 1986
17:00

New Zealand	2–3	Soviet Union
Littleworth 41'; Martin 45'	Report	Krasnikova 43', 56'; Kanaporene 70'

Umpires:
Margaret Lanning (CAN)
Jean Robertson (SCO)

19 August 1986
19:00

West Germany	1–1	United States
Schmid 20'	Report	Johnson 49'

Umpires:
Brigitte de Vries-Scheeren (NED)
Salobrar Hernandez (ESP)

20 August 1986
15:00

New Zealand	4–3	Ireland
Arthur 6'; Clinton 13'; Martin 46'; Littleworth 62'	Report	Barnwell 15', 44', 70'

Umpires:
Salobrar Hernandez (ESP)
Margaret Lanning (CAN)

20 August 1986
17:00

United States	1–1	Argentina
Donnelly 70'	Report	Liz 33'

Umpires:
Brigitte de Vries-Scheeren (NED)
Jolanda Mohlmann (NED)

20 August 1986
19:00

West Germany	4–0	Soviet Union
Jungjohann 14'; Appel 43', 45'; Blumenberg 55'	Report

Umpires:
Jean Robertson (SCO)
R Tong (RSA)

=== Ninth to twelfth place classification ===
Crossover
22 August 1986
Scotland	2
Ireland	0
22 August 1986
Spain	0
United States	4

Ninth place
23 August 1986
Scotland	0
United States	2
Eleventh place
23 August 1986
Ireland	1
Spain (a.e.t.)	2

==== Crossover ====
22 August 1986
09:00

Spain	0–4	United States
	Report	Johnson 32', 34', 39'; Hightower 53'

Umpires:
Jolanda Mohlmann (NED)
E Farke (FRG)

22 August 1986
11:00

Scotland	2–0	Ireland
Ramsay 8'; Messenger 68'	Report

Umpires:
M Theus (FRG)
Corinne Pritchard (NZL)

==== Eleventh and twelfth place ====
23 August 1986
11:00

Ireland	1–2 (a.e.t.)	Spain
Barnwell 53'	Report	Atem 41'; Motos 81'

Umpires:
Raisa Filimanova (RUS)
Christianne Asselman (BEL)

==== Ninth and tenth place ====
23 August 1986
13:00

Scotland	0–1	United States
	Report	Morgan 37'

Umpires:
F Molinari-Westerbring (SUI)
A Poelmans (NED)

=== Fifth to eighth place classification ===
Crossover
22 August 1986
Australia	7
Soviet Union	0
22 August 1986
England	2
Argentina	0

Fifth place
23 August 1986
Australia	2
England (a.e.t.)	3
Seventh place
23 August 1986
Argentina (a.e.t.)	3
Soviet Union	2

==== Crossover ====
22 August 1986
13:00

England	2–0	Argentina
Holwell 43'; Parker 68'	Report

Umpires:
Angela Lario (ESP)
Brigitte de Vries-Scheeren (SUI)

22 August 1986
15:00

Australia	7–0	Soviet Union
Capes 6'; Grant 23'; Pereira 38', 46', 49', 67'; Heberle 70'	Report

Umpires:
A Poelmans (NED)
Margaret Lanning (CAN)

==== Seventh and eighth place ====
23 August 1986
15:00

Argentina	3–2 (a.e.t.)	Soviet Union
Liz 63', 66'; Belmonte 97'	Report	Kuznetsova 9'; Krasnikova 54'

Umpires:
Corinne Pritchard (NZL)
Naomi Kato (JPN)

==== Fifth and sixth place ====
23 August 1986
17:00

Australia	2–3 (a.e.t.)	England
Grant 14'; Clement 66'	Report	Parker 32', 51'; Brown 86'

Umpires:
R Tong (RSA)
Salobrar Hernandez (ESP)

=== First to fourth place classification ===
Semi-finals
22 August 1986
Canada	1
West Germany	4
22 August 1986
Netherlands	3
New Zealand	1

Final
24 August 1986
West Germany	0
Netherlands	3
Third place
24 August 1986
Canada (a.e.t.)	3
New Zealand	2

==== Semi-finals ====
22 August 1986
17:00

Canada	1–4	West Germany
Forshaw 33'	Report	Schmid 15', 29', 40'; Appel 54'

Umpires:
R Tong (RSA)
Salobrar Hernandez (ESP)

22 August 1986
19:00

Netherlands	3–1	New Zealand
Lejeune 9'; Von Weiler 16'; Ohr 38'	Report	Clinton 42'

Umpires:
Jean Robertson (SCO)
L Lawton (FRA)

==== Third and fourth place ====
24 August 1986
13:00

Canada	3–2 (a.e.t.)	New Zealand
Conn 58'; Branchaud 67'; Lyn 72'	Report	Furmage 34'; Clinton 63'

Umpires:
Brigitte de Vries-Scheeren (BEL)
L Lawton (FRA)

==== Final ====
24 August 1986
15:00

West Germany	0–3	Netherlands
	Report	Eijsvogel 10'; Lejeune 17'; Le Poole 66'

Umpires:
Jean Robertson (SCO)
Margaret Lanning (CAN)

== Statistics ==
=== Final standings ===
As per statistical convention in field hockey, matches decided in extra time are counted as wins and losses, while matches decided by penalty shoot-outs are counted as draws.

Pos	Grp	Team	Pld	W	D	L	GF	GA	GD	Pts	Final result
1st place, gold medalist(s)	A	Netherlands	7	6	0	1	23	8	+15	12	Gold Medal
2nd place, silver medalist(s)	B	West Germany	7	2	4	1	11	7	+4	8	Silver Medal
3rd place, bronze medalist(s)	A	Canada	7	5	0	2	11	10	+1	10	Bronze Medal
4	B	New Zealand	7	2	2	3	14	16	−2	6	Fourth place
5	A	England	7	3	2	2	11	12	−1	8	Eliminated in group stage
6	A	Australia	7	4	1	2	25	9	+16	9	Eliminated in group stage
7	B	Argentina	7	2	3	2	8	10	−2	7	Eliminated in group stage
8	B	Soviet Union	7	2	1	4	12	23	−11	5	Eliminated in group stage
9	B	United States	7	3	2	2	12	7	+5	8	Eliminated in group stage
10	A	Scotland	7	2	0	5	7	14	−7	4	Eliminated in group stage
11	A	Spain	7	1	1	5	7	21	−14	3	Eliminated in group stage
12	B	Ireland	7	1	2	4	10	14	−4	4	Eliminated in group stage

Source: FIH

=== Goalscorers ===
There were 151 goals scored in 42 matches, for an average of 3.6 goals per match.

9 goals

- (Australia) Elspeth Clement
- (Soviet Union) Natella Krasnikova

8 goals

- (Netherlands) Lisanne Lejeune

6 goals

- (Australia) Jacqueline Pereira
- (Ireland) Mary Barnwell
- (Netherlands) Sophie von Weiler

5 goals

- (Argentina) Gabriela Liz
- (Australia) Julene Grant
- (New Zealand) Mary Clinton
- (United States) Sheryl Johnson
- (Germany) Susanne Schmid

4 goals

- (England) Kate Parker
- (Spain) Silvia Antem

3 goals

- (Canada) Michelle Conn
- (Canada) Lisa Lyn
- (England) Victoria Dixon
- (Netherlands) Marieke van Doorn
- (Netherlands) Marjolein Eijsvogel
- (New Zealand) Helen Littleworth
- (Scotland) Gillian Messenger
- (Scotland) Alison Ramsay
- (United States) Christine Morgan
- (Germany) Gabriele Appel

2 goals

- (Argentina) Alejandra Palma
- (Australia) Deborah Bowman
- (Canada) Nancy Charlton
- (Canada) Sheila Forshaw
- (New Zealand) Janet Martin
- (Soviet Union) Ona Kanaporene
- (United States) Megan Donnelly
- (United States) Yolanda Hightower

1 goal

- (Argentina) Griselda Belmonte
- (Australia) Sharon Buchanan
- (Australia) Lee Capes
- (Australia) Patricia Heberle
- (Canada) Laura Branchaud
- (England) Julie Bannister
- (England) Karen Brown
- (England) Susan Holwell
- (England) Sandra Lister
- (Ireland) Margaret Browne
- (Ireland) Sandra Drum
- (Ireland) Caroline Fusco
- (Ireland) Rose Nagle
- (Netherlands) Elsemieke Hillen
- (Netherlands) Martine Ohr
- (Netherlands) Sandra Le Poole
- (New Zealand) Christine Arthur
- (New Zealand) Tina Bell-Kake
- (New Zealand) Susan Furmage
- (New Zealand) Catherine Thompson
- (Scotland) Wendy Fraser
- (Soviet Union) Tatiana Kuznetsova
- (Spain) Natalia Dorado
- (Spain) Teresa Motos
- (Spain) Mónica Muñoz
- (Germany) Bettina Blumenberg
- (Germany) Caren Jungjohann
- (Germany) Christina Moser
