= Canada women's national field hockey team =

Women's national field hockey team representing Canada

Canada
- Association: PAHF (Americas)
- Confederation: Field Hockey Canada
- Head Coach: Rob Short
- Assistant coach(es): Soledad García; Fergus Kavanagh
- Manager: Kelly Vanry
- Captain: Natalie Sourisseau
- Most caps: Katherine Wright
Home	Away

FIH ranking
- Current: 26 (25 July 2026)

Olympic Games
- Appearances: 3 (first in 1984)
- Best result: 5th (1984)

World Cup
- Appearances: 7 (first in 1978)
- Best result: (silver) 2nd (1983)

Pan American Games
- Appearances: 9 (first in 1987)
- Best result: 2nd (1991, 2019)

Pan American Cup
- Appearances: 7 (first in 2001)
- Best result: 3rd (2001, 2004, 2013, 2022)

The Canada women's national field hockey team participates in international field hockey competitions. In 1991, the Canadian men's and women's programs united under the national umbrella of Field Hockey Canada to share funding and infrastructure. The women's team made its first international appearance at the 1978 Women's Hockey World Cup in Madrid, Spain, finishing in fifth place. They were the runner-up at the 1983 Women's Hockey World Cup and the bronze medallists at the 1986 Women's Hockey World Cup.

The Canadian women's team participated in the women's international tournament for the first time in 1956. In 1979 Canada hosted 18 countries in Vancouver for that world event; Canada placed 8th. The 1978 Canadian team was the first to enter the Women's World Cup, and placed 5th.

== Tournament records ==
Olympic Games
Year	Host city	Position
1980	Moscow, Soviet Union	N/A
1984	Los Angeles, United States	5th
1988	Seoul, South Korea	6th
1992	Barcelona, Spain	7th
1996 – 2020 Did not participate

Commonwealth Games
Year	Host city	Position
1998	Kuala Lumpur, Malaysia	10th
2002	Manchester, England	7th
2006	Melbourne, Australia	7th
2010	New Delhi, India	6th
2014	Glasgow, Scotland	8th
2018	Gold Coast, Australia	5th
2022	Birmingham, England	5th

Pan American Cup
Year	Host city	Position
2001	Kingston, Jamaica	3rd
2004	Bridgetown, Barbados	3rd
2009	Hamilton, Bermuda	5th
2013	Mendoza, Argentina	3rd
2017	Lancaster, United States	4th
2022	Tacarigua, Trinidad and Tobago	3rd
2025	Montevideo, Uruguay	6th

World League
Year	Round	Host city	Position
2014–15	Round 1	Guadalajara, Mexico	1st
2014–15	Round 2	(Republic of Ireland) Dublin, Ireland	2nd
2014–15	Semi-final	Valencia, Spain	9th
2016–17	Round 2	West Vancouver, Canada	5th

World Cup
Year	Host city	Position
1974 – 1976 Did not participate
1978	Madrid, Spain	5th
1981	Buenos Aires, Argentina	5th
1983	Kuala Lumpur, Malaysia	2nd
1986	Amsterdam, Netherlands	3rd
1990	Sydney, Australia	10th
1994	(Republic of Ireland) Dublin, Ireland	10th
1998 – 2018 Did not participate
2022	Terrassa, Spain; Amstelveen, Netherlands	15th
2026	Wavre, Belgium; Amstelveen, Netherlands	DNQ

Pan American Games
Year	Host city	Position
1987	Indianapolis, United States	3rd
1991	Havana, Cuba	2nd
1995	Mar del Plata, Argentina	3rd
1999	Winnipeg, Canada	3rd
2003	Santo Domingo, Dominican Republic	5th
2007	Rio de Janeiro, Brazil	5th
2011	Guadalajara, Mexico	4th
2015	Toronto, Canada	3rd
2019	Lima, Peru	2nd
2023	Santiago, Chile	4th

Champions Trophy
Year	Host city	Position
1987	Amsterdam, Netherlands	4th
1989	Frankfurt, West Germany	6th
1991 – 2018 Did not participate

Hockey Nations Cup
Year	Host city	Position
2022	Valencia, Spain	Withdrew
2023–24	Terrassa, Spain	6th
2024–25	Santiago, Chile	8th

Hockey Series
Year	Round	Host city	Position
2018–19	Open	Salamanca, Mexico	1st
2018–19	Final	Valencia, Spain	2nd

== Team ==
=== Current roster ===
The squad for the 2022 Women's FIH Hockey World Cup.

Head coach: Rob Short

No.	Pos.	Player	Date of birth (age)	Caps	Goals	Club
3	MF	Thora Rae	October 15, 1999 (age 26)	18	4	(Canada) UBC Thunderbirds
5	DF	Alison Lee	December 24, 1994 (age 31)	65	2	(Canada) Toronto Toros
6	MF	Jordyn Faiczak	April 2, 1999 (age 27)	30	7	(Canada) UBC Thunderbirds
7	MF	Anna Mollenhauer	September 18, 1999 (age 26)	28	1	(Canada) Victoria Vikes
9	FW	Madison Thompson	August 11, 1994 (age 31)	9	4	(Canada) Polar Bears
10	DF	Kathleen Leahy	October 29, 1993 (age 32)	72	2	(Canada) Victoria Vikes
12	DF	Sara Goodman	October 22, 1999 (age 26)	20	0	(Canada) UBC Thunderbirds
13	FW	Hannah Haughn	September 4, 1994 (age 31)	192	36	(Canada) West Vancouver
14	DF	Karli Johansen	March 26, 1992 (age 34)	153	34	(Canada) West Vancouver
15	FW	Grace Delmotte	July 26, 2002 (age 24)	1	0	(United States) Wake Forest Demon Deacons
16	MF	Natalie Sourisseau (captain)	December 5, 1992 (aged 29)	158	10	(Canada) Polar Bears
17	DF	Sara McManus	August 14, 1993 (age 32)	196	30	(Canada) West Vancouver
18	DF	Alexis de Armond	April 4, 1997 (age 29)	30	0	(Canada) West Vancouver
19	MF	Audrey Sawers	November 22, 1999 (age 26)	9	0	(United States) Lafayette Leopards
21	MF	Amanda Woodcroft	October 9, 1993 (age 32)	134	10	(Canada) Polar Bears
22	MF	Madeline Secco	March 15, 1994 (age 32)	148	19	(United States) Stanford Cardinal
23	FW	Brienne Stairs	December 22, 1989 (age 36)	182	116	(Canada) Guelph Gryphons
25	DF	Shanlee Johnston	February 5, 1990 (age 36)	134	9	(Canada) Polar Bears
31	GK	Rowan Harris	August 11, 1996 (age 29)	50	0	(Canada) Vancouver Hawks
34	GK	Marcia LaPlante	August 20, 1997 (age 28)	3	0	(Canada) Polar Bears

=== Notable players ===
- Sharon Bayes
- Laura Branchaud
- Joel Brough
- Nancy Charlton
- Michelle Conn
- Deb Covey
- Sharon Creelman
- Sheila Forshaw
- Jean Major
- Laurelee Kopeck
- Sandra Levy
- Darlene Stoyka

== Results and fixtures ==
The following is a list of match results in the last 12 months, as well as any future matches that have been scheduled.

Win Draw Loss Fixture

=== 2026 ===
9 January 2026 Test Match 1	South Africa	5–0	Canada	Pretoria, South Africa
18:00	Zulu 27', 51' de Waal 29'; Brisset 56'; Mokoena 60'	Report		Stadium: Hoërskool Menlopark

10 January 2026 Test Match 2	South Africa	0–0	Canada	Pretoria, South Africa
16:00		Report		Stadium: Hoërskool Menlopark

11 January 2026 Test Match 3	South Africa	2–0	Canada	Pretoria, South Africa
10:00	Mokoena 10'; Brisset 28'	Report		Stadium: Hoërskool Menlopark

16 January 2026 Test Match 4	South Africa	0–0	Canada	Pretoria, South Africa
18:00		Report		Stadium: Hoërskool Menlopark

17 January 2026 Test Match 5	South Africa	1–0	Canada	Pretoria, South Africa
10:00	Fourie 44'	Report		Stadium: Hoërskool Menlopark

2 March 2026 WC Qualifiers Pool B	Japan	4–0	Canada	Santiago, Chile
13:00	Nakagomi 5'; Hasegawa 37'; S. Tanaka 39'; Mikami 53'	Report		Stadium: Estadio Nacional del Hockey Césped Claudia Schüler

3 March 2026 WC Qualifiers Pool B	Canada	1–6	Malaysia	Santiago, Chile
13:30	Walton 11'	Report	Hohd 9'; Azhar 20', 28'; Muhammad 36'; Zulkifli 39'; Sukri 46'	Stadium: Estadio Nacional del Hockey Césped Claudia Schüler

5 March 2026 WC Qualifiers Pool B	Canada	1–5	Ireland	Santiago, Chile
15:15	Mollenhauer 13'	Report	Torrans 25', 36'; Perdue 30'; McMaster 38'; Handcock 60'	Stadium: Estadio Nacional del Hockey Césped Claudia Schüler

7 March 2026 WC Qualifiers 5/8 Classification	France	3–0	Canada	Santiago, Chile
09:00	Van der Zanden 34'; Duffrene 37'; Varoqui 51'	Report		Stadium: Estadio Nacional del Hockey Césped Claudia Schüler

8 March 2026 WC Qualifiers 7/8 Classification	Canada	1–2	Switzerland	Santiago, Chile
09:00	Girgis 33'	Report	Pöhler 25'; Trösch 36'	Stadium: Estadio Nacional del Hockey Césped Claudia Schüler

== See also ==
- Canada men's national field hockey team
- Field hockey in Canada
