= List of international field hockey tournaments =

This is a list of the major International field hockey tournaments, in chronological order. Tournaments included are:

- Olympic Games – held every four years.
- Hockey World Cup – held every four years, in between the Olympics.
- Champions Trophy – scrapped since 2018.
- Hockey Champions Challenge – eventually replaced by now defunct World Hockey League .
- Hockey Champions Challenge II – eventually replaced by now defunct World Hockey League.
- Men's FIH Pro League and Women's FIH Pro League since 2019.

Although invitational or not open to all countries, the following are also considered international tournaments:

- Commonwealth Games – held ever four years between members of the Commonwealth of Nations
- Sultan Azlan Shah Hockey Tournament – held annually in Malaysia, an invitational tournament.
- Sultan Ibrahim Ismail Hockey Tournament -held annually for aged under-21 in Malaysia, an invitational tournament.

== List of tournaments ==
Year	Tournament	Venue(s)
2021	Olympic Games	Oi Seaside Park, Tokyo, Japan
2019	Men's Pro League	Wagener Stadium, Amstelveen, Netherlands
2019	Women's Pro League	Wagener Stadium, Amstelveen, Netherlands
2018	Men's World Cup	Kalinga Stadium, Bhubaneswar, Orissa, India
2018	Women's World Cup	Lee Valley Hockey and Tennis Centre, London, England
2016	Olympic Games	Olympic Hockey Centre, Rio de Janeiro, Brazil
2016	Men's Champions Trophy	Lee Valley Hockey and Tennis Centre, London, England
2016	Women's Champions Trophy	Lee Valley Hockey and Tennis Centre, London, England
2014	Men's World Cup	Kyocera Stadion, The Hague, Netherlands
2014	Women's World Cup	Kyocera Stadion, The Hague, Netherlands
2014	Men's Champions Trophy	Kalinga Stadium, Bhubaneswar, Orissa, India
2014	Women's Champions Trophy	Estadio Mendocino de Hockey, Mendoza, Argentina
2014	Commonwealth Games	Glasgow National Hockey Centre, Glasgow, Scotland
2013	Hockey Asia Cup	Azlan Shah Stadium, Ipoh, Malaysia
2012	Olympic Games	Riverbank Arena, London, United Kingdom
2012	Men's Champions Trophy	State Netball and Hockey Centre, Melbourne, VIC, Australia
2012	Women's Champions Trophy	Estadio Mundialista de Hockey, Rosario, Argentina
2011	Men's Champions Trophy	North Harbour Hockey Stadium, Auckland, New Zealand
2011	Women's Champions Trophy	Wagener Stadium, Amstelveen, Netherlands
2010	Men's World Cup	Dhyan Chand National Stadium, New Delhi, India
2010	Women's World Cup	Estadio Mundialista de Hockey, Rosario, Argentina
2010	Men's Champions Trophy	Warsteiner HockeyPark, Mönchengladbach, Germany
2010	Women's Champions Trophy	Nottingham, United Kingdom
2010	Commonwealth Games	Dhyan Chand National Stadium, Delhi, India
2009	Men's Champions Trophy	State Netball and Hockey Centre, Melbourne, VIC, Australia
2009	Women's Champions Trophy	Olympic Park Hockey Centre, Sydney, NSW, Australia
2009	Hockey Asia Cup	Kuantan, Malaysia
2008	Olympic Games	Olympic Green Hockey Field, Beijing, China
2008	Men's Champions Trophy	Hazelaarweg Stadion, Rotterdam, Netherlands
2008	Women's Champions Trophy	Warsteiner HockeyPark, Mönchengladbach, Germany
2007	16th Azlan Shah Hockey Tournament	Kuala Lumpur, Malaysia
2007	Men's Champions Trophy	Kuala Lumpur, Malaysia
2007	Women's Champions Trophy	Quilmes, Argentina
2006	15th Azlan Shah Hockey Tournament	Kuala Lumpur, Malaysia
2006	Men's Champions Trophy	Atlètic Terrassa, Terrassa, Spain
2006	Women's World Cup	Madrid, Spain.
2006	Men's World Cup	Warsteiner HockeyPark, Mönchengladbach, Germany.
2006	Commonwealth Games	State Netball and Hockey Centre, Melbourne, VIC, Australia
2005	Men's Champions Trophy	Mayor Radhakrishnan Stadium, Chennai, Tamil Nadu, India
2004	Olympic Games	Helliniko Olympic Hockey Centre, Athens, Greece.
2004	Men's Champions Trophy	National Hockey Stadium, Lahore, Pakistan
2003	Men's Champions Trophy	Wagener Stadium, Amstelveen, Netherlands
2002	Men's Champions Trophy	Hockey-Club Stadion Rot-Weiss, Cologne, Germany
2002	Women's World Cup	Perth, WA, Australia.
2002	Men's World Cup	Kuala Lumpur, Malaysia.
2002	Commonwealth Games	Manchester, England, United Kingdom
2001	Men's Champions Trophy	Hazelaarweg Stadion, Rotterdam, Netherlands
2000	Olympic Games	Sydney Olympic Park Hockey Centre, Sydney, NSW, Australia.
2000	Men's Champions Trophy	Wagener Stadium, Amstelveen, Netherlands
1999	Men's Champions Trophy	State Hockey Centre, Brisbane, QLD, Australia.
1998	Men's Champions Trophy	National Hockey Stadium, Lahore, Pakistan
1998	Women's World Cup	Galgenwaard Stadium, Utrecht, Netherlands.
1998	Men's World Cup	Galgenwaard Stadium, Utrecht, Netherlands.
1998	Commonwealth Games	Kuala Lumpur, Malaysia
1997	Men's Champions Trophy	Pines Hockey Stadium, Adelaide, SA, Australia
1996	Olympic Games	Panther Stadium, Atlanta, United States.
1996	Men's Champions Trophy	Mayor Radhakrishnan Stadium, Chennai, Tamil Nadu, India
1995	Men's Champions Trophy	Olympia-Stadion, Berlin, Germany
1994	Women's World Cup	Dublin, Ireland.
1994	Men's World Cup	Homebush Stadium, Sydney, NSW, Australia.
1994	Men's Champions Trophy	National Hockey Stadium, Lahore, Pakistan
1993	Men's Champions Trophy	Tun Razak Stadium, Kuala Lumpur, Malaysia.
1992	Olympic Games	Estadi Olímpic de Terrassa, Barcelona, Catalonia, Spain.
1992	Men's Champions Trophy	National Hockey Stadium, Karachi, Pakistan
1991	Men's Champions Trophy	Olympia-Stadion, Berlin, Germany
1990	Women's World Cup	Sydney, NSW, Australia.
1990	Men's World Cup	Gaddafi Stadium, Lahore, Pakistan.
1990	Men's Champions Trophy	National Hockey Centre, Melbourne, VIC, Australia
1989	Men's Champions Trophy	Olympia-Stadion, Berlin, Germany
1988	Olympic Games	Seongnam Stadium, Seoul, South Korea.
1988	Men's Champions Trophy	National Hockey Stadium, Lahore, Pakistan
1987	Men's Champions Trophy	Wagener Stadium, Amstelveen, Netherlands
1986	Women's World Cup	Amstelveen, Netherlands.
1986	Men's World Cup	Willesden, London, England.
1986	Men's Champions Trophy	National Hockey Stadium, Karachi, Pakistan
1985	Men's Champions Trophy	Perth Hockey Stadium, Perth, WA, Australia
1984	Olympic Games	Weingart Stadium, Los Angeles, CA, United States.
1984	Men's Champions Trophy	National Hockey Stadium, Karachi, Pakistan
1983	Women's World Cup	Kuala Lumpur, Malaysia.
1983	Men's Champions Trophy	National Hockey Stadium, Karachi, Pakistan
1982	Men's World Cup	BHA Stadium, Mumbai, Maharashtra, India.
1982	Men's Champions Trophy	Wagener Stadium, Amstelveen, Netherlands
1981	Men's Champions Trophy	National Hockey Stadium, Karachi, Pakistan
1981	Women's World Cup	Buenos Aires, Argentina.
1980	Men's Champions Trophy	National Hockey Stadium, Karachi, Pakistan
1980	Olympic Games	Young Pioneers Stadium, Moscow, USSR.
1978	Women's World Cup	Madrid, Spain.
1978	Men's World Cup	Campo del Polo, Buenos Aires, Argentina.
1978	Men's Champions Trophy	Gaddafi Cricket Stadium, Lahore, Pakistan
1976	Olympic Games	Molson Stadium, Montreal, PQ, Canada.
1976	Women's World Cup	Berlin, West Germany.
1975	Men's World Cup	Merdeka Stadium, Kuala Lumpur, Malaysia.
1974	Women's World Cup	Mandelieu, France.
1973	Men's World Cup	Wagener Stadium, Amstelveen, Netherlands.
1972	Olympic Games	Hockeyanlage, Munich, West Germany.
1971	Men's World Cup	Real Polo Grounds, Barcelona, Catalonia, Spain.
