= Martina Koch =

Martina Koch may refer to:

- Martina Koch (golfer) (born 1965), German professional golfer
- Martina Hallmen (born 1959), née Koch, German field hockey player
