= Field hockey in Canada =

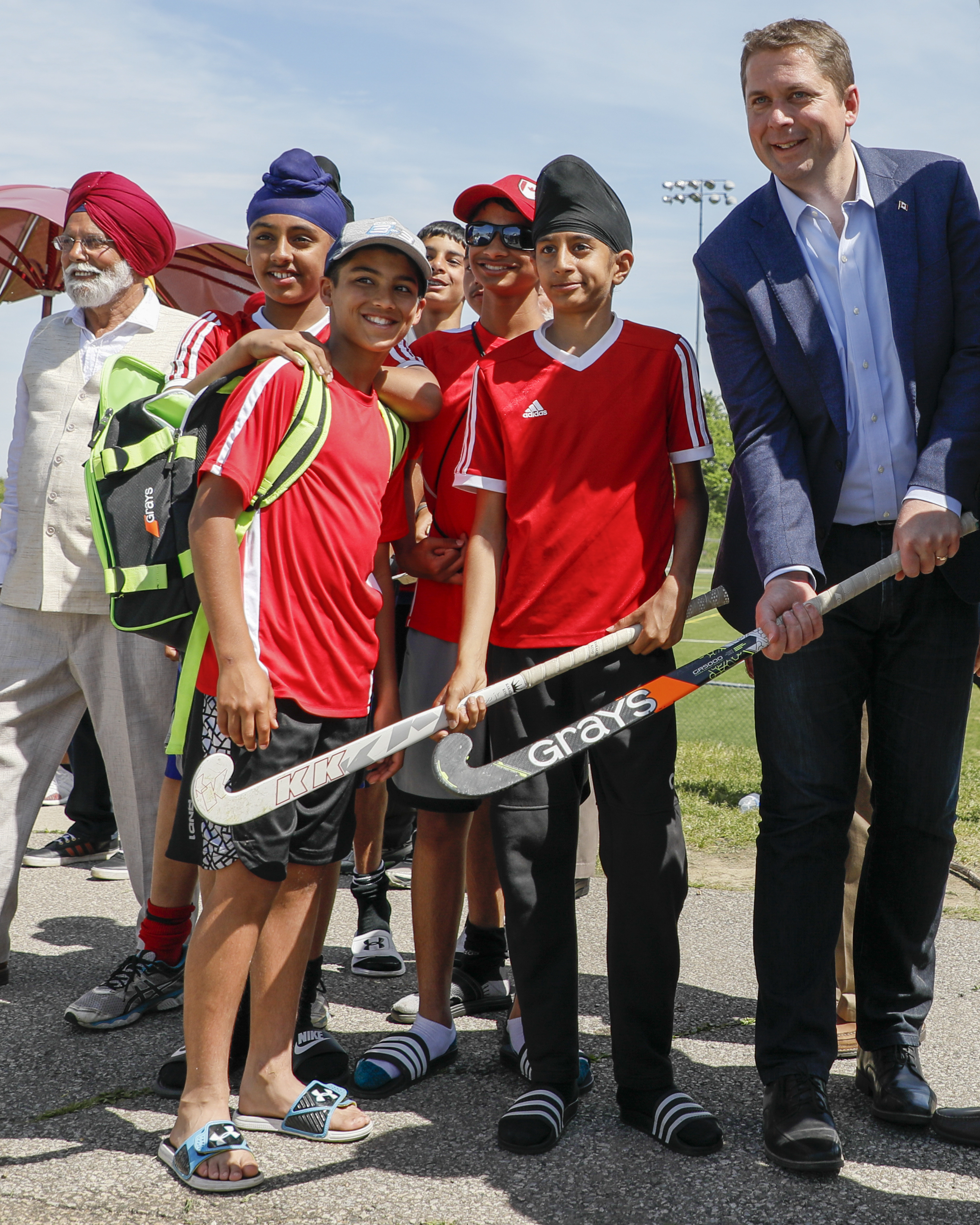
Andrew Scheer attending a junior tournament at the Canadian Field Hockey & Cultural Club

Field Hockey is a sport played in Canada under the national governing body Field Hockey Canada.

== See also ==
- Canada men's national field hockey team
- Canada women's national field hockey team
