= Stoika =

Stoika or Stoyka could be both a feminine given name and a surname. Notable people with this name include:

== As a given name ==
- Stoyka Krasteva (born 1985), Bulgarian boxer
- Stoika Milanova (1945–2024), Bulgarian violinist

== As a surname ==
- Constantin T. Stoika (1892–1916), Romanian poet and prose writer
- Darlene Stoyka (born 1956), Canadian field hockey player
- Oleksandr Stoyka (1890–1943), Greek Catholic hierarch
