= Irene Hendriks =

Dutch field hockey player (born 1958)

Medal record

Women's field hockey

Representing the Netherlands

Olympic Games
Gold medal – first place	1984 Los Angeles	Team competition

World Cup
Gold medal – first place	1978 Madrid	Team competition
Gold medal – first place	1983 Kuala Lumpur	Team competition
Silver medal – second place	1981 Buenos Aires	Team competition

European Championship
Gold medal – first place	1984 Lille	Team competition

Irene Desiree Hélène Hendriks (born 13 April 1958 in Ngaliema, Belgian Congo) is a former Dutch field hockey player, who won the golden medal with the National Women's Team at the 1984 Summer Olympics in Los Angeles, California.

From 1978 to 1985 Hendriks played a total number of 74 international matches for Holland, in which she scored twelve goals. She played in three World Cups.
