= Ingrid Bruckert =

German field hockey player

Personal information
- Born: 19 November 1952 (age 73) Braunschweig, Lower; Saxony, West Germany

Sport
- Sport: Field hockey
- Position: Defender
Senior career
Years	Team	Caps	Goals
–	Eintracht Braunschweig	-	-
National team
Years	Team	Caps	Goals
1976–1984	West Germany	110	-
Medal record
Women's field hockey
Representing West Germany
Women's Hockey World Cup
Gold medal – first place	1976 West Berlin	Team
Silver medal – second place	1978 Madrid	Team
Gold medal – first place	1981 Buenos Aires	Team
IFWHA World Championship
Silver medal – second place	1979 Vancouver	Team
Indoor Nations Championship
Gold medal – first place	1977 Brussels	Team
Gold medal – first place	1981 West Berlin	Team

Ingrid Bruckert (born 19 November 1952), also known as Ingrid Bruckert-Redmer, is a retired German field hockey player.

Bruckert played for Eintracht Braunschweig. With her club, she won seven German championship titles. She also played 110 games in total for the German national team.

With West Germany, Bruckert won the 1976 and 1981 Women's Hockey World Cups. She was also called up to the West German squad for the 1980 Summer Olympics. However, due to the 1980 Summer Olympics boycott, the West German team ultimately did not enter the tournament.

In 1977, Bruckert was awarded the Silbernes Lorbeerblatt. In 1988, she was inducted into the hall of fame of the Lower Saxon Institute of Sports History.
