= Rowan Harris =

Canadian field hockey player

Personal information
- Full name: Rowan Francis Harris
- Born: 11 August 1996 (age 29) Vancouver, British Columbia, Canada

Sport
- Sport: Field hockey
- Position: Goalkeeper
National team
Years	Team	Caps	Goals
2016–	Canada	77	(0)
2021–	Canada Indoor	13	(0)
Medal record
Women's field hockey
Representing Canada
Pan American Cup
Bronze medal – third place	2022 Santiago	Team
FIH Hockey Series
Silver medal – second place	2018–19 Valencia	Team
Women's indoor hockey
Indoor Pan American Cup
Silver medal – second place	2021 Spring City	Team

Rowan Francis Harris (born 11 August 1996) is a field and indoor hockey goalkeeper from Canada.

== Personal life ==
Rowan Harris was born in Vancouver, before moving to and growing up in Ottawa.

She studied Science at the University of British Columbia.

== Field hockey ==
Harris made her senior international debut in 2016. She earned her first cap in a test match against the United States in Chula Vista. She followed this up with further appearances throughout the year, competing in more test matches, as well as the Hawke's Bay Cup in Hastings.

She won her first medal with the national team in 2019, taking home silver at the FIH Series Finals in Valencia.

In 2022 she was a member of Canada's historic bronze medal-winning team at the Pan American Cup in Santiago. The bronze medal secured Canada's qualification to the FIH World Cup for the first time in 28 years. Harris went on to compete at the FIH World Cup held in Terrassa and Amsterdam, with the squad ultimately finishing in last place.

She competed at the 2023 Pan American Games in Santiago.

== Indoor hockey ==
Harris made her indoor hockey debut in 2021, winning silver at the Indoor Pan American Cup in Spring City.

She also competed at the 2023 FIH Indoor World Cup in Pretoria.

== Other people named Rowan Harris ==
Rowan Harris is a typographer, ambigrammer and Initial Teaching Alphabet fan from the UK that has multiple different accounts online.
