= Eva Pagels =

German field hockey player

Personal information
- Born: 31 October 1954 (age 71) Braunschweig, West Germany

Sport
- Sport: Field hockey
Senior career
Years	Team	Caps	Goals
1973–	Eintracht Braunschweig	-	-
National team
Years	Team	Caps	Goals
1976–1982	West Germany	61	-
Medal record
Women's field hockey
Representing West Germany
Women's Hockey World Cup
Silver medal – second place	1978 Madrid	Team
Gold medal – first place	1981 Buenos Aires	Team
IFWHA World Championship
Silver medal – second place	1979 Vancouver	Team

Eva Plotek née Pagels (born 31 October 1954) is a retired German field hockey player.

Pagels played for Eintracht Braunschweig. She joined the club as a youth player in 1966 and was promoted to the first team in 1973. With Braunschweig, she won seven German championship titles. She also played 61 games in total for the German national team.

With West Germany, Pagels won the 1981 Women's Hockey World Cup. She was also called up to the West German squad for the 1980 Summer Olympics. However, due to the 1980 Summer Olympics boycott, the West German team ultimately didn't enter the tournament.

In 1981, Pagels was awarded the Silbernes Lorbeerblatt. In 1988, she was inducted into the hall of fame of the Lower Saxon Institute of Sports History.
