= Elsemieke Hillen =

Dutch field hockey player

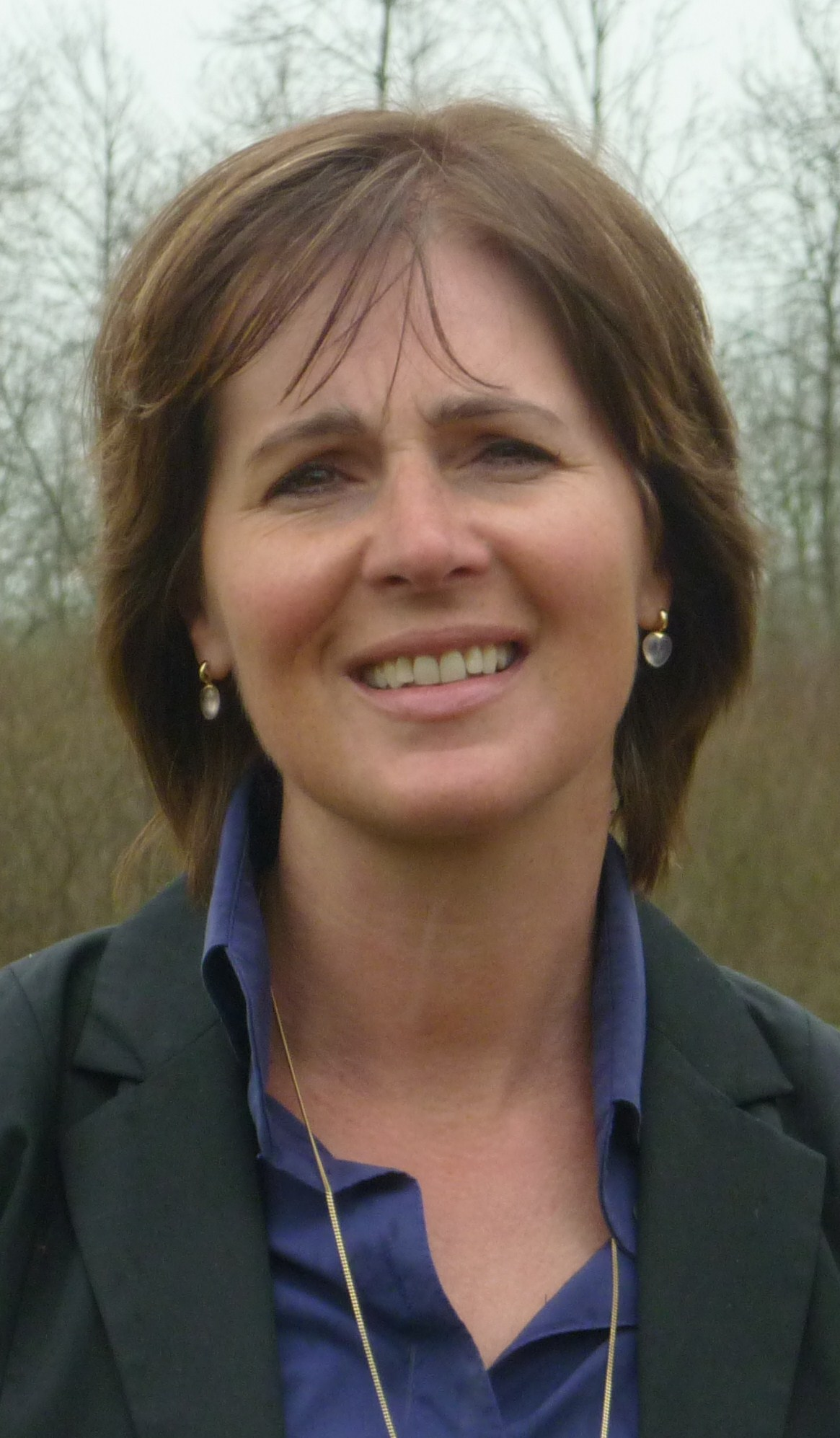
- Elsemieke Hillen in 2010

Personal information
- Born: 30 September 1959 (age 66) The Hague, the Netherlands
- Height: 172 cm (5 ft 8 in)
- Weight: 66 kg (146 lb)

Sport
- Sport: Field Hockey
- Club: AH&BC, Amsterdam
Medal record
Representing the Netherlands
Olympic Games
Gold medal – first place	1984 Los Angeles	Team
World Cup
Gold medal – first place	1978 Madrid	Team
Silver medal – second place	1981 Buenos Aires	Team
Gold medal – first place	1983 Kuala Lumpur	Team
Gold medal – first place	1986 Amstelveen	Team
EuroHockey Nations Championship
Gold medal – first place	1984 Lille	Team

Francisca Elisabeth "Elsemieke " Maria Havenga-Hillen (born 30 September 1959) is a Dutch retired field hockey forward, who won the gold medal at the 1984 Summer Olympics.

From 1978 to 1986 she played a total number of 106 international matches for Holland, in which she scored ten goals. Hillen retired after the 1986 Women's Hockey World Cup in Amstelveen, where the Dutch won the title. She later became a TV host for the newsbulletin of RTL 4.
