= Margriet Zegers =

Dutch field hockey player

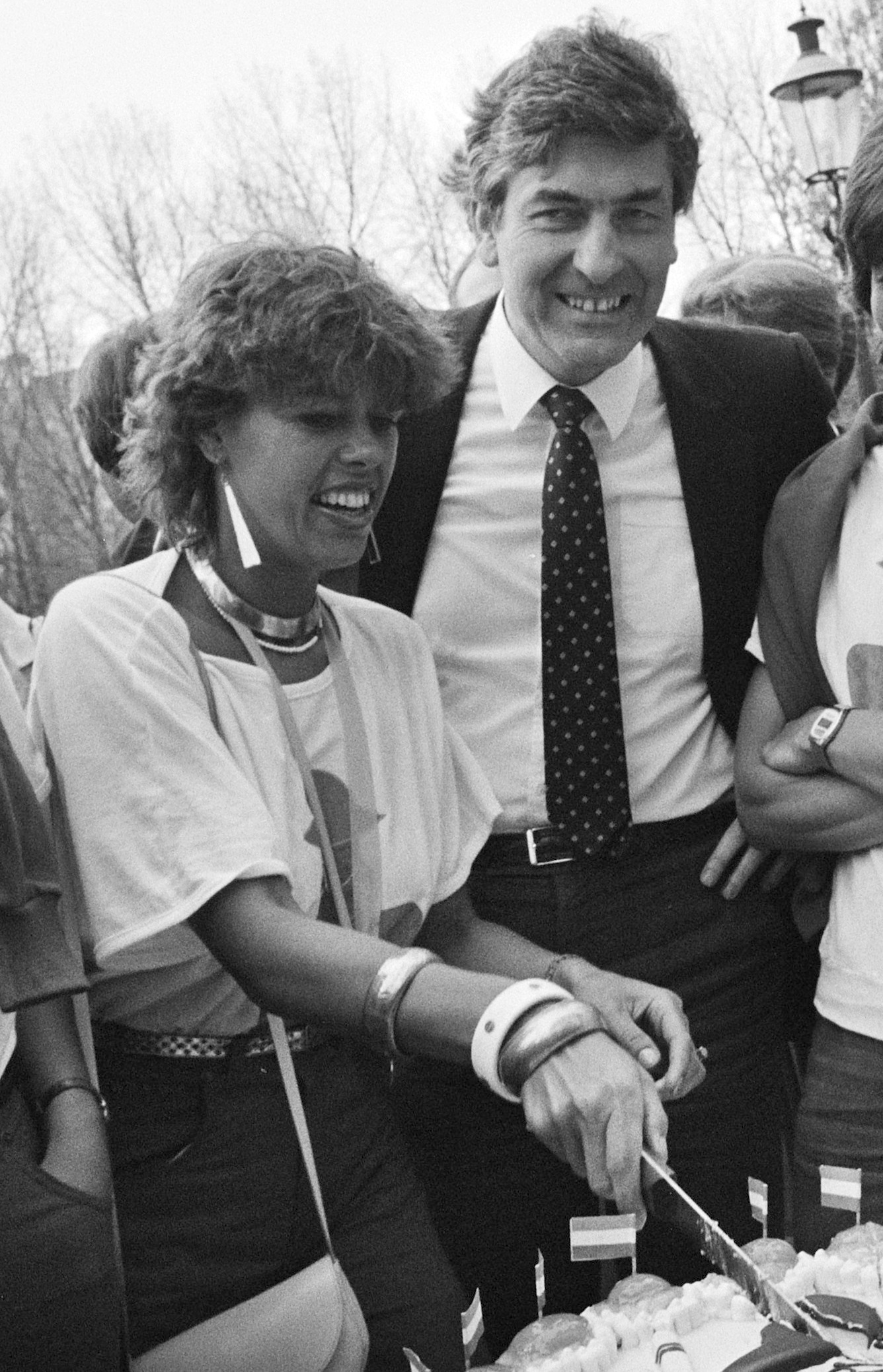
- Margriet Zegers with Prime Minister Lubbers in 1983

Personal information
- Born: 29 April 1954 (age 72) Heerenveen, the Netherlands
- Height: 1.70 m (5 ft 7 in)
- Weight: 60 kg (132 lb)

Sport
- Sport: Field hockey
- Club: AH&BC, Amsterdam
Medal record
Representing the Netherlands
Olympic Games
| Gold medal – first place | 1984 Los Angeles | Team |
World Cup
| Silver medal – second place | 1981 Buenos Aires | Team |
| Gold medal – first place | 1983 Kuala Lumpur | Team |
European Nations Cup
| Gold medal – first place | 1984 Lille | Team |

Inge Margriet Zegers-de Ruiter (born 29 April 1954) is a retired Dutch field hockey defender, who won a gold medal at the 1984 Summer Olympics. From 1980 to 1984 she played 55 international matches and scored no goals. She is married to Olympic freestyle skier Michiel de Ruiter.
