= Margriet Bleijerveld =

Dutch field hockey player

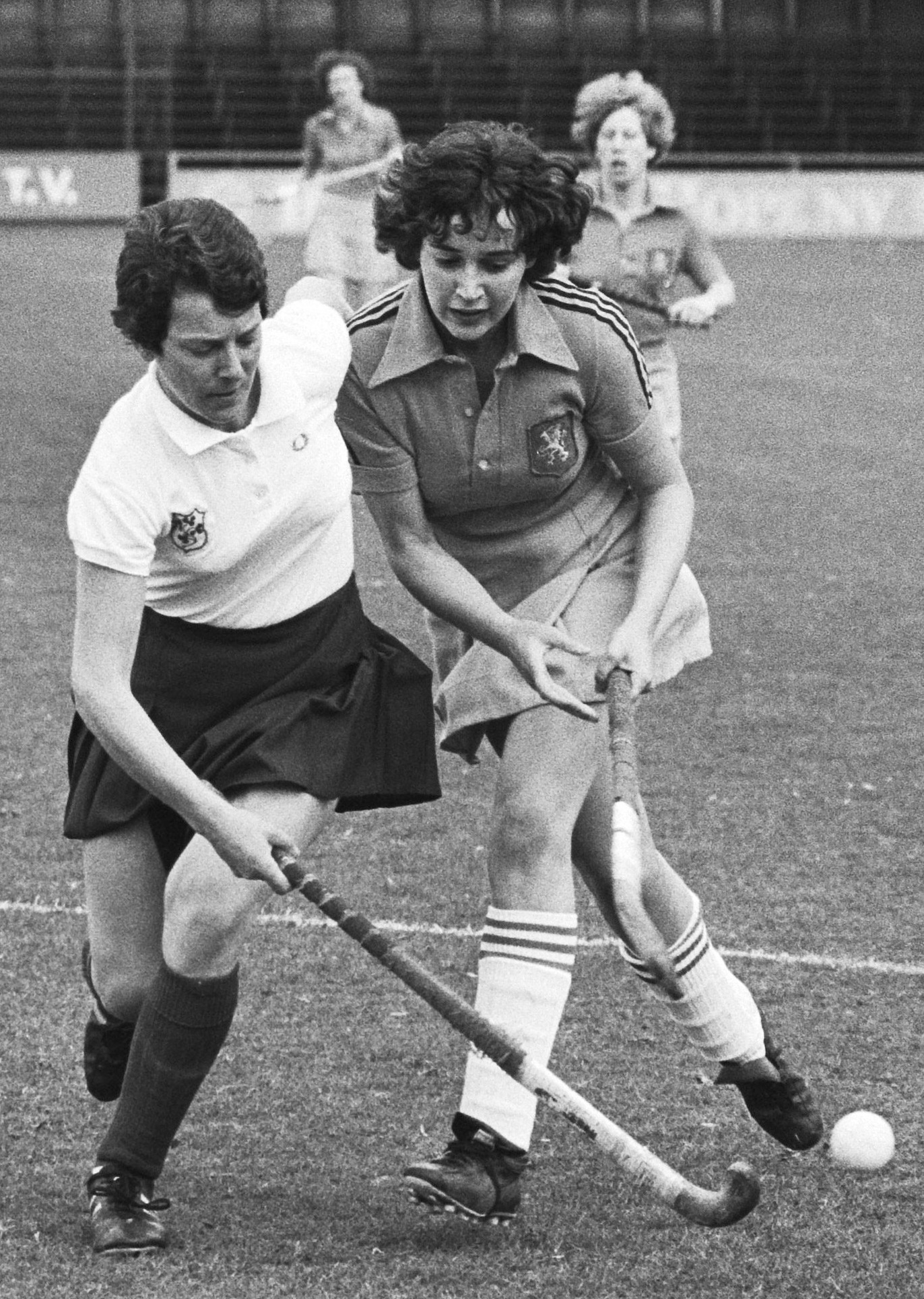
- Margriet Bleijerveld (right) in 1978

Personal information
- Born: 16 April 1958 (age 68)

Sport
- Sport: Field hockey
- Club: Upward
Medal record
Representing the Netherlands
World Cup
Gold medal – first place	1978 Madrid	Team
Silver medal – second place	1981 Buenos Aires	Team

Margriet Bleijerveld (born 16 April 1958) is a retired Dutch field hockey player, who won a gold medal and a silver medal at the 1978 and 1981 World Cups, respectively. From 1978 to 1982, she played 41 international matches, in which she scored six goals.
