= Beth Beglin =

American field hockey player

Personal information
- Full name: Elizabeth Anne Beglin
- Born: April 2, 1957 (age 69) Teaneck, New Jersey, U.S.
- Height: 5 ft 5 in (165 cm)
- Weight: 127 lb (58 kg)

Sport
- Sport: Field Hockey
Medal record
Women's Field Hockey
Representing the United States
Olympic Games
| Bronze medal – third place | 1984 Los Angeles | Team |

Elizabeth Anne Beglin (born April 2, 1957, in Teaneck, New Jersey) is a former field hockey player from the United States, who was a member of the Women's National Team that won the bronze medal at the 1984 Summer Olympics in Los Angeles, California.

== Education ==
Beglin grew up in Upper Saddle River, New Jersey. She attended Northern Highlands Regional High School in Allendale, New Jersey, and was inducted in 2011 into the school's hall of fame.

== Olympics ==
Beglin qualified for the 1980 Olympic team but did not compete due to the Olympic Committee's boycott of the 1980 Summer Olympics in Moscow, Russia. She was one of 461 athletes to receive a Congressional Gold Medal years later. When the United States hosted the Games in 1984, she once again represented her native country and was part of the bronze medal team. Four years later, she was a member of the team that competed at the 1988 Summer Olympics in Seoul, South Korea.

== Coaching ==
From 1988 to 1999, Beglin was the field hockey coach at the University of Iowa where the team won 25 straight Big Ten Conference matches from 1990 to 1993 and 45 consecutive home matches on Grant Field from 1988 to 1994.
