= Field Hockey Canada =

Sports organisation

- Sport: Field hockey
- Founded: 1991 (merger)
- Affiliation: FIH
- Regional affiliation: PAHF
- Replaced: Previously men's and women's programs were separate (merger in 1991)

Official website
- www.fieldhockey.ca
- (Canada)

Field Hockey Canada (FHC) is the national sports organization responsible for the development and growth of field hockey in Canada. In collaboration with provincial and club members, FHC provides programs and resources to support the field hockey community from the pitch to the podium.

Prior to 1991, the Canadian men’s and women’s field hockey programs were operating independently as separate national entities. The creation of Field Hockey Canada was the result of transitioning and uniting both programs under one umbrella.

National Teams include Senior Men, Senior Women, Junior Men and Junior Women.

Approximately 18,000 Canadians play field hockey, with 9,000 participating in high school field hockey programs. Field hockey is currently played in more than 600 schools and 400 clubs across the country.

== History ==
=== Origins ===
Field hockey arrived in Canada in the late 19th century due to the British Army which had been traveling throughout the Commonwealth nations. Eventually both men's and women's programs emerged. The modern form of field hockey was first played in Canada in British Columbia.

=== Women ===
In 1896, the first recorded match in Canada was played by Vancouver girls, and the Vancouver Ladies Club was formed. The first women's organization in Canada was formed in Vancouver in 1927.

=== Men ===
Men were playing at the turn of the century in Vancouver and Victoria, and a Vancouver League came into existence in 1902. Following World War II, players who had immigrated to Canada from former Commonwealth countries were involved in developing the sport in Canada and, by 1959, field hockey clubs had been formed in Ontario and Alberta.

=== Merger ===
In the early 1990s, the men's Canadian Field Hockey Association (CFHA) and Canadian Women's Canadian Field Hockey Association (CWFHA) organizations merged to form Field Hockey Canada.

== National Championships ==
In Canada, the national field hockey championships are called the FHC (Field Hockey Canada) National Championships. As of 2024 there were two separate divisions for the FHC National Championships:

- Under 18 National Championships
- Under 16 National Championships

== Jr. Pan American Championships 2024 ==
Field Hockey Canada hosted Junior Pan American Championships in Surrey British Columbia Canada from July 2nd to July 12th, 2024, on Tamanawis Field Hockey park. The event was attended by thousands of spectators and was livestreamed online. This was a Junior World Cup qualifier event and the men's Canadian team qualified for the Junior World Cup.

== See also ==
- Bando (sport)
- Shinty
- Hurling
- Camogie
