= Sandra Mackie =

New Zealand field hockey player

Sandra Jean Mackie (born 24 November 1959 in Hamilton, New Zealand) is a retired field hockey player from New Zealand, who was a member of the national team that finished sixth at the 1984 Summer Olympics in Los Angeles.
