= Robyn Holmes =

Australian hockey player

Personal information
- Nationality: Australian
- Born: 19 February 1964 (age 62)

Sport
- Sport: Field hockey

Robyn Holmes (born 19 February 1964) is an Australian field hockey player. She competed in the women's tournament at the 1984 Summer Olympics.
