= Matthew Spies =

Australian modern pentathlete

Personal information
- Born: 18 August 1961 (age 64)

Sport
- Sport: Modern pentathlon

Matthew Spies (born 18 August 1961) is an Australian modern pentathlete. He competed at the 1984 Summer Olympics.
