= Sue McLeish =

New Zealand field hockey player (born 1954)

Susan Marie McLeish (born 18 August 1954) is a retired field hockey player from New Zealand, who was a member of the national team that finished sixth at the 1984 Summer Olympics in Los Angeles. She was born in Whangārei.
