= María Colombo (field hockey) =

Argentine field hockey player

Personal information
- Born: February 14, 1962 (age 64)
Medal record
Women's field hockey
Representing Argentina
Pan American Games
Gold medal – first place	1987 Indianapolis	Team

María Cecilia Colombo de Serrano (born February 14, 1962) is a retired female field hockey defender from Argentina. She was a member of the Women's National Team that finished in seventh place at the 1988 Summer Olympics in Seoul, South Korea after having won the gold medal the previous year at the Pan American Games in Indianapolis.

== International tournaments ==
- 1983 World Cup in Malaysia
- 1986 World Cup in Amsterdam
- 1987 Pan American Games in USA
- 1988 Summer Olympics in Seoul
