= Sharon Kellett =

Australian swimmer

Personal information
- Born: 29 March 1968 (age 58)

Sport
- Sport: Swimming

Sharon Kellett (born 29 March 1968) is an Australian swimmer. She competed in two events at the 1984 Summer Olympics.
