= Jillian Smith =

New Zealand field hockey player

Jillian Clare "Jill" Morgan formerly Jillian Smith (born 12 June 1958) is a retired field hockey player from New Zealand, who was a member of the national team that finished sixth at the 1984 Summer Olympics in Los Angeles.
