= Russell Sherwell =

Australian water polo player

Personal information
- Born: August 1, 1960 (age 64)

Sport
- Sport: Water polo

Russell Sherwell (born 1 August 1960) is an Australian former water polo player who competed in the 1984 Summer Olympics.
