= John Watters (cyclist) =

Australian cyclist

Personal information
- Born: 24 February 1955 (age 71)

Cycling career
- Sport: Cycling
Medal record
Representing AUS
Men's cycling
Commonwealth Games
Silver medal – second place	1982 Brisbane	Road team time trial

John Watters (born 24 February 1955) is an Australian former cyclist. He competed in the individual road race and the team time trial events at the 1984 Summer Olympics.
