= Jane Swinnerton =

British field hockey player

Jane Swinnerton (born 7 May 1954) is a former British field hockey player who won over 100 caps for England between 1977 and 1987. Swinnerton tied for the most goals scored in the 1991/92 season. She played most of her career with Sutton Coldfield Hockey Club. Arguably the greatest highlight of her club career was part of the Sutton Coldfield team that won the European championships in Vught, Holland in 1992. She was selected for two Olympic squads '80 & '84 but never made it as political reasons meant certain teams were not allowed to travel in those years.

She has a long spell as England Ladies Manager, until she retired from that in 1997 for the birth of her first son Callum.

In 2010, Swinnerton was invited to take part in a Legends match prior to the national hockey championship. This was a 'Wembley Legends' match for all ex England ladies players to celebrate the times they had playing on the grass at the old Wembley.

She played her last Hockey at Cannock, where she helped win promotion to the National League. She worked as a PE teacher in the south Staffordshire school "Cannock Chase High School" until 2012, when she retired.
