= Gary Trowell =

Australian cyclist

Personal information
- Nickname: Gazza
- Born: 10 April 1959 (age 67) Melbourne, Australia
- Height: 1.8 m (5 ft 11 in)

Cycling career
- Sport: Cycling

Gary Trowell (born 10 April 1959) is an Australian former cyclist. He competed in the individual road race and the team time trial events at the 1984 Summer Olympics.
