= Evelyn Botfield =

Australian field hockey player

Personal information
- Nationality: Australian
- Born: 29 January 1957 (age 69)

Sport
- Sport: Field hockey

Evelyn Botfield (born 29 January 1957) is an Australian field hockey player who competed in the women's tournament at the 1984 Summer Olympics.
