= Penny Dunbabin =

Australian field hockey player

Personal information
- Full name: Penelope Dunbabin
- Nationality: Australian
- Born: Penny Gray; 12 October 1958 Launceston, Tasmania, Australia
- Died: 21 May 2014 (aged 55)

Sport
- Sport: Field hockey

Penny Dunbabin (née Gray; 12 October 1958 – 21 May 2014) was an Australian field hockey player. She competed in the women's tournament at the 1984 Summer Olympics.
