= Jean Major =

Canadian field hockey player

Jean Major (born 29 September 1957) is a Canadian former field hockey player who competed in the 1984 Summer Olympics.
