= Lynne Beecroft =

Canadian field hockey player

Lynne Beecroft (born 9 May 1957 in Comox, British Columbia) is a Canadian former field hockey player who competed in the 1984 Summer Olympics.
