= Patricia Ott =

German field hockey player

Personal information
- Born: 15 May 1960 (age 66) Frankfurt, West Germany
- Height: 168 cm (5 ft 6 in)
- Weight: 61 kg (134 lb)

Sport
- Sport: Field hockey
Medal record
Women's field hockey
Representing West Germany
Olympic Games
Silver medal – second place	1984 Los Angeles	Team competition

Patricia "Patsy" Ott (born 15 May 1960 in Frankfurt) is a German former field hockey player who competed in the 1984 Summer Olympics.
