= Julie Staver =

American field hockey player

Personal information
- Full name: Julia Ann Staver
- Born: April 4, 1952 (age 74) Hershey, Pennsylvania, U.S.
Medal record
Women's Field Hockey
Representing the United States
Olympic Games
Bronze medal – third place	1984 Los Angeles	Team competition

Julia Ann "Julie" Staver (born April 4, 1952) is a former field hockey player from the United States, who was a member of the national team that won the bronze medal at the 1984 Summer Olympics in Los Angeles, California. She had previously qualified for the 1980 Olympic team but did not compete due to the Olympic Committee's boycott of the 1980 Summer Olympics in Moscow, Russia. As consolation, she was one of 461 athletes to receive a Congressional Gold Medal many years later.

== Biography ==
Julie Staver was born and raised in Hershey, Pennsylvania. She was the University of Pennsylvania's outstanding athlete when women's athletics was accorded varsity team status in the early 1970s.

The recipient of the Father's Trophy as UPenn's outstanding senior woman athlete in 1974, she was an All-American in field hockey (1973) and lacrosse (1973, 1974). Staver captained the 1980 U.S. Olympic field hockey team and was a co-captain of the 1984 bronze medal-winning Olympic team. She played on numerous U.S. national field hockey and lacrosse teams throughout the 1970s and 1980s, including field hockey World Cup teams in 1979 and 1982, and was inducted into the U.S. Field Hockey Association Hall of Fame in 1989.

Staver returned to UPenn after graduation to study for a degree in veterinary medicine, which she received in 1982. The field hockey and lacrosse programs now annually present the Julie Staver Award to the outstanding athlete who competes in both sports.
