= Judy Strong =

American field hockey player

Personal information
- Born: March 26, 1960 (age 66) Northampton, Massachusetts, U.S.
Medal record
Women's Field Hockey
Representing the United States
Olympic Games
| Bronze medal – third place | 1984 Los Angeles | Team competition |

Judith Ann Strong (born March 26, 1960) is a former field hockey player from the United States, who was a member of the Women's National Team that won the bronze medal at the 1984 Summer Olympics in Los Angeles, California. She briefly coached field hockey at Western New England University located in Springfield, Massachusetts. Currently, Strong is a field hockey and lacrosse referee at the collegiate level.

Strong played collegiate field hockey at the University of Massachusetts Amherst. She was a physical education teacher at Smith College where she also coached field hockey and lacrosse.
