= Shirley Haig =

New Zealand field hockey player

Shirley Ethel Haig (born 12 August 1950) is a retired field hockey player from New Zealand, who was a member of the national team that finished sixth at the 1984 Summer Olympics in Los Angeles. She was born in East Gore.
