= Terry Wheatley =

Canadian field hockey player

Terry Wheatley (born July 28, 1960, in Saskatoon) is a Canadian former field hockey player who competed in the 1984 Summer Olympics.
