= Birgit Hahn =

German field hockey player

Personal information
- Born: 29 June 1958 (age 68) Mönchengladbach, West Germany
- Height: 166 cm (5 ft 5 in)
- Weight: 60 kg (132 lb)

Sport
- Sport: Field hockey
Medal record
Women's field hockey
Representing West Germany
Olympic Games
Silver medal – second place	1984 Los Angeles	Team competition

Birgit Hahn (born 29 June 1958 in Mönchengladbach) is a German former field hockey player who competed in the 1984 Summer Olympics. She is the aunt of Lisa Hahn who also played Olympic hockey for Germany.
