= Pamela Glossop =

Australian hockey player

Personal information
- Nationality: Australian
- Born: 22 September 1954 (age 71)

Sport
- Sport: Field hockey

Pamela Glossop (born 22 September 1954) is an Australian former field hockey player. She competed in the women's tournament at the 1984 Summer Olympics.
