= Colleen Pearce =

Australian field hockey player

Personal information
- Nationality: Australian
- Born: 20 December 1961 (age 64)

Sport
- Sport: Field hockey
Medal record
Women's field hockey
Representing Australia
World Cup
Bronze medal – third place	1983 Kuala Lumpur	Team

Colleen Pearce (born 20 December 1961) is an Australian field hockey player. She competed in the women's tournament at the 1984 Summer Olympics. She is the daughter of the 1964 Bronze and 1968 Silver medal winning Olympian Eric Pearce.
