= Tricia Heberle =

Australian field hockey player

Patricia Heberle is an international field hockey player, coach and administrator whose involvement has spanned the Australia women's national field hockey team and England women's national field hockey team.

She played international hockey from 1983 to 1986. She held international coaching roles for Australia and England from 1994 to 2004, and has been a High Performance Administrator from 2005 to 2014.

In 2018, she was unveiled as Team Ireland's Chef de Mission for the 2020 Olympic Games.

== International playing career ==
- 1983 Women's Hockey World Cup Kuala Lumpur, Malaysia - bronze medal
- 1984 Summer Olympics Los Angeles, USA - 4th
- 1986 Women's Hockey World Cup Amstelveen, Netherlands - 6th

== International coaching career ==
Tricia has been involved in success at the highest level of international hockey tournaments in coaching/assistant coaching roles including with the following tournaments:

- 1994 World Cup (AUS women) Dublin, IRE - gold medal
- 1995 Champions Trophy (AUS women) Mar del Plata, ARG - gold medal
- 1996 Olympic Games (AUS women) Atlanta, USA - gold medal
- 1997 Champions Trophy (AUS women) Berlin, GER - gold medal
- 1998 World Cup (AUS women) Utrecht, NED - gold medal
- 1998 Commonwealth Games (AUS women) Kuala Lumpur, MAS - gold medal
- 1999 Champions Trophy (AUS women) Brisbane, AUS - gold medal
- 1999 Oceania Cup (AUS women) Sydney, AUS - gold medal
- 2000 Champions Trophy (AUS women) Amstelveen, NED - bronze medal
- 2000 Summer Olympics (AUS women) Sydney, AUS - gold medal
- 2001 World Cup Qualifier (ENG women) Amiens, FRA - gold medal
- 2002 Commonwealth Games (ENG women) Manchester, ENG - silver medal
- 2002 World Cup (ENG women) Perth, AUS - 5th
- 2002 Champions Trophy (ENG women) Macau, CHN - 6th
- 2002 Champions Challenge (ENG women) Randburg, RSA - gold medal
- 2003 Champions Trophy (ENG women) Sydney, AUS - 5th
