= Corinna Lingnau =

German field hockey player

Personal information
- Full name: Corinna Margarete Lingnau
- Born: 18 January 1960 (age 66) Leverkusen, West Germany
- Height: 162 cm (5 ft 4 in)
- Weight: 55 kg (121 lb)

Sport
- Sport: Field hockey
Medal record
Women's field hockey
Representing West Germany
Olympic Games
Silver medal – second place	1984 Los Angeles	Team competition

Corinna Margarete Lingnau (born 18 January 1960 in Leverkusen) is a German former field hockey player who competed in the 1984 Summer Olympics.
