= Kym Ireland =

Australian field hockey player (1955–2025)

Kym Ireland (25 October 1955 – 9 December 2025) was an Australian field hockey player.

Ireland represented Australia in the Australia women's national field hockey team at the 1984 Summer Olympics in Los Angeles. She was the team's goalkeeper. It was the first time the Hockeyroos had represented Australia at the Olympic Games. Placing fourth overall, the team did not win a medal. However, one of the highlights of Ireland's performance was stopping 11 shots from Beth Anders' 12 attempts at goal in Australia's victory over the United States.

Ireland returned to her hometown of Rockhampton, Queensland, in 2013 after spending 15 years in Brisbane where she coached at schools and hockey clubs.

After returning to Rockhampton, Ireland began coaching local hockey team the Park Avenue Brothers.

Not long after her return to Rockhampton, Ireland discovered that a Ukrainian artist living in the city had painted a life-sized portrait of her, along with 20other Olympians. The artist had painted the portraits in 2004 but had decided to start selling them. Ireland bought the painting of herself for $30. The painting had been previously displayed with the others at Rockhampton's historic customs house during the 2008 Summer Olympics.

In 2014, Ireland said she was disappointed in the way that Kookaburra player Jamie Dwyer, also from Rockhampton, was told he would not be competing at the 2014 Commonwealth Games after being told in an email that he was axed from the team. Ireland said such a procedure was wrong and needed to be addressed.

Ireland died from cancer on 9 December 2025, at the age of 70.
