= Harina Kohere =

New Zealand field hockey player (born 1953)

Harina Margaret Kohere (born 14 July 1953 in Rangitukia) is a retired field hockey player from New Zealand, who was a member of the national team that finished sixth at the 1984 Summer Olympics in Los Angeles.
