= Fieke Boekhorst =

Dutch field hockey player

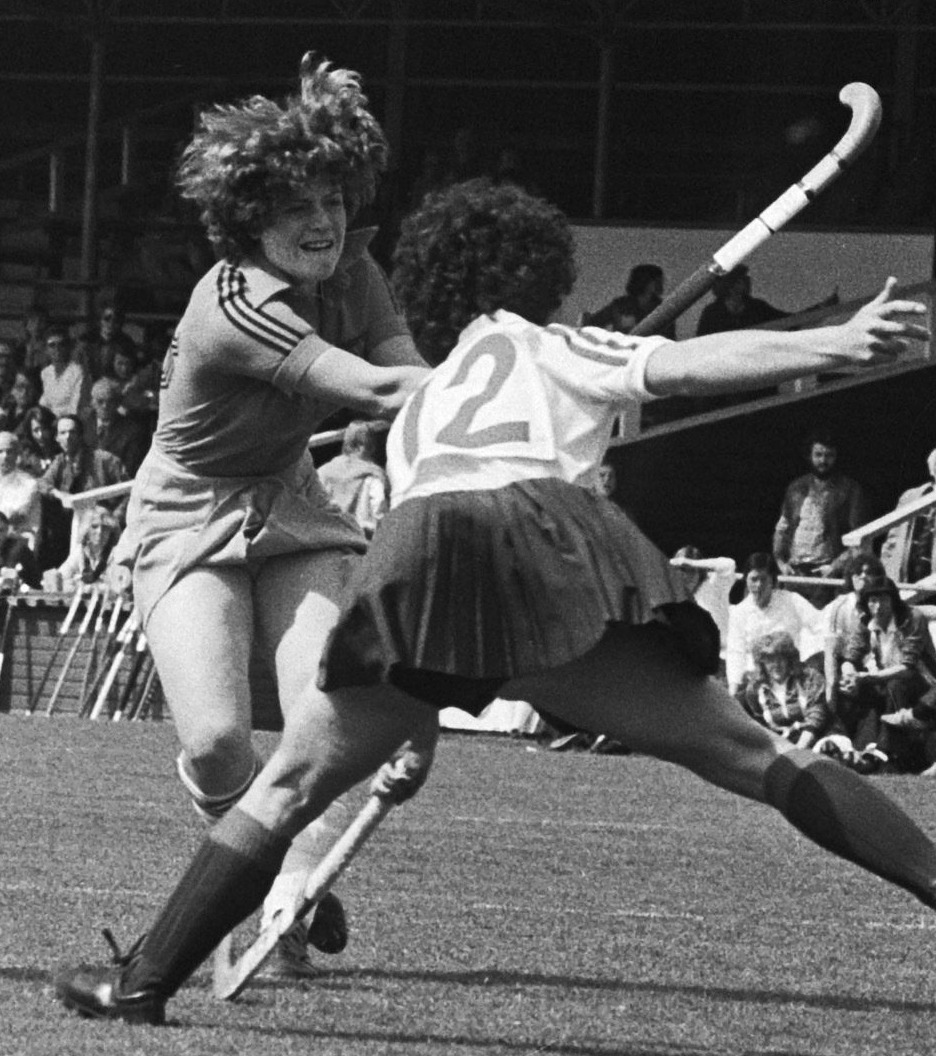
- Fieke Boekhorst in 1978

Personal information
- Born: 18 December 1957 (age 68) Helmond, the Netherlands
- Height: 1.66 m (5 ft 5 in)
- Weight: 80 kg (176 lb)

Sport
- Sport: Field hockey
- Club: EMHC, Eindhoven
Medal record
Representing the Netherlands
Olympic Games
Gold medal – first place	1984 Los Angeles	Team
World Cup
Gold medal – first place	1978 Madrid	Team competition
Silver medal – second place	1981 Buenos Aires	Team
Gold medal – first place	1983 Kuala Lumpur	Team
European Championship
Gold medal – first place	1984 Lille	Team

Josephine Francisca Maria "Fieke" Boekhorst-Van Griensven (born 18 December 1957) is a retired Dutch field hockey player. She won an Olympic gold medal and a European title in 1984, and world titles in 1978 and 1983, but never became a national champion. During her career she played 90 international matches for the Netherlands, in which she scored 106 goals. The defender made her debut for the Dutch on 16 September 1978 in a match against India, and quickly became known for her powerful shots. She retired while preparing for the 1986 World Cup, due to a knee injury sustained during a hockey match, and later worked as a field hockey coach.
