= Jenny McDonald =

New Zealand field hockey player

Jennifer Enid McDonald (née Bint; born 18 July 1949 in Whangārei) is a retired field hockey player from New Zealand, who captained the national team that finished sixth at the 1984 Summer Olympics in Los Angeles.

Born Jennifer Enid Bint, McDonald grew up in the farming locality of Maungakaramea, in Northland. She studied teaching in Auckland, then taught at the primary school in Outram, near Dunedin, where she met her future husband, Rex McDonald.

McDonald played 192 matches for the national hockey team from 1971 to 1985, including 94 tests, and captained the team from 1980 to 1985. She was the only New Zealander selected in a World XI that played the world champion Netherlands in a one-off encounter in Scotland in 1980. She retired from hockey at the age of 53 after breaking her wrist. Later, she became President of the Otago Hockey Association, then chair of Southern Regional Hockey.

In 1996, McDonald was inducted into the New Zealand Sports Hall of Fame. The annual national schoolgirls' hockey tournament is played for the Jenny McDonald Cup. She was awarded life membership of the New Zealand Hockey Federation in 2002.

McDonald retired from teaching in 2014 after being principal of Elmgrove School in Mosgiel, Otago, for 10 years.
