= Laurie Lambert =

Canadian field hockey player

Laurie Lambert (born 18 November 1960) is a Canadian former field hockey player who competed in the 1984 Summer Olympics.
