= Sandra Pisani =

Australian field hockey player (1959–2022)

Sandra Pisani OAM
Personal information
- Born: 23 January 1959 Australia
- Died: 19 April 2022 (aged 63) Adelaide, South Australia
Medal record
Women's field hockey
Representing Australia
Gold medal – first place	1988 Seoul	Team
World Cup
Bronze medal – third place	1983 Kuala Lumpur	Team
Champions Trophy
Silver medal – second place	1987 Amstelveen, Netherlands	Team

Sandra Pisani OAM (23 January 1959 – 19 April 2022) was an Australian field hockey player who played 85 international games for Australia and was the captain from 1985 to 1987.

She competed in the 1984 Summer Olympics and was part of the team that won Australia's first Olympic gold medal at the 1988 Summer Olympics.

She was a National Women's Senior Selector for the Hockeyroos Australia women's national field hockey team from 1993 to 2000 and the Head Selector during the peak of their success when the team won two Olympic gold medals in Field hockey at the 1996 Summer Olympics – Women's tournament and Field hockey at the 2000 Summer Olympics – Women's tournament under coach Ric Charlesworth.

== Personal life ==
Pisani was born on 23 January 1959, and lived in Adelaide, South Australia. She died from cancer on 19 April 2022.

== Field hockey ==
=== Club hockey ===
In 1976, Pisani first played A grade club hockey for Burnside Hockey Club when she was 17 years old. She played in eight (8) winning A grade Premiership teams over 15 years (including four in five years) for Burnside in 1976, 1977, 1979, 1980, 1982, 1985, 1986 and 1990. She won Burnside Hockey Club's Best and Fairest in 1985 and 1987 and received Life Membership of Burnside Hockey Club in 2002.

In 1985 and 1992, she won the Association Medal for South Australia's Best and Fairest Player.

She moved to Port Adelaide in 1991 and spent six years playing and coaching with the club. She coached the team from 1991 to 1994. In two years under Sandy's coaching, Port moved up from seventh to second, and then she led them to a premiership in her third year of coaching there in 1993, being awarded Hockey SA's Coach of the Year the same year.

Later on, she coached the Premier League Woodville Hockey Club for two years.

In 2012, she was a joint winner of the Hockey SA Coach of the Year with Rachel Hampton.

=== State hockey ===
Pisani showed a strong commitment to South Australian hockey, having been a Hockey SA State Selector, State Coach and State Team Manager at various times.

She played for South Australia at senior state level for the South Australian Australian Hockey League team, the Southern Suns for 12 years and was captain for five years. She played from 1978 to 1983, 1985 to 1989 and in 1992.

In 2011, she was a Mentor to the Southern Suns and then became Assistant Coach in 2012 and Team Manager in 2013.

=== International hockey – player ===
Pisani played 85 international games for Australia, making her debut in 1981 at the World Cup in Buenos Aires at 22 years of age. She was the captain from 1985 to 1987.

This is a list of tournaments she played in:

- 1981 America's Cup – USA
- 1981 World Cup, Argentina – 4th place
- 1982 America's Cup – USA
- 1982 Invitation Tournament – NZ
- 1983 World Cup - Malaysia – BRONZE medal
- 1983 European Tour – Holland and Germany
- 1983 Four Nations Tournament – Perth
- 1984 Pre-Olympic Tour – Europe
- 1984 Olympic Games – Los Angeles – 4th place (Australia at the 1984 Summer Olympics)
- 1984 Four Nations Tournament – Melbourne
- 1985 Four Nations Tournament – Holland and England – Captain
- 1985 Test Series - Germany and England – Captain
- 1986 Six Nations International Tournament – Australia- Captain
- 1986 World Cup – Amsterdam – Captain
- 1987 Champions Trophy Amsterdam – SILVER medal
- 1987 Four Nations Tournament – Korea
- 1988 Bicentennial Tournament – Six Nations -Perth
- 1988 European Tour
- 1988 Olympic Games – Seoul 1988 – GOLD medal (Australia at the 1988 Summer Olympics)

=== International hockey - selector and manager ===
From 1993 to 2000, Pisani was a National Women's Senior Selector for the Hockeyroos Australia women's national field hockey team. She was the Head Selector during the peak of their success when the team won two Olympic gold medals in Field hockey at the 1996 Summer Olympics – Women's tournament and Field hockey at the 2000 Summer Olympics – Women's tournament under coach Ric Charlesworth.

She was a National Youth Selector since 2012 – a role where she worked alongside fellow South Australian Craig Victory.

In 2014, she was the Team Manager for the Women's Australia A development tour to China and Japan in August 2014.

== Recognition ==
She was recognised on the South Australian Sports Institute Hockey Honour Roll for her 1988 Olympic gold medal.

As part of the Queen's birthday honours in June 1989, Pisani was awarded the Medal of the Order of Australia (OAM) for service to the sport of hockey.

In the mid-1990s, she was a board member of Hockey SA. In 1995, she was a Council Delegate for the Australian Women's Hockey Association Inc.

In June 2000, she was awarded the Australian Sports Medal with the citation "1988 Olympic Team Member – Convenor of Selection Committee".

In 2003, she was given the Team Sport Australia Award at the Sport Australia Hall of Fame Awards as a member of the gold medal-winning team at the 1988 Summer Olympics. This was the first Olympic Gold ever won by an Australian hockey Team. It was the start of an era of success for Women's hockey in Australia.

She was inducted into the South Australian Sport Hall of Fame in 2015.

She was twice a finalist in the Caltex SA Sports Star of the Year Award.
