= Natella Krasnikova =

Soviet field hockey player

Medal record

Representing the Soviet Union

Women's Field hockey

Olympic Games
| Bronze medal – third place | 1980 Moscow | Team |

Natella Arkhipovna Krasnikova (Russian: Нателла Архиповна Красникова; born 14 October 1953, in Mogocha, Zabaykalsky Krai, Russian SFSR) is a Russian field hockey player and Olympic medalist. She was born in Mogocha. Competing for the Soviet Union, she won a bronze medal at the 1980 Summer Olympics in Moscow.

Krasnikova scored 220 goals for Soviet Union which was a world record for 20 years. She scored 22 goals in just 5 matches in Intercontinental Cup in Buenos Aires in 1985, including a hat-trick in the 3-2 win against Argentina in the final.
