= Lorraine Hillas =

Australian field hockey player

Olympic medal record

Women's field hockey

Representing Australia
Gold medal – first place	1988 Seoul	Team competition

Lorraine Hillas (born 11 December 1961) is an Australian former field hockey player who competed in the 1984 Summer Olympics and in the 1988 Summer Olympics.
