= Sheryl Johnson =

American field hockey player

Personal information
- Full name: Sheryl Ann Johnson
- Born: December 9, 1957 (age 68) Palo Alto, California, U.S.
Medal record
Women's Field Hockey
Representing the United States
Olympic Games
Bronze medal – third place	1984 Los Angeles	Team competition

Sheryl Ann Johnson (born December 9, 1957, in Palo Alto, California) is a former field hockey player and coach from the United States. She grew up in Cupertino, CA, and attended Monta Vista High School. She was a three-sport athlete at the University of California Berkeley, playing field hockey, basketball and softball.

== Olympics ==
She was a member of the United States national team from 1978 to 1991 and was a three time Olympian. She was a member of the 1980 Summer Olympics field hockey team, although she did not compete because the U.S. boycotted the games. She competed in the 1984 Summer Olympics in Los Angeles, California, where she and the U.S. National Team won the bronze medal.

== Pan American Games ==
In 1979, she competed in the Pan American Games where team USA finished second, winning a silver medal. Four years later, when Seoul hosted the Summer Games, Johnson finished in eighth position with Team USA. She was named U.S. Field Hockey Athlete of the Year in 1986, 1987 & 1989.

== World record ==
She long held the Guinness Book of World Records record for the most capped international player, competing in 137 international matches.

== Awards ==
Johnson retired from the national team in 1991. She was inducted into the USFHA Hall of Fame in May 1994. She was one of 461 athletes to receive a Congressional Gold Medal in lieu of competing in the 1980 Olympics. She was honored in the spring of 2001 by the C-society when she was recognized as the only woman in the University of California Berkeley history to earn a Varsity letter in three sports. She coached the Women's field Hockey team at Stanford University 1984–2002, and was an eight-time NorPac coach of the year.
