= Christina Moser =

German field hockey player

Personal information
- Born: Christina Helga Moser; 23 September 1960 (age 65) Berlin, West Germany
- Height: 165 cm (5 ft 5 in)
- Weight: 59 kg (130 lb)

Sport
- Sport: Field hockey
Medal record
Women's field hockey
Representing West Germany
Olympic Games
Silver medal – second place	1984 Los Angeles	Team competition

Christina Helga Göttert (née Moser, born 23 September 1960 in Berlin) is a German former field hockey player who competed in the 1984 Summer Olympics.
