= Beth Anders =

American field hockey player

Personal information
- Full name: Elizabeth Anders
- Born: November 13, 1951 (age 74) Norristown, Pennsylvania, U.S.
Medal record
Women's Field Hockey
Representing the United States
Olympic Games
Bronze medal – third place	1984 Los Angeles	Team competition

Elizabeth Rambo Anders (born November 13, 1951, in Norristown, Pennsylvania) is a former field hockey sweeper from the United States, who was a member of the national team that won the bronze medal at the 1984 Summer Olympics in Los Angeles, California. She attended Plymouth-Whitemarsh High School. After the 1984 Summer Olympics she became the head coach of the USA National Women's Team. She also coached field hockey at Old Dominion University for 30 seasons, retiring in 2012. At Old Dominion she coached more games (704) and achieved more wins (561) and NCAA titles (9) than anyone in Division I history, as well as becoming the first Division I coach to reach 500 victories in field hockey.

While at Old Dominion, Anders led the Lady Monarchs through 27 seasons at the NCAA tournament. She led that team to receive more honors or rewards than any other NCAA team in history. Since 1991, when the Lady Monarchs joined the league, under the tutelage of Anders, they played 17 times in the NCAA Final Four.

She was inducted into the Ursinus College Hall of Fame for Athletics in 1986, the USA Field Hockey Hall of Fame in 1989, the Pennsylvania Sports Hall of Fame in 1998, the National Field Hockey Coaches Association Hall of Fame in 2000, the Philadelphia Sports Hall of Fame in 2007, and Old Dominion's Sports Hall of Fame in 2014.
