= Gaby Appel =

German field hockey player

Personal information
- Full name: Gabriele Marion Appel
- Born: Gabriele Marion Reimann; 17 January 1958 (age 68) Viersen, West Germany
- Height: 154 cm (5 ft 1 in)
- Weight: 49 kg (108 lb)

Sport
- Sport: Field hockey
Medal record
Women's field hockey
Representing West Germany
Olympic Games
Silver medal – second place	1984 Los Angeles	Team competition

Gabriele Marion "Gaby" Reimann (née Appel, born 17 January 1958 in Viersen) is a German former field hockey player who competed in the 1984 Summer Olympics and in the 1988 Summer Olympics.
