= Sandra Le Poole =

Dutch field hockey player (born 1959)

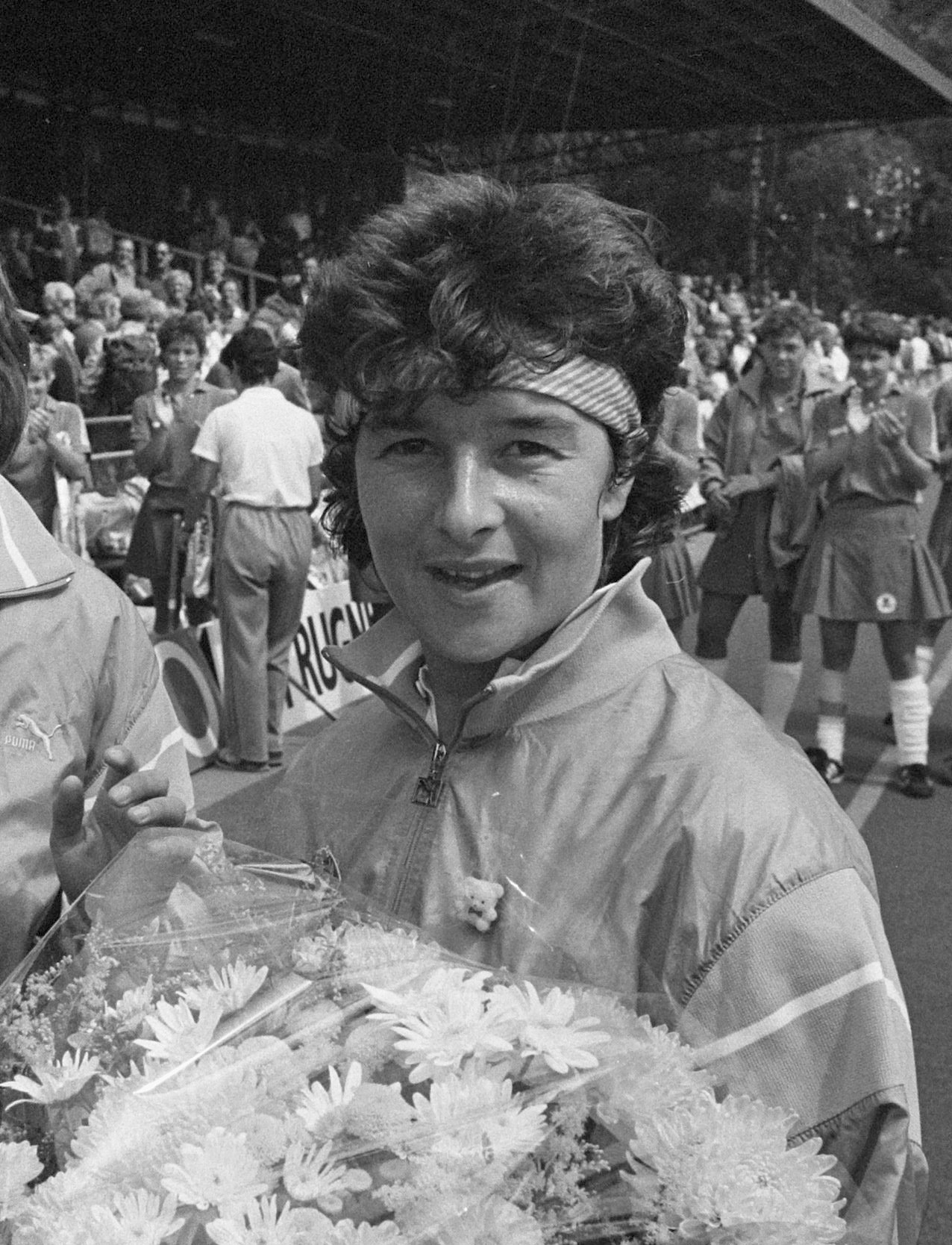
- Sandra Le Poole in 1986 at her 100th international match

Personal information
- Born: 20 October 1959 (age 66) Leiden, the Netherlands
- Height: 1.64 m (5 ft 5 in)
- Weight: 65 kg (143 lb)

Sport
- Sport: Field hockey
- Club: HGC; Den Haag
Medal record
Representing the Netherlands
Olympic Games
| Gold medal – first place | 1984 Los Angeles | Team |

Alexandra ("Sandra") Johanna Le Poole (born 20 October 1959) is a retired field hockey player from the Netherlands. She was part of the Dutch hockey teams that won the 1984 Summer Olympics, world championships in 1978, 1979, 1983 and 1986, and European championships in 1984.

After retirement from competitions she worked as a coach and physiotherapist.
