= Martina Hallmen =

German field hockey player

Personal information
- Full name: Martina Helga Hallmen
- Born: Martina Helga Koch; 20 May 1959 (age 67) Frankfurt, West Germany
- Height: 166 cm (5 ft 5 in)
- Weight: 61 kg (134 lb)

Sport
- Sport: Field hockey
Medal record
Women's field hockey
Representing West Germany
Olympic Games
Silver medal – second place	1984 Los Angeles	Team competition

Martina Helga Hallmen (née Koch, born 20 May 1959 in Frankfurt) is a German former field hockey player who competed in the 1984 Summer Olympics and in the 1988 Summer Olympics.
