= Robyn Leggatt =

Australian hockey player

Personal information
- Nationality: Australian
- Born: 7 May 1957 (age 68)

Sport
- Sport: Field hockey

Robyn Leggatt OAM (7 May 1957) is an Australian field hockey player. She competed in the women's tournament at the 1984 Summer Olympics.

She received the Order of Australia in 2011 and was inducted into the NSW Hockey Hall of Fame in 2007.
