= Susan Watkins (field hockey) =

Australian hockey player

Personal information
- Nationality: Australian
- Born: 1 November 1957 (age 68)

Sport
- Sport: Field hockey

Susan Watkins (born 1 November 1957) is an Australian field hockey player. She competed in the women's tournament at the 1984 Summer Olympics.
