= Mary Clinton =

New Zealand field hockey player

Mary Frances Clinton (born 8 May 1960 in Darfield, New Zealand) is a former female field hockey player from New Zealand, who was a member of the national team that finished sixth at the 1984 Summer Olympics in Los Angeles, California. Eight years later she competed with at the 1992 Summer Olympics in Barcelona, where the team ended up in eight position. She was the first female woman to play more than 100 matches for the national team.
