= Laura Branchaud =

Canadian field hockey player

Laura Branchaud (born 15 February 1960) is a Canadian former field hockey player who competed in the 1984 Summer Olympics and in the 1988 Summer Olympics.

Branchaud made her debut for Canada in 1979. When she was selected for the 1981 Women's Hockey World Cup at the age of 20, she was described by Janet Beverly, the technical director of the Canada team as "about five foot...quick and has a good acceleration", "gaining a reputation for scoring goals at critical times". She scored two goals against Netherlands in February 1981 helping Canada finish third in the European Indoor Championships.
