= Julene Sunderland =

Australian hockey player

Personal information
- Nationality: Australian
- Born: 8 June 1959 (age 66)

Sport
- Sport: Field hockey

Julene Sunderland (born 8 June 1959) is an Australian field hockey player. She competed in the women's tournament at the 1984 Summer Olympics.
