= Darlene Stoyka =

Canadian field hockey player

Darlene Stoyka (born 30 November 1956) is a Canadian former field hockey player who competed in the 1984 Summer Olympics.
