= Sheila Forshaw =

Canadian field hockey player

Sheila Forshaw (born 28 June 1958 in Toronto) is a Canadian former field hockey player who competed in the 1984 Summer Olympics and in the 1988 Summer Olympics.
