= Field hockey at the 1988 Summer Olympics – Women's team squads =

List of hockey players

The following is the list of squads that took place in the women's field hockey tournament at the 1988 Summer Olympics.

== Argentina ==
The following players represented Argentina:

- Laura Mulhall
- María Colombo
- Marisa López
- María Alejandra Tucat
- Victoria Carbó
- Marcela Richezza
- Gabriela Liz
- Gabriela Sánchez
- Moira Brinnand
- Marcela Hussey
- Alejandra Palma
- María Bengochea
- Alina Vergara
- María Gabriela Pazos
- Andrea Fioroni

== Australia ==
The following players represented Australia:

- Kathleen Partridge
- Elspeth Clement
- Liane Tooth
- Loretta Dorman
- Lorraine Hillas
- Michelle Hager
- Sandra Pisani
- Debbie Bowman-Sullivan
- Lee Capes
- Kim Small
- Sally Carbon
- Jackie Pereira
- Tracey Belbin
- Rechelle Hawkes
- Sharon Buchanan-Patmore
- Maree Fish

== Canada ==
The following players represented Canada:

- Sharon Bayes
- Wendy Baker
- Deb Covey
- Lisa Lyn
- Laura Branchaud
- Sandra Levy
- Kathryn Johnson
- Shona Schleppe
- Mary Conn
- Liz Czenczek
- Sheila Forshaw
- Nancy Charlton
- Sara Ballantyne
- Sharon Creelman

== Great Britain ==
The following players represented Great Britain:

- Jill Atkins
- Wendy Banks
- Gillian Brown
- Karen Brown
- Mary Nevill
- Julie Cook
- Vicky Dixon
- Wendy Fraser
- Barbara Hambly
- Caroline Jordan
- Violet McBride
- Moira MacLeod
- Caroline Brewer
- Jane Sixsmith
- Kate Parker
- Alison Ramsay

== Netherlands ==
The following players represented the Netherlands:

- Det de Beus
- Yvonne Buter
- Willemien Aardenburg
- Laurien Willemse
- Marjolein Bolhuis-Eijsvogel
- Lisanne Lejeune
- Carina Benninga
- Annemieke Fokke
- Ingrid Wolff
- Marieke van Doorn
- Sophie von Weiler
- Aletta van Manen
- Noor Holsboer
- Helen van der Ben
- Martine Ohr
- Anneloes Nieuwenhuizen

== South Korea ==
The following players represented South Korea:

- Kim Mi-sun
- Han Ok-kyung
- Chang Eun-jung
- Han Gum-shil
- Choi Choon-ok
- Kim Sun-deok
- Chung Sang-hyun
- Jin Won-sim
- Hwang Keum-sook
- Cho Ki-hyang
- Seo Kwang-mi
- Park Soon-ja
- Kim Yeong-suk
- Seo Hyo-sun
- Lim Kye-sook
- Chung Eun-kyung

== United States ==
The following players represented the United States:

- Patty Shea
- Yogi Hightower
- Mary Koboldt
- Marcia Pankratz
- Cheryl Van Kuren
- Diane Bracalente
- Beth Beglin
- Marcy Place-von Schottenstein
- Sandy Vander-Heyden
- Tracey Fuchs
- Sheryl Johnson
- Sandra Costigan
- Christy Morgan
- Barbara Marois
- Megan Donnelly
- Donna Lee

== West Germany ==
The following players represented West Germany:

- Susi Schmid
- Carola Hoffmann
- Heike Gehrmann
- Dagmar Breiken-Bremer
- Gaby Uhlenbruck
- Viola Grahl
- Bettina Blumenberg
- Gaby Appel
- Martina Koch-Hallmen
- Christine Ferneck
- Silke Wehrmeister
- Caren Jungjohann
- Eva Hegener
- Susie Wollschläger
- Gabriela Schöwe
