= 1987 Women's Hockey Champions Trophy =

Field hockey tournament

Tournament details
- Host country: Netherlands
- City: Amstelveen
- Dates: 21–28 June
- Teams: 6
- Venue: Wagener Stadium

Final positions
- Champions: Netherlands (1st title)
- Runner-up: Australia
- Third place: South Korea

Tournament statistics
- Matches played: 15
- Goals scored: 65 (4.33 per match)
- Top scorer: (South Korea) Lim Kye-Sook (8 goals)

The 1987 Women's Hockey Champions Trophy was the first edition of the Hockey Champions Trophy for women. The tournament was held from 21 to 28 June 1987, in Amstelveen, Netherlands.

Netherlands won the tournament, becoming the inaugural champions of the Champions Trophy. Australia and South Korea finished in second and third place, respectively.

== Officials ==
The following umpires were appointed by the FIH to officiate the tournament:

- Jane Hadfield (AUS)
- Christiane Asselman (BEL)
- Margaret Lanning (CAN)
- Jane Robertson (GBR)
- Laure Lawton (FRA)
- Brigit de Vries (NED)
- Yolande Mohlmann (NED)
- Corinne Pritchard (NZL)
- Solobrar Hernández (ESP)

== Participating nations ==
Australia

Head Coach: Brian Glencross

1. Kathleen Partridge (GK)
2. Elspeth Clement
3. Liane Tooth
4. Tracey Belbin
5. Kerrie Richards
6. Michelle Capes
7. Sandra Pisani
8. Deborah Bowman (c)
9. Lee Capes
10. Kim Small
11. Sharon Buchanan
12. Jacqueline Pereira
13. Loretta Dorman
14. Rechelle Hawkes
15. Fiona Simpson
16. Maree Fish (GK)
Canada

Head Coach: Marina van der Merwe

1. Sharon Bayes (GK)
2. Wendy Baker (GK)
3. Deb Covey
4. Lisa Lyn
5. Laura Branchaud
6. Sandra Levy
7. Kathryn MacDougal
8. Sara Ballantyne
9. Danielle Audet
10. Shona Schleppe
11. Michelle Conn
12. Liz Czenczek
13. Maria Cuncannon
14. Nancy Charlton (c)
15. Jody Blaxland
16. Sharon Creelman
Great Britain

Head Coach: Dennis Hay

1. Jill Atkins
2. Wendy Banks (GK)
3. Gill Brown
4. Karen Brown
5. Mary Nevill
6. Julie Cook (GK)
7. Victoria Dixon
8. Wendy Fraser
9. Barbara Hambly (c)
10. Caroline Jordan
11. Violet McBride
12. Moira McLeod
13. Caroline Rule
14. Gillian Messenger
15. Kate Parker
16. Alison Ramsay
Netherlands

Head Coach: Gijs van Heumen

1. Det de Beus (GK)
2. Yvonne Buter (GK)
3. Terry Sibbing
4. Laurien Willemse
5. Marjolein Eijsvogel (c)
6. Lisanne Lejeune
7. Carina Benninga
8. Marjolein de Leeuw
9. Maryse Abendanon
10. Marieke van Doorn
11. Sophie von Weiler
12. Aletta van Manen
13. Noor Holsboer
14. Helen van der Ben
15. Martine Ohr
16. Anneloes Nieuwenhuizen
New Zealand

Head Coach: Pat Barwick

1. Leanne Rogers (GK)
2. Marie Corcoran (GK)
3. Mary Clinton (c)
4. Robyn McDonald
5. Helen Littleworth
6. Kathy Paterson
7. Trudy Kilkolly
8. Cindy Reriti
9. Robyn Toomey
10. Christine Arthur
11. Anna Symes
12. Susan Furmage
13. Jan Martin
14. Maree Flannery
15. Judith Soper
16. Donna Flannery
South Korea

Head Coach: You Young-Chae

1. Kim Mi-Sun (GK)
2. Han Ok-Kyung
3. Kim Mi-Ja
4. Choi Young-ja
5. Choi Choon-Ok
6. Kim Soon-Deok
7. Chung Sang-Hyun (c)
8. Jin Won-Sim
9. Hwang Keum-Sook
10. Cho Ki-Hyang
11. Seo Kwang-Mi
12. Park Soon-Ja
13. Kim Young-sook
14. Seo Hyo-Sun
15. Lim Kye-Sook
16. Chung Eun-Kyung (GK)

== Results ==
=== Pool standings ===
Pos	Team	Pld	W	D	L	GF	GA	GD	Pts
1st place, gold medalist(s)	Netherlands	5	5	0	0	21	3	+18	10
2nd place, silver medalist(s)	Australia	5	3	1	1	15	6	+9	7
3rd place, bronze medalist(s)	South Korea	5	2	1	2	14	10	+4	5
4	Canada	5	2	1	2	8	9	−1	5
5	Great Britain	5	1	1	3	6	7	−1	3
6	New Zealand	5	0	0	5	1	30	−29	0

Source: FIH

=== Matches ===
21 June 1987
11:00

New Zealand	0–8	Australia
	Report	Pereira 5', 33', 60'; Small 28', 46', 69'; Bowman 55'; Capes 64'

Umpires:
Yolande Mohlmann (NED)
Christiane Asselman (BEL)

21 June 1987
13:00

South Korea	4–0	Canada
Chung S. 12'; Lim 43', 55'; Choi C. 63'	Report

Umpires:
Brigit de Vries (NED)
Jane Hadfield (AUS)

21 June 1987
15:00

Netherlands	4–0	Great Britain
Lejeune 23', 55'; Eijsvogel 32'; Sibbing 70'	Report

Umpires:
Margaret Lanning (CAN)
Corinne Pritchard (NZL)

22 June 1987
13:00

New Zealand	0–5	Great Britain
	Report	Brown 6'; McLeod 24', 45'; Dixon 26'; Jordan 56'

Umpires:
Brigit de Vries (NED)
Margaret Lanning (CAN)

22 June 1987
15:00

Netherlands	4–1	Canada
Eijsvogel 11', 70'; Benninga 12'; Von Weiler 58'	Report	Ballantyne 40'

Umpires:
Corinne Pritchard (NZL)
Jane Robertson (GBR)

23 June 1987
15:00

South Korea	1–3	Australia
Lim 56'	Report	Pereira 35', 50'; Small 53'

Umpires:
Yolande Mohlmann (NED)
Margaret Lanning (CAN)

24 June 1987
15:00

New Zealand	0–5	Canada
	Report	Levy 11'; Lyn 28', 44', 56'; Charlton 70'

Umpires:
Jane Hadfield (AUS)
Laure Lawton (FRA)

24 June 1987
17:00

Great Britain	0–1	Australia
	Report	Pereira 21'

Umpires:
Corinne Pritchard (NZL)
Christiane Asselman (BEL)

24 June 1987
19:00

Netherlands	5–0	South Korea
Van Doorn 6'; Lejeune 48'; Von Weiler 49'; Eijsvogel 51', 68'	Report

Umpires:
Solobrar Hernández (ESP)
Jane Robertson (GBR)

25 June 1987
17:00

Netherlands	4–0	New Zealand
Van Doorn 33', 55'; Ohr 41'; Van der Ben 65'	Report

Umpires:
Jane Hadfield (AUS)
Christiane Asselman (BEL)

26 June 1987
09:00

South Korea	1–1	Great Britain
Lim 61'	Report	Brown 65'

Umpires:
Margaret Lanning (CAN)
Corinne Pritchard (NZL)

26 June 1987
11:00

Canada	1–1	Australia
Levy 58'	Report	Richards 37'

Umpires:
Brigit de Vries (NED)
Solobrar Hernández (ESP)

27 June 1987
11:00

New Zealand	1–8	South Korea
Arthur 19'	Report	Jin 6', 16'; Hwang 22', 32'; Lim 30', 46', 47', 60'

Umpires:
Yolande Mohlmann (NED)
Laure Lawton (FRA)

27 June 1987
13:00

Great Britain	0–1	Canada
	Report	Conn 68'

Umpires:
Brigit de Vries (NED)
Jane Hadfield (AUS)

27 June 1987
15:00

Netherlands	4–2	Australia
Von Weller 23'; Lejeune 29', 50'; Van der Ben 59'	Report	Clement 46'; Pereira 47'

Umpires:
Solobrar Hernández (ESP)
Jane Robertson (GBR)

== Statistics ==
=== Final standings ===
1. Netherlands
2. Australia
3. South Korea
4. Canada
5. Great Britain
6. New Zealand

=== Goalscorers ===
There were 65 goals scored in 15 matches, for an average of 4.33 goals per match.

8 goals

- (South Korea) Lim Kye-Sook

7 goals

- (Australia) Jacqui Pereira

5 goals

- (Netherlands) Marjolein Eijsvogel
- (Netherlands) Lisanne Lejeune

4 goals

- (Australia) Kim Small

3 goals

- (Canada) Lisa Lyn
- (Netherlands) Marieke van Doorn
- (Netherlands) Sophie von Weiler

2 goals

- (Canada) Sandra Levy
- (United Kingdom) Karen Brown
- (United Kingdom) Moira McLeod
- (Netherlands) Helen van der Ben
- (South Korea) Hwang Keum-Sook
- (South Korea) Jin Won-Sim

1 goal

- (Australia) Debbie Bowman
- (Australia) Lee Capes
- (Australia) Elspeth Clement
- (Australia) Kerrie Richards
- (Canada) Sara Ballantyne
- (Canada) Nancy Charlton
- (Canada) Michelle Conn
- (United Kingdom) Vickey Dixon
- (United Kingdom) Caroline Jordan
- (Netherlands) Carina Benninga
- (Netherlands) Martine Ohr
- (Netherlands) Terry Sibbing
- (New Zealand) Christine Arthur
- (South Korea) Choi Choon-Ok
- (South Korea) Chung Sang-Hyun

Source: FIH
