= 1989 Women's Hockey Champions Trophy =

Tournament details
- Host country: West Germany
- City: Frankfurt
- Dates: 3–10 September
- Teams: 6

Final positions
- Champions: South Korea (1st title)
- Runner-up: Australia
- Third place: West Germany

Tournament statistics
- Matches played: 15
- Goals scored: 46 (3.07 per match)
- Top scorer: (Australia) Jackie Pereira (7 goals)

The 1989 Women's Champions Trophy is the 2nd edition of Hockey Champions Trophy for women. It was held from September 3–10, 1989 in Frankfurt, West Germany.

== Squads ==
Australia
1. Maree Fish (GK)
2. Christine Dobson
3. Juliet Haslam
4. Vanessa Barnes
5. Angela Kaaks (GK)
6. Michelle Capes
7. Alison Peek
8. Lisa Powell
9. Lee Capes
10. Kim Small
11. Sally Carbon
12. Jackie Pereira
13. Tracey Belbin
14. Rechelle Hawkes
15. Sharon Patmore (c)
16. Kim Rayner
Canada
1. Deb Whitten (GK)
2. Tina Farrar
3. Deb Covey
4. Sue Bond
5. Carmen Kirkness
6. Sandra Levy
7. Rochelle Low
8. Melanie Slade
9. Joan Robere
10. Joel Brough
11. Michelle Conn
12. Laurelee Kopeck
13. Bernie Casey
14. Milena Gaiga
15. Sara Ballantyne
16. Sharon Creelman (c)
Great Britain
1. Jill Atkins
2. Valerie Hallam (GK)
3. Gill Brown
4. Karen Brown
5. Mary Nevill (c)
6. Julie Elms (GK)
7. Vickey Dixon
8. Wendy Fraser
9. Sandy Lister
10. Gill Messenger
11. Tracy Fry
12. Watkin Lynda
13. Catherine Sterling
14. Jane Sixsmith
15. Kate Parker
16. Alison Ramsay
Netherlands
1. Carina Bleeker (GK)
2. Jacqueline Toxopeus (GK)
3. Willemijn Duyster
4. Annemieke Fokke
5. Terry Sibbing
6. Mieketine Wouters
7. Caroline Leenders
8. Daniëlle Koenen
9. Ingrid Wolff
10. Anneloes Nieuwenhuizen (c)
11. Suzan van der Wielen
12. Simone van Haarlem
13. Ingrid Appels
14. Helen Lejuene
15. Florentine Steenberghe
16. Wietske de Ruiter
South Korea
1. You Jae-sook (GK)
2. Han Gum-shil
3. Chang Eun-jung
4. Hee Kim-kuk
5. Kim Soon-duk
6. Son Jeong-im
7. Baek Beon-a
8. Kim Hyun
9. Soon Cho-kyu
10. Jin Won-sim
11. Kwon Chang-sook
12. Yang Hea-sook
13. Kim Young-sook
14. Young Ku-mun
15. Lim Kye-sook (c)
16. Kim Hyung-soon
West Germany
1. Susie Wollschläger (c, GK)
2. Bianca Weiß (GK)
3. Caren Jungjohann
4. Anke Wild
5. Eva Hagenbäumer
6. Kristina Peters
7. Irina Kuhnt
8. Tanja Dickenscheid
9. Heike Gehrmann
10. Melanie Cremer
11. Philippa Suxdorf
12. Britta Becker
13. Christine Ferneck
14. Franziska Hentschel
15. Dana Schurmann
16. Katrin Kauschke

== Results ==
=== Pool standings ===
Pos	Team	Pld	W	D	L	GF	GA	GD	Pts
1st place, gold medalist(s)	South Korea	5	4	1	0	11	3	+8	9
2nd place, silver medalist(s)	Australia	5	3	2	0	14	10	+4	8
3rd place, bronze medalist(s)	West Germany	5	2	2	1	7	3	+4	6
4	Great Britain	5	1	1	3	7	11	−4	3
5	Netherlands	5	0	2	3	4	9	−5	2
6	Canada	5	0	2	3	3	10	−7	2

Source: FIH

=== Matches ===
3 September 1989
10:00

Netherlands	0–0	Canada
	Report

Umpires:

3 September 1989
12:30

South Korea	1–0	West Germany
Lim 21'	Report

Umpires:

3 September 1989
14:30

Australia	3–2	Great Britain
Pereira 18', 22'; Hawkes 67'	Report	K. Brown 24'; Nevill 44'

Umpires:

4 September 1989
13:30

Netherlands	2–3	Great Britain
Lejeune 40'; Van der Wielen 61'	Report	K. Brown 5'; Parker 52'; Sixsmith 58'

Umpires:

4 September 1989
15:10

Canada	0–3	West Germany
	Report	Jungjohann 38'; Ferneck 46'; Becker 66'

Umpires:

4 September 1989
17:30

Australia	3–3	South Korea
Pereira 3'; Patmore 24'; Small 51'	Report	Lim 35', 63'; Chang 64'

Umpires:

6 September 1989
15:30

Canada	2–2	Great Britain
Conn 46'; Covey 52'	Report	Dixon 9'; K. Brown 25'

Umpires:

6 September 1989
17:30

Netherlands	0–2	South Korea
	Report	Chang 5', 65'

Umpires:

7 September 1989
15:30

Australia	2–2	West Germany
Capes 43'; Pereira 70'	Report	Hentschel 10'; Jungjohann 46'

Umpires:

9 September 1989
11:00

Netherlands	2–4	Australia
Lejeune 17', 21'	Report	Hawkes 50'; Small 52'; Pereira 58', 62'

Umpires:

9 September 1989
13:00

Canada	0–3	South Korea
	Report	Jin 30'; Lim 61', 64'

Umpires:

9 September 1989
15:00

Great Britain	0–2	West Germany
	Report	Hentschel 13'; Jungjohann 16'

Umpires:

10 September 1989
11:00

Australia	2–1	Canada
Pereira 22'; Small 25'	Report	Low 70'

Umpires:

10 September 1989
13:00

Great Britain	0–2	South Korea
	Report	Chang 28'; Lim 64'

Umpires:

10 September 1989
15:00

Netherlands	0–0	West Germany
	Report

Umpires:

== Statistics ==
=== Final standings ===
1. South Korea
2. Australia
3. West Germany
4. Great Britain
5. Netherlands
6. Canada

=== Goalscorers ===
There were 46 goals scored in 15 matches, for an average of 3.07 goals per match.

7 goals

- (Australia) Jacqui Pereira

6 goals

- (South Korea) Lim Kye-Sook

4 goals

- (South Korea) Chang Eun-Jung

3 goals

- (Australia) Kim Small
- (United Kingdom) Karen Brown
- (Netherlands) Helen Lejeune
- (West Germany) Caren Jungjohann

2 goals

- (Australia) Rechelle Hawkes
- (West Germany) Franziska Hentschel

1 goal

- (Australia) Lee Capes
- (Australia) Sharon Patmore
- (Canada) Michelle Conn
- (Canada) Deb Covey
- (Canada) Rochelle Low
- (United Kingdom) Vickey Dixon
- (United Kingdom) Mary Nevill
- (United Kingdom) Kate Parker
- (United Kingdom) Jane Sixsmith
- (Netherlands) Suzan van der Wielen
- (South Korea) Jin Won-Sim
- (West Germany) Britta Becker
- (West Germany) Christine Ferneck

Source: FIH
