= Field hockey at the 1988 Summer Olympics – Women's tournament =

Women's field hockey at the 1988 Summer Olympics
Women's field hockey at the Games of XXIV Olympiad

Tournament details
- Host country: South Korea
- City: Seoul
- Dates: 21–30 September
- Teams: 8 (from 4 confederations)
- Venue: Seongnam Stadium

Final positions
- Champions: Australia (1st title)
- Runner-up: South Korea
- Third place: Netherlands

Tournament statistics
- Matches played: 20
- Goals scored: 72 (3.6 per match)
- Top scorer: (Netherlands) Lisanne Lejeune (8 goals)

The women's field hockey tournament at the 1988 Summer Olympics was the 3rd edition of the field hockey event for women at the Summer Olympic Games. It was held over a ten-day period beginning on 21 September, and culminating with the medal finals on 30 September. All games were played at the Seongnam Stadium in Seoul, South Korea.

Australia won the gold medal for the first time after defeating South Korea 2–0 in the final. Netherlands won the bronze medal by defeating Great Britain 3–1.

== Results ==
=== Preliminary round ===
==== Group A ====
Pos	Team	Pld	W	D	L	GF	GA	GD	Pts	Qualification
1	Netherlands	3	3	0	0	9	2	+7	6	Semi-finals
2	Great Britain	3	1	1	1	4	7	−3	3	Semi-finals
3	Argentina	3	1	0	2	2	3	−1	2	5th–8th place classification
4	United States	3	0	1	2	4	7	−3	1	5th–8th place classification

Source: FIH

21 September 1988
09:00

Argentina	0–1	Great Britain
	Report	MacLeod 32'

Umpires:
Christianne Asselman (BEL)
Margaret Lanning (CAN)

21 September 1988
13:30

Netherlands	3–1	United States
H. Lejeune 29'; Von Weiler 34'; L. Lejeune 68'	Report	Johnson 44'

Umpires:
Dominique Ache (BEL)
R Tong (RSA)

23 September 1988
10:45

Netherlands	5–1	Great Britain
L. Lejeune 6', 20', 31', 39'; Von Weiler 66'	Report	Dixon 34'

Umpires:
Dominique Ache (BEL)
Salobrar Hernandez (ESP)

23 September 1988
15:15

Argentina	2–1	United States
Colombo 11'; Garbo 36'	Report	Donnelly 61'

Umpires:
Dominique Ache (BEL)
Naomi Kato (JPN)

25 September 1988
09:00

United States	2–2	Great Britain
Morgan 37'; Johnson 60'	Report	Dixon 32'; Parker 51'

Umpires:
Jan Hadfield (AUS)
Margaret Lanning (CAN)

25 September 1988
13:30

Netherlands	1–0	Argentina
H. Lejeune 19'	Report

Umpires:
Dominique Ache (BEL)
Naomi Kato (JPN)

==== Group B ====
Pos	Team	Pld	W	D	L	GF	GA	GD	Pts	Qualification
1	South Korea	3	2	1	0	12	7	+5	5	Semi-finals
2	Australia	3	1	2	0	7	6	+1	4	Semi-finals
3	West Germany	3	1	0	2	3	6	−3	2	5th–8th place classification
4	Canada	3	0	1	2	3	6	−3	1	5th–8th place classification

Source: FIH

21 September 1988
10:45

South Korea	4–1	West Germany
Lim 3', 35+'; Chung S. 61'; Seo K. 70+'	Report	Gehrmann 13'

Umpires:
Salobrar Hernandez (ESP)
Pauline Bullock (GBR)

21 September 1988
15:15

Australia	1–1	Canada
Bowman 50'	Report	Forshaw 12'

Umpires:
A Poelmans (NED)
Jean Robertson (GBR)

23 September 1988
09:00

Australia	1–0	West Germany
Bowman 68'	Report

Umpires:
Pauline Bullock (GBR)
Jean Robertson (GBR)

23 September 1988
13:30

South Korea	3–1	Canada
Park 25', 26'; Seo H. 70+'	Report	Johnson 28'

Umpires:
Laura Crespo (ARG)
Jolanda Mohlmann (GBR)

25 September 1988
10:45

Canada	1–2	West Germany
Lyn 49'	Report	Blumenberg 26'; Jungjohann 51'

Umpires:
Laura Crespo (ARG)
A Poelmans (NED)

25 September 1988
15:15

Australia	5–5	South Korea
Pereira 6', 32', 34'; Bowman 24'; Clement 64'	Report	Kim Y. 23'; Lim 28', 31', 45'; Chung S. 44'

Umpires:
Jolanda Mohlman (NED)
R Tong (RSA)

=== Fifth to eighth place classification ===
Cross-overs
27 September
United States	1
West Germany	2
27 September
Argentina	1
Canada (a.e.t)	2

Fifth place
29 September
West Germany	4
Canada	2
Seventh place
29 September
United States	1
Argentina (a.e.t)	3

==== Cross-overs ====
27 September 1988
09:00

United States	1–2	West Germany
Donnelly 19'	Report	Wollschläger 41'; Blumenberg 49'

Umpires:
Jolanda Mohlmann (NED)
Naomi Kato (JPN)

27 September 1988
11:00

Argentina	1–2 (a.e.t.)	Canada
Palma 67'	Report	Forshaw 33'; Creelman 85'

Umpires:
Jean Robertson (GBR)
Jan Hadfield (AUS)

==== Seventh and eighth place ====
29 September 1988
11:00

United States	1–3 (a.e.t.)	Argentina
Morgan 41'	Report	Minnand 47'; Hussey 82'; Palma 84'

Umpires:
Margaret Lanning (CAN)
A Poelmans (NED)

==== Fifth and sixth place ====
29 September 1988
09:00

West Germany	4–2	Canada
Blumenberg 14', 59', 64'; Schmid 57'	Report	Forshaw 18', 52'

Umpires:
Dominique Ache (BEL)
Jean Robertson (GBR)

=== Medal round ===
Semi-finals
27 September
Netherlands	2
Australia	3
27 September
South Korea	1
Great Britain	0

Gold medal match
30 September
Australia	2
South Korea	0
Bronze medal match
30 September
Netherlands	3
Great Britain	1

==== Semi-finals ====
27 September 1988
13:00

Netherlands	2–3	Australia
L. Lejeune 16'; Bolhuis 61'	Report	Tooth 3'; Patmore 48', 56'

Umpires:
Christianne Asselman (BEL)
Salobrar Hernandez (ESP)

27 September 1988
15:15

South Korea	1–0	Great Britain
Seo H. 18'	Report

Umpires:
Laura Crespo (ARG)
R Tong (RSA)

==== Bronze medal match ====
30 September 1988
13:00

Netherlands	3–1	Great Britain
Bolhuis 6'; L. Lejeune 21', 34'	Report	Nevill 9'

Umpires:
Laura Crespo (ARG)
R Tong (RSA)

==== Gold medal match ====
30 September 1988
15:15

Australia	2–0	South Korea
Bowman 41'; Capes 57'	Report

Umpires:
Salobrar Hernandez (ESP)
Jolanda Mohlmann (NED)

== Final ranking ==
As per statistical convention in field hockey, matches decided in extra time are counted as wins and losses, while matches decided by penalty shoot-outs are counted as draws.

Pos	Team	Pld	W	D	L	GF	GA	GD	Pts	Final result
1st place, gold medalist(s)	Australia	5	3	2	0	12	8	+4	8	Gold Medal
2nd place, silver medalist(s)	South Korea	5	3	1	1	13	9	+4	7	Silver Medal
3rd place, bronze medalist(s)	Netherlands	5	4	0	1	14	6	+8	8	Bronze Medal
4	Great Britain	5	1	1	3	5	12	−7	3	Fourth place
5	West Germany	5	3	0	2	9	9	0	6	Eliminated in group stage
6	Canada	5	1	1	3	7	11	−4	3	Eliminated in group stage
7	Argentina	5	2	0	3	6	6	0	4	Eliminated in group stage
8	United States	5	0	1	4	6	12	−6	1	Eliminated in group stage

Source: FIH

== Goalscorers ==
There were 72 goals scored in 20 matches, for an average of 3.6 goals per match.

8 goals

- (Netherlands) Lisanne Lejeune

5 goals

- (South Korea) Lim Kye-Sook
- (West Germany) Bettina Blumenberg

4 goals

- (Australia) Deborah Bowman
- (Canada) Sheila Forshaw

3 goals

- (Australia) Jacqueline Pereira

2 goals

- (Argentina) Alejandra Palma
- (Australia) Sharon Patmore
- (United Kingdom) Victoria Dixon
- (Netherlands) Marjolein Bolhuis
- (Netherlands) Helen Lejeune
- (Netherlands) Sophie von Weiler
- (South Korea) Seo Hyo-Sun
- (South Korea) Chung Sang-Hyun
- (South Korea) Park Soon-Ja
- (United States) Megan Donnelly
- (United States) Sheryl Johnson
- (United States) Christine Morgan

1 goal

- (Argentina) María Colombo
- (Argentina) Victoria Garbó
- (Argentina) Marcela Hussey
- (Argentina) Moira Minnand
- (Australia) Lee Capes
- (Australia) Elspeth Clement
- (Australia) Liane Tooth
- (Canada) Sharon Creelman
- (Canada) Kathryn Johnson
- (Canada) Lisa Lyn
- (United Kingdom) Moira MacLeod
- (United Kingdom) Mary Nevill
- (United Kingdom) Kate Parker
- (South Korea) Seo Kwang-Mi
- (South Korea) Kim Young-Sook
- (West Germany) Heike Gehrmann
- (West Germany) Caren Jungjohann
- (West Germany) Susanne Schmid
- (West Germany) Susanne Wollschläger
