= Field hockey at the 1988 Summer Olympics =

Field hockey at the Games of the XXIV Olympiad
- Venue: Seongnam Stadium
- Dates: 18 September – 1 October 1988
- No. of events: 2
- Teams: 20

Field hockey at the 1988 Summer Olympics in Seoul took place from 18 September to 1 October 1988 at the Seongnam Stadium in Seongnam. Twenty teams (twelve for men and eight for women) competed in the tournament.

== Men's tournament ==
=== Preliminary round ===
==== Group A ====
Pos	Team	Pld	W	D	L	GF	GA	GD	Pts	Qualification
1	Australia	5	5	0	0	19	3	+16	10	Semi-finals
2	Netherlands	5	3	1	1	12	6	+6	7	Semi-finals
3	Pakistan	5	3	0	2	15	8	+7	6	5–8th place semi-finals
4	Argentina	5	2	0	3	8	12	−4	4	5–8th place semi-finals
5	Spain	5	1	1	3	6	10	−4	3	9–12th place semi-finals
6	Kenya	5	0	0	5	5	26	−21	0	9–12th place semi-finals

Source: FIH

==== Group B ====
Pos	Team	Pld	W	D	L	GF	GA	GD	Pts	Qualification
1	West Germany	5	4	1	0	13	3	+10	9	Semi-finals
2	Great Britain	5	3	1	1	12	5	+7	7	Semi-finals
3	India	5	2	1	2	9	7	+2	5	5–8th place semi-finals
4	Soviet Union	5	2	1	2	5	10	−5	5	5–8th place semi-finals
5	South Korea (H)	5	0	2	3	5	10	−5	2	9–12th place semi-finals
6	Canada	5	0	2	3	3	12	−9	2	9–12th place semi-finals

Source: FIH
(H) Hosts

=== Medal round ===
Semi-finals
28 September
West Germany	2
Netherlands	1
28 September
Australia	2
Great Britain	3

Gold medal match
1 October
West Germany	1
Great Britain	3
Bronze medal match
1 October
Australia	1
Netherlands	2

=== Final standings ===
1. Great Britain
2. West Germany
3. Netherlands
4. Australia
5. Pakistan
6. India
7. Soviet Union
8. Argentina
9. Spain
10. South Korea
11. Canada
12. Kenya

== Women's tournament ==
=== Preliminary round ===
==== Group A ====
Pos	Team	Pld	W	D	L	GF	GA	GD	Pts	Qualification
1	Netherlands	3	3	0	0	9	2	+7	6	Semi-finals
2	Great Britain	3	1	1	1	4	7	−3	3	Semi-finals
3	Argentina	3	1	0	2	2	3	−1	2	5th–8th place classification
4	United States	3	0	1	2	4	7	−3	1	5th–8th place classification

Source: FIH

==== Group B ====
Pos	Team	Pld	W	D	L	GF	GA	GD	Pts	Qualification
1	South Korea	3	2	1	0	12	7	+5	5	Semi-finals
2	Australia	3	1	2	0	7	6	+1	4	Semi-finals
3	West Germany	3	1	0	2	3	6	−3	2	5th–8th place classification
4	Canada	3	0	1	2	3	6	−3	1	5th–8th place classification

Source: FIH

=== Medal round ===
Semi-finals
27 September
Netherlands	2
Australia	3
27 September
South Korea	1
Great Britain	0

Gold medal match
30 September
Australia	2
South Korea	0
Bronze medal match
30 September
Netherlands	3
Great Britain	1

=== Final standings ===
1. Australia
2. South Korea
3. Netherlands
4. Great Britain
5. West Germany
6. Canada
7. Argentina
8. United States

== Medal summary ==
=== Medal table ===
* Host nation (South Korea)

Rank	Nation	Gold	Silver	Bronze	Total
1	Australia	1	0	0	1
1	Great Britain	1	0	0	1
3	South Korea*	0	1	0	1
3	West Germany	0	1	0	1
5	Netherlands	0	0	2	2
Totals (5 entries)		2	2	2	6

=== Medalists ===
Event	Gold	Silver	Bronze
Men's tournament	Great Britain; Paul Barber; Stephen Batchelor; Kulbir Bhaura; Robert Clift; Richard Dodds; David Faulkner; Russell Garcia; Martyn Grimley; Sean Kerly; Jimmy Kirkwood; Richard Leman; Stephen Martin; Veryan Pappin; Jon Potter; Imran Sherwani; Ian Taylor	West Germany; Stefan Blöcher; Dirk Brinkmann; Thomas Brinkmann; Heiner Dopp; Hans-Henning Fastrich; Carsten Fischer; Tobias Frank; Volker Fried; Horst-Ulrich Hänel; Michael Hilgers; Andreas Keller; Michael Metz; Andreas Mollandin; Thomas Reck; Christian Schliemann; Ekkhard Schmidt-Opper	Netherlands; Marc Benninga; Floris Jan Bovelander; Jacques Brinkman; Maurits Crucq; Marc Delissen; Cees Jan Diepeveen; Patrick Faber; Ronald Jansen; René Klaassen; Hendrik Kooijman; Hidde Kruize; Frank Leistra; Erik Parlevliet; Gert Schlatmann; Tim Steens; Taco van den Honert
Women's tournament	Australia; Tracey Belbin; Deborah Bowman; Lee Capes; Michelle Capes; Sally Carbon; Elspeth Clement; Loretta Dorman; Maree Fish; Rechelle Hawkes; Lorraine Hillas; Kathleen Partridge; Sharon Patmore; Jackie Pereira; Sandra Pisani; Kim Small; Liane Tooth	South Korea; Chang Eun-Jung; Cho Ki-Hyang; Choi Choon-Ok; Chung Eun-Kyung; Chung Sang-Hyun; Han Gum Shil; Han Ok-Kyung; Hwang Keum-Sook; Jin Won-Sim; Kim Mi-Sun; Kim Soon-Duk; Kim Young-sook; Lim Kye-Sook; Park Soon-Ja; Seo Hyo-Sun; Seo Kwang-Mi	Netherlands; Willemien Aardenburg; Carina Benninga; Marjolein Eijsvogel; Yvonne Buter; Det de Beus; Annemieke Fokke; Noor Holsboer; Helen van der Ben; Lisanne Lejeune; Anneloes Nieuwenhuizen; Martine Ohr; Marieke van Doorn; Aletta van Manen; Sophie von Weiler; Laurien Willemse; Ingrid Wolff
