= Grahl =

Grahl is a surname. Notable people with this surname include:

- August Grahl (1791–1868), German portrait painter and miniaturist
- Denise Grahl (born 1993), German Paralympic swimmer
- Francisco Grahl (born 1992), Argentine footballer
- Jens Grahl (born 1988), German footballer
- John Grahl (born 1946), Scottish academic and professor
- John Grahl (comedian), Ghanaian comedian
- Steven Grahl, English cathedral organist
- Viola Grahl (born 1966), German field hockey player
