= Maryse Abendanon =

Dutch field hockey player

Personal information
- Born: 15 November 1966 (age 59) Amsterdam
Medal record
Women's field hockey
Representing the Netherlands
Champions Trophy
Gold medal – first place	1987 Amstelveen	Team
European Nations Cup
Gold medal – first place	1987 London	Team

Maryse Abendanon (born 15 November 1966 in Amsterdam) is a former Dutch field hockey player, who earned a total of 17 international caps in 1987 for the Dutch women's team, in which she scored four goals. She was a member of the squad that won the inaugural Women's Champions Trophy in 1987.

== Biography ==
Abendanon grew up in the city of Baarn, Netherlands. In her youth at the Baarnsch Lyceum she played in the national B- and later on A-teams. After her breakthrough as youth-player, she began to play at the highest level at that moment in the national competition. She did this at the hockey-club of Laren, Netherlands.

At the age of 18 she was selected for 'Jong-Oranje', the Dutch national youth team. She also transfers herself to the Amsterdamsche Hockey & Bandy Club, the Amsterdam hockey-club. She would play by then sixteen times for the Dutch national team. In 1987 she won the Champions Trophy in Amstelveen and the EuroHockey Nations Championship.

After her career, she became a trainer at hockey-clubs in Muiderberg and Baarn, where she still lives and works.
