= Aletta van Manen =

Dutch field hockey player

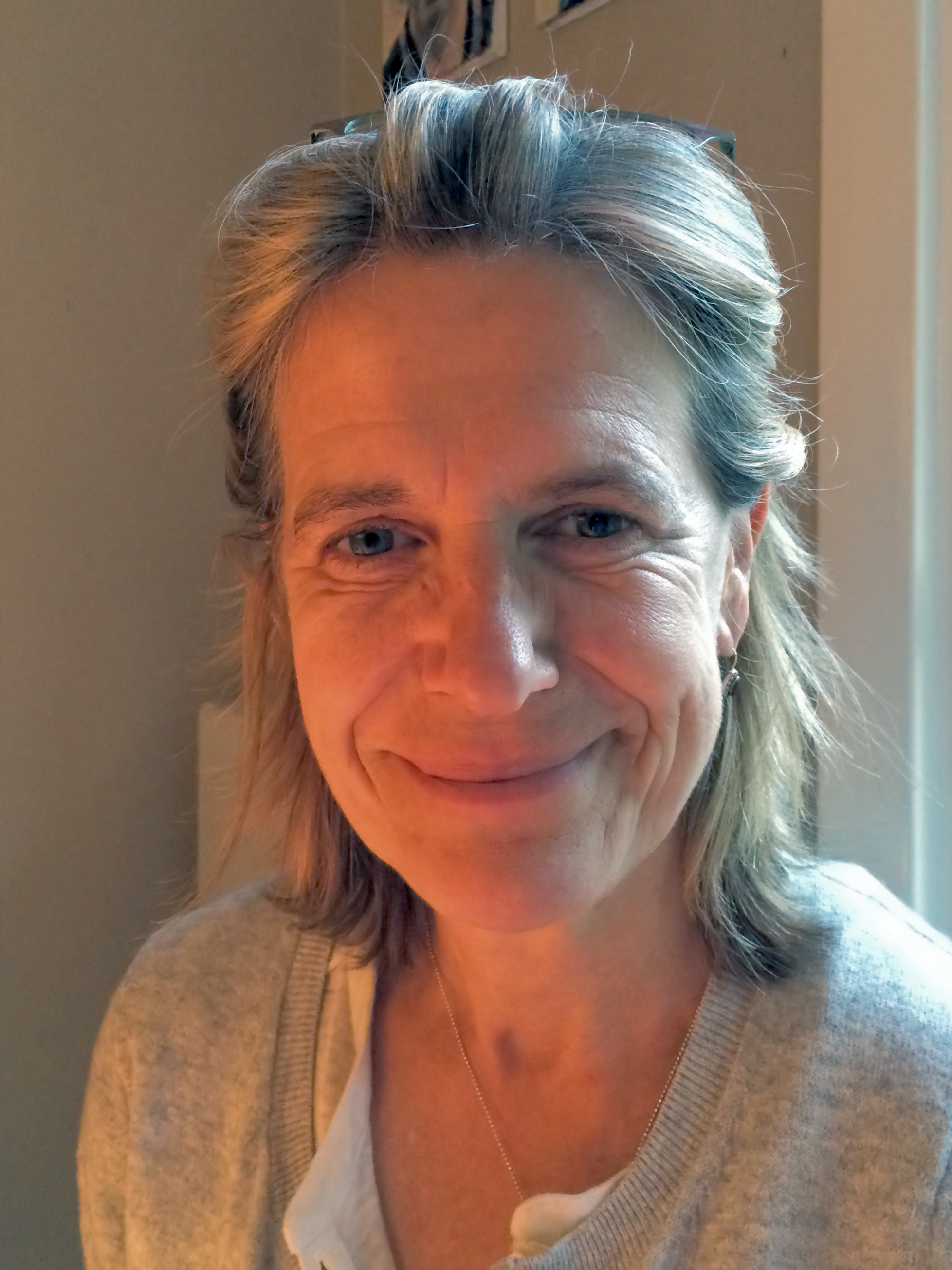
- Aletta van Manen in 2014

Personal information
- Born: 20 October 1958 (age 67) Wageningen, the Netherlands
- Height: 1.70 m (5 ft 7 in)
- Weight: 60 kg (132 lb)

Sport
- Sport: Field hockey
- Club: HGC
Medal record
Representing the Netherlands
Olympic Games
Gold medal – first place	1984 Los Angeles	Team
Bronze medal – third place	1988 Seoul	Team
World Cup
Gold medal – first place	1983 Kuala Lumpur	Team
Gold medal – first place	1986 Amstelveen	Team
Champions Trophy
Gold medal – first place	1987 Amstelveen	Team
European Nations Cup
Gold medal – first place	1987 London	Team

Aletta van Manen (born 20 October 1958) is a retired Dutch field hockey defender, who won a gold medal with the national team at the 1984 Summer Olympics, and a bronze at the 1988 Games.

From 1983 to 1988 she played a total number of 81 international matches for the Netherlands, in which she scored two goals. Van Manen retired after the 1988 Summer Olympics in South Korea.
