= Patrick Faber =

Patrick Faber may refer to:

- Patrick Faber (field hockey), Dutch hockey player
- Patrick Faber (politician), Belizean politician
