= Noor Holsboer =

Dutch field hockey player

Personal information
- Born: 12 July 1967 (age 59)
Medal record
Women's field hockey
Representing the Netherlands
Olympic Games
Bronze medal – third place	1988 Seoul	Team
Bronze medal – third place	1996 Atlanta	Team
World Cup
Gold medal – first place	1990 Sydney	Team
Champions Trophy
Gold medal – first place	1987 Amstelveen	Team
Silver medal – second place	1993 Amstelveen	Team
European Nations Cup
Gold medal – first place	1987 London	Team
Gold medal – first place	1995 Amstelveen	Team

Eleonoor ("Noor") Wendeline Holsboer (born 12 July 1967 in Enschede, Overijssel) is a former Dutch field hockey defender, who twice won a bronze Olympic medal with the Women's National Team: in 1988 and in 1996.

From 1987 to 1997 she played a total number of 139 international matches for the Netherlands.
