= Yvonne Buter =

Dutch field hockey player

Personal information
- Born: 18 March 1959 (age 67)
Medal record
Women's field hockey
Representing the Netherlands
Olympic Games
Bronze medal – third place	1988 Seoul	Team
Champions Trophy
Gold medal – first place	1987 Amstelveen	Team
European Nations Cup
Gold medal – first place	1987 London	Team

Yvonne Buter (born 18 March 1959 in Schiedam) is a former Dutch field hockey goalkeeper, who won the bronze medal with the National Women's Team at the 1988 Summer Olympics.

From 1985 to 1988 she played a total number of 29 international matches for Holland. Buter, a stand-in for first choice Det de Beus, retired after the 1988 Summer Olympics in South Korea.
