= Kim Young-sook (disambiguation) =

Kim Young-sook (born 1947) is a North Korean who was the first wife of Kim Jong-il.

Kim Young-sook may also refer to:

- Kim Young-sook (field hockey) (born 1975)
- Maya (singer) (born 1975), South Korean singer and actress
