= Hockey at the 1988 Olympics =

Hockey at the 1988 Olympics may refer to:

- Ice hockey at the 1988 Winter Olympics
- Field hockey at the 1988 Summer Olympics
