= Barbara Hambly (field hockey) =

British field hockey player

Personal information
- Born: 12 March 1958 (age 68) Chichester, West Sussex, England
Medal record
Women's field hockey
Representing England
European Nations Cup
Silver medal – second place	1987 London	Team

Barbara Hambly OBE (born 12 March 1958 in Chichester, West Sussex) is a former field hockey player from England, who captained the British squad at the 1988 Summer Olympics. She was appointed OBE in the 1990 New Year Honours.
