= Det de Beus =

Dutch field hockey player (1958–2013)

Personal information
- Born: Anna Maria Bernadette de Beus; 18 February 1958 Utrecht
- Died: 21 June 2013 (aged 55) Rijswijk
- Height: 180 cm (5 ft 11 in)
- Weight: 66 kg (146 lb)

Sport
- Sport: Field hockey
- Position: Goalkeeper
- Club: Eindhovense Mixed Hockey Club
National team
Years	Team	Caps	Goals
1978-1988	Netherlands	79	-
Medal record
Women's field hockey
Representing the Netherlands
Olympic Games
Gold medal – first place	1984 Los Angeles	Team
Bronze medal – third place	1988 Seoul	Team
Champions Trophy
Gold medal – first place	1987 Amstelveen	Team
European Nations Cup
Gold medal – first place	1987 London	Team

Anna Maria Bernadette "Det" de Beus (18 February 1958 – 21 July 2013) in the Netherlands. Born in Utrecht, she was the first goalkeeper in women's field hockey to wear a mask.

A player from Eindhovense Mixed Hockey Club in Eindhoven, De Beus played in goal for the Netherlands between 1978 and 1988. She played 105 caps for her country and was part of the gold medal-winning Olympic team in the 1984 Summer Olympics in Los Angeles. She retired from the sport at the end of Olympic Games in Seoul in September 1988 after winning the bronze medal by beating Great Britain 3–1.

She died of cancer in Rijswijk in July 2013.
