= Terry Sibbing =

Dutch field hockey player

Medal record

Women's field hockey

Representing the Netherlands

Champions Trophy
Gold medal – first place	1987 Amstelveen	Team competition

Terry Van Gijn-Sibbing (born 20 December 1963, Hendrik-Ido-Ambacht) is a former Dutch field hockey player, who earned a total number of 81 caps in the 1980s for the Dutch women's team, in which she scored four goals. She was a member of the squad that won the inaugural Women's Champions Trophy in 1987.
