= Wendy Baker =

Canadian field hockey player

Wendy Baker (born March 10, 1964, in Montreal, Quebec) is a former field hockey goalkeeper from Canada. She was a member of the Women's Senior National Team, which finished sixth at the 1988 Olympic Games in Seoul, South Korea.

== International senior tournaments ==
- 1987 — Champions Trophy, Amstelveen (4th place)
- 1988 — Olympic Games, Seoul (6th place)
