= Michael Nobbs =

Australian field hockey coach (1954–2026)

Personal information
- Nationality: Australian
- Born: 4 January 1954
- Died: 29 January 2026 (aged 72)
- Height: 1.83 m (6 ft 0 in)
- Weight: 81 kg (179 lb)

Sport
- Country: Australia
- Sport: Field hockey
Medal record
Representing Australia

Michael Jack Nobbs (4 January 1954 – 29 January 2026) was an Australian international level field hockey player. He represented Australia as a member of the Australia men's national team at the 1984 Summer Olympics. Nobbs also coached the India men's national team from 2011 to 2013.

== Hockey player ==
In 1984, Nobbs was a member of the Australian hockey team at the 1984 Summer Olympics.

== Hockey coach ==
Following his playing career Nobbs coached the India men's national team from June 2011 until July 2013 including at the 2012 Summer Olympics in London. He also coached at the Westfields Sports High School, Fairfield in Sydney.

== Personal life and death ==
His daughter Kaitlin Nobbs plays hockey and is a member of the New South Wales Arrows and Australian Women's team Development Squad. She made her international debut in 2016 at the International Hockey Open in Darwin, NT. His wife Lee Capes, sister-in-law Michelle Capes and brother-in-law Mark Hager also represented the nation at the Olympic Games.

Nobbs died on 29 January 2026, at the age of 72.
