= Laurien Willemse =

Dutch field hockey player (born 1962)

Medal record

Women's field hockey

Representing the Netherlands

Olympic Games
Gold medal – first place	1984 Los Angeles	Team
Bronze medal – third place	1988 Seoul	Team

Champions Trophy
Gold medal – first place	1987 Amstelveen	Team

European Nations Cup
Gold medal – first place	1987 London	Team

Laura ("Laurien") Eveline Gales-Willemse (born 26 March 1962 in Haarlem, North Holland) is a former Dutch field hockey defender, who won the golden medal with the National Women's Team at the 1984 Summer Olympics. She played club hockey for NMHC Nijmegen and HGC from Wassenaar.

Four years later in Seoul she captured the bronze medal with the national side. From 1981 to 1988 she played a total number of 63 international matches for Holland, in which she scored eleven goals. Willemse retired after the 1988 Summer Olympics in South Korea.
