= Kaitlin Nobbs =

Australian field hockey player

Personal information
- Born: 24 September 1997 (age 29) Newington, New South Wales, Australia
- Height: 1.65 m (5 ft 5 in)
- Weight: 68 kg (150 lb)

Sport
- Sport: Field hockey
- Position: Midfielder
Senior career
Years	Team	Caps	Goals
–	NSW Arrows	-	-
2025–	Odisha Warriors	-	-
National team
Years	Team	Caps	Goals
2016–	Australia	133	(10)
Medal record
Women's field hockey
Representing Australia
World Cup
Bronze medal – third place	2022 Terrassa–Amstelveen
FIH Pro League
Silver medal – second place	2019
Bronze medal – third place	2022–23
Commonwealth Games
Silver medal – second place	2018 Gold Coast	Team
Silver medal – second place	2022 Birmingham	Team
Champions Trophy
Silver medal – second place	2018 Changzhou
Oceania Cup
Gold medal – first place	2017 Sydney
Gold medal – first place	2023 Whangārei
Silver medal – second place	2019 Rockhampton
Junior World Cup
Bronze medal – third place	2016 Santiago

Kaitlin Nobbs (born 24 September 1997) is an Australian field hockey player. She has played for the Australian national team, the Hockeyroos.

== Early life ==
Nobbs is the daughter of Australian field hockey players Michael Nobbs and Lee Capes. Her father played in the 1984 Summer Olympics and coached the Indian men's team at the 2012 Summer Olympics, while her mother won the gold medal at the 1988 Summer Olympics. Her aunt Michelle Capes and uncle Mark Hager also represented Australia at field hockey at the Olympics. Nobbs has an older sister, Jaimee, who is a competitive figure skater.

Nobbs was born in Western Australia and lived there until the age of 14. She then moved to Newington, New South Wales. She graduated from Presbyterian Ladies' College, Sydney in 2015. She then began attending Curtin University where she studied nursing.

== Career ==
In 2014, Nobbs played for her first professional hockey team, the New South Wales Arrows, part of the Australian Hockey League.

Nobbs received a scholarship to train alongside the national senior team ahead of the 2016 Summer Olympics, although she was not a full member of the senior team. Nobbs was selected to the 2016 Junior World Cup team which won a bronze medal. Also in 2016, Nobbs was named to the senior Australian women's national field hockey team, the Hockeyroos, for the first time. Nobbs was selected to replace Anna Flanagan ahead of a four-team tournament in Japan. Nobbs was again part of the Australian team when they won bronze at the 2017 Hawkes Bay tournament.

Nobbs won the 2015 Jeanette Buckham Award for Outstanding Individual Sportswoman and was named the 2016 Burwood's Sportsperson of the Year.

Nobbs qualified for the Tokyo 2020 Olympics. She was part of the Hockeyroos Olympics squad. The Hockeyroos lost 1–0 to India in the quarterfinals and therefore were not in medal contention.

== International goals ==
Goal	Date	Location	Opponent	Score	Result	Competition	Ref.
1	12 October 2017	Sydney Olympic Park, Sydney, Australia	Papua New Guinea	16–0	23–0	2017 Oceania Cup	
2	25 April 2019	National Hockey Centre, Auckland, New Zealand	New Zealand	1–0	5–1	2019 FIH Pro League	
3	29 June 2019	Wagener Stadium, Amsterdam, Netherlands	Netherlands	2–2	2–2	2019 FIH Pro League	
4	18 August 2019	Oi Hockey Stadium, Tokyo, Japan	India	1–0	2–2	2019 Olympic Test Event	
5	30 July 2022	University of Birmingham Hockey Centre, Birmingham, England	Kenya	1–0	8–0	XXII Commonwealth Games	
6	30 July 2022	University of Birmingham Hockey Centre, Birmingham, England	Kenya	3–0	8–0	XXII Commonwealth Games	
7	30 July 2022	University of Birmingham Hockey Centre, Birmingham, England	Kenya	8–0	8–0	XXII Commonwealth Games	
8	31 July 2022	University of Birmingham Hockey Centre, Birmingham, England	South Africa	4–0	5–0	XXII Commonwealth Games	
9	2 August 2022	University of Birmingham Hockey Centre, Birmingham, England	New Zealand	1–0	1–0	XXII Commonwealth Games	
10	7 February 2024	Kalinga Stadium, Bhubaneswar, India	India	3–0	3–0	2023–24 FIH Pro League	
