= Sophie von Weiler =

Dutch field hockey player

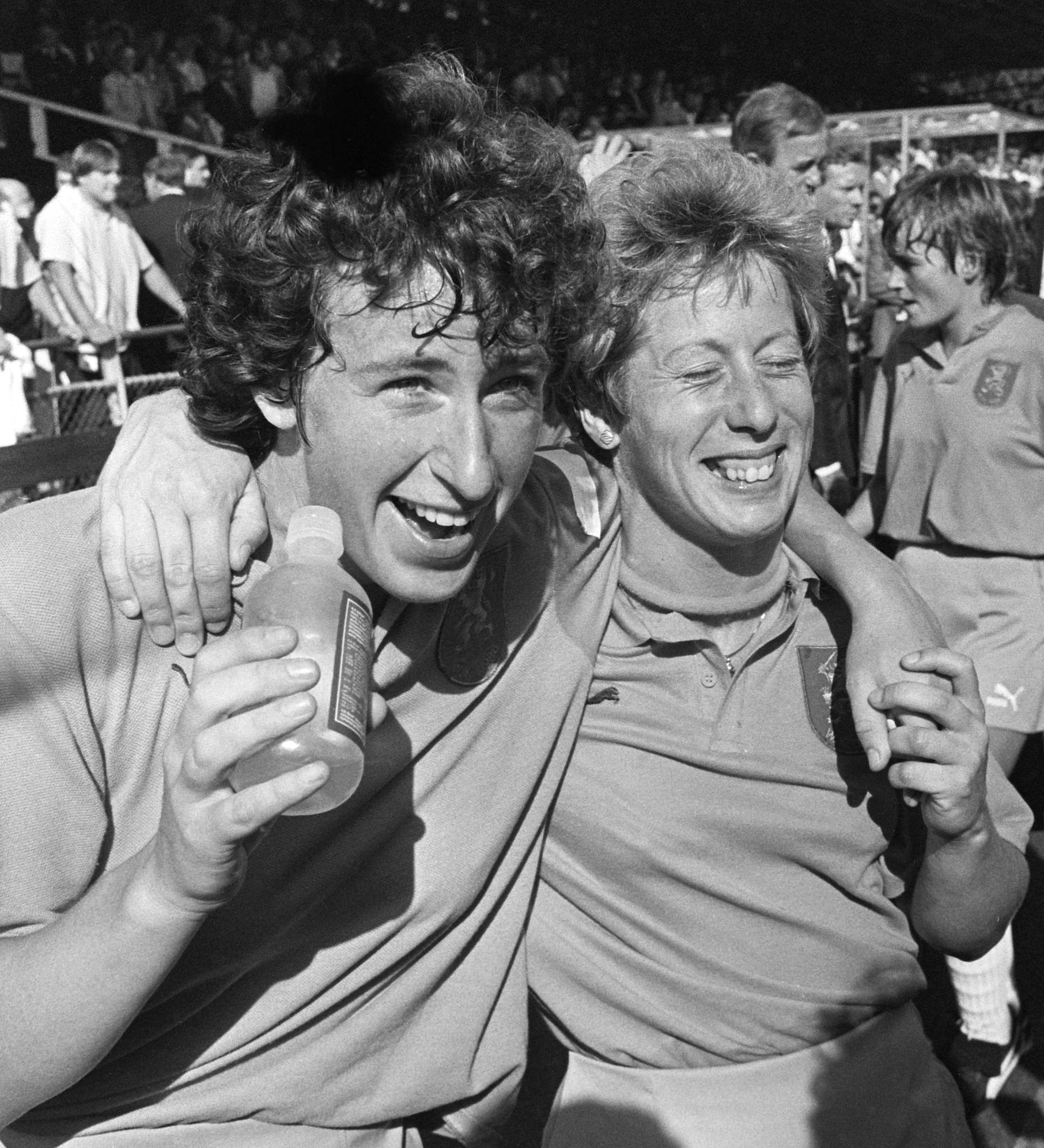
- Marjolein Eijsvogel and Sophie von Weiler (right) in 1986

Personal information
- Born: 24 December 1958 (age 67) Den Bosch, the Netherlands
- Height: 1.59 m (5 ft 3 in)
- Weight: 62 kg (137 lb)

Sport
- Sport: Field hockey
- Club: HMHC, Hilversum
Medal record
Representing the Netherlands
Olympic Games
Gold medal – first place	1984 Los Angeles	Team
Bronze medal – third place	1988 Seoul	Team
World Cup
Silver medal – second place	1981 Buenos Aires	Team
Gold medal – first place	1983 Kuala Lumpur	Team
Gold medal – first place	1986 Amstelveen	Team
Champions Trophy
Gold medal – first place	1987 Amstelveen	Team
European Nations Cup
Gold medal – first place	1987 London	Team

Sophie Pauline von Weiler (born 24 December 1958) is a retired Dutch field hockey forward, who won the gold medal at the 1984 Summer Olympics.

Four years later in Seoul she captured the bronze medal with the national side. From 1978 to 1988 she played a total number of 137 international matches for Holland, in which she scored 69 goals. She retired after the 1988 Summer Olympics in South Korea. In the 1990s Von Weiler had a short spell with the Dutch Women's Team, when she was manager of the national side.
