= Cheryl Van Kuren =

American field hockey player

Cheryl Lynne Van Kuren (born August 1, 1964, in Allentown, Pennsylvania) is a former field hockey player from the United States who finished in eighth place with Team USA at the 1988 Summer Olympics in Seoul.

She played collegiate field hockey at Old Dominion University in Norfolk, Virginia from 1982 to 1985. She later earned an MBA from the University of Baltimore.
