= Martine Ohr =

Dutch field hockey player

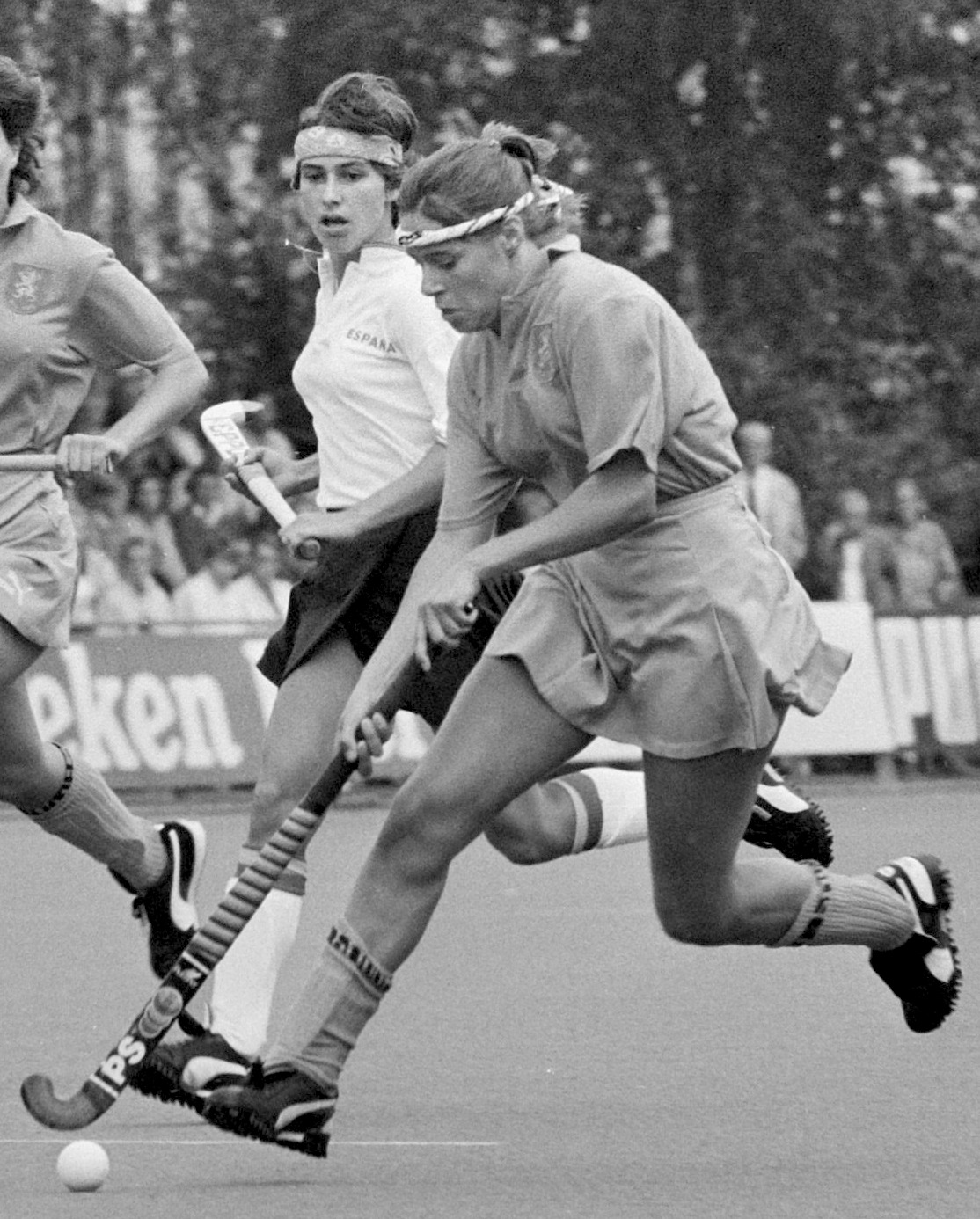
- Martine Ohr at the 1986 World Cup

Personal information
- Born: 11 June 1964 (age 62) Den Helder, the Netherlands
- Height: 1.70 m (5 ft 7 in)
- Weight: 61 kg (134 lb)

Sport
- Sport: Field hockey
- Club: HDM
Medal record
Representing the Netherlands
Olympic Games
Gold medal – first place	1984 Los Angeles	Team
Bronze medal – third place	1988 Seoul	Team
World Cup
Gold medal – first place	1983 Kuala Lumpur	Team
Gold medal – first place	1986 Amstelveen	Team
Champions Trophy
Gold medal – first place	1987 Amstelveen	Team
Bronze medal – third place	1991 Berlin	Team
European Nations Cup
Gold medal – first place	1984 Lille	Team

Martine Ohr (born 11 June 1964) is a retired Dutch field hockey striker, who won a gold medal at the 1984 Summer Olympics and a bronze at the 1988 Games. She also participated in the 1992 Summer Olympics, where the Dutch team finished sixth. Between 1983 and 1992 she played 109 international matches and scored 19 goals.
