= Patrick Faber (field hockey) =

Dutch field hockey player

Personal information
- Born: 7 May 1964 (age 62)
Medal record
Men's Field hockey
Representing the Netherlands
Olympic Games
Bronze medal – third place	1988 Seoul	Team competition

Patrick Franciscus Maria Faber (born 7 May 1964 in 's-Hertogenbosch, North Brabant) is a former Dutch field hockey player, who earned a total number of 27 caps, scoring five goals in the 1980s for the Netherlands national field hockey team. The striker was a member of the bronze medal-winning Dutch team at the 1988 Summer Olympics in Seoul.
