= Marina van der Merwe =

Field hockey coach

Personal information
- Born: 7 February 1937 (age 89) Cape Town, South Africa

Sport
- Sport: Field hockey
Coaching career
- Years: Team
- 1976-1995: Canada
- 1971-1999: York Lions

Marina van der Merwe (born February 7, 1937) is a former field hockey coach, who was born in Cape Town, South Africa.

== Coaching career ==
She was the head coach of the Canada women's national field hockey team from 1976 to 1995. During her time as coach, the team qualified for every major international games. Her teams medal-led at the World Cups in 1983 (silver) and in 1986, and bronze at the Pan Am Games in 1987.

van der Merwe coached the York Lions from 1971 to 1999. During this time, the Lions won six silver and two bronze medals in the Canadian Interuniversity Sport competition, and seven Ontario University Athletics championships. Members of her team included 41 all-Canadians, over 55 conference all-stars, and more than 10 national team athletes.

van der Merwe retired from teaching at York University in 2002.

== Awards and honours ==
In addition to the U Sports Field Hockey Coach of the Year award now named in van der Merwe's honour, her contributions to the sport were recognized through multiple awards:

- 1994, Canadian Interuniversity Sport Field Hockey Coach of the Year award
- 1999, Canadian Interuniversity Sport Field Hockey Coach of the Year award
- 2004, York Lions Hall of Fame inductee
- 2014, Canada's Sports Hall of Fame inductee
