= Eva Hegener =

German field hockey player

Eva Hegener (born 24 June 1961, in Cologne) is a German former field hockey player who competed in the 1988 Summer Olympics.
