= Julie Cook =

British field hockey player

Medal record

Women's field hockey

Representing England

European Nations Cup
Silver medal – second place	1987 London	Team

Julie Cook (born 8 March 1954) is a former England and Great Britain field hockey goalkeeper.

She joined the England team in 1980 as a reserve goalie to Pauline Gibbon, and became actual goalie when Gibbon retired in 1985. She also played for her county, Suffolk. After her Olympic career, Cook finally ended her playing career because of injury and served as a PE teacher at the Harwich School until her retirement in 2009.
