= Tracey Belbin =

Australian field hockey player (born 1967)

Personal information
- Full name: Tracey Lee Belbin
- Born: 24 June 1967 (age 59) Tingalpa, Queensland
- Height: 169 cm (5 ft 7 in)
- Weight: 67 kg (148 lb)
Medal record
Women's field hockey
Representing Australia
Olympic Games
Gold medal – first place	1988 Seoul	Team competition
World Cup
Silver medal – second place	1990 Sydney	Team competition
Champions Trophy
Gold medal – first place	1991 Berlin	Team competition
Silver medal – second place	1987 Amstelveen	Team competition
Silver medal – second place	1989 Frankfurt	Team competition

Tracey Lee Belbin OAM (born 24 June 1967 in Cairns, Queensland) is a former field hockey player from Australia, who represented her native country at two consecutive Summer Olympics, starting in 1988 in Seoul, South Korea. There she won the gold medal with the Women's National Team.

As a student of the University of Queensland in Brisbane she graduated in 1993, getting a double major in psychology. After her active career she became a hockey coach, working as an assistant for the South African Women's Team. In January 1999 Belbin was named Head Coach of the US Women's Team, with whom she won the silver medal at the 1999 Pan American Games. She resigned after the 2002 Women's Hockey World Cup.

In 2009 Belbin was inducted into the Queensland Sport Hall of Fame.
