= Gabriele Uhlenbruck =

German field hockey player

Gabriele Uhlenbruck (born 27 October 1965 in Kettwig) is a German former field hockey player who competed in the 1988 Summer Olympics.
