= Marieke van Doorn =

Dutch field hockey player (born 1960)

Medal record

Women's field hockey

Representing the Netherlands

Olympic Games
Gold medal – first place	1984 Los Angeles	Team competition
Bronze medal – third place	1988 Seoul	Team competition

Champions Trophy
Gold medal – first place	1987 Amstelveen	Team competition

Marieke Birgitta van Doorn (born 15 June 1960 in Rotterdam) is a former Dutch field hockey midfielder, who was a member of the National Women's Team that won the golden medal at the 1984 Summer Olympics.

Four years later in Seoul she captured the bronze medal with the Dutch national side. From 1982 to 1988 she played a total number of 100 international matches for Holland, in which she scored 29 goals. She retired after the 1988 Summer Olympics and was in charge as a hockey coach in the 1990s at her former club HGC.
