= Silke Wehrmeister =

German field hockey player

Silke Wehrmeister (born 17 August 1966, died 25 October 2024) was a German former field hockey player who competed in the 1988 Summer Olympics.
