= Sandra Levy =

Canadian field hockey player

Personal information
- Full name: Sandra Elizabeth Levy
- Born: 3 December 1965 (age 60) Kingston, Jamaica

Sport
- Sport: Field hockey
Senior career
Years	Team	Caps	Goals
1985?-1993?	York Lions	-	-
National team
Years	Team	Caps	Goals
1988?-1992?	Canada		-
Medal record
Women's field hockey
Representing Canada
Pan American Games
Silver medal – second place	1991 Havana	Team competition
Bronze medal – third place	1987 Indianapolis	Team competition

Sandra Elizabeth Levy (born 3 December 1965) is a Canadian former field hockey player, who represented Canada at the 1988 Summer Olympics in Seoul, South Korea, and the 1992 Summer Olympics in Barcelona, Spain. The Toronto, Ontario native ended up in seventh place with the Canadian National Team in Barcelona, after having finished in sixth place four years earlier in Seoul.

== University hockey and education ==
Levy was a member of Toronto's York Lions field hockey and indoor hockey teams. She obtained a Bachelor's degree in English in 1990 from York University and an LL.B. from Osgoode Hall Law School in 1995.

== International career ==
Levy's international career spanned eleven years with the national women's team. During this time, her teams won silver medal at the 1991 Pan American Games, and bronze at the 1987 Pan American Games.

Tournaments include:

- 1987 — Champions Trophy, Amstelveen (4th place)
- 1988 — Olympic Games, Seoul (6th place)
- 1992 — Olympic Games, Barcelona (7th place)

== Canadian Olympic Committee ==
After retiring, Levy has been involved with the Canadian Olympic Committee. In 1988, she was a member of the mission team to the 1988 Winter Olympics. Levy was involved in the 2008 Toronto Olympic bid as Director of Special Projects. In 2014, Levy was the Canadian Chef de Mission for the 2014 Summer Youth Olympics.

== Awards and honours ==
- 1985-1989, OWIAA All Star
- 1986-1989, CIAU All-Canadian
- 1984-1985, CIAU silver medal
- 1986-1987, CIAU silver medal
- 1988-1989, CIAU bronze medal
- 4x CIAU Tournament All-Star
- 1992-93, York Lions Female Athlete of the Year
- 2000, Johnny F. Basset Award for Sporting Excellence and Community Values
- 2003, inducted in the York University Sport of Hall of Fame
- 2008, African Canadian Achievement Award of Excellence
