= Trudy Kilkolly =

New Zealand field hockey player

Trudy Anne Kilkolly (born 4 October 1965 in Wanganui) is a former field hockey player from New Zealand, who finished in eighth position with the National Women's Field Hockey Team, nicknamed The Black Sticks, at the 1992 Summer Olympics in Barcelona.
