= Willemien Aardenburg =

Dutch field hockey player

Medal record

Women's Field Hockey

Representing the Netherlands

Olympic Games
Bronze medal – third place	1988 Seoul	Team competition

Willemien Aardenburg (born August 30, 1966, in Laren, North Holland) is a former Dutch field hockey player, who won the bronze medal with the national women's team at the 1988 Summer Olympics in Seoul, South Korea. Aardenburg just played three international matches for the Dutch, in which she did not score.
