= Frank Leistra =

Dutch field hockey player

Medal record

Men's Field Hockey

Representing the Netherlands

Olympic Games
Bronze medal – third place	1988 Seoul	Team competition

World Cup
Gold medal – first place	1990 Lahore	Team competition

Frank Jan Anton Leistra (born 1 April 1960 in Delft) is a former field hockey goalkeeper from the Netherlands, who was a member of the Dutch team that won the bronze medal at the 1988 Summer Olympics in Seoul.

Leistra played a total number of 159 international matches for his native country, and made his debut on 1 June 1985 in a friendly match against Scotland. In 1990 he won the world title with the national team at the 1990 Men's Hockey World Cup in Lahore, Pakistan. He resigned after the fourth-place finishing at the 1992 Summer Olympics in Barcelona.
