= Christine Arthur =

New Zealand field hockey player

Christine Arthur (born 26 August 1963 in Stratford, New Zealand) played field hockey for New Zealand in the 1980s and 1990s.

== Provincial and international playing career ==
Arthur played hockey in Taranaki, Otago and Canterbury and made her international debut in 1983. She was part of the team that finished sixth at the 1984 Summer Olympics in Los Angeles, California, and eight years later was selected for the team competing at the 1992 Summer Olympics in Barcelona. The team finished in eighth, and last, place in the tournament. Arthur earned 86 test caps during her international career.

== Coaching and management ==
Arthur has also acted as coach for the Junior Women's national hockey team and was New Zealand's Chef de Mission at the Gwangju 2015 FISU World University Games.

She was deputy principal for Diocesan School for Girls from 2006 to 2017. Since then she has worked for High Performance Sport New Zealand in athlete wellbeing roles.
