= Waterproof (comedian) =

Ghanaian comedian (d. 2009)

- Born: John Grahl
- Died: 2009
- Citizenship: Ghanaian
- Occupations: Comedian and Actor

John Grahl (died 2009), also known as Waterproof, was a Ghanaian comedian and actor. He featured on numerous shows and was Ghana's first stand-up comedian.
