= Annemieke Fokke =

Dutch field hockey player

Personal information
- Born: 4 November 1967 (age 58) Heemstede, North Holland, Netherlands
Medal record
Women's field hockey
Representing the Netherlands
Olympic Games
Bronze medal – third place	1988 Seoul	Team
World Cup
Gold medal – first place	1990 Sydney	Team
Champions Trophy
Bronze medal – third place	1991 Berlin	Team
European Nations Cup
Gold medal – first place	1987 London	Team

Annemieke Fokke (born 4 November 1967 in Heemstede, North Holland) is a former Dutch field hockey player, who won the bronze medal with the National Women's Team at the 1988 Summer Olympics.

From 1987 to 1992 she played a total number of 95 international matches for Holland, in which she did not score. Fokke retired after the 1992 Summer Olympics in Barcelona, Spain, where the Dutch finished in sixth position.
