= Choi Choon-ok =

South Korean field hockey player

- Hangul: 최춘옥
- Hanja: 崔春玉
- RR: Choe Chunok
- MR: Ch'oe Ch'unok

Choi Choon-ok
Medal record

Women's field hockey

Representing South Korea

Olympic Games
Silver medal – second place	1988 Seoul	Team

Asian Games
Gold medal – first place	1986 Seoul	Team

Choi Choon-ok (born 15 May 1965 in Pyeongtaek, Gyeonggi) is a South Korean former field hockey player who competed in the 1988 Summer Olympics.

== Education ==
- Kyung Hee University
