= Kathleen Partridge =

Australian field hockey player (1963–2021)

Olympic medal record

Women's field hockey

Representing Australia
Gold medal – first place	1988 Seoul	Team competition

Kathleen Partridge (7 December 1963 – 13 September 2021) was an Australian field hockey player who competed in the 1988 Summer Olympics and in the 1992 Summer Olympics. Partridge debuted for Australia in 1985 making the Australian field hockey squad in 1982. She has received a Medal of the Order of Australia in 1989 and an Australian Sports Medal in 2000. All up, Partridge has attended five Olympics; two as a field hockey player (Barcelona, Vice Captain 5th, Seoul, Gold ) and three in a coaching capacity as a specialist goalkeeping coach with the Hockeyroos. Partridge was appointed goalkeeping coach to work with Ric Charlesworth in 1995 through to 2000 and in that time the Hockeyroos won many gold medals including Olympic gold medals in Atlanta (1996) and Sydney (2000).

Kathleen attended O'Connor Catholic College § Education
