= Helen van der Ben =

Dutch field hockey player (born 1964)

Medal record
Women's field hockey
Representing the Netherlands
Olympic Games
Bronze medal – third place	1988 Seoul	Team
World Cup
Gold medal – first place	1990 Sydney	Team
Champions Trophy
Gold medal – first place	1987 Amstelveen	Team
Bronze medal – third place	1991 Berlin	Team
European Nations Cup
Gold medal – first place	1987 London	Team

Helena ("Helen") Johanna Lejeune-Van der Ben (born 25 July 1964 in Amsterdam, North Holland) is a former Dutch field hockey defender, who won the bronze medal with the national women's team at the 1988 Summer Olympics.

From 1984 to 1992 she played 121 international matches for Holland, and scored 57 goals, most of them from penalty corners. She retired after the 1992 Summer Olympics in Barcelona, Spain, where the Dutch side finished in sixth place. Later on she became a field hockey coach, at her former club HGC in Wassenaar.
