= Viola Grahl =

German field hockey player

Viola Grahl (born 29 March 1966) is a German former field hockey player who competed in the 1988 Summer Olympics.
