= Karen Brown (field hockey) =

British field hockey player

Personal information
- Born: 9 January 1963 (age 63) Redhill, Surrey, England

Sport
- Sport: Field hockey
Medal record
Women's field hockey
Representing Great Britain
Olympic Games
Bronze medal – third place	1992 Barcelona	Team
Representing England
Commonwealth Games
Silver medal – second place	1998 Kuala Lumpur	Team
European Nations Cup
Gold medal – first place	1991 Brussels	Team
Silver medal – second place	1987 London	Team
Bronze medal – third place	1999 Cologne	Team

Karen Brown MBE (born 9 January 1963) is a former field hockey defender, who was a member of the British squad that won the bronze medal at the 1992 Summer Olympics in Barcelona, Commonwealth Silver medal and European Gold

Brown is England and Great Britain's second-highest capped player of all time, with 355 caps to her name. Her record was broken by Kate Richardson-Walsh in February 2016 during a test series with Australia, where Brown was working as Assistant Coach in the GB Team.

She competed in three consecutive Summer Olympics, starting in 1988. Brown retired in 1999, having played for England on 179 occasions & Great Britain 176. Brown (England, March 1984 – August 1999) played a total of 355 international matches and has the most (5) appearances in the European Championship.

== Coaching career ==
She was Assistant Coach for both the Great Britain and England hockey teams and part of the management teams that secured a World Cup bronze with England in 2010, Olympic bronze with Great Britain at the London Olympics, European Gold in 2015 and Olympic Gold at the Rio Olympics.

She stepped down from her role as Assistant Coach in January 2017, with the intention of working for England and GB Hockey in a coach development capacity.
