= Cho Ki-hyang =

South Korean field hockey player (born 1963)

- Hangul: 조기향
- Hanja: 趙基香
- RR: Jo Gihyang
- MR: Cho Kihyang

Cho Ki-hyang
Medal record

Women's field hockey

Representing South Korea

Olympic Games
Silver medal – second place	1988 Seoul	Team

Asian Games
Gold medal – first place	1986 Seoul	Team
Silver medal – second place	1982 Delhi	Team

Cho Ki-hyang (born 23 September 1963 in Donghae, Gangwon) is a South Korean former field hockey player who competed in the 1988 Summer Olympics.

== Education ==
- Cheongju College of Education (Seowon University)
- Mukho Girls' Commercial High School (Donghae Commercial High School)
