= Kim Soon-duk (field hockey) =

Field hockey player

Medal record

Women's field hockey

Representing South Korea

Olympic Games
Silver medal – second place	1988 Seoul	Team

Asian Games
Gold medal – first place	1986 Seoul	Team
Gold medal – first place	1990 Beijing	Team

Kim Soon-Duk (born 20 December 1967) is a South Korean former field hockey player who competed in the 1988 Summer Olympics.
