= Shona Schleppe =

Canadian field hockey player

Shona Schleppe (born 27 July 1963) is a Canadian former field hockey player who competed in the 1988 Summer Olympics. She was born in Lethbridge, Alberta.
