= Liz Czenczek =

Canadian field hockey player

Liz Czenczek (born 30 July 1964 in Calgary, Alberta) is a Canadian former field hockey player who competed in the 1988 Summer Olympics.
