= Han Gum-shil =

Field hockey player

Medal record

Women's field hockey

Representing South Korea

Olympic Games
Silver medal – second place	1988 Seoul	Team

Asian Games
Gold medal – first place	1990 Beijing	Team

Han Gum-Shil (born 24 January 1968) is a South Korean former field hockey player who competed in the 1988 Summer Olympics and in the 1992 Summer Olympics.
