= Nancy Charlton =

Canadian field hockey player

Nancy Charlton (born 8 October 1962) is a Canadian former field hockey player who competed in the 1984 Summer Olympics and in the 1988 Summer Olympics.

Charlton was born in Victoria, British Columbia, Canada.
