= Moira MacLeod =

British field hockey player

Moira MacLeod (born 16 October 1957) is a retired female field hockey player from Scotland, who was a member of the British squad at the 1988 Summer Olympics.
