= Caroline Jordan =

British field hockey player

Caroline Jordan (born 2 August 1964) is a British former field hockey player who competed in the 1988 Summer Olympics.
