= Kathryn Johnson (field hockey, born 1963) =

Canadian field hockey player

Personal information
- Born: September 9, 1963
Medal record
Field hockey
Pan American Games
Bronze medal – third place	1987 Indianapolis	Women's team

Kathryn Johnson (born 9 September 1963) is a Canadian former field hockey player. Johnson competed in the 1988 Summer Olympics and won a bronze medal at the 1987 Pan American Games.
