= Chung Eun-kyung =

South Korean field hockey player

Medal record

Women's field hockey

Representing South Korea

Olympic Games
Silver medal – second place	1988 Seoul	Team

Asian Games
Gold medal – first place	1986 Seoul	Team

Chung Eun-Kyung (born 22 March 1965) is a retired South Korean field hockey player who competed in the 1988 Summer Olympics.
