= Jackie Pereira =

Australian field hockey player

Personal information
- Full name: Jacqueline Margaret Pereira
- Born: 29 October 1964 (age 61)
Medal record
Women's field hockey
Representing Australia
Olympic Games
| Gold medal – first place | 1988 Seoul | Team competition |
| Gold medal – first place | 1996 Atlanta | Team competition |
World Cup
| Gold medal – first place | 1994 Dublin | Team competition |
| Silver medal – second place | 1990 Sydney | Team competition |
Champions Trophy
| Gold medal – first place | 1991 Berlin | Team competition |
| Gold medal – first place | 1993 Amstelveen | Team competition |
| Gold medal – first place | 1995 Mar del Plata | Team competition |
| Silver medal – second place | 1987 Amstelveen | Team competition |
| Silver medal – second place | 1989 Frankfurt | Team competition |

Jacqueline ("Jackie") Margaret Pereira, OAM (born 29 October 1964 in Perth, Western Australia) is a former field hockey striker from Australia, who competed for her native country in three consecutive Summer Olympics, starting in 1988 (Seoul, South Korea). She was a member of the Australian Women's Hockey Team, best known as the Hockeyroos, that won the gold medals at the 1988 and the 1996 Summer Olympics. She was inducted into the Sport Australia Hall of Fame in 1998.
