= Wendy Banks =

British field hockey player

Wendy Banks (born 27 February 1960) is a British former field hockey player who competed in the 1988 Summer Olympics.
