= Chung Sang-hyun =

South Korean field hockey player

Medal record

Women's field hockey

Representing South Korea

Olympic Games
Silver medal – second place	1988 Seoul	Team

Asian Games
Gold medal – first place	1986 Seoul	Team
Silver medal – second place	1982 Delhi	Team

Chung Sang-Hyun (born 17 January 1963) is a South Korean former field hockey player who competed in the 1988 Summer Olympics.
