= Heike Gehrmann =

German field hockey player

Heike Gehrmann (born 18 May 1968 in Bremen) is a German former field hockey player who competed in the 1988 Summer Olympics.
