= Sharon Bayes =

Canadian field hockey player

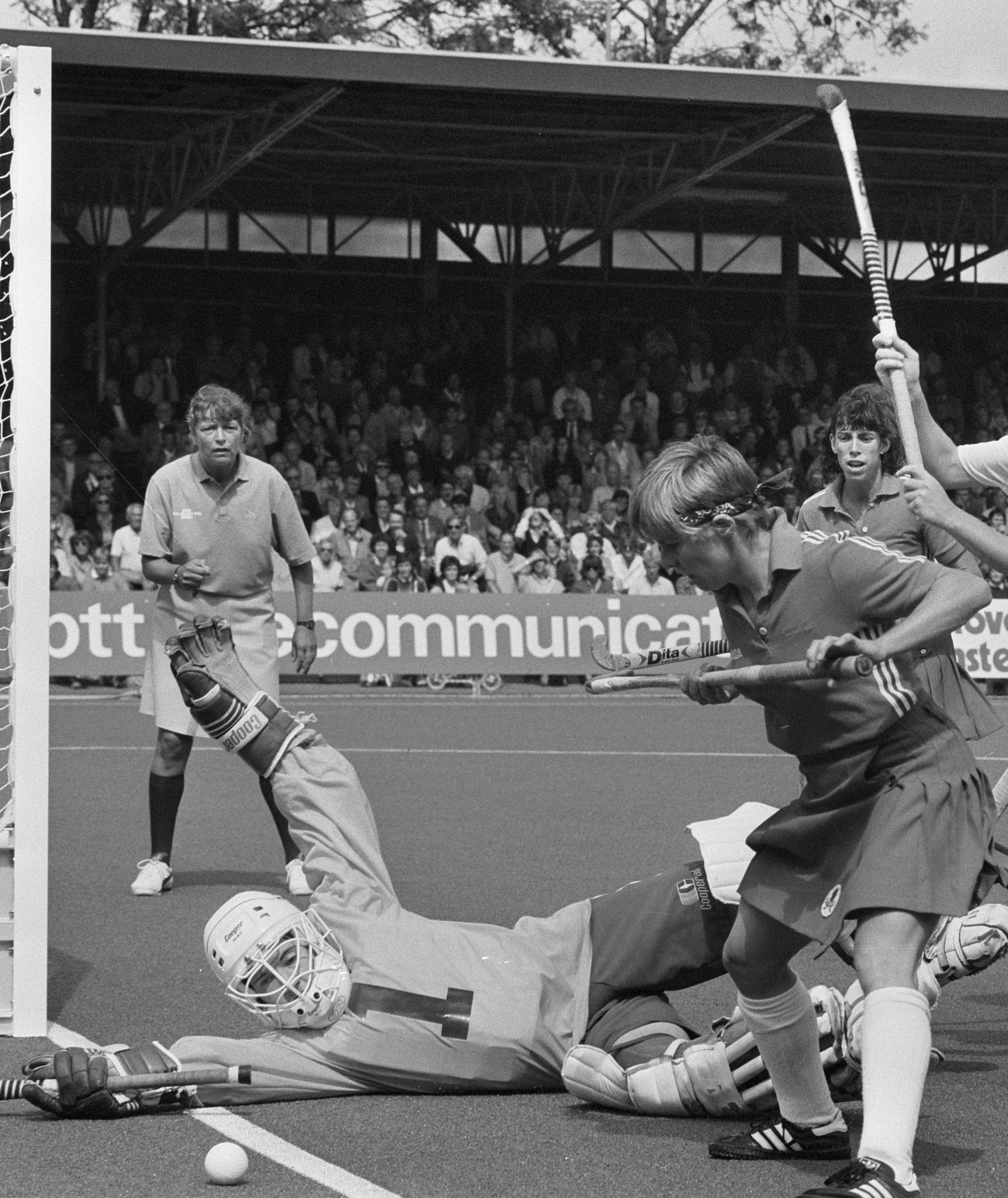
- Bayes in 1986

Personal information
- Born: 5 February 1965 (age 61) Etobicoke, Ontario, Canada
- Height: 1.65 m (5 ft 5 in)
- Weight: 63 kg (139 lb)

Sport
- Sport: Field hockey
- Club: Nomads II
Medal record
Representing Canada
Pan American Games
Bronze medal – third place	1987 Indianapolis	Team

Sharon Bayes (later Speers; born 5 February 1965) is a Canadian former field hockey goalkeeper. She competed at the 1984 and 1988 Summer Olympics and finished in fifth and sixth place, respectively. She won a bronze medal at the 1987 Pan American Games.
