= Sharon Buchanan =

Australian field hockey player

Personal information
- Born: 12 March 1963 (age 63) Western Australia
- Height: 168 cm (5 ft 6 in)
- Weight: 58 kg (128 lb)
Medal record
Women's field hockey
Representing Australia
Olympic Games
Gold medal – first place	1988 Seoul	Team competition
World Cup
Silver medal – second place	1990 Sydney	Team competition
Champions Trophy
Gold medal – first place	1991 Berlin	Team competition
Gold medal – first place	1993 Amstelveen	Team competition
Silver medal – second place	1987 Amstelveen	Team competition
Silver medal – second place	1989 Frankfurt	Team competition

Sharon Lee Buchanan, OAM (née Patmore; (born 12 March 1963) is an Australian retired field hockey forward, who competed in three Summer Olympics for her country, starting in 1984.

Born in Busselton, Western Australia, Buchanan was inducted into the Sport Australia Hall of Fame in 1994.

As of 2008 Buchanan is married to Cairns resident Philip Reid.
