= Gill Brown =

British field hockey player

Gillian Moss
- Born: Gillian Margaret Brown; 26 February 1965 (age 61)
- Other name: GB
- Occupations: Hockey player and teacher
- Spouse: Richard Henry Moss (m. 1991)
- Children: 3 (Nicola, Megan and William Moss)

Gill Moss (née Brown) (born 26 February 1965) is a British former field hockey player who competed in the 1988 Summer Olympics.

She is currently employed as a teacher of mathematics at Alcester Grammar School, Warwickshire, UK.
