= Michelle Conn =

Canadian field hockey player

Personal information
- Full name: Michelle Conn
- Born: September 17, 1963 (age 62) Edmonton, Alberta, Canada

Sport
- Sport: Field hockey
Medal record
Women's field hockey
Representing Canada
Pan American Games
Silver medal – second place	1991 Havana	Team competition
Bronze medal – third place	1995 Mar del Plata	Team competition

Michelle "Mary" Conn (born September 17, 1963 in Edmonton, Alberta) is a former field hockey player from Canada. She represented her native country at the 1992 Summer Olympics in Barcelona, Spain. There she ended up in seventh place with the Canadian National Team, after having finished in sixth position four years earlier in Seoul, South Korea. Inducted into the Alberta Sports Hall of Fame & Museum in 2001.
