= Kim Small =

Australian field hockey player

Olympic medal record

Women's field hockey

Representing Australia
Gold medal – first place	1988 Seoul	Team competition

Kim Small (born 13 April 1965) is an Australian former field hockey player who competed in the 1988 Summer Olympics.
