= Anneloes Nieuwenhuizen =

Dutch field hockey player

Medal record

Women's field hockey

Representing the Netherlands

Olympic Games
Gold medal – first place	1984 Los Angeles	Team
Bronze medal – third place	1988 Seoul	Team

Champions Trophy
Gold medal – first place	1987 Amstelveen	Team

European Nations Cup
Gold medal – first place	1984 Lille	Team
Gold medal – first place	1987 London	Team

Anne Lucia Cornelia Maria ("Anneloes") Nieuwenhuizen (born 16 October 1963 in Bussum) is a former Dutch field hockey defender, who won the gold medal with the National Women's Team at the 1984 Summer Olympics.

Four years later in Seoul she captured the bronze medal with the national side. From 1984 to 1989 she played a total number of 87 international matches for the Netherlands, in which she did not score.
