= Michelle Hager =

Australian field hockey player

Olympic medal record

Women's field hockey

Representing Australia
Gold medal – first place	1988 Seoul	Team competition

Michelle Edith-Hager (née Capes, born 3 October 1966) is an Australian field hockey player who competed in the 1988 Summer Olympics and in the 1992 Summer Olympics. In the 1988 Summer Olympics she won a gold medal as part of the Australian national hockey team.

== Personal life ==
Michelle married fellow Australian hockey Olympian Mark Hager. Her sister Lee Capes, brother-in-law Michael Nobbs and niece Kaitlin Nobbs also represented the nation at the games.
