= Lisa Lyn =

Canadian field hockey player (born 1964)

Lisa Lyn (born 18 September 1964 in Kingston, Jamaica) is a Canadian former field hockey player who competed in the 1988 Summer Olympics.
