= Vicky Dixon =

British field hockey player

Personal information
- Full name: Victoria Jane Dixon
- Born: 5 August 1959 (age 66) Ormskirk, West Lancashire

Sport
- Sport: Field hockey
Medal record
Women's field hockey
Representing Great Britain
Olympic Games
Bronze medal – third place	1992 Barcelona	Team
Representing England
European Nations Cup
Gold medal – first place	1991 Brussels	Team
Silver medal – second place	1987 London	Team

Victoria Jane Dixon (born 5 August 1959 in Ormskirk, West Lancashire) is a former field hockey player from England, who was a member of the British squad that won the bronze medal at the 1992 Summer Olympics in Barcelona. She competed in two consecutive Summer Olympics, starting in 1988. She played for Ipswich Ladies Hockey Club.
