= Debbie Bowman-Sullivan =

Australian field hockey player (born 1963)

Personal information
- Born: 4 July 1963 (age 62) Southport, Queensland, Australia
- Height: 165 cm (5 ft 5 in)
- Weight: 57 kg (9.0 st)
Medal record
Women's Field Hockey
Representing Australia
Olympic Games
Gold medal – first place	1988 Seoul	Team competition

Deborah Ann Bowman-Sullivan (born 4 July 1963) is an Australian former field hockey defender, who won the gold medal with the Women's National Team at the 1988 Summer Olympics in Seoul, South Korea.

As captain, Bowman led the Australian Women's team to Olympic gold in Seoul in 1988. This was Australia's first ever Olympic gold medal in any team event.

In 2000, Bowman was awarded the Australian Sports Medal.

In 2009, Bowman was inducted into the Queensland Sport Hall of Fame.

== See also ==
- Field hockey at the 1988 Summer Olympics
