= Wendy Fraser =

British Field hockey player

Personal information
- Full name: Wendy Katrina Justice
- Born: 23 April 1963 (age 63) Bukoba, Kagera, Tanzania
- Height: 1.63 m (5 ft 4 in)
- Weight: 62 kg (137 lb)

Sport
- Sport: Field hockey
Medal record
Women's field hockey
Representing Great Britain
Olympic Games
Bronze medal – third place	1992 Barcelona	Team

Wendy Katrina Justice (née Fraser; born 23 April 1963 in Bukoba, Kagera, Tanzania) is a former field hockey player from Scotland, who was a member of the British squad that won the bronze medal at the 1992 Summer Olympics in Barcelona. Affiliated with Glasgow Western Ladies she competed in two consecutive Summer Olympics, starting in 1988 Summer Olympics. She currently coaches the 1XI team at Kelburne Hockey Club.
