= Elspeth Denning =

Australian field hockey player

Olympic medal record

Women's field hockey

Representing Australia
Gold medal – first place	1988 Seoul	Team competition

Elspeth Denning (OAM) (née Swain, also known as Elspeth Denning-Clement and Elspeth Clement-Denning) a former Western Australian field hockey player. She was born in Kenya on 19 June 1956 and moved with her family to South Africa when she was six. She played representative hockey for Western Province before moving to Western Australia in 1975.

As a member of the Hockeyroos, she represented Australian in 101 matches between 1978 and 1988. She was selected for Olympic squads in 1980 (Moscow), 1984 (Los Angeles) and 1988 (Seoul). In 1988 she was vice-captain in Australia's gold medal win, and was rated as the outstanding player of the meet.

In domestic hockey, Denning represented Western Australia from 1976 to 1988.

== Awards ==
In 1989 she was awarded the Order of Australia medal and was voted Western Australian Sports Star of the Year.

In 1996 she was inducted into the Western Australian Hall of Champions.

in 2005 she was inducted into the Hockey WA Hall of Champions
