= Sharon Creelman =

Canadian field hockey player

Personal information
- Full name: Sharon Grace Creelman
- Born: April 27, 1964 (age 62) Windsor, Ontario, Canada

Sport
- Sport: Field hockey
Medal record
Women's field hockey
Representing Canada
Pan American Games
| Silver medal – second place | 1991 Havana | Team competition |
| Bronze medal – third place | 1987 Indianapolis | Team competition |

Sharon Grace Creelman (born April 27, 1964, in Windsor, Ontario) is a former field hockey player from Canada. Between 1982 and 1994, Creelman held 139 caps at the Women's Senior National Team.

Creelman captained the national side from 1987 to 1994, and played in three Olympic Games (1984, 1988 and 1992) and in four World Cups (1983, 1986, 1990 and 1994). After her career Creelman became a coach in the sport of field hockey; she was the head coach of Canada's Junior Team in the late 1990s. She then became a physical education teacher at Appleby College in Oakville, Ontario.

== International senior competitions ==
- 1983 – World Cup, Kuala Lumpur (Silver Medal)
- 1984 – Olympic Games, Los Angeles (5th)
- 1986 – World Cup, Amstelveen (Bronze Medal)
- 1987 — Champions Trophy, Amstelveen (4th)
- 1987 – Pan Am Games, Indianapolis (Bronze Medal)
- 1988 – Olympic Games, Seoul (6th)
- 1990 – World Cup, Sydney (10th)
- 1991 – Pan Am Games, Havana (Silver Medal)
- 1991 – Olympic Qualifier, Auckland (3rd)
- 1992 – Olympic Games, Barcelona (7th)
- 1993 – World Cup Qualifier, Philadelphia (3rd)
- 1994 – World Cup, Dublin (10th)
