= Sara Ballantyne (field hockey) =

Canadian field hockey player

Sara Ballantyne (born 20 November 1964 in Victoria, British Columbia) is a Canadian former field hockey player who competed in the 1988 Summer Olympics.
