= Marjolein Eijsvogel =

Dutch field hockey player

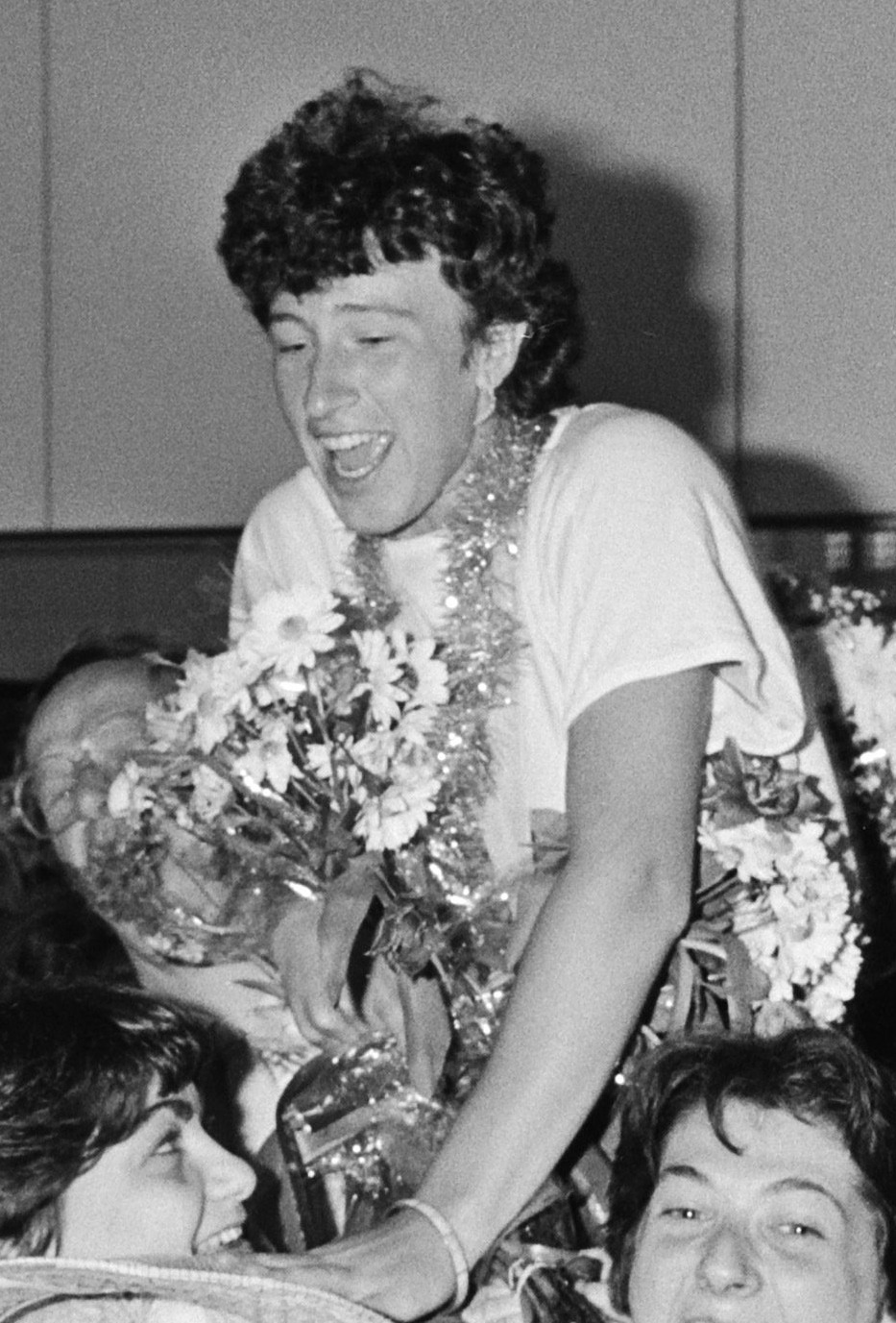
- Marjolein Eijsvogel in 1983

Personal information
- Born: 16 June 1961 (age 65) Haarlem, the Netherlands
- Height: 1.68 m (5 ft 6 in)
- Weight: 63 kg (139 lb)

Sport
- Sport: Field hockey
- Club: AH&BC, Amsterdam
Medal record
Representing the Netherlands
Olympic Games
Gold medal – first place	1984 Los Angeles	Team
Bronze medal – third place	1988 Seoul	Team
World Cup
Silver medal – second place	1981 Buenos Aires	Team
Gold medal – first place	1983 Kuala Lumpur	Team
Gold medal – first place	1986 Amstelveen	Team
Champions Trophy
Gold medal – first place	1987 Amstelveen	Team
European Nations Cup
Gold medal – first place	1987 London	Team

Maria Yolanda Caroline Gertrude "Marjolein" Bolhuis-Eijsvogel (born 16 June 1961) is a retired Dutch field hockey forward, who won a gold medal at the 1984 Summer Olympics and a bronze at the 1988 Games. From 1980 to 1988 she played 123 international matches for the Netherlands, in which she scored 56 goals.

Bolhuis-Eijsvogel is a daughter of sports journalist Hans Eijsvogel. She is married to hockey coach Peter Bolhuis, a brother of former hockey player and president of the Dutch Olympic Committee André Bolhuis.
