= Alison Ramsay =

British Olympian, field hockey player and solicitor

Personal information
- Full name: Alison Gail Ramsay
- Born: 16 April 1959 (age 67) London, England

Sport
- Sport: Field hockey
Medal record
Women's field hockey
Representing Great Britain
Olympic Games
Bronze medal – third place	1992 Barcelona	Team

Alison Gail Ramsay MBE (born 16 April 1959) is a former Scottish field hockey player, who was a member of the Great Britain and Northern Ireland squad that won the bronze medal at the 1992 Summer Olympics in Barcelona. She is one of the world's most capped women's hockey players, with over 250 appearances for Scotland and Great Britain and Northern Ireland, and received the MBE.

Ramsay enjoyed a thirteen-year international career before her retirement in 1995. She still plays for Grove Menzieshill at club level and works as a solicitor. Ramsay remains one of the most respected hockey players to have come out of Scotland, and Perthshire Hockey Club

== Honors and awards ==
Ramsay won an Olympic bronze medal with Team GB (1992, Barcelona)

Ramsay received 259 international hockey caps (150 for Scotland and 109 for GB): a world record at the time of retirement from international hockey (1995) and acknowledged in the Guinness Book of Records Now beaten by German Natascha Keller.

Ramsay was the first female player to reach 100 international GB caps

Ramsay received the prestigious MacRobert Thistle Award (1995) - The award, from National Playing Fields Association, recognises sporting achievement and high standards of conduct and integrity by those receiving it, also being an inspiration for younger generations, Other recipients: Jackie Stewart, John Greig, Sandy Carmichael, Belle Robertson, Sandy Lyle, Andy Roxburgh.

Ramsay received the MBE in Elizabeth II Birthday Honours List, 2001
