= Liane Tooth =

Australian field hockey player

Personal information
- Born: 13 March 1962 (age 64)
Medal record
Women's field hockey
Representing Australia
Olympic Games
Gold medal – first place	1988 Seoul	Team competition
Gold medal – first place	1996 Atlanta	Team competition
World Cup
Silver medal – second place	1990 Sydney	Team competition
Champions Trophy
Gold medal – first place	1991 Berlin	Team competition
Gold medal – first place	1993 Amstelveen	Team competition
Silver medal – second place	1987 Amstelveen	Team competition

Liane Marianne Tooth, OAM (born 13 March 1962 in Sydney, New South Wales) is a retired field hockey forward, who twice won the gold medal with the Australian Women's Hockey Team, best known as the Hockeyroos, at the Summer Olympics: in Seoul (1988) and in Atlanta, Georgia (1996).

Tooth was the first female hockey player to compete in four Olympic Games (1984 to 1996). She began playing field hockey at school in Sydney. Since 1994 she has devoted much of her professional life to increasing sporting opportunities and physical activity, particularly for girls and women; for the Active Women unit of the WA Department of Sport and Recreation. Most recently she has been working for the same department as an Officiating and Coaching Consultant, helping to develop officials such as referees and judges, and coaches.

She was inducted into the Sport Australia Hall of Fame in 1996. She was one of the eight flag-bearers of the Olympic Flag at the opening ceremony of the 2000 Summer Olympics in Sydney, New South Wales, Australia.

Liane is the daughter of the former Australian Wallaby and Rugby test captain Dr Richard 'Dick' Murray Tooth, a versatile and prominent back-line player, who was admired for his contribution to Australian rugby.
