= Lisanne Lejeune =

Dutch field hockey player

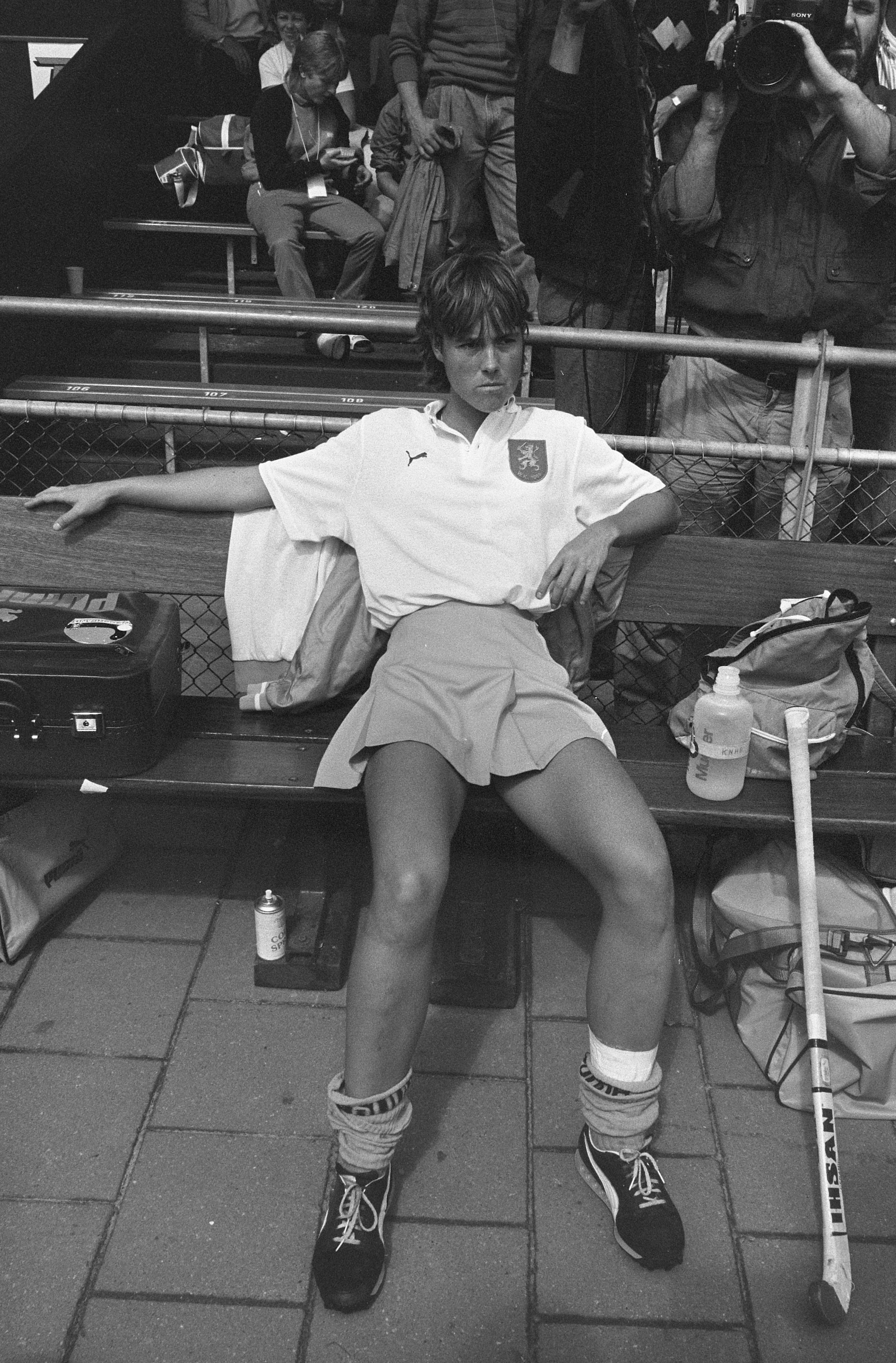
- Lisanne Lejeune in 1986

Personal information
- Born: 28 July 1963 (age 62) The Hague, the Netherlands
- Height: 1.73 m (5 ft 8 in)
- Weight: 58 kg (128 lb)

Sport
- Sport: Field hockey
- Club: HOC-Gazellen Combinatie, Wassenaar
Medal record
Representing the Netherlands
Olympic Games
Bronze medal – third place	1988 Seoul	Team
World Cup
Gold medal – first place	1990 Sydney	Team
Champions Trophy
Gold medal – first place	1987 Amstelveen	Team
European Nations Cup
Gold medal – first place	1987 London	Team

Elisabeth ("Lisanne") Anne Marie Lejeune (born 28 July 1963) is a former Dutch field hockey defender. She won a bronze medal at the 1988 Summer Olympics, world titles in 1986 and 1990, European title in 1987, and the Hockey Champions Trophy in 1987.

From 1984 to 1994 she played a total number of 95 international matches for the Netherlands, in which she scored 91 goals, most of them from penalty corners. She missed the 1992 Summer Olympics due to injury.
