= Lee Capes =

Australian field hockey player

Olympic medal record

Women's field hockey

Representing Australia
Gold medal – first place	1988 Seoul	Team competition

Lee Capes (born 3 October 1961) is an Australian former field hockey player who competed in the 1988 Summer Olympics, winning the gold medal.

Her husband Michael Nobbs (1954–2026), daughter Kaitlin Nobbs, sister Michelle Capes and brother-in-law Mark Hager have all represented their nation in the games in the same sport.
