= Kim Young-sook (field hockey) =

South Korean field hockey player

Medal record

Women's field hockey

Representing South Korea

Olympic Games
| Silver medal – second place | 1988 Seoul | Team |

Asian Games
| Gold medal – first place | 1986 Seoul | Team |

Kim Young-Sook (born 17 February 1965) is a South Korean former field hockey player who competed in the 1988 Summer Olympics.
