= Netherlands women's national field hockey team =

Women's national field hockey team representing the Netherlands

Netherlands
- Association: Dutch Hockey Confederation (Koninklijke Nederlandse Hockey Bond)
- Confederation: EHF (Europe)
- Head Coach: Raoul Ehren
- Assistant coach(es): Toon Siepman; Robert Tigges
- Manager: Fleur de Lorijn
- Captain: Marijn Veen; Renée van Laarhoven
Home	Away

FIH ranking
- Current: 1 (3 October 2026)

Olympic Games
- Appearances: 11 (first in 1984)
- Best result: (gold) 1st (1984, 2008, 2012, 2020, 2024)

World Cup
- Appearances: 16 (first in 1974)
- Best result: (gold) 1st (1974, 1978, 1983, 1986, 1990, 2006, 2014, 2018, 2022)

EuroHockey Championship
- Appearances: 17 (first in 1984)
- Best result: (gold) 1st (1984, 1987, 1995, 1999, 2003, 2005, 2009, 2011, 2017, 2019, 2021, 2023, 2025)

The Netherlands' national women's field hockey team is currently number one on the International Hockey Federation (FIH) world rankings. The Netherlands is the most successful team in World Cup history, having won the title a record nine times. The team has also won ten Olympic medals.

== Tournament records ==
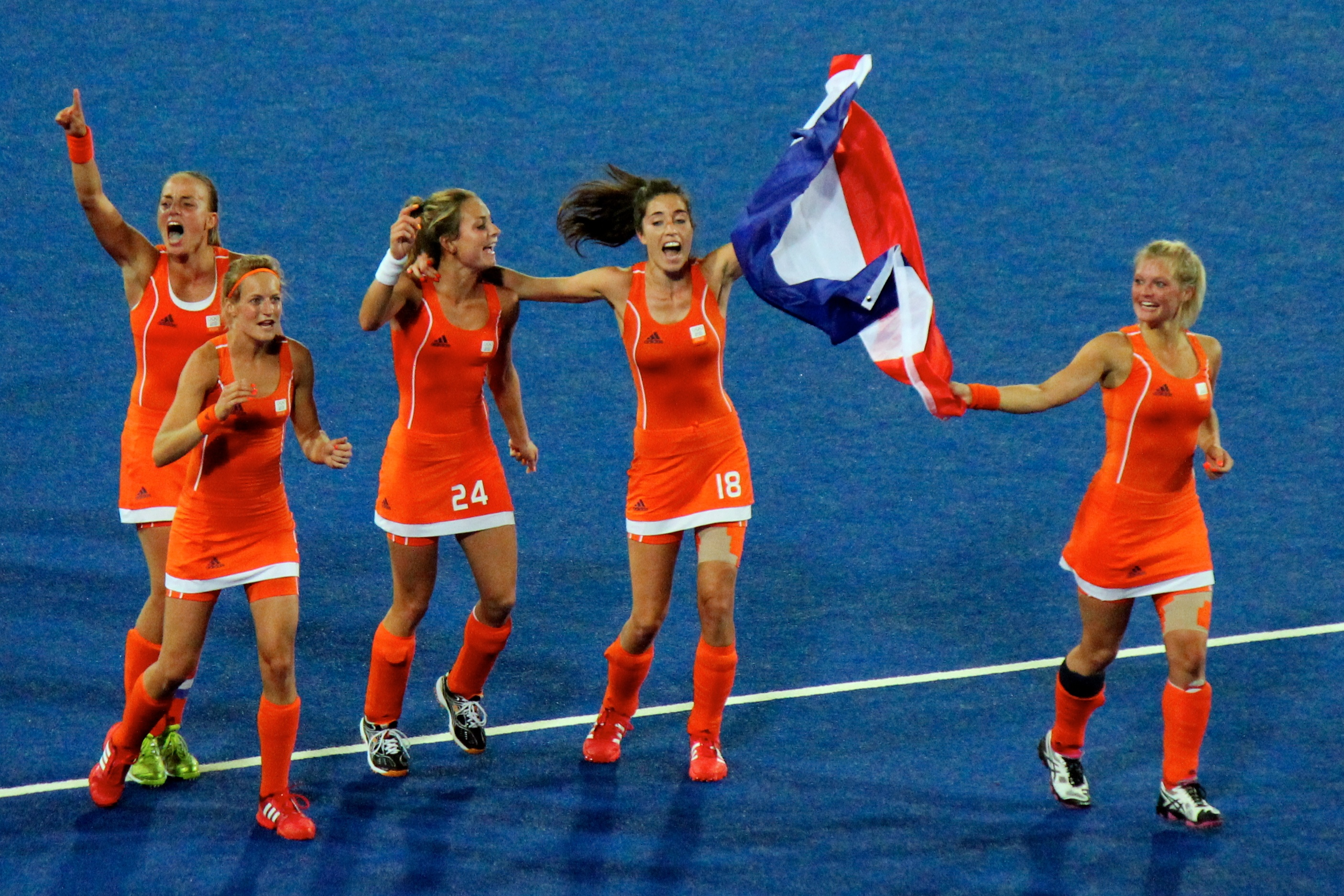
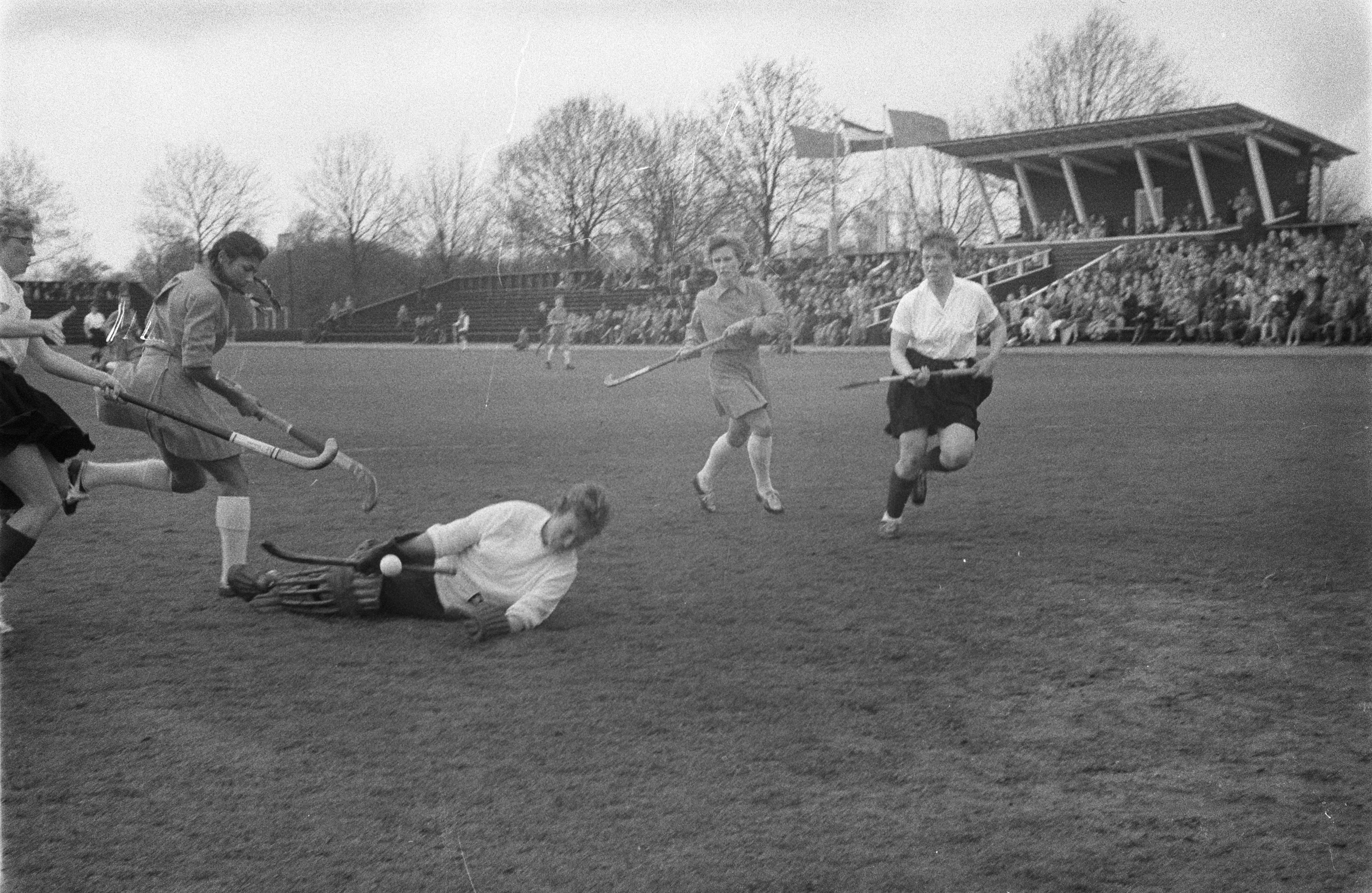
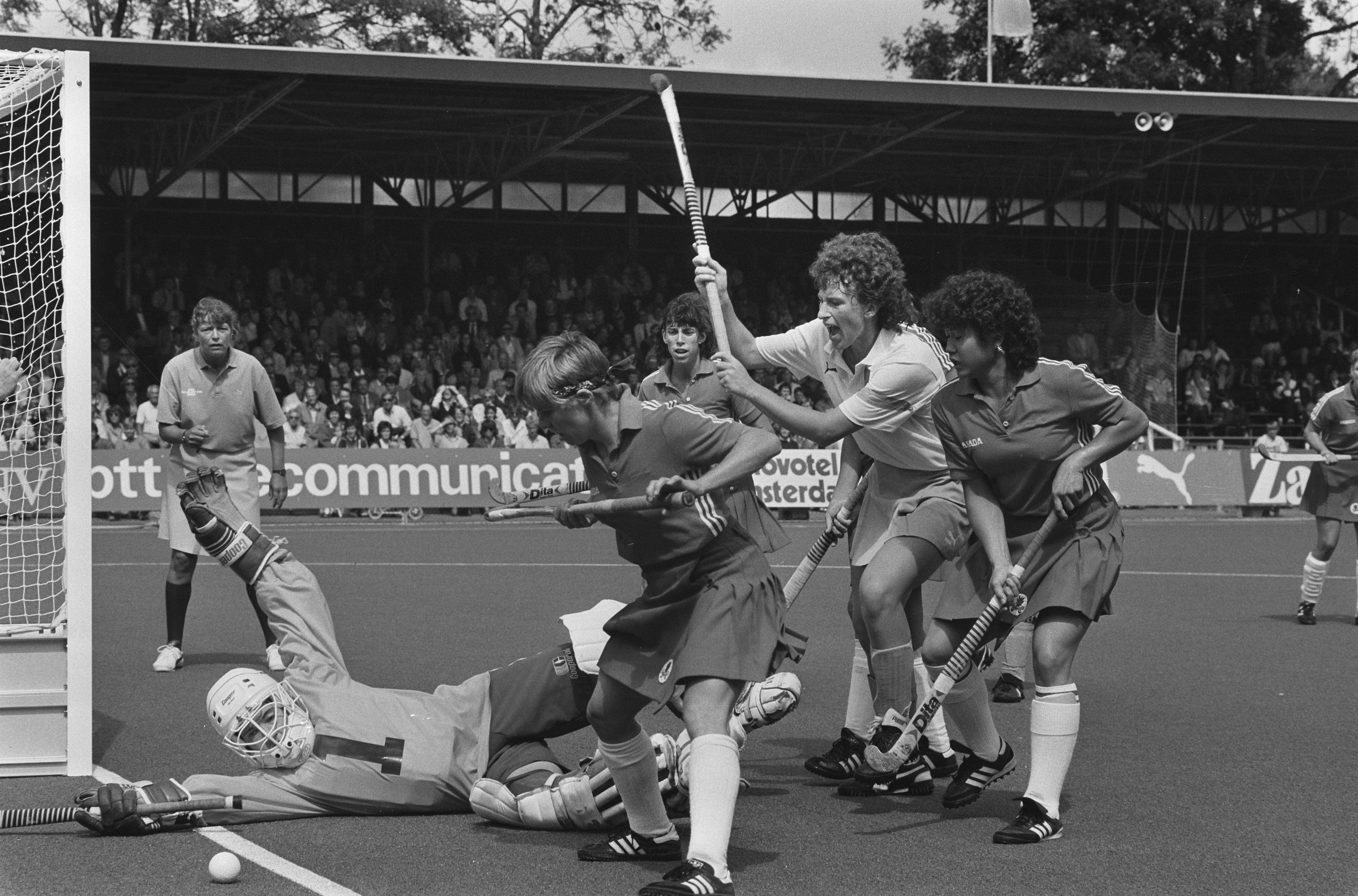
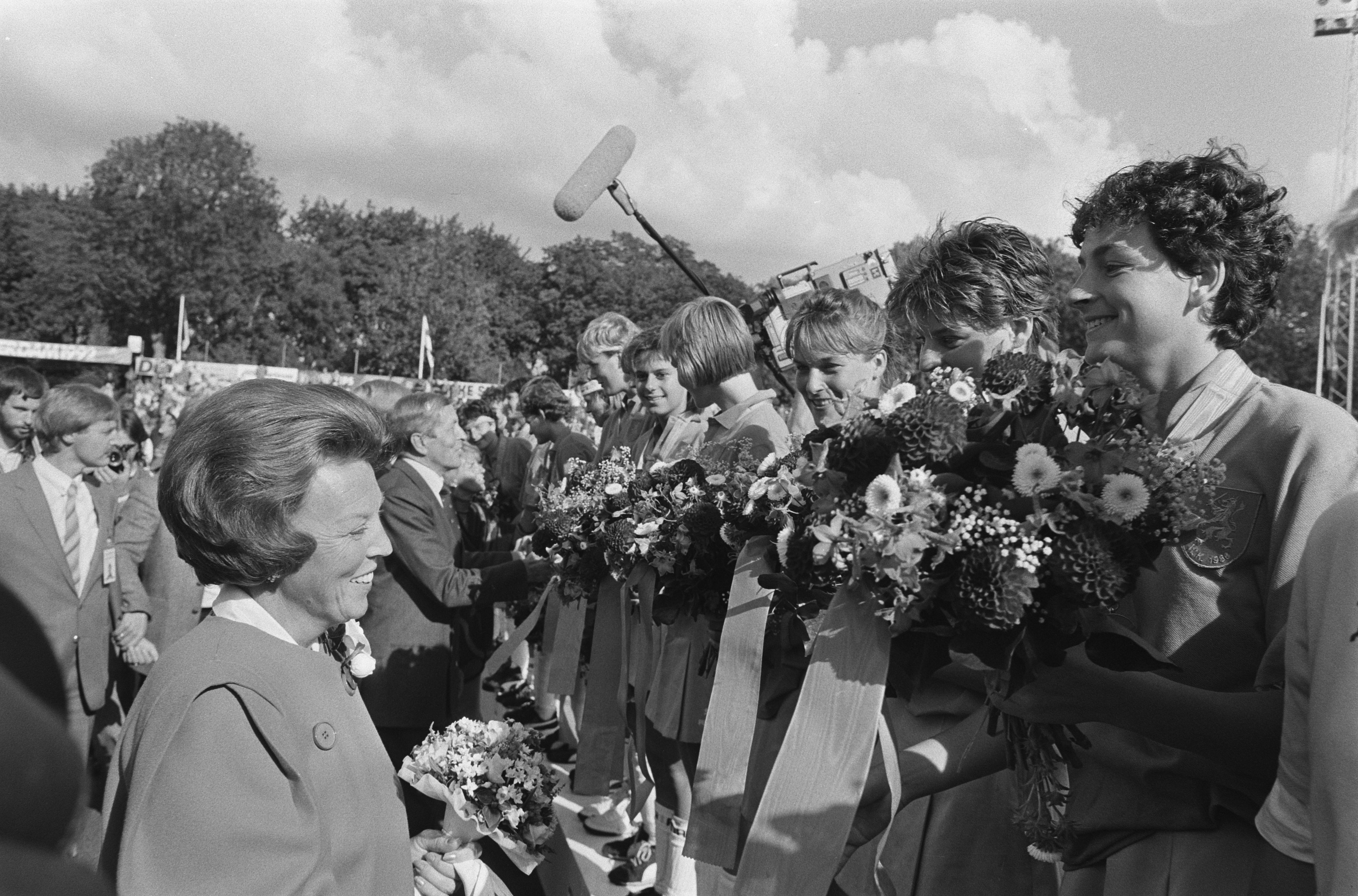
From top, left to bottom: Netherlands at the 2012 Olympic Games, in a match against Germany in 1960, 1986 Hockey World Cup: Netherlands-Canada; Marjolein Eijsvogel (r) misses goal from keeper Sharon Bayes (l) and happy with medals and cup after winning the World Cup; Her Majesty the Queen congratulates the team

FIH World Cup record
Year	Host city	Position	Pld	W	D*	L	GF	GA	Squad
1974	Mandelieu, France	1st	6	5	0	1	7	1	—N/a
1976	West Berlin, West Germany	3rd	6	5	1	0	24	3	—N/a
1978	Madrid, Spain	1st	6	6	0	0	22	3	—N/a
1981	Buenos Aires, Argentina	2nd	7	6	1	0	28	4	—N/a
1983	Kuala Lumpur, Malaysia	1st	7	6	1	0	13	4	—N/a
1986	Amsterdam, Netherlands	1st	7	6	0	1	23	8	—N/a
1990	Sydney, Australia	1st	7	6	1	0	19	1	—N/a
1994	(Republic of Ireland) Dublin, Ireland	6th	7	4	0	3	9	6	—N/a
1998	Utrecht, Netherlands	2nd	7	5	1	1	21	9	Squad
2002	Perth, Australia	2nd	9	7	2	0	24	6	Squad
2006	Madrid, Spain	1st	7	6	1	0	18	5	Squad
2010	Rosario, Argentina	2nd	7	5	1	1	27	12	Squad
2014	The Hague, Netherlands	1st	7	7	0	0	23	1	Squad
2018	London, England	1st	6	5	1	0	35	3	Squad
2022	Terrassa, Spain; Amstelveen, Netherlands	1st	6	6	0	0	17	5	Squad
2026	Wavre, Belgium; Amstelveen, Netherlands	2nd	7	6	1	0	23	4	Squad
Total	16/16	9 titles	109	91	11	7	333	75	–

Champions Trophy
Year	Host city	Position
1987	Amstelveen, Netherlands	1st
1989	Germany, West Germany	5th
1991	Berlin, Germany	3rd
1993	Amstelveen, Netherlands	2nd
1995	Mar del Plata, Argentina	DNP
1997	Berlin, Germany	3rd
1999	Brisbane, Australia	2nd
2000	Amstelveen, Netherlands	1st
2001	Amstelveen, Netherlands	2nd
2002	Macau, China	3rd
2003	Sydney, Australia	3rd
2004	Rosario, Argentina	1st
2005	Canberra, Australia	1st
2006	Amstelveen, Netherlands	3rd
2007	Quilmes, Argentina	1st
2008	Mönchengladbach, Germany	3rd
2009	Sydney, Australia	3rd
2010	Nottingham, England	2nd
2011	Amstelveen, Netherlands	1st
2012	Rosario, Argentina	3rd
2014	Mendoza, Argentina	3rd
2016	London, United Kingdom	2nd
2018	Changzhou, China	1st

Olympic Games record
Year	Host city	Position	Pld	W	D*	L	GF	GA	Squad
1980	Moscow, Soviet Union	Boycotted							
1984	Los Angeles, United States	1st	5	4	1	0	14	6	Squad
1988	Seoul, South Korea	3rd	5	4	0	1	14	6	Squad
1992	Barcelona, Spain	6th	5	3	0	2	6	5	Squad
1996	Atlanta, United States	3rd	8	3	3	2	12	11	Squad
2000	Sydney, Australia	3rd	8	3	2	3	14	18	Squad
2004	Athens, Greece	2nd	6	4	1	1	17	9	Squad
2008	Beijing, China	1st	7	7	0	0	21	5	Squad
2012	London, United Kingdom	1st	7	6	1	0	16	7	Squad
2016	Rio de Janeiro, Brazil	2nd	8	5	3	0	20	7	Squad
2020	Tokyo, Japan	1st	8	8	0	0	29	4	Squad
2024	Paris, France	1st	8	7	1	0	26	7	Squad
2028	Los Angeles, United States	Qualified							
Total	12/13	5 titles	75	54	12	9	189	85	–

EuroHockey Nations Championship
Year	Host city	Position	Pld	W	D*	L	GF	GA	Squad
1984	Lille, France	1st	7	6	0	1	24	5	–
1987	London, England	1st	7	6	1	0	33	5	–
1991	Brussels, Belgium	4th	7	4	1	2	22	6	–
1995	Amstelveen, Netherlands	1st	7	6	1	0	28	3	-
1999	Cologne, Germany	1st							-
2003	Barcelona, Spain	1st							-
2005	(Republic of Ireland) Dublin, Ireland	1st							-
2007	Manchester, England	2nd							Squad
2009	Amstelveen, Netherlands	1st							-
2011	Mönchengladbach, Germany	1st							-
2013	Boom, Belgium	3rd	5	4	1	0	19	2	Squad
2015	London, England	2nd	5	4	1	0	25	3	Squad
2017	Amstelveen, Netherlands	1st	5	5	0	0	18	1	Squad
2019	Antwerp, Belgium	1st	5	3	2	0	26	2	Squad
2021	Amstelveen, Netherlands	1st	5	5	0	0	26	2	Squad
2023	Mönchengladbach, Germany	1st	5	5	0	0	22	2	Squad
2025	Mönchengladbach, Germany	1st	5	5	0	0	18	3	Squad
2027	London, England	Qualified							

World League
Year	Position	Round	Host city	Pld	W	D*	L	GF	GA
2012–13	1st	Semifinal	Rotterdam, Netherlands	6	4	2	0	29	5
2012–13	1st	Final	San Miguel de Tucumán, Argentina	6	5	1	0	34	2
2014–15	5th	Semifinal	Antwerp, Belgium	7	7	0	0	26	1
2014–15	5th	Final	Rosario, Argentina	5	4	0	1	15	5
2016–17	1st	Semifinal	Brussels, Belgium	7	6	1	0	24	1
2016–17	1st	Final	Auckland, New Zealand	6	6	0	0	18	0
Total	2 titles	3/3	—N/a	37	32	4	1	146	14

Pro League
Year	Finals Host city	Position	Pld	W	D*	L	GF	GA
2019	Amstelveen, Netherlands	1st	18	16	1	1	45	13
2020–21	N/A	1st	12	10	1	1	35	7
2021–22	N/A	2nd	16	10	4	2	42	16
2022–23	N/A	1st	16	15	1	0	62	15
2023–24	N/A	1st	16	15	0	1	63	13
2024–25	N/A	1st	16	13	2	1	69	22
2025–26	N/A	1st	15	14	1	0	56	7
Total	7/7	6 titles	109	93	10	6	362	93

== Team ==
=== Current squad ===
The squad for the 2026 Women's FIH Hockey World Cup.

Head coach: Raoul Ehren

1. Anne Veenendaal (GK)
3. Rosa Fernig
5. Lisa Post
6. Daantje de Kruijff
7. Xan de Waard
8. Yibbi Jansen
9. Renée van Laarhoven (C)
10. Felice Albers
11. Pien Sanders
12. Luna Fokke
14. Sanne Koolen
15. Frédérique Matla
16. Joosje Burg
17. Marleen Jochems
18. Freeke Moes
19. Marijn Veen (C)
21. Pien Dicke
22. Josine Koning (GK)
34. Eline Jansen
37. Guusje Moes

=== Coaches ===
- 1965–1974 – Jo Jurissen
- 1975–1977 – Riet Küper
- 1977–1980 – Huib Timmermans
- 1980–1989 – Gijs van Heumen
- 1989–1993 – Roelant Oltmans
- 1993–1994 – Bert Wentink
- 1994–2000 – Tom van 't Hek
- 2001–2008 – Marc Lammers
- 2008–2010 – Herman Kruis
- 2010–2014 – Max Caldas
- 2014–2015 – Sjoerd Marijne
- 2015–2022 – Alyson Annan
- 2022–2022 – Jamilon Mülders (ad interim)
- 2022–2024 – Paul van Ass
- 2024–current – Raoul Ehren

=== Records ===
Highest capped players
Rank	Player	Games
1	Minke Smabers	312
2	Eva Drummond	266
3	Margot van Geffen	265
4	Fatima Moreira de Melo	258
5	Lidewij Welten	247
6	Mijntje Donners	235
7	Maartje Paumen	235
8	Ellen Hoog	233
9	Naomi van As	229
10	Minke Booij	226

Highest goalscorers
Rank	Player	Goals
1	Maartje Paumen	195
2	Fieke Boekhorst	128
3	Kim Lammers	123
4	Frédérique Matla	105
5	Wietske de Ruiter	97
6	Mijntje Donners	96
7	Lidewij Welten	95
8	Lisanne Lejeune	92
9	Yibbi Jansen	87
10	Ageeth Boomgaardt	84
10	Sophie von Weiler	84

== Results and fixtures ==
The following is a list of match results in the last 12 months, as well as any future matches that have been scheduled.

Win Draw Loss Fixture

=== 2026 ===
5 February 2026 2025–26 Women's FIH Pro League	China	0–3	Netherlands	Yunfu, China
19:30		Report	Matla 26', 41'; Jansen 57'	Stadium: Yunfu Education Park Hockey Field

6 February 2026 2025–26 Women's FIH Pro League	England	0–3	Netherlands	Yunfu, China
19:30		Report	Jansen 3', 28'; Matla 9'	Stadium: Yunfu Education Park Hockey Field

8 February 2026 2025–26 Women's FIH Pro League	China	1–6	Netherlands	Yunfu, China
17:00	Feng 58'	Report	Albers 8', 56'; Matla 13'; Veen 35', 52'; Jansen 47'	Stadium: Yunfu Education Park Hockey Field

9 February 2026 2025–26 Women's FIH Pro League	Netherlands	3–1	England	Yunfu, China
19:30	Burg 27'; Jansen 33'; Dicke 60'	Report	Bourne 13'	Stadium: Yunfu Education Park Hockey Field

13 June 2026 2025–26 Women's FIH Pro League	Netherlands	7–0	Ireland	Rotterdam, Netherlands
13:30	Waard 2'; Fokke 4', 39'; Dicke 9', 37'; Jansen 23'; Sanders 51'	Report		Stadium: Hazelaarweg Stadion

14 June 2026 2025–26 Women's FIH Pro League	Netherlands	4–0	Ireland	Rotterdam, Netherlands
13:30	Jansen 3'; Matla 8'; Burg 29'; Albers 37'	Report		Stadium: Hazelaarweg Stadion

20 June 2026 2025–26 Women's FIH Pro League	Netherlands	4–2	Spain	Rotterdam, Netherlands
13:00	Veen 7'; Moes 9'; Dicke 33'; Jansen 49'	Report	Lima 37'; Gine 60'	Stadium: Hazelaarweg Stadion

21 June 2026 2025–26 Women's FIH Pro League	Netherlands	1–0	Spain	Rotterdam, Netherlands
11:30	Albers 54'	Report		Stadium: Hazelaarweg Stadion

24 June 2026 2025–26 Women's FIH Pro League	Australia	0–6	Netherlands	Wavre, Belgium
18:30		Report	G. Moes 5'; P. Dicke 13', 33'; Matla 17'; Y. Jansen 30'; Post 54'	Stadium: Stade Justin Peeters

25 June 2026 2025–26 Women's FIH Pro League	Belgium	1–4	Netherlands	Wavre, Belgium
18:30	S. Vanden Borre 58'	Report	Y. Jansen 20'; P. Dicke 39', 46'; F. Moes 51'	Stadium: Stade Justin Peeters

27 June 2026 2025–26 Women's FIH Pro League	Netherlands	1–1 (1–3 p)	Australia	Wavre, Belgium
16:30	Matla 26'	Report	Colwill 60'	Stadium: Stade Justin Peeters
	Penalties
	Sanders (penalty shoot-out missed); Matla (penalty shoot-out missed); F. Moes (penalty shoot-out scored); Van der Elst (penalty shoot-out missed)		(penalty shoot-out scored) Kershaw; (penalty shoot-out missed) Williams; (penalty shoot-out scored) Downes; (penalty shoot-out scored) Nobbs

28 June 2026 2025–26 Women's FIH Pro League	Belgium	0–3	Netherlands	Wavre, Belgium
14:30		Report	Burg 34'; Jansen 54', 57'	Stadium: Stade Justin Peeters

30 July 2026 Friendly match 1	Netherlands	3–1	England

1 August 2026 Friendly match 2	Netherlands	1–1	Belgium

15 August 2026 World Cup Pool A	Netherlands	2–0	Chile	Amstelveen, Netherlands
16:00	Veen 23'; Jansen 35'	Report		Stadium: Wagener Stadium

17 August 2026 World Cup Pool A	Australia	2–4	Netherlands	Amstelveen, Netherlands
18:00	Kershaw 23'; Wilson 49'	Report	Jansen 13'; Burg 22', 52'; Veen 56'	Stadium: Wagener Stadium

19 August 2026 World Cup Pool A	Netherlands	9–0	Japan	Amstelveen, Netherlands
18:00	Y. Jansen 5', 23', 25', 51'; Veen 15', 34'; Albers 21', 53'; Matla 46'	Report		Stadium: Wagener Stadium

21 August 2026 World Cup Pool E	Netherlands	2–0	India	Amstelveen, Netherlands
18:00	Y. Jansen 2'; Matla 38'	Report		Stadium: Wagener Stadium

23 August 2026 World Cup Pool E	Netherlands	4–1	China	Amstelveen, Netherlands
16:00	Moes 10'; Albers 11'; Burg 22'; Veen 28'	Report	Zhang 24'	Stadium: Wagener Stadium

27 August 2026 World Cup Semi final	Netherlands	1–0	Belgium	Amstelveen, Netherlands
18:00	Matla 28'	Report		Stadium: Wagener Stadium

29 August 2026 World Cup Final	Netherlands	1–1 (1–3 p)	Argentina	Amstelveen, Netherlands
16:00	Y. Jansen 30'	Report	M. Granatto 54'	Stadium: Wagener Stadium
	Penalties
	Sanders (penalty shoot-out missed); Albers (penalty shoot-out missed); Veen (penalty shoot-out scored); Moes (penalty shoot-out missed)		(penalty shoot-out scored) V. Granatto; (penalty shoot-out scored) Bruggesser; (penalty shoot-out missed) Díaz; (penalty shoot-out scored) Cairo

== See also ==
- Netherlands men's national field hockey team
- Netherlands women's national under-21 field hockey team
