= 1987 Women's EuroHockey Nations Championship =

International field hockey competition

Tournament details
- Host country: England
- City: London
- Dates: 3–13 September
- Teams: 12 (from 1 confederation)

Final positions
- Champions: Netherlands (2nd title)
- Runner-up: England
- Third place: Soviet Union

Tournament statistics
- Matches played: 42
- Top scorer: (Netherlands) Lisanne Lejeune (14 goals)

The 1987 Women's EuroHockey Nations Championship was the second edition of the Women's EuroHockey Nations Championship, the quadrennial international women's field hockey championship of Europe organized by the European Hockey Federation. It was held at the Picketts Lock in London, England from 3 to 13 September 1987.

The defending champions the Netherlands won their second title by defeating the hosts England 3–1 in penalty strokes after the match finished 2–2 after extra time. The Soviet Union won the bronze medal by defeating West Germany 2–1.

== Preliminary round ==
=== Pool A ===
Pos	Team	Pld	W	D	L	GF	GA	GD	Pts	Qualification
1	Netherlands	5	5	0	0	29	2	+27	10	Semi-finals
2	Soviet Union	5	4	0	1	23	6	+17	8	Semi-finals
3	Scotland	5	3	0	2	11	10	+1	6	
4	Wales	5	1	0	4	3	12	−9	2	
5	France	5	1	0	4	4	16	−12	2	
6	Belgium	5	1	0	4	2	26	−24	2	

3 September 1987
Netherlands	5–0	France
Soviet Union	3–0	Wales
Scotland	5–0	Belgium
4 September 1987
Netherlands	9–1	Belgium
Soviet Union	4–1	Scotland
Wales	3–0	France
6 September 1987
Belgium	1–0	Wales
Soviet Union	6–0	France
Netherlands	5–0	Scotland
7 September 1987
Netherlands	5–1	Soviet Union
Scotland	3–0	Wales
France	3–0	Belgium
9 September 1987
Netherlands	5–0	Wales
Soviet Union	9–0	Belgium
Scotland	2–1	France

=== Pool B ===
Pos	Team	Pld	W	D	L	GF	GA	GD	Pts	Qualification
1	England (H)	5	4	1	0	23	3	+20	9	Semi-finals
2	West Germany	5	3	1	1	16	3	+13	7	Semi-finals
3	Spain	5	3	0	2	16	8	+8	6	
4	Ireland	5	3	0	2	11	5	+6	6	
5	Italy	5	1	0	4	3	30	−27	2	
6	Austria	5	0	0	5	2	22	−20	0	

(H) Hosts

3 September 1987
England	5–1	Austria
West Germany	8–0	Italy
Ireland	2–0	Spain
5 September 1987
England	1–1	West Germany
Spain	6–0	Austria
Ireland	7–0	Italy
6 September 1987
Ireland	2–1	Austria
Spain	2–0	West Germany
England	8–0	Italy
8 September 1987
England	6–1	Spain
West Germany	1–0	Ireland
Italy	3–0	Austria
9 September 1987
England	3–0	Ireland
West Germany	6–0	Austria
Spain	7–0	Italy

== Classification round ==
=== Ninth to twelfth place classification ===
9–12th place semi-finals
11 September
France	3
Austria	1
11 September
Belgium	2
Italy	1

Ninth place
12 September
Belgium (a.e.t.)	2
France	1
Eleventh place
12 September
Italy	1
Austria	0

=== Fifth to eighth place classification ===
5–8th place semi-finals
11 September
Spain	6
Wales	0
11 September
Scotland	2
Ireland	1

Fifth place
12 September
Spain	2
Scotland	1
Seventh place
12 September
Ireland	3
Wales	1

=== First to fourth place classification ===
Semi-finals
11 September
Netherlands	2
West Germany	1
11 September
England	2
Soviet Union	1

Final
13 September
Netherlands (p.s.o.)	2 (3)
England	2 (1)
Third place
13 September
Soviet Union	2
West Germany	1

== Final standings ==
1. Netherlands
2. England
3. Soviet Union
4. West Germany
5. Spain
6. Scotland
7. Ireland
8. Wales
9. Belgium
10. France
11. Italy
12. Austria

== See also ==
- 1987 Men's EuroHockey Nations Championship
