= List of Old Boys of Trinity College, Perth =

Old Boys of Trinity College are former students of Trinity College, Perth (1962–present) and CBC Perth (1938–1961). See List of Old Aquinians for the period 1894–1937 and St Patrick's Boy School, Perth (1878–1963).

== Government ==
=== Head of government ===
- Ray O'Connor (1926–2013) – Premier of Western Australia (St Patrick's Boys School, Perth)

=== Executive branch ===
Cabinet

- Graham Edwards – Dowding Ministry 1987–1990, Lawrence Ministry 1990–1993, MLC for North Metropolitan, also elected to APH for Cowan (CBC Perth)
- Chris Ellison – First, Second, Third and Fourth Howard Ministries, Australian Senator for Western Australia
- Nick Griffiths – First Gallop Ministry 2001–2005, President of the Western Australian Legislative Council, MLC for East Metropolitan
- John Harman (1932–1998) – Second Tonkin Ministry 1973–1974, Speaker of the Legislative Assembly 1983–1986, MLA for Maylands (St Patrick's Boys School, Perth)

Other executive

- Michael Keenan – Abbott Ministry, First and Second Turnbull Ministries, MHR for Stirling
- Chris Tallentire – First McGowan Ministry 2017, MLA for Gosnells

=== Legislative branch ===
- Matt Benson-Lidholm – MLC for Agricultural, Deputy President of the Legislative Council and Chairman of Committees
- Vince Catania – MLA for North West Central, MLC for Mining and Pastoral, Acting Speaker of the Legislative Assembly 2008
- Tim Hammond SC – MHR for Perth

=== Judicial branch ===
- Jeremy Allanson – Justice of the Supreme Court of Western Australia

=== Public service ===
- William Foley (1931–1991) – Archbishop of Perth (CBC Perth)
- Launcelot Goody (1908–1992) – Archbishop of Perth (CBC Perth and also attended St Patrick's Boys School, Perth)
- Lloyd Rayney – leading prosecutor and defence barrister acquitted of the high-profile murder of his wife Corryn Rayney

== Academia and science ==
=== Chancellors ===
- Peter Tannock – Vice-Chancellor, University of Notre Dame Australia, Chairman of the National Catholic Education Commission (CBC Perth)
- John Yovich – Vice Chancellor, Murdoch University

=== Chairs ===
- Peter Steele (1939–2012) – Professor of English Literature, University of Melbourne (CBC Perth)
- Peter Tannock – Professor & Dean of Education, University of Western Australia (CBC Perth)

=== Others academia and science ===
- Bruce Maslin – botanist

== Art, entertainment and media ==
- Chris Allen – author
- Dave Faulkner – musician, Hoodoo Gurus
- Jason Gilkison – ballroom dancer and choreographer
- Alisdair McLaren – world champion bagpipe player
- Jeff Phillips – TV show host, personality and pop singer, 1970 Logie award for best new talent
- Alan Pigram – Scrap Metal & The Pigram Brothers – West Australian Music Hall of Fame
- Colin Pigram – The Pigram Brothers
- David Pigram – The Pigram Brothers – West Australian Music Hall of Fame
- Philip Pigram – Scrap Metal & The Pigram Brothers
- Stephen Pigram – Scrap Metal & The Pigram Brothers
- Mark Readings – STW Channel 9 sports presenter, radio sports commentator, 2003 Logie award for best news coverage of Bali Bombings
- Joseph Ryan – musician, Pond

== Business ==
- Warren Anderson – speculative investor (CBC Perth)
- Glen Bartlett – Melbourne Football Club President (see VFL under Sport)
- Michael Edgley – Managing Director Edgley International (CBC Perth)

== Sport ==
=== Athletics ===
- John Goodman – Melbourne 1956 silver medal 4 × 400 m relay Australia (CBC Perth)
- John Steffensen – Athens 2004 silver medal 4 × 400 m relay Australia, Beijing 2008, and London 2012 (also attended Guildford Grammar School)

=== Australian rules football ===
AFL

- Jacob Brennan – West Coast Eagles
- Michael Brennan – West Coast Eagles 1992 & 1994 vice-captain and premiership player
- Travis Colyer – Essendon
- Reece Conca – Richmond
- Mitch Duncan – Geelong 2011 premiership player (also attended Carine Senior High School)
- Andrew Embley – West Coast Eagles 2006 vice-captain, premiership player and Norm Smith Medal, Australian representative
- Alex Fasolo – Collingwood
- Jeff Garlett – Carlton and Melbourne
- Evan Hewitt – North Melbourne Kangaroos and Adelaide
- Josh Hill – Western Bulldogs and West Coast Eagles
- Jarrhan Jacky – Adelaide
- Kane Lucas – Carlton
- Paul Maher – Fremantle
- Nic Martin – Essendon
- Patrick McGinnity – West Coast Eagles
- Fraser McInnes – West Coast Eagles
- Murray Newman – West Coast Eagles
- David O'Connell – West Coast Eagles and Fitzroy
- David Ogg – Brisbane Bears
- Ashley Sampi – West Coast Eagles, Mark of the Year 2004
- Matthew Spencer – Geelong
- Lewis Stevenson – West Coast Eagles
- Luke Webster – Fremantle and assistant coach at Carlton and West Coast Eagles
- Sharrod Wellingham – Collingwood 2010 premiership player and West Coast Eagles

Others, Australian rules football

VFL

- Glen Bartlett – West Coast Eagles and WA state representative
- Ramsay Bogunovich – Geelong
- Craig Holden – North Melbourne, Sydney, WA state representative, Australian representative, All Australian 1987
- Gary Malarkey – Geelong, Victorian and WA state representative, All Australian 1979 – WA Football Hall of Fame 2010
- John O'Connell – Geelong captain, WA state representative – WA Football Hall of Fame 2012 (CBC Perth)
- Michael O'Connell – West Coast Eagles

WAFL

- Barry Kimberley – Swan Districts premiership player & Simpson Medal 1984
- Terry Moriarty – Perth, Sandover Medal 1943 – WA Football Hall of Fame 2010 (St Patrick's Boys School and also attended Aquinas College)
- Peter Tannock – East Perth, WA state representative, first Chairman of the WA Football Commission, co-founder of West Coast Eagles as Chairman of WA Football Development Trust (CBC Perth)

=== Bobsleigh ===
- Duncan Pugh – Vancouver 2010

=== Cricket ===
Australian Test Cricketers

- Beau Casson
- Simon Katich
- Mick Malone
- Craig Serjeant – vice captain
- Tim Zoehrer

Others, cricket

- Harry Gorringe – first-class Western Australia (CBC Perth)
- Dimitri Mascarenhas – England international cricketer

=== Cycling ===
- Henk Vogels Jr – Barcelona 1992 and Sydney 2000

=== Hockey ===
- John Bestall – Seoul 1988, & Barcelona 1992 silver medal Australia
- Kevin Carton – Australian captain (CBC Perth)
- Maurice Foley – Melbourne 1956 (CBC Perth)
- Eric Pearce – Tokyo 1964 bronze medal Australia & Mexico 1968 silver medal Australia – Australian Sport Hall of Fame 1985 (CBC Perth)
- Gordon Pearce – Mexico 1968 silver medal Australia (CBC Perth)
- Julian Pearce – Rome 1960, Tokyo 1964 bronze medal Australia, & Mexico 1968 silver medal Australia – Australian Sport Hall of Fame 1999 (CBC Perth)
- Mel Pearce – Melbourne 1956 (CBC Perth)

=== Motorsport ===
Supercars

- Alex Rullo – as a 15 year old Trinity student, became the youngest V8 Supercar driver in the competition history

=== Rowing ===
- Kenneth Chan – World Rowing Championships: 2000 men's lightweight eight bronze medal Australia
- Jack Cleary – Tokyo 2021 bronze
- Ben Cureton – Athens 2004 silver medal men's coxless four Australia, Beijing 2008, London 2012
- Rhys Grant – Rio de Janeiro 2016 men's single sculls
- Stefan Szczurowski – Sydney 2000, & Athens 2004 bronze medal men's eight Australia
- David Watts – Rio de Janeiro 2016 men's double sculls (also attended Churchlands Senior High School)

=== Soccer ===
- Matthew Davies – Malaysian international footballer, captain of Pahang FA, & Perth Glory
- Shaun Murphy – Socceroos 2001 Confederation Cup & famously scored the winner against Brazil, Notts County 1992–1997, West Bromwich Albion 1997–1999, Sheffield United 1999–2003. Crystal Palace 2001–2002, & Perth Glory captain 2003–2004

=== Swimming ===
- Jeremy McClure – Athens Paralympics 2004, Beijing Paralympics 2008, London Paralympics 2012, & Rio de Janeiro Paralympics 2016
- Antony Matkovich – Athens 2004 silver medal 4 × 200 m freestyle relay Australia
- Travis Nederpelt – Athens 2004 & Beijing 2008

=== Water polo ===
- Antony Matkovich – Sharks, Australian men's water polo team

== See also ==
- List of schools in Western Australia
- Public Schools Association
