= May Campbell (field hockey) =

Australian field hockey player and coach (1915-1981)

May Emma Campbell MBE
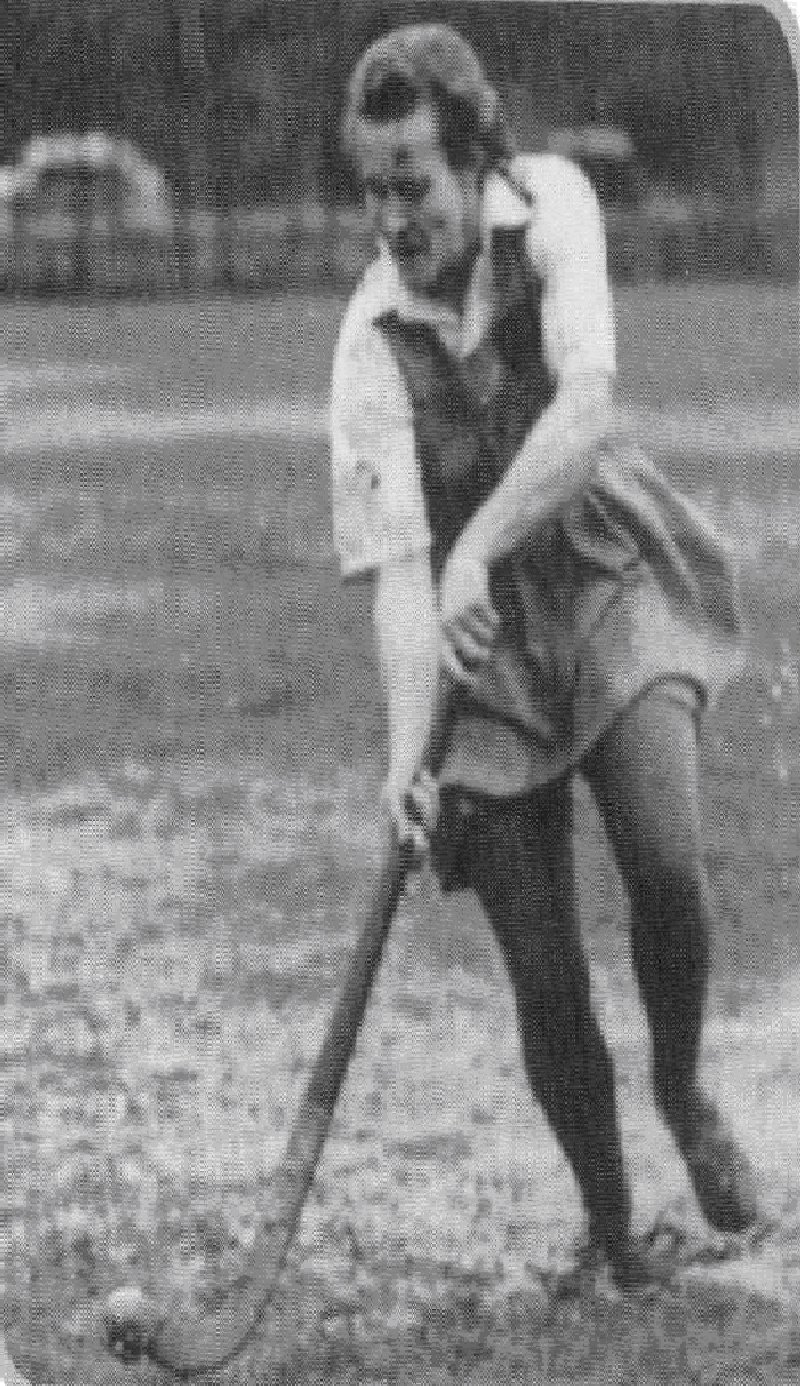
- May Campbell in the 1940s
- Born: 2 November 1915; Wagin, Western Australia
- Died: 16 February 1981 (aged 65)
- Other name: May Pearce
- Known for: Field hockey player and coach

May Emma Campbell (née Pearce) MBE (2 November 1915 – 16 February 1981) was a field hockey player who represented Australia in the sport from 1935 to 1948. From the wheatbelt town of Moulyinning, her career spanned 50 years as a player, coach, selector, and administrator in several Australian states as well as national duties. She was considered one of Western Australia's and Australia's greatest players, with Indian champion Dhyan Chand saying of her: "May Campbell is one of the finest players I have seen, man or woman."

== Early life ==
Campbell played local hockey with Surf Hockey Club (now YMCA Coastal City Hockey Club) with sisters Jean Pearce Wynne (also played for Australia from 1946 to 1953), Morna Pearce Hyde (played for Australia in the late 1940s), and Caroline "Tib" Pearce Ash. May, Jean, and Norma all captained the Australian Women's hockey team and the state team at various times; Tib also played at State and national levels.

Her brother Corporal Joe Pearce was a prisoner of war during World War II for over two years. He survived the war and returned to Australia.

John Hyde, MLA for Perth, is Morna Pearce's son and, hence, May's nephew.

During the 1950s and 1960s, there were also five brothers with the name Pearce—Cec, Mel, Eric, Gordon, and Julian Pearce—who were prominent hockey players in Western Australia and Australia who were unrelated to the Pearce sisters.

== Career ==
Campbell worked on the teaching staff of Richmond School in Perth. In 1936, Campbell's local community in Moulyinning helped to fundraise £215 to enable her to join the All-Australian team and compete in a tournament in the United States and Canada. The town hosted a gathering, filling the Moulyinning town hall to present her with the funds and wish her farewell. Early in her travels, Campbell wrote a letter that was reported in the paper about her time in Fiji. She wrote that she had been unwell with boils and confined to her berth for the first part of the journey. She said that only five members of the team were able to make it to the dining saloon for the first few nights due to sea sickness from the rocking ship.

Campbell's 1936 teammates consisted of fellow Western Australian Jean Fitch; Victorians Girlie Hodges, Margaret Knight, E. Florence Faul, and Dorothy Sholl; Tasmanians Lucy Winspear and Connie Charlesworth; South Australians Jean Mackey and Mabel Cashmore; New South Welshman Ena Macrae; and the captain of the team Merle Taylor from Victoria, and vice captain E.Tezwell from South Australia.

Campbell was Australia's highest goal scorer, with 69 of Australia's 188 goals. Australia won 16 of their 19 games.

In addition to touring England and New Zealand, Campbell scored 100 goals in club, national, and international matches. In 1938, she scored 20 of WA's 30 goals in the National Championships. During her many years as Western Australian captain, the state failed to win the national title only twice.

In 1943, she married Archie Campbell, an AFL player and member of the AIF during World War II, stationed in Timor.

Campbell coached the Western Australian state team for many years, during which the team only lost the national title twice. She also coached and managed the Australian team. Her influence on women's hockey further extended to Queensland, New South Wales, and Victoria through coaching in those states. For 50 years, Campbell was dedicated to hockey as a player, coach, and administrator.

== Awards ==
- Campbell was made a member of the Order of the British Empire (Civil) in the 1981 New Year Honours for services to Hockey.
- During the WAY 1979 celebrations, Campbell was named as the all-time great of women's hockey.
- Campell was inducted into the Western Australian Hall of Champions in 1986.
- The May Campbell Medal is awarded annually to people who have displayed outstanding service to sport in the state either through competition, officiating, administration and coaching.
