= Western Australian Sports Star of the Year =

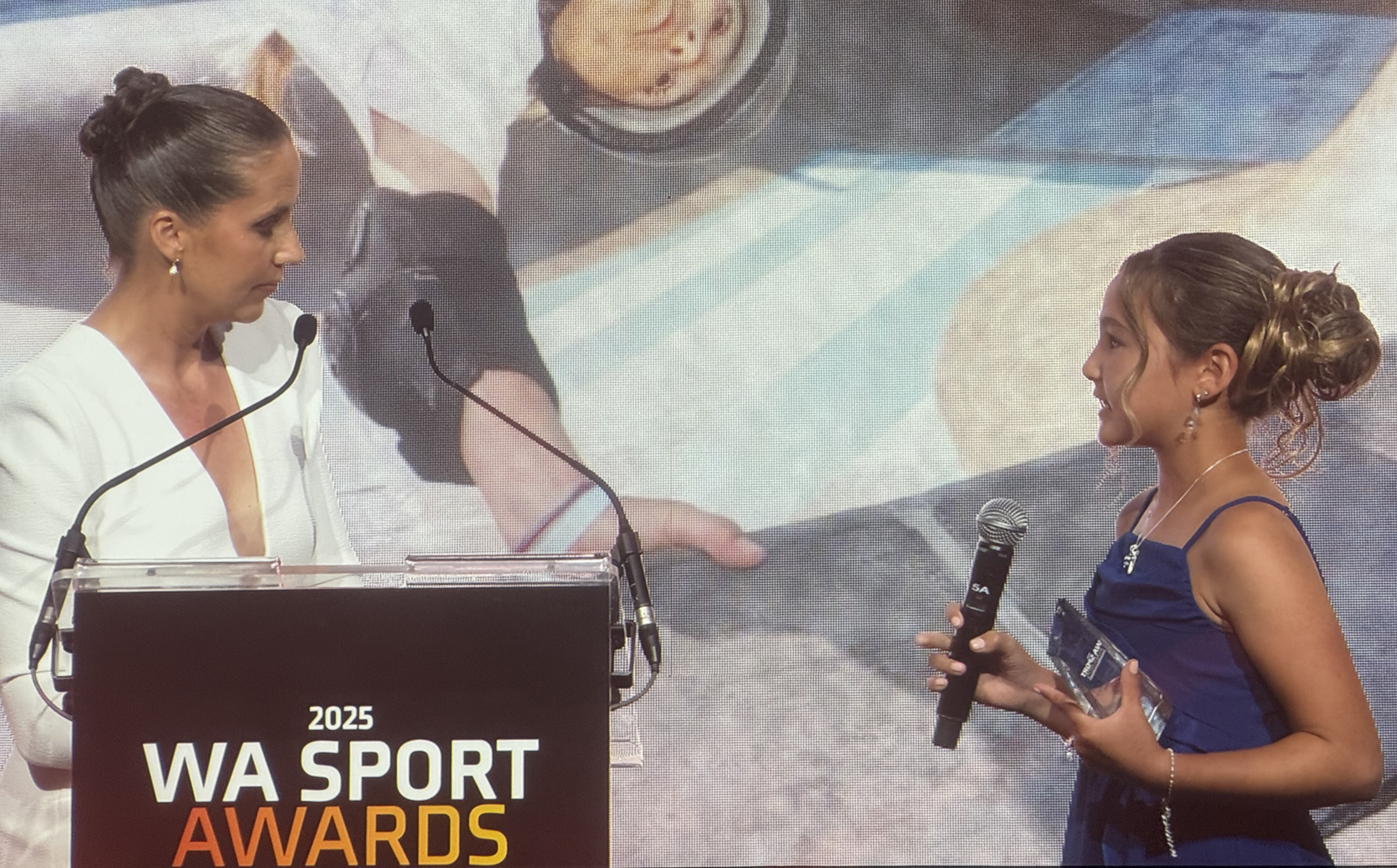
Ashleigh Nelson interviewing skateboarder Mia Kretzer (Junior Sports Star) at the 2025 WA Sport Awards

The Western Australian Sports Star Award, currently presented at the WA Sport Awards, is an annual award for sportspeople from the Australian state of Western Australia and/or playing for teams based in Western Australia. It has been running since 1956 and has grown to celebrate sport in the West Australian community along with high-performance achievements that have been part of the tradition of the Awards.

The award has had several multiple winners. Cricketer Dennis Lillee won the award five times (1971, 1972, 1975, 1976, and 1981), and is the only person to win the award in consecutive years on two separate occasions. Another cricketer, Rod Marsh, was the second person to win the award four times (1972, 1973, 1974, and 1981), and is the only person to win the award in three consecutive years. Golfer Graham Marsh (1973, 1977, 1985, and 1986) and hockey player Ric Charlesworth (1976, 1979, 1986, and 1987) also won the award four times, while swimmer David Dickson (1961, 1963, and 1966) and tennis player Margaret Court (1969, 1970, and 1973) won the award three times.

Cricket has produced the most winners of the award, with thirteen winners. Twelve athletes and nine swimmers have won the award, as well as eight footballers, six cyclists, and six hockey players. The most recent edition of the WA Sport Awards was presented in February 2026 for the year of 2025.

== List of winners by year ==
Year	Winner	Sport
1956	Morna Pearce	Hockey
1957	Shirley de la Hunty	Athletics
1958	Herb Elliott	Athletics
1959	Brian Foley	Australian rules football
1960	Bob Simpson	Cricket
1961	David Dickson	Swimming
1962	Bob Marshall	Billiards
1962	Dixie Willis	Athletics
1962	Haydn Bunton, Jr.	Australian rules football
1963	David Dickson (2)	Swimming
1963	Bob Marshall (2)	Billiards
1963	Joyce Bennett	Athletics
1964	Graham McKenzie	Cricket
1965	John Ryan	Swimming
1965	Peter Kelly	Cricket
1965	Bill Walker	Australian rules football
1966	David Dickson (3)	Swimming
1966	Phil Coulson	Harness racing
1967	Brian Griffin	Lacrosse
1967	Bill Walker (2)	Australian rules football
1967	Lynne Watson	Swimming
1968	Brian Glencross	Hockey
1968	Lyn McClements	Swimming
1969	Syd Lodge	Yachting
1969	Margaret Court	Tennis
1970	Margaret Court (2)	Tennis
1971	Dennis Lillee	Cricket
1971	Gaye Switch	Netball
1972	Dennis Lillee (2)	Cricket
1972	Rod Marsh	Cricket
1973	Margaret Court (3)	Tennis
1973	Roslyn Fisher	Hockey
1973	Rod Marsh (2)	Cricket
1973	Graham Marsh	Golf
1974	Rod Marsh (3)	Cricket
1974	Rob O'Sullivan	Yachting
1975	John Gilmour	Athletics
1975	Libby Felton	Rifle shooting
1975	Dennis Lillee (3)	Cricket
1976	Ric Charlesworth	Hockey
1976	Dennis Lillee (4)	Cricket
1977	Graham Marsh (2)	Golf
1977	Dean Williams	Squash
1978	Rob O'Sullivan (2)	Yachting
1978	Barbara Wall	Squash
1979	Ric Charlesworth (2)	Hockey
1979	Kim Hughes	Cricket
1979	Barbara Wall (2)	Squash
1980	Kim Hughes (2)	Cricket
1980	Lou Austin	Harness Racing
1981	Rod Marsh (4)	Cricket
1981	Sue Roberts	Powerlifting
1981	Terry Alderman	Cricket
1981	Dennis Lillee (5)	Cricket
1982	Neil Brooks	Swimming
1983	Steele Bishop	Cycling
1984	Graham Lillingston	Yachting
1984	Peter Evans	Swimming
1984	Steve Malaxos	Australian rules football
1985	Elizabeth Smylie	Tennis
1985	Graham Marsh (3)	Golf
1986	Ric Charlesworth (3)	Hockey
1986	Geoff Marsh	Cricket
1986	Graham Marsh (4)	Golf
1987	Peter Gilmour	Yachting
1987	Thomas Stachewicz	Swimming
1987	Ric Charlesworth (4)	Hockey
1988	Elspeth Clement	Hockey
1989	Terry Alderman (2)	Cricket
1990	Bruce Reid	Cricket
1990	Ian Brown	Swimming
1991	Roger Mackay	Golf
1991	Shelley Taylor-Smith	Swimming
1992	Craig Parry	Golf
1992	Ramon Andersson	Canoeing
1992	Peter Matera	Australian rules football
1993	Ramon Andersson (2)	Canoeing
1993	Dean Capobianco	Athletics
1994	Darryn Hill	Cycling
1995	Darryn Hill (2)	Cycling
1996	Luc Longley	Basketball
1996	Rob Scott	Rowing
1997	Luc Longley (2)	Basketball
1998	Lucy Tyler-Sharman	Cycling
1999	Justin Langer	Cricket
2000	Rechelle Hawkes	Hockey
2001	Dmitri Markov	Athletics
2002	Simon Black	Australian rules football
2003	Adam Gilchrist	Cricket
2003	Peter Dawson	Cycling
2004	Ryan Bayley	Cycling
2005	Ben Cousins	Australian rules football
2005	Robin Bell	Canoeing
2006	Paul Burgess	Pole vault
2007	Michael Hussey	Cricket
2008	Steve Hooker	Pole vault
2009	Steve Hooker (2)	Pole vault
2010	Lauren Mitchell	Gymnastics
2011	Cameron Meyer	Cycling
2012	Cameron Meyer (2)	Cycling
2013	Kim Mickle	Javelin
2014	Mitchell Johnson	Cricket
2015	Nat Fyfe	Australian rules football
2016	Curtis Luck	Golf
2017	Sam Kerr	Soccer
2018	Sam Kerr (2)	Soccer
2019	Nat Fyfe (2)	Australian rules football
2019	Hannah Green	Golf
2020	Jai Hindley	Cycling
2021	Madison de Rozario	Athletics
2022	Jai Hindley (2)	Cycling
2023	Sam Kerr (3)	Soccer
2024	Nina Kennedy	Athletics
2025	Minjee Lee	Golf

== List of winners by sport ==
Sport	Winners
Athletics	Shirley de la Hunty, Herb Elliott, Dixie Willis, Joyce Bennett, John Gilmour, Dean Capobianco, Dmitri Markov, Paul Burgess, Steve Hooker, Kim Mickle, Madison de Rozario, Nina Kennedy
Australian rules football	Brian Foley, Haydn Bunton, Jr., Bill Walker, Steve Malaxos, Peter Matera, Simon Black, Ben Cousins, Nat Fyfe
Basketball	Luc Longley
Billiards	Bob Marshall
Canoeing	Ramon Andersson, Robin Bell
Cricket	Bob Simpson, Graham McKenzie, Peter Kelly, Dennis Lillee, Rod Marsh, Kim Hughes, Terry Alderman, Geoff Marsh, Bruce Reid, Justin Langer, Adam Gilchrist, Michael Hussey, Mitchell Johnson
Cycling	Steele Bishop, Darryn Hill, Lucy Tyler-Sharman, Peter Dawson, Ryan Bayley, Cameron Meyer, Jai Hindley
Golf	Roger MacKay, Graham Marsh, Craig Parry, Curtis Luck, Hannah Green, Minjee Lee
Gymnastics	Lauren Mitchell
Harness racing	Phil Coulson, Lou Austin
Hockey	Morna Pearce, Brian Glencross, Roslyn Fisher, Ric Charlesworth, Elspeth Clement, Rechelle Hawkes
Lacrosse	Brian Griffin
Netball	Gaye Walsh
Powerlifting	Sue Roberts
Rifle shooting	Libby Felton
Rowing	Rob Scott
Soccer	Samantha Kerr
Squash	Dean Williams, Barbara Wall
Swimming	David Dickson, John Ryan, Lynne Watson, Lyn McClements, Neil Brooks, Peter Evans, Thomas Stachewicz, Ian Brown, Shelley Taylor-Smith
Tennis	Margaret Court, Elizabeth Smylie
Yachting	Syd Lodge, Rob O'Sullivan, Graham Lillingston, Peter Gilmour

== See also ==
- Western Australian Hall of Champions
