= Marian Bell =

Marian Bell may refer to:

- Marian Bell (economist) (born 1957), British economist
- Marian Bell (field hockey) (born 1958), former Australian field hockey player
