= Western Australia Police Force =

Australian state police and law enforcement agency

- Badge of the Western Australia Police

- Flag of the Western Australia Police

Agency overview
- Formed: 1 January 1834
- Employees: 9,481 (30 June 2023)
- Annual budget: A$1.48 billion (2020–21)

Jurisdictional structure
- Operations jurisdiction: Western Australia, Australia
- Western Australia Police jurisdiction
- Area: 2,527,013 km^{2} (975,685 sq mi)
- Population: 2,660,026
- Legal jurisdiction: As per operations jurisdiction
- Governing body: Government of Western Australia
- Constituting instrument: Police Act 1892 (WA)
- General nature: Civilian police

Operational structure
- Headquarters: 2 Adelaide Terrace, East Perth, Western Australia; 31.9613°S 115.8787°E
- Minister responsible: Reece Whitby MLA, Minister for Police
- Agency executive: Col Blanch, Commissioner
- Units: Crime Stoppers; Police Air Wing; Tactical Response Group; Regional Operations Group; Radio Electronic Services Unit

Facilities
- Stations: 159
- Patrol cars: >1,000

Website
- www.police.wa.gov.au

The Western Australia Police Force, colloquially WAPOL, provides state police services throughout the state of Western Australia to a population of 2.66 million people, of which 2.11 million reside in the Perth Metropolitan Region. Western Australia has a land area of 2,527,013 square kilometres (975,685 sq mi), making it the world's largest non-federated area of jurisdiction.

== History ==
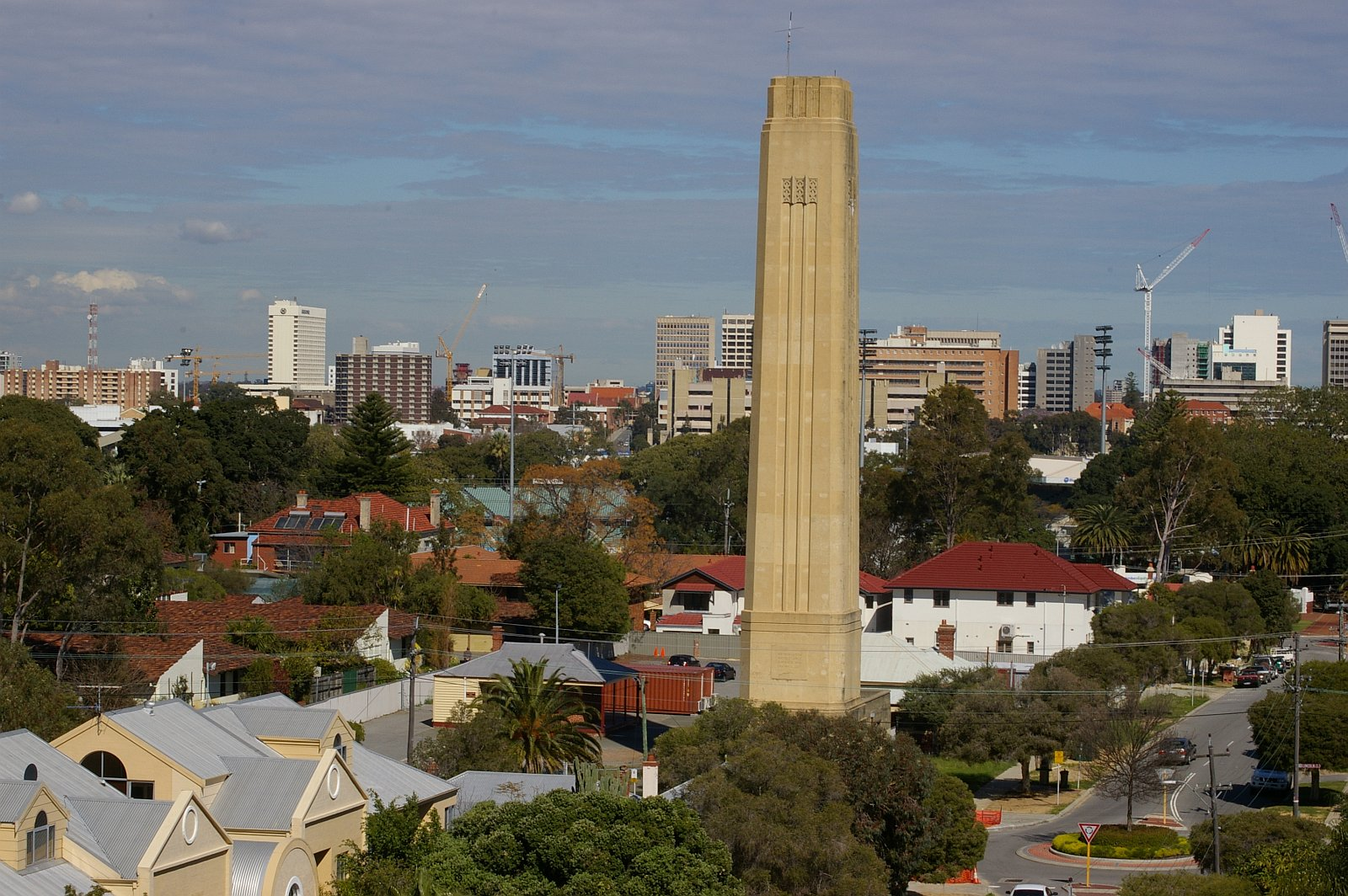
The Lincoln Street Vent, used as a police radio tower in Highgate from 1941 to 1975

=== Early history ===
The genesis of the police was the appointment of a Sheriff by Captain Stirling on 18 June 1829, as part of the proclamation of the Swan River Colony, charged with maintaining public order in Perth and Fremantle colonies. The proclamation provided for the appointment of a sheriff having under his direction a high constable, constables, bailiffs, and surveyors of highways. The Sheriff still exists as an officer of the Supreme Court of Western Australia (Department of Justice), but no longer has jurisdiction over police or highways. The Sheriff retains responsibility for enforcement of civil court judgments and the administration of jury service. Police do occasionally carry out Sheriff and Bailiff duties, particularly in remote country locations.

Early colonial policemen were recruited by Magistrates and worked part-time, employed on a local, "as needed" basis. They were paid only for specific tasks, such as one shilling for serving a summons. By 1830, there were fifteen part-time constables in the state, of whom five worked in Perth.

A Mounted Police troop was established in 1834 as the needs of the colony changed, in particular after the introduction of convicts. This troop proved unpopular with citizens due to the perception that it was not efficient and was being paid out of their taxes for duties which the military should be performing. In the same year as its establishment, the Mounted Police were involved in the Pinjarra Massacre during which a large number of Aboriginal people where killed and after which Captain Ellis, the police superintendent, died.

In 1840, the first full-time constable for Perth was appointed.

On 11 May 1849, the colony's Legislative Council passed a Police Ordinance which outlined police powers and responsibilities. The Ordinance noted that 'distinct general and town police forces' did not yet exist.

Between 1849 and 1853, the police service in Western Australia existed in one form or another, whether based on the larger townships or created for special purposes, such as the Water Police and Convict Police. By, the mid-1850s, many colonists were petitioning the Colonial Secretary for a united force.

=== Convict period ===
After convicts started arriving in the colony in 1849, the police acquired the duties of registering and supervising ticket-of-leave men. By 1870, after transportation had ceased, some 1,244 ticket-of-leave men had to be supervised by 146 police employees.

Applicants for police service were required to be aged under forty, literate and physically fit. Leave was difficult to obtain for officers and officers were not to appear in public when out of uniform. Until the end of the nineteenth century, the monthly pay day was marked by a parade with band.

A Criminal Investigation Department was set up in 1873, although two detectives had been sent out from Britain in 1854. A fingerprint bureau was set up in 1902.

=== Modern policing ===
On 5 March 1853, the Western Australian Colonial Secretary, W.A. Stanford, signed a notice published in the Government Gazette, formally establishing the Police Force as a "united, structured body". The Colonial Secretary appointed John Augustus Conroy as Superintendent of Police (sometimes referred to within the colony as Chief of Police): "His Excellency the Governor directs the following appointments to be notified for general information: T.A.Conroy (actually J.A.) to be Superintendent of Police". On 15 March 1853, the Gazette published a Code of Rules for the Western Australian Police Force, signed by the Colonial Secretary on 11 March, which outlined a formal command structure and listed basic duties of commissioned and non-commissioned officers and constables.

The new Police Force officially began operation on 14 March 1853, when Conroy formally entered his duties, taking charge of police districts and making arrangements with Magistrates for the use of the police.

By 1861, the Police Force consisted of around 75 commissioned officers. In the same year, a second, expanded Police Ordinance was passed to clarify the chain of command, the powers and responsibilities of members, and the various offences they had to deal with. The Police Ordinance was superseded by the passage of the Police Act in 1892, by which time the Police Force had increased in size to approximately 225 men.

Since the police numbering system, a system wherein police officers are assigned a Police Regimental Number (PD Number), was introduced for members in 1898, approximately 1,112 had been paid for police services between 1829 and 1898.

Between 1861 and 1995, the Police Force was known as the Western Australian Police Department. It changed its name to the Western Australian Police Service in 1994. In 2017, Commissioner Karl O'Callaghan introduced a "Frontline First" policy, which included an organisation name change to the Western Australian Police Force.

Between 1898 and August 2023, over 10,000 men and women served in the Western Australian police.

=== Women in WA Police ===
Prior to 1917, women were not permitted to serve as sworn police officers in Western Australia. Discussions of female police officers were held in October 1915 but remained unfunded.

In 1917, after two years of concerted effort from women's groups in New South Wales and South Australia, and amidst concerns that male officers were "not resourced or trained to address ... the moral or physical wellbeing of the women and children of WA", Western Australia's first female police officers, Helen Blanche Dugdale (1876–1952) and Laura Ethel Chipper (1879–1978), were appointed in August 1917 to commence duties on 1 September 1917 as Women Police Constables (WPCs) under the newly established Women Police Office.

Dugdale and Chipper were employed under the Police Act with full constabulary powers, but were officially commissioned to "patrol slum neighbourhoods", "look after drunken women", and "obtain assistance for their neglected children". Early WPCs were initially segregated from the male policing divisions, being assigned to the female-only Women Police Office, and assisting male-only units as required.

In the early 1970s, the Women Police Office was disbanded and serving female constables were integrated into all aspects of policing with the same powers and duties of their male counterparts.

As of 2023, women constitute 24.4% of sworn WA Police officers, and 25.4% of all WA Police staff, including three of 12 senior officers.

== Organisation ==
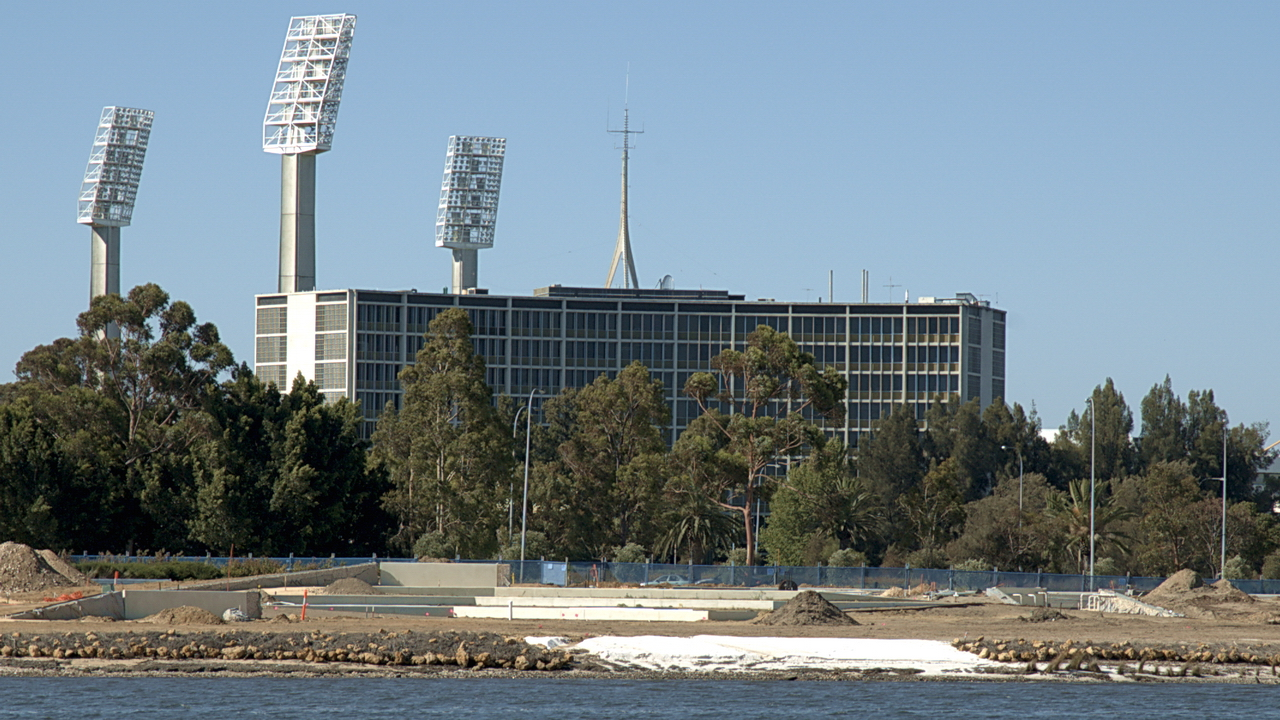
Police Headquarters (with WACA grounds floodlights in background)

The Police Headquarters is located in East Perth overlooking The Causeway, near the WACA Ground. The structure is entered on the State Heritage Register. The building fronting Hay Street opposite the WACA housed the former East Perth Lockup and a magistrate's courtroom. Recruits are trained at the Western Australian Police Academy at Joondalup. Previously, the academy was located at Maylands, in premises still used by various units including the mounted and K-9 (police dog) sections.

The command structure has the state divided into eight major policing regions, with the metropolitan policing region sub-divided into eight districts. Policing command is divided into 3 major executive divisions:

- Executive Director (responsible for technology, workforce relations, assets and governance, and finance),
- Deputy Commissioner for Operations (responsible for metropolitan and regional policing, and operational support), and
- Deputy Commissioner for Professional Standards (responsible for standards and legal, state intelligence, state crime, and specialist and support services).

These executive functions report to the Commissioner of Police, which is the highest-ranking position within the Western Australian Police Force. As of 15 July 2022, the Commissioner is Col Blanch. Politically, the service comes within the portfolio of the Minister for Police.

A number of specialist units exist within Western Australian police, including:

- Tactical Response Group (TRG)
- Canine Section (K9)
- Mounted Section
- Road Policing Group (RPG)
- Police Air Wing
- Major Crime Squad (MCS)
- Sex Crime Squad
- Child Abuse Squad
- Child Exploitation Operations
- Regional Operations Group (ROG)
- Serious and Organised Crime Squad
- Emergency Management and Specialist Support Unit (EMSSU)
- Water Police
- Traffic Motorcycle Group
- Rapid Apprehension Squad (RAS)
- Breath and Drug Operations
- Homicide Squad
- Liquor Enforcement Unit, and
- Gold Stealing Detection Unit

=== Personnel ===
As of 2023, some 9,481 police staff were employed by Western Australian police, which includes 7,214 police officers, auxiliary officers, and Aboriginal liaison officers. Police staffing includes public servants, wages staff, and full-time employees, but not children's crossing guards.

2023 staff figures saw a reduction in total staff employed by Western Australian police compared to the previous years' workforce profile. This came after several years of Western Australian police officers "quitting in record numbers", attributed to "poor pay and conditions, rigid leadership, [and] a lack of opportunity to share opinions and to progress careers". In early 2022, it was revealed that Western Australian police was struggling to attract new recruits and keep existing numbers amidst low morale issues within the organisation, prompting resignations of 40 police officers per month between January and June 2022.

=== Police Auxiliary Officers ===
As of 2023, Western Australian police employed 366 Police Auxiliary Officers, who are non-sworn officers employed to support police officers through auxiliary functions. Duties include admission, supervision, and release of detainees at Perth Watch House and other station-based lock-ups, custodial support for drugs, firearms, and other evidence, processing and management of property and other articles seized by Western Australian police, transportation of detainees to-and-from courthouses and hospitals, and a range of other station-based support tasks.

Police Auxiliary Officers are distinguishable from sworn Police Officers by their maroon epaulettes, white name patches, and uniforms, which display 'Auxiliary Officer' instead of 'Police'.

Police Auxiliary Officers who are tasked with protective service duties are authorised to carry a firearm and Taser and are equipped with telescopic batons, handcuffs, and Oleoresin Capsicum (OC) Spray. They have limited police powers and training lasts 12 weeks at the Western Australian Police Academy.

=== Regional Operations Group ===
Created in 2004, the Regional Operations Group (ROG) provides WAPOL with a specialist public order capability. Their main role is to attend and control violent situations, riots, to assist police officers requesting backup when none is available locally, or as an immediate response to serious emergencies, such as armed offenders (firearms) incidents, domestic violence, and related offences. While ROG operates primarily in the Perth Metropolitan policing districts, officers are occasionally deployed to regional policing districts to attend serious incidents.

The unit is split into three sub-units, North, Central, and South. North Metropolitan Operations Group provides specialist capability north of the Swan River, covering the Joondalup, Midland and Mirrabooka policing divisions. Central Metropolitan Operations Group supports the Central (Perth) policing division, bounded by Karrinyup, Guildford, Perth and Mosman Park. South Metropolitan Operations Group supports areas south of the Swan River, covering the Fremantle, Cannington, Armadale and Mandurah policing divisions.

Regional Operations Group officers undergo intensive public-order training and typically carry extra equipment whenever they are on duty. ROG officers are also issued with AR-15-style semi-automatic rifles for counter-terrorism duties.

=== Perth Police Complex ===
In 2013, the organisation opened a new inner-city facility at 2 Fitzgerald Street, Northbridge. Accommodating up to 500 police officers, the complex includes the Perth Police Station, the Central Metropolitan District Office, the Northbridge Magistrate's Court, and a new state-of-the-art Multi-Functional Police Facility named Perth Watch House. Before long, the police union complained that insufficient staff had been assigned to the new lock-up in the context of state government budget constraints.

=== Commissioner of Police ===
Traditionally, the Commissioner came from within the service, though in 1994 and 1999, police commissioners were head-hunted from outside Western Australian police ranks. In 1994, Victorian Bob Falconer APM was recruited from the Victoria Police Force where he had served as Deputy Commissioner. Falconer was effective in implementing the Delta Program, designed to achieve organisational and cultural change. Falconer later argued that internal measures were inadequate and that a standing crime and corruption commission was necessary to combat police corruption.

In 1999, Barry Matthews, then a Deputy Commissioner of the New Zealand Police, was appointed and served until 2004. Matthews was, however, succeeded in June 2004 by Karl O'Callaghan APM, PhD who had been employed in the Western Australian service since age 17 and was one of the service's first officers to achieve a PhD. O'Callaghan retired on 14 August 2017 and was succeeded by Chris Dawson. Chris Dawson stepped down as police commissioner in July 2022 to become Governor of Western Australia. He was replaced by Col Blanch on 15 July 2022.

=== Ranks ===
| Constable | First-Class Constable | Senior Constable | Sergeant | Senior Sergeant | Inspector | Superintendent | Commander | Assistant Commissioner | Deputy Commissioner | Commissioner |
| No Chevron | One chevron | Two chevrons | Three chevrons | Three Chevrons with a crown | Three stars, silvered metal | One star surmounted by a crown | Three small stars surmounted by a crown | Crossed batons in a laurel wreath. | Crossed batons in a laurel wreath surmounted by a star. | Crossed batons in a laurel wreath surmounted by a crown. |

== Equipment and weaponry ==
All officers are armed when on duty. The standard firearm is the Glock 22 .40-calibre pistol. Officers also carry the X-26 Taser Electronic Control Device (ECD), often described as a less-lethal force option. Prior to the Glock transition officers were armed with a .38 Special Smith & Wesson Model 10 as well as some units using the .40 S&W Smith & Wesson Sigma.

Because of the weight of equipment carried on officers' belts, uniformed officers are issued with load-bearing equipment vests fitted with pockets to safely contain equipment including ammunition magazines for their service pistol, pepper spray, telescopic baton, handcuffs, Motorola APX8000 P25 radio, and police-issue mobile phone. The vests were traditionally navy blue in colour, however variants exist within the organisation, including a fluorescent yellow version, which is worn for some operations. All officers, Police Auxiliary Officers, and officers handling property, evidence, and detainees are required to use Axon bodyworn cameras while on duty.

In 2022, Western Australian police began the rollout of a new uniform standard. The standard uniform for General Duties police officers consists of black tactical boots, blue pants, a blue service shirt with the Western Australian police logo and epaulets bearing the officers' rank embroidered on both shoulders, a load-bearing equipment vest, and a branded hat. The refreshed uniform also includes a bulletproof, stab resistant vest which consists of a black lower section with MOLLE webbing system and an upper, yellow high-visibility section which bears a number of stitched patches, including the officer's rank, their name and Police Regimental (PD) number, and the word Police.

Further specialised equipment utilised by the Tactical Response Group is detailed in § Tactical Response Group.

=== Technological capability ===
The Western Australian police leverage technology for dispatching, information and incident management, communications, investigations, and enforcement.

==== Apple iPhone and CarPlay ====
In 2019, Western Australian police announced the successful completion of an Apple CarPlay pilot program, which is the first time the platform has been used for operational policing anywhere in the world. The CarPlay program followed a A$8-million deal with Telstra to provide iPhone 11s to all frontline police officers and select agency staff from Western Australian police.

In March 2022, Motorola revealed details of a world-first smart mobile solution for Western Australian police, which saw delivery of the "world's first public safety mobile [app]".

==== Starlink Satellite Internet ====
In September 2023, it was also announced that Western Australian police had successfully trialled low earth orbit (LEO) satellite internet for use in remote areas without mobile reception, marking Western Australian police the first law enforcement agency in the world to make use of Starlink LEO internet. The effort is part of a A$8.5-million upgrade to Western Australian police's communication infrastructure which will see the technology deployed to 550 vehicles and 129 regional police stations.

=== Vehicles ===
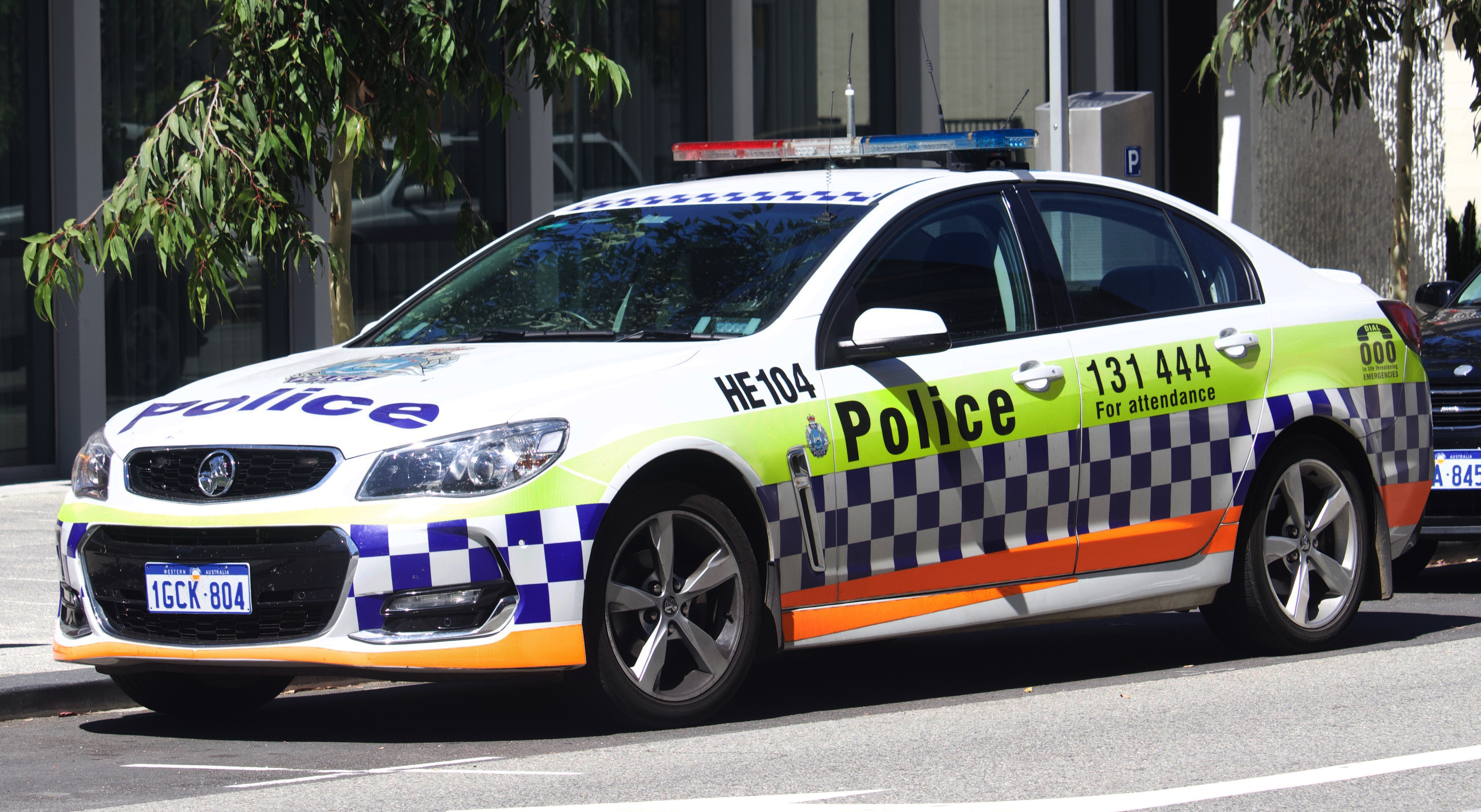
Holden VF II SV6 Commodore Sedan – General Duties

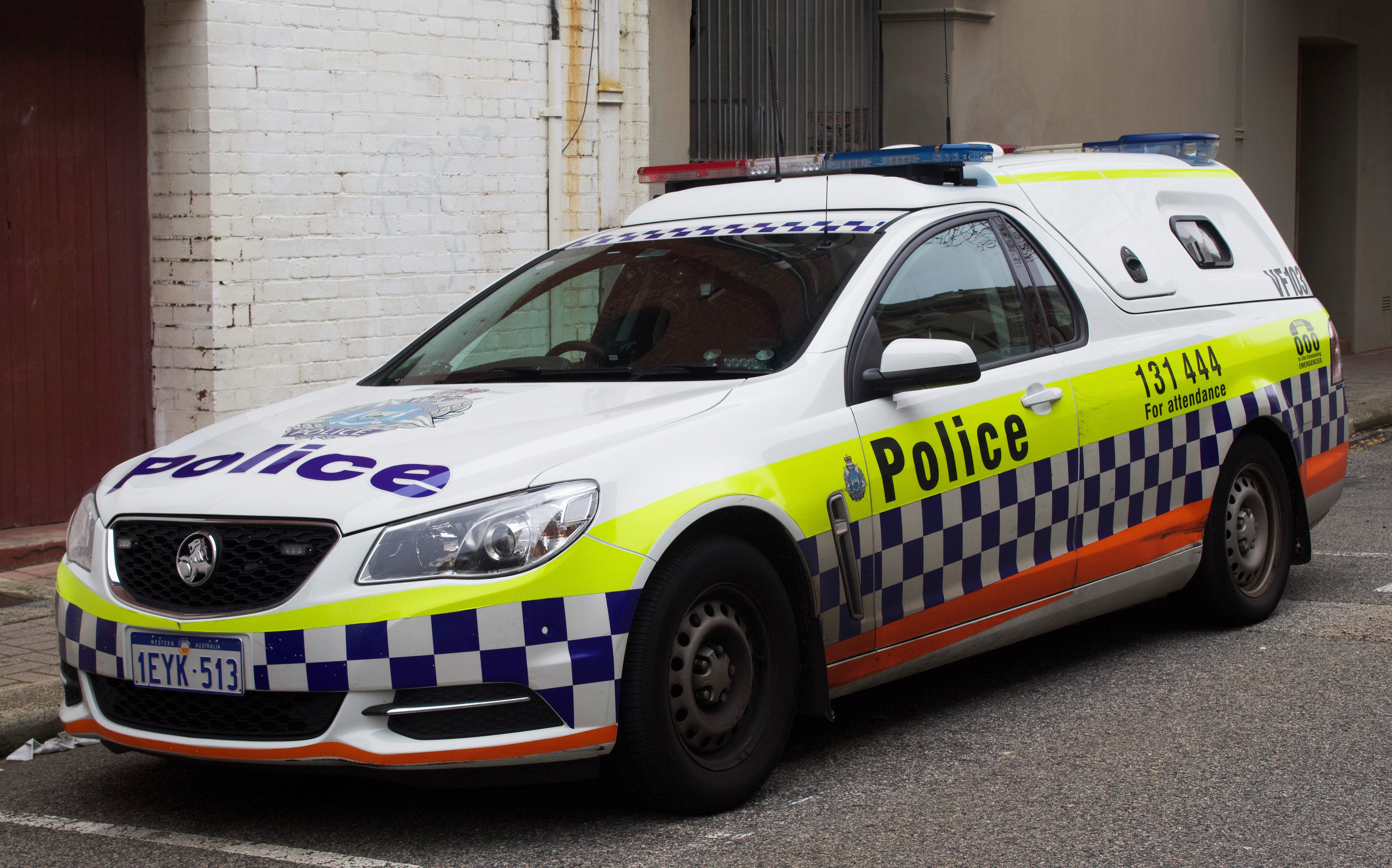
Holden VF Utility - General Duties

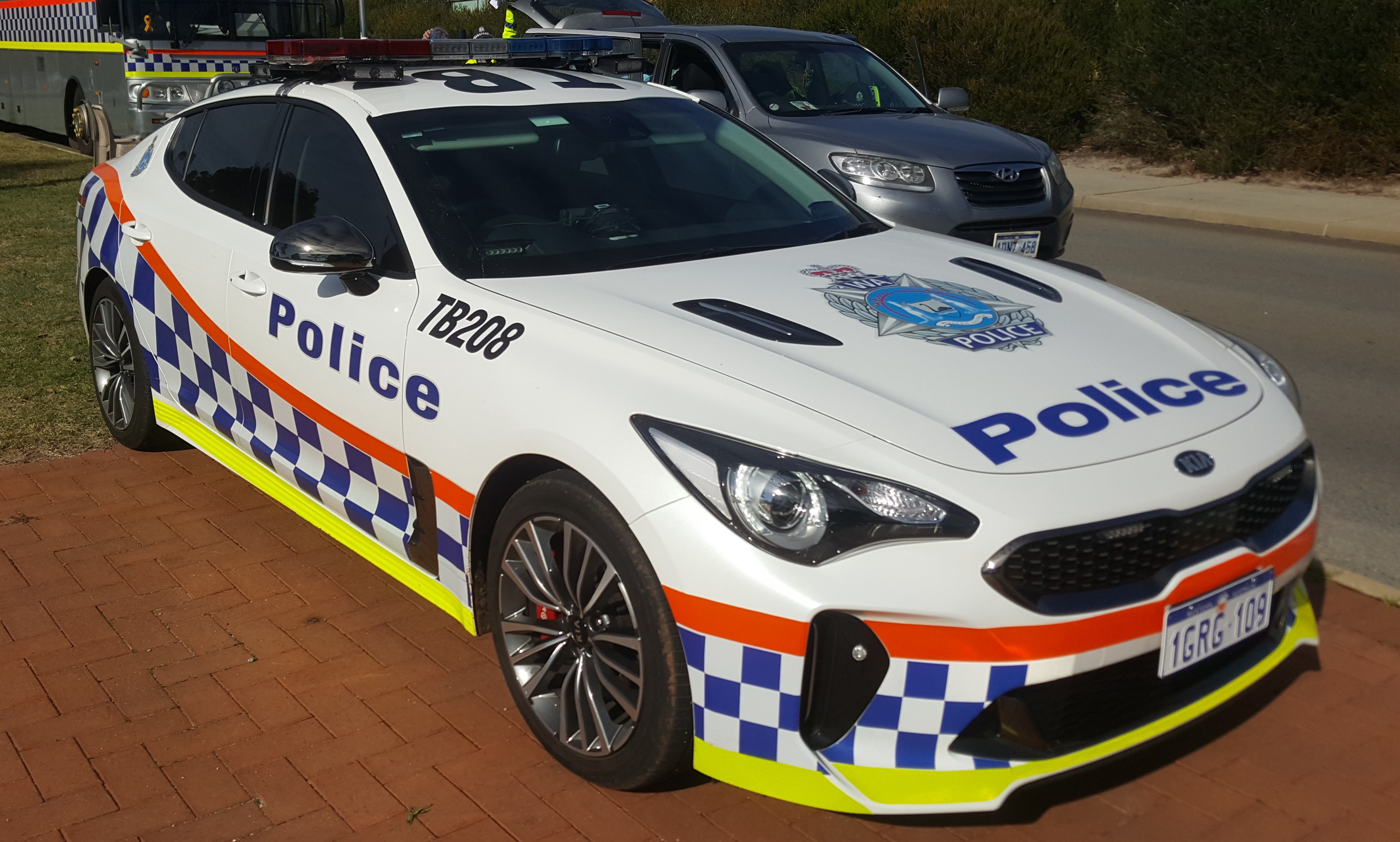
Kia Stinger Sedan - Traffic RBT Group

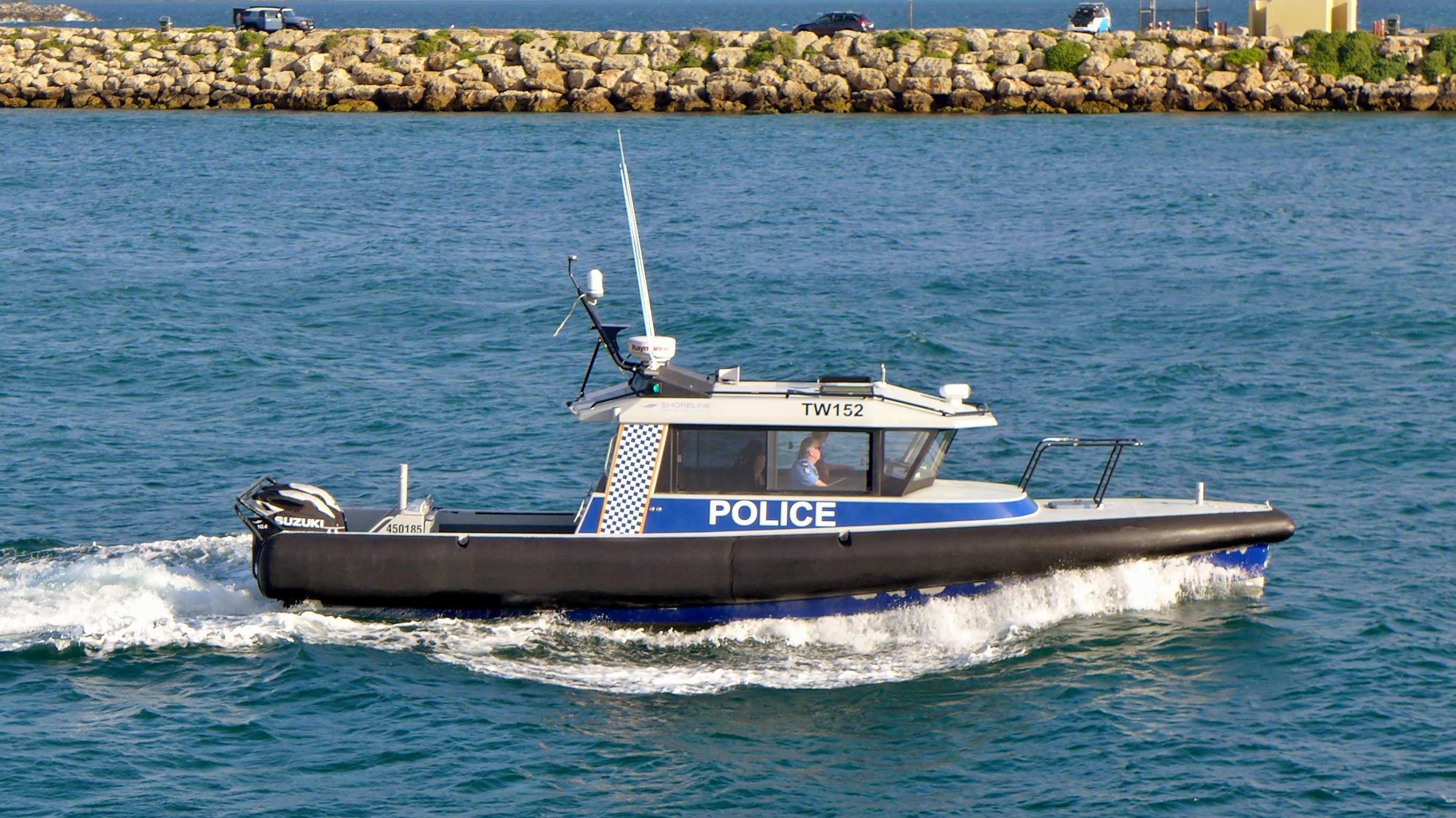
Water Police Vessel

==== Unmarked vehicles ====
A significant number of fleet vehicles of varying make and model are used by Western Australian police for unmarked (covert) policing.

==== Vehicle equipment ====
All vehicles are equipped with standard technology packages, which includes a Mobile Information Management System Terminal (IMS Terminal), a Motorola XTL2500 digital radio system, an Axon in-car digital video system, and Apple CarPlay-enabled headunit. Some specialised units' vehicles, such as Traffic Enforcement Group and Regional Operations Group are also equipped with automatic number plate recognition (ANPR) systems and automatic radar speed detection systems.

General Duties police vehicles (which form the vast majority of the fleet) carry additional equipment for general policing duties, including breath alcohol testing and drug testing facilities, firefighting equipment, defibrillators, spike strips, handheld radar speed detection gun, traffic cones and other traffic direction equipment, high-visibility raincoats, medical equipment, personal protective equipment (PPE), and other occupational-specific equipment such as ticket books, incident report pads, vehicle-affixable stickers, and evidence bags, among others.

== Specialist units ==
=== Tactical Response Group ===
Tactical Response Group (TRG) is a police tactical group, a component of the Counter Terrorism and Emergency Response Command of WA Police.

Since 1978, the Australian Government's National Anti-Terrorism Plan has required each state police force to maintain a specialised counter-terrorist and hostage-rescue unit.

TRG officers are trained for high-risk situations and provide support to police and other agencies. Such situations include dealing with armed offenders, attending sieges and civil-disorder incidents, protecting endangered witnesses, undertaking searches of premises, securing and escorting dangerous prisoners, heads of state, VIPs and internationally protected persons, as well as the state's counter-terrorist responsibility. Specialist positions include marksmen, bomb technicians and negotiators.

The TRG is equipped with a wide range of less-lethal devices as well as specialist firearms and equipment for 'domestic' and counter-terrorist operations. Training includes tactical roping, fieldcraft, water borne operations, paramedical courses, the use of chemical, biological and radiological equipment, self-contained breathing apparatus and various weapons systems. Specialised vehicles include 2 Lenco BearCat armoured police rescue vehicles and a forward-command vehicle for emergencies and other major events.

The TRG has in recent times also expanded its capability to respond to counter-terrorist and high-risk incidents in a maritime environment including specialist divers, swimmers and the ability to board ships and oil/gas platforms.

=== Police Air Wing ===
Police Air Wing was formed in 1976 and provides support to frontline police, including deployment of police personnel, crime detection and prevention, search and rescue, and medical transfers.

The Police Air Wing fleet comprises:

- Helicopters
  - one twin engine Airbus H145 D3 for special operations, transport and rescue
  - one twin-engine Kawasaki BK117 for general operations and backup capability
- Fixed-wing
  - one single-engine GippsAero GA8 Airvan
  - two single-engine Pilatus PC-12
  - one single-engine Cessna Caravan
- Remotely Piloted Aircraft System unit

The Police Air Wing has a primary base at Jandakot Airport, in addition to a PC-12 being based at Karratha Airport.

The Pilatus PC-12 is a single-engine turbo-prop aeroplane which can carry a maximum of eight passengers 1,800 kilometres (1,100 mi) – as far as Broome. It can cruise up to a height of 9,100 metres (30,000 ft) and can travel at approximately 500 kilometres per hour (310 mph). The PC-12's primary role is to transport staff statewide, but it can be utilised for search and rescue (SAR) and disaster relief efforts. The Cessna 208 is mainly used for surveillance and patrol work and can be fitted with a Leo400 FLIR unit. It is also used for inshore and land SAR searches.

The Kawasaki BK117 is a twin-engine helicopter, which has been upgraded to B2 specification. Purchased in 1990, and known as Polair 61, the aircraft's role is police patrol, surveillance, search and rescue and officer deployment. It is fitted with a Star Safire III FLIR unit with downlink capabilities, Avalex digital recorder, Avalex moving map system, four monitors, Wulfsberg tactical radio, Nitesun searchlight and a double-lift 270-kilogram (600 lb) rescue winch. FLIR (Forward looking infrared) cameras track heat sources, such as a vehicle or human body in darkness and have a high-powered zoom video camera for daylight hours.

In September 2011, the Police Air Wing took delivery of a new Eurocopter AS365 N3 helicopter, known as Polair 62. The cost of the new helicopter has been reported at A$13 million for the helicopter, plus A$9 million of equipment enhancements including Forward Looking Infra-Red cameras, winches, and live surveillance with downlink capabilities to the Police Operations Centre.

In July 2020, the police force placed an order for an Airbus H145 helicopter to replace the Kawasaki BK117. In September 2021, a second order was placed for a H145 to replace the Eurocopter Dauphin.

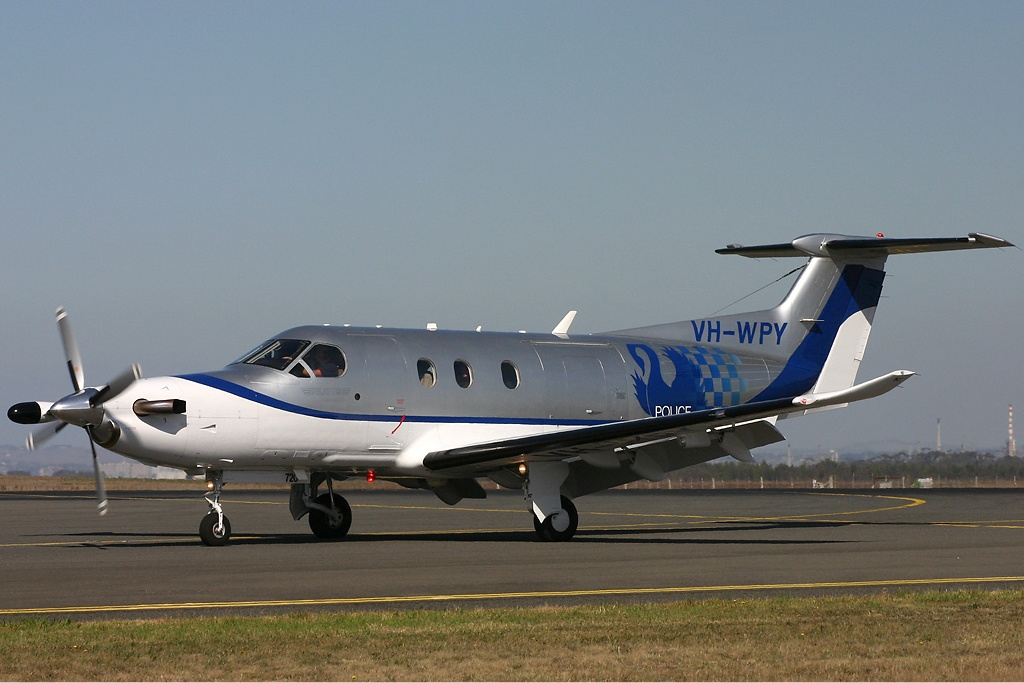
WA Police Pilatus PC-12

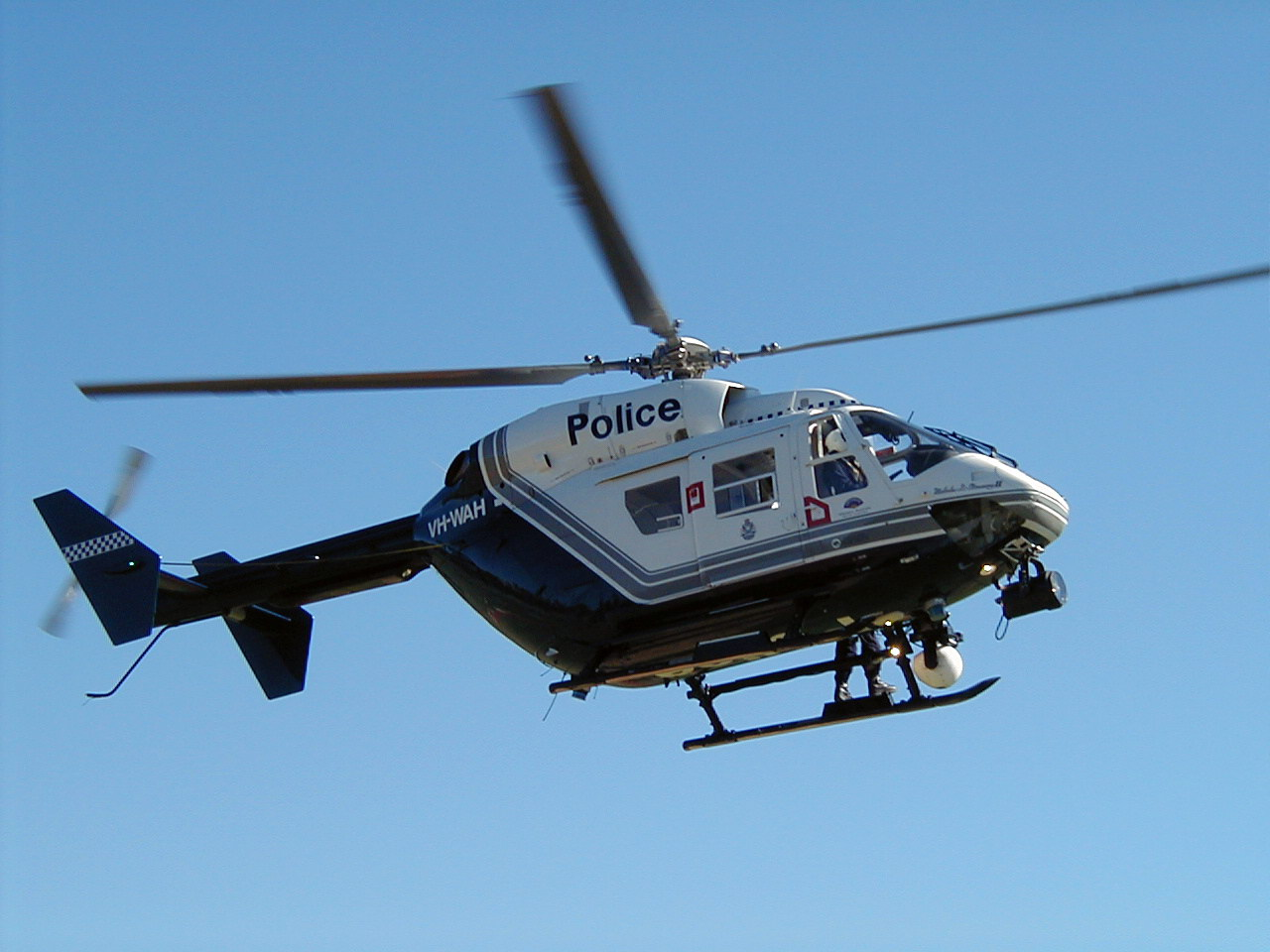
Polair 61 (VH-WAH)

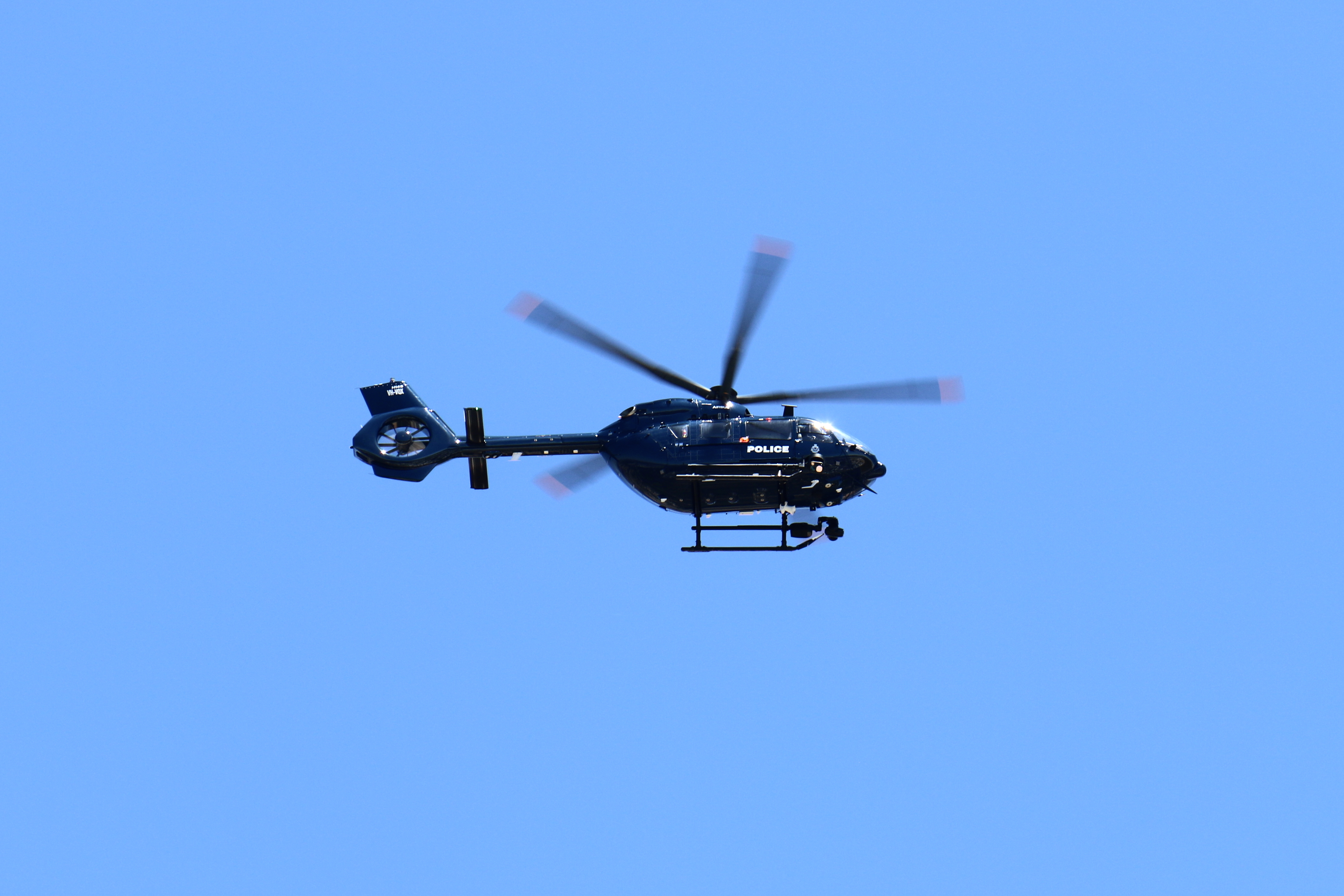
Airbus H145 (VH-VQX)

==== Helicopter crash ====
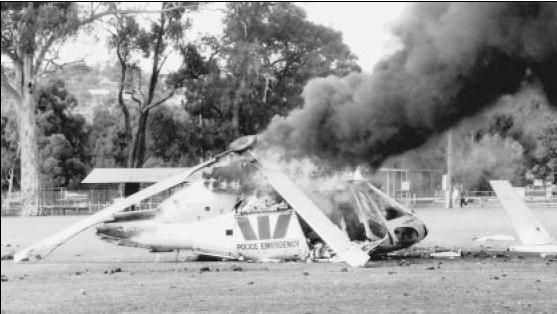
Polair One (VH-NJL)

On 8 May 1992, the police Polair One helicopter crashed while attempting to land on a sports oval for a public display in Kelmscott. The helicopter, an Aerospatiale AS355F1, was destroyed after a fire started in the engine bay following ground impact. The Bureau of Air Safety Investigation report determined "The helicopter probably entered a vortex ring state during the final approach". The pilot and crewman received minor injuries, and the two passengers serious injuries, as a result of the accident.

==== Newman plane crash ====
On 26 January 2001, four police officers died when their Cessna 310R plane crashed at night near the mining town of Newman. The plane was returning from the Kiwirrkurra Community, on the edge of the Gibson Desert, when the aircraft's engines failed due to fuel starvation on the approach to Newman airstrip. The crash was the single biggest loss of police lives in Western Australian history, and the first involving a police aircraft. The officers killed in the crash were: Senior Constable Donald Richard Everett 4600 – 49 years - Pilot of Karratha Police Airwing; Senior Constable Phillip Gavin Ruland 7877 – 32 years - Newman Police Station; First Class Constable David Adrian Dewar 9178 – 31 years - Newman Police Station; Constable Gavin Ashley Capes 10305 – 27 years - Newman Police Station. A remembrance ceremony is held each year by the people of Newman to honour this tragic event.

== Honours and awards ==
Recognition of the bravery and diligent service of Western Australia Police Force personnel is through the awarding of honours and awards. Personnel are eligible to receive awards both as a part of the Australian honours system and the internal Western Australia Police Force honours system.

=== Australian honours system ===
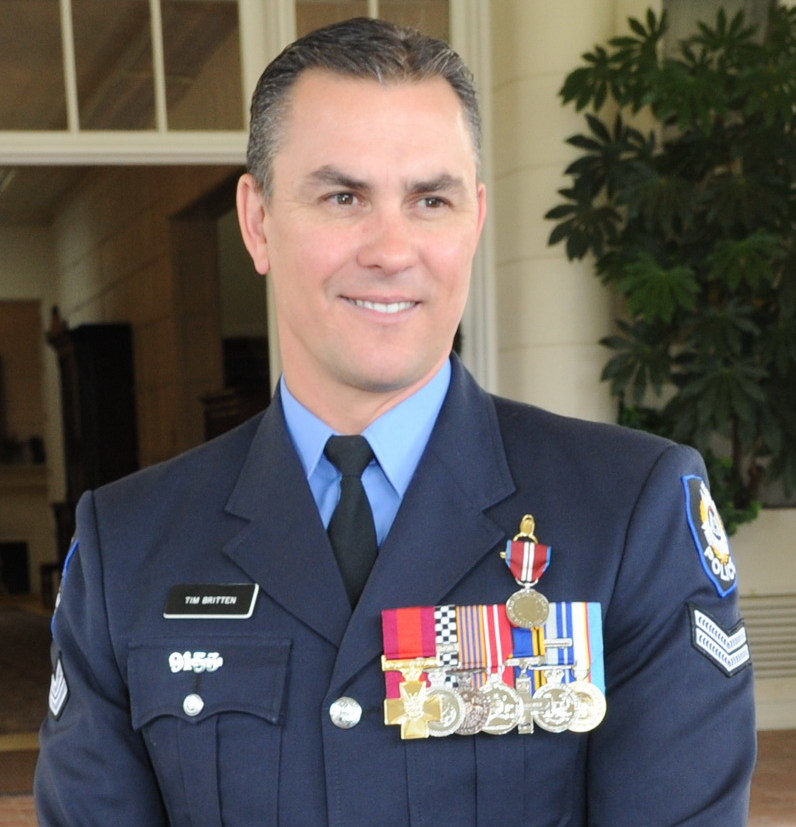
Tim Britten CV, displaying a number of Australian and Western Australia Police Force honours

Western Australia Police Force personnel are eligible for awards under the Australian honours system, including:

- Australian Bravery Awards – Cross of Valour, Star of Courage, Bravery Medal, Commendation for Brave Conduct, and Group Bravery Citation.
- Australian Police Medal – for distinguished service in the office of constable.
- Police Overseas Service Medal – for service with international peace-keeping organisations and/or service following requests for assistance from foreign governments.
- Humanitarian Overseas Service Medal – for humanitarian service overseas.
- National Emergency Medal – for sustained service during specified dates in specified places in response to nationally significant emergencies within Australia.
- National Police Service Medal – for 15 years' ethical and diligent service in the office of constable.
- National Medal – for 15 years' good conduct in operational service as members of specified organisations which serve or protect the community at hazard to themselves.

=== Western Australia Police Force honours system ===
- Cross for Bravery - Awarded to Western Australia Police Force personnel for an act of most conspicuous courage whereby the person placed themselves at peril and risk of significant personal injury or death.
- Western Australia Police Star – Awarded to Western Australia Police Force personnel who are killed or seriously injured whilst carrying out their primary functions on or off duty.
- Commissioner's Medal for Excellence - Awarded to Western Australia Police Force personnel who have consistently contributed to the achievement of the goals and objectives of the Western Australia Police.
- Western Australia Police Medal - Awarded to Western Australia Police Force personnel to recognise the sustained diligent and ethical service of its personnel.
- Special Commendation - Awarded to Western Australia Police Force personnel for an act of bravery whereby the person placed themselves at risk of personal injury, the action exceeding that might reasonably be expected.
- Commendation - Awarded to Western Australia Police Force personnel for meritorious conduct and devotion to duty under stressful conditions, whilst in the execution of his or her duty.
- Commissioner's Group Citation for Conduct - Awarded to a team/unit/district for displaying a significant level of commitment, dedication and professionalism to their duty in extenuating circumstances that reflects credit upon the Western Australia Police.
- Certificate of Outstanding Performance – Awarded for consistent outstanding performance by both individuals and teams at a District/Divisional and Regional/Portfolio level.
- Certificate of Appreciation – Awarded for significant contributions by individuals or community groups who, in partnership with Western Australia Police, have provided innovative, quality police services necessary to create a safer and more secure Western Australia.

== Aboriginal-run police station ==
The first Indigenous-run police station is at Warakurna, a 4-hour drive westwards from Uluru, set up some years ago and already showing some positive effects. Filmmaker Cornel Ozies, who made a documentary about the station called Our Law and shown at the 2020 Sydney Film Festival, puts the success of the program down to four things: "respect, understanding, communication, and education". The two Noongar police officers from Perth learnt the local Ngaanyatjarra language and cultural protocols of the Ngaanyatjarra people.

== Criticism ==
=== 1975 Murder of Shirley Finn ===
Shirley Finn was a Perth brothel keeper and nightclub operator who was shot dead in her car around midnight on 23 June 1975 in South Perth. The murder of Finn has long been rumoured to have resulted from a police conspiracy with political ramifications. The specific circumstances surrounding Finn's death, including her alleged sighting at the canteen bar of the WA Police headquarters in East Perth shortly before her murder, have never been officially disclosed, despite several purported investigations and a Royal Commission.

In 2017, following persistent public interest in the case over the years, a coroner's inquest was opened to take evidence from witnesses regarding the killing, which sat through 28 days of evidence and heard from some 70 witnesses. The inquest returned an open finding with Coroner Barry King closing with the announcement that there had been "incompetence" in the police investigation and that there were "too many suspects", while vital evidence had "disappeared", including the murder weapon and the victim's luxury car.

The Coroner's report further acknowledged that the "most compelling theory" about why she was killed related to her "[attempts] to blackmail police about corruption", with the report further providing "it is a curious feature of this analysis that the circumstances of the murder and the existence of the motive appear to be interdependent."

No suspects have ever been formally charged in the matter and, as of 2025, the crime remains unsolved.

=== Deaths in custody ===
The 1987-1991 Royal Commission into Aboriginal Deaths in Custody reported on the underlying social, cultural, and legal issues behind deaths in custody of Aboriginal and Torres Strait Islander people. Amongst 99 cases investigated by the Commission was the violent death of a 16-year-old Aboriginal boy, death of John Pat, whilst in the custody of WA Police in Roebourne, Western Australia in 1983. Commissioner Elliott Johnston expressed public criticism over the lack of any disciplinary charges against five officers implicated in the violent death of a 16-year-old Aboriginal Boy, finding the circumstances and event of Pat's death "a most unsatisfactory state of affairs".

The 2002 Kennedy Royal Commission investigated the February 1988 death of 18-year-old Stephen Wardle, who died whilst in custody in the East Perth lockup. A particularly controversial aspect of the case was that 17 police witnesses declined to give evidence at the Coronial Inquiry "for the reason that their evidence might have had the tendency to incriminate them." The Commission's report noted:

The Royal Commission has no authority under its terms of reference to go beyond the determination of whether or not there has been criminal or corrupt conduct by any police officer with respect to the death of Stephen Wardle. The evidence does not sustain any contention that there was corrupt or criminal conduct by any police officer or officers in relation to his death [...].

=== 2002 Royal Commission into WA Police integrity ===
Throughout the 1990s, there was widespread public concern about police activities and perceived shortcomings in internal integrity, resulting in development of draft terms of reference for a proposed Royal Commission by the Labor parliamentary opposition. In 2002, the Kennedy Royal Commission commenced to examine aspects of the behaviour and culture of the service. It concluded in 2004, finding that

"...the full range of corrupt or criminal conduct from stealing to assaults, perjury, drug dealing and the improper disclosure of confidential information have been examined. [The Western Australian Police Service] has been ineffective in monitoring those events and modifying its procedures to deal with that conduct and to prevent its repetition. The fact that there remain in WAPS a number of officers who participated in this conduct, and who not only refused to admit it, but also uniformly denied it with vehemence, is a matter of concern."

In 2003, largely as a result of the findings of the Royal Commission, a permanent investigative Corruption and Crime Commission was established by the Government of Western Australia.

=== History of racism ===
On 12 July 2018, in a NAIDOC Week address, Police Commissioner Chris Dawson formally acknowledged a "history of racism or 'unconscious bias'" and publicly apologised to Aboriginal people for past mistreatment, sharing "[he wants] this to be a real movement in which we are going to act and police differently than we have in the past ... [and] we want to treat Aboriginal people as all people should be treated."

In June 2020, Western Australian Attorney-General, John Quigley, made comments to SBS News ahead of a Black Lives Matter rally in Perth, marking "systematic discrimination" against Indigenous Australians in the state's justice system. Quigley closed by saying that legislative reforms were being planned.

=== Investigative abuses ===
==== 2007 Corryn Rayney murder investigation ====
Corryn Rayney was an Australian-Ugandan refugee who was found dead in Kings Park on 16 August 2007. The circumstances surroundiung Rayney's death remain mysterious with no clear cause of death being identified, though police announced early on that her death was being treated as a murder inquiry. Rayney's husband, Lloyd Rayney, a prominent barrister specialising in criminal prosecution, was charged with her murder, but was found not guilty by Justice Brian Martin.

In handing down his not guilty verdict, Justice Martin was critical of some police actions, stating that "there were instances of unacceptable conduct by some investigators ranging from inappropriate to reprehensible". He added that he had found "no evidence that lines of inquiry were not properly investigated". Some five years before charges were laid, the Senior Sergeant in charge of the investigation had publicly named Lloyd Rayney as the force's "only suspect" and the "primary person of interest". At the trial, which extended over three months, the Judge found that "the State case is bereft of any evidence [establishing] a crime scene". He concluded "The case for the State is beset by improbabilities and uncertainties. Crucial evidence is lacking and the absence of evidence tells strongly against the State. Endeavours by the State to fill critical gaps and explain away improbabilities are primarily no more than speculation without foundation in the evidence." These findings were substantially upheld and vindicated by an appeal bench of three judges who unanimously dismissed the prosecutors' appeal, and upheld the trial judge's analysis and verdict.

An April 2014 report of the Western Australian Corruption and Crime Commission (CCC) cleared two police officers of any serious misconduct in the Rayney murder investigation. Their behaviour in threatening a female lawyer had been described as ranging from "inappropriate to reprehensible" by the trial judge. A second matter reviewed by the CCC related to "attempts by a third officer to encourage an independent pathologist involved in the case to change a report to better fit police evidence. That officer was found to have acted unreasonably." In September 2014, lawyer and former State Governor, Malcolm McCusker, supported calls for an independent review, and also a CCC investigation of "claims that police manufactured evidence to incriminate ... Lloyd Rayney".

As of 2017, the senior investigating officer in the Rayney murder case continued to regard Lloyd Rayney as "the prime and only suspect", despite Lloyd Rayney's comprehensive exoneration by the courts. A defamation action brought by Lloyd Rayney resulted in a record compensation award of over $2.6 million and legal costs of over $10 million.

On 21 April 2020, Lloyd Rayney was struck off by Legal Practice Board. Later the same year, Lloyd Rayney sued one of the lead forensic investigators on the case for allegedly making defamatory comments at a seminar at Curtin University in 2014. Lloyd Rayney was awarded A$438,000 in damages.

=== Wrongful prosecutions ===
Justice Martin's criticism of the Corryn Rayney investigation followed the exposure of a number of notorious cases of wrongful prosecution by Western Australia Police, including those of John Button, Darryl Beamish, the Mickelberg brothers and Andrew Mallard, resulting in reversal of long-standing convictions and large compensation payouts by the Western Australian Government. In the case of Mallard, who spent 12 years in prison after an unjust conviction, a former WA Police Assistant Commissioner concluded "Mallard is a very clear example of how police and prosecutorial misconduct can lead to a wrongful conviction and a miscarriage of justice ... It is also another clear example of the difficulties in holding people to account."

==== Scott Austic ====
A clemency petition drafted by the eminent barrister Malcolm McCusker, and lodged with the Western Australian Attorney-General in 2012, alleged that "key evidence was planted, withheld and misrepresented" in police investigations leading to a 2009 murder trial in which Scott Douglas Austic was found guilty and sentenced to a minimum 25-year jail term. After two successive Attorneys-General declined to act on the petition, a fresh petition for clemency was lodged in March 2018 with Attorney-General John Quigley, who also proposed legislation to allow people convicted of crimes to apply directly to the Court of Appeal. Quigley, formerly an honorary life member of the Police Union of Western Australia, subsequently became a fierce critic of the WA Police culture and hierarchy.

After spending over a decade in jail, in May 2020, Austic won an appeal against his conviction, and was acquitted at a retrial in November 2020. and is seeking compensation from the State of Western Australia. Reports by the state's Corruption and Crime Commission in 2013 and 2023 "formed no opinion of misconduct among police or prosecutors" involved in the investigation or prosecution of Austic, and said "limitations in evidence collected by police meant it was not possible to determine issues around evidence being planted."

Austic asked the Western Australian Government for A$8.5 million in compensation but, in May 2023, was given an ex-gratia payment of A$1.6 million, following "comprehensive legal advice".

==== Aboriginal man, Gene Gibson ====
On 12 April 2017, Gene Gibson, an illiterate and mentally impaired 25-year-old Aboriginal man, was released from prison by an appeals court after unjustly serving five years of a manslaughter sentence. Gibson, who was 20 when charged with a two-year-old unsolved murder, was interviewed for many hours by two junior detectives without benefit of an interpreter or legal counsel, which ultimately led to a fake confession and wrongful conviction. Police Commissioner Karl O'Callaghan apologised for the investigative failure, but disclosed the three officers "had not accepted blame and would now face an internal disciplinary process".

=== Taser misuse incidents ===
==== Robert Cunningham and Catherin Atoms ====
In November 2008, Robert Cunningham, an Associate Law Professor, and his wife Catherine Atoms, were tasered by WA Police officers during an arrest following an incident outside the Esplanade Hotel in Fremantle. Cunningham and Atoms were both taken into custody and charged with Obstructing a Public Officer. In 2010, charges against both Cunningham and Atoms were dismissed after a Magistrate described evidence given by one of the arresting police officers as "extremely evasive", "imprecise" and "unconvincing".

Between 2008 and 2015, Cunningham repeatedly requested that the matter be investigated to no success. In 2016, the couple launched civil proceedings against the State of Western Australia and the three WA Police officers involved. In December 2016, a District Court Judge, Felicity Davis, awarded over A$$1 million in damages over the incident.

==== Taser "initiation rituals" ====
In December 2010, two senior WA Police officers, a 53-year-old Sergeant and 45-year-old Senior Constable, were dismissed for lying to investigators during an internal inquiry into the misuse of tasers at Rockingham Police Station. Police Internal Affairs investigators found that, between October 2008 and May 2010, on a number of occasions, the Sergeant and Senior Constable misused tasers against other members of staff, including females, during bizarre initiation and farewell ceremonies to the station.

Police Commissioner Karl O'Callaghan noted that the primary reason for the officers' dismissal was that the Sergeant and Senior Constable had repeatedly lied to investigators during the inquiry, stating "the final straw in this whole sorry saga was that neither of the two officers investigated told the truth to internal investigators when they were first required to ... they continued to deny the allegations and offered improbable explanations for their behaviour", and that one of the officers had to be interviewed six times in order to get a full and proper account of the incident.

It was further found that the officers had helped to form an "unacceptable culture" at the station, where "junior staff felt unable to bring matters of concern to the attention of more senior police".

==== Repeated tasering of Aboriginal man on two occasions ====
On 31 August 2008, Kevin Spratt, a 39-year-old Aboriginal man, was tasered twice whilst in custody at the East Perth Watchhouse, later being charged with refusing a strip search. CCTV footage released two years later, in September 2010, showed Spratt was subdued, sitting on a bench when the taser was first deployed. In April 2012, the CCC made several misconduct findings, recommended charges, and said police used "undue and excessive" force. In April 2013, it was reported that two senior officers were to be tried on criminal charges over the incident, though in a January 2014 hearing, the two officers were fined and given suspended jail terms for unlawful assault.

On 6 September 2008, Spratt suffered a dislocated shoulder, fractured ribs, and a collapsed lung in prison following a "cell extraction" wherein he was tasered eleven times by Emergency Support Group officers from the Department of Corrective Services. The CCC later found that seven out of the 11 taser deployments were "reasonable", while no findings were made to the other four due to insufficient evidence. Spratt later pleaded guilty to the charge of Obstructing Police and was jailed for two months.

Between 2010 and 2019, Spratt was taken into custody a number of times by police after a number of assaults on police and other incidents.

On 24 December 2019, Spratt was again taken into custody after allegedly spitting at, bitting, and throwing his own faeces at two police officers as they tried to stop him from running away from Peel Health Campus where he allegedly assaulted a hospital worker. Two days later, while in custody Spratt was transported to Royal Perth Hospital to see a doctor, where it was reported "when staff tried to x-ray him... they too were allegedly attacked". The December 2019 incidents came after a series of disturbing clashes with police, which the WA Police Union expressed concern in regards to Spratt's aggressive behaviour, noting that "Spratt's aggressive behaviour has escalated to the point that numerous police officers and medical staff have allegedly been assaulted by him in separate incidents".

In 2019, at the age of 50, Spratt took his own life.

==== Person seated in vehicle ====
In March 2018, Grantley James Keenan, a Senior Constable was suspended for tasering a man seated at the wheel of his vehicle in Fremantle. The tasering had been deemed lawful by a police internal investigation, but was later described as unlawful, unreasonable and oppressive in a report by the CCC. In 2019, Keenan was found guilty of two counts of Common Assault against the motorist and received an eight month suspended prison sentence. Keenan was also ordered to pay a fine of A$1,500 and court costs of almost A$16,500.

=== Charges brought against serving police officers ===
==== "Clothes-line" attack on motorbike riders ====
On 27 November 2010, an off-duty Senior Constable in WA Police's Specialist Enforcement and Operations Team, Matthew Gerard Owen Pow, was charged with two counts of committing an act causing danger or bodily harm and two counts of assault causing bodily harm, after allegedly tying a rope across a Karawara path, known to be used by motorbike riders at night. Two boys, aged 15 and 16, sustained superficial injuries after falling off their motorcycles, later claiming Pow tied the rope across the path.

Pow appeared before Perth Magistrates Court on 4 January 2011. Pow's defence argued that insufficient evidence existed for his conviction as the rope alleged to have been used was never located. On 8 March 2012, a jury acquitted Pow, finding him not guilty.

==== Police officer twice convicted of assault ====
In February 2019, ABC news reported that WA Police Senior Constable, Nathan Robert Trenberth, was filmed repeatedly punching a 20-year-old man in the head during the Sky Show celebrations. The presiding Magistrate described his use of force as "unreasonable" and convicted the officer of assault and fined him A$1,500. Trenberth had a second conviction for assault in relation to an arrest of a man at a 2006 Australia Day fireworks display.

== See also ==
- Constable Care
- Western Australia Police Pipe Band
- Crime in Western Australia
- Police misconduct

== General references ==
- Western Australia Police Force Annual Reports (Series from 2001)
- Western Australian Year Book 1974.
- Lieutenant-Governor Stirling's Proclamation of the Colony, 18 June 1829 (UK)
- Western Australia Police Service 2003
- WA Parliamentary Select Committee on the Western Australian Police Service Interim Report, June 1996
- Episodes in Western Australia's Policing History (1834-2002) on official website
