= Julian Pearce (field hockey) =

Australian field hockey player

Medal record

Men's field hockey

Representing Australia

Olympic Games
Silver medal – second place	1968 Mexico City	Team competition
Bronze medal – third place	1964 Tokyo	Team competition

Julian Brian Pearce (born 7 March 1937 in Jabalpur, India) is an Indian-born Australian former field hockey player who represented Australia in 45 international matches including three Olympic Games. Julian was the youngest of five international-level hockey playing brothers, the others being Cec, Mel, Eric and Gordon.

Following the partition of India, his father Cec and elder brothers Cec and Mel settled in Perth, Western Australia in 1947. His mother Gladys arrived in 1948 with Julian and the two other brothers. The Anglo-Indian family had intended on settling in Victoria but instead chose to stay in Western Australia.

Tall and solidly built, Julian was highly regarded as a defender, being the odd man out as all four of his brothers were better known as forwards. In 1958 he captained the state Colts team and in the same year joined his brothers in the state senior side in which the team enjoyed a win in the national final against New South Wales. This was the only time the five brothers competed alongside each other. Julian represented Western Australia also in 1959, 1960, 1964, 1965 and 1968.

He joined Eric and Gordon in the Australian team at the 1960 Summer Olympics in Rome and in 1962 went to India in the Ten-Nation Championship—the forerunner to today's Hockey World Cup. In 1964 he went to Tokyo Olympics with Eric where Australia managed a bronze medal and in 1968 at Mexico City won silver with Eric and Gordon.

Pearce retired from international hockey in 1970 but continued in the Western Australian grade competition, playing with and coaching Trinity until the mid-1980s.

He was inducted into the Western Australian Hall of Champions in 1987 and the Sport Australia Hall of Fame in 1999.
