= Wendy Pritchard =

Australian field hockey player

Wendy Pritchard (née Butcher) is a former Western Australian field hockey player. She was born in Busselton, Western Australia on 15 May 1949 and represented Australia for 11 years in a distinguished career as a player and manager.

In her youth, she moved to Perth to study, and was selected for the state team at the age of 16: the youngest ever. Pritchard would play for her state for 13 years. Soon after she was selected for the Australian team of which she was a regular member from 1965 to 1973. International matches included participation in the World Championships in 1967 in Germany and in 1971 in New Zealand. She was principally a half-back but also played as an inside-forward. She had explosive stamina and excelled in high pressure matches.

After retiring from her playing career, she was manager for the Australian Women's Hockey team from 1993 to 2000 when Australian won Olympic gold in 1996 and 2000.

Pritchard was inducted into the Western Australian Hall of Champions in 2002, and the Hockey Australia Hall of Fame in 2008.
