= Kennedy Royal Commission =

Australian 2002 inquiry

The Royal Commission Into Whether There Has Been Corrupt or Criminal Conduct By Any Western Australian Police Officer, commonly known as the Kennedy Royal Commission, was a Royal Commission established in 2002 by the state government of Western Australia to determine whether any officer of the Western Australia Police had engaged in corrupt or criminal conduct. The commission issued an interim report on 20 December 2002 and a final report on 30 January 2004.

The commissioner was Hon. G. A. Kennedy QC. Establishment of the commission arose from widespread public concern over the behaviour and integrity of the Western Australia Police. The terms of reference required inquiry into factual matters and the effectiveness of police procedures.

The final report of the commission concluded that:

... the full range of corrupt or criminal conduct from stealing to assaults, perjury, drug dealing and the improper disclosure of confidential information have been examined. [the Western Australian Police force] has been ineffective in monitoring those events and modifying its procedures to deal with that conduct and to prevent its repetition. ... The fact that there remain in WAPS a number of officers who participated in this conduct, and who not only refused to admit it, but also uniformly denied it with vehemence, is a matter of concern.

A principal recommendation was that a Crime and Corruption Commission be established as an oversight body in a system where "the Commissioner of Police should retain the primary responsibility for managing the discipline of the Police Service".
