= Terry Buddin =

Retired Judge of NSW Supreme Court

Terry Buddin SC is presently Inspector of the Law Enforcement Conduct Commission in the state of New South Wales, Australia. From 1995 to 1997, he was Director of Public Prosecutions of the Australian Capital Territory. On 30 January 2002, he was sworn in as a judge of the Supreme Court of New South Wales. He retired from the Court on 16 March 2012. Since 2012 he is a professor at the University of Wollongong School of Law, where he has the title Judge-in-Residence. In 2013, he was appointed an acting Judge of the Supreme Court of Western Australia to hear the appeal of the acquittal of Lloyd Rayney. He is a graduate of the University of Sydney (BA 1969, LLB 1972).
