= Mavis Gray =

Australian field hockey player

Mavis Gray (born 12 February 1944; née Beckett) is a former Australian field hockey player. Gray was born in Bunbury, Western Australia and represented Australia and Western Australia in a comparatively long career.

== Early life and career ==
Gray grew up near Cowaramup and started playing hockey at the age of nine. She played in her first country week carnival in 1959. She represented her state between 1963 and 1978 with a few interruptions and was vice-captain in 1969 and captain in 1974-75 when Western Australia won the national title.

Mavis played against Japan in 1969 and went to Auckland, New Zealand as a reserve in the 1971 World Championships. In 1975 she captained Australia in Edinburgh, Scotland and also went to the Netherlands in 1976. Her international career spanned from 1969 to 1977.

Gray was inducted into the Western Australian Hall of Champions in 1990.
