= Steele Bishop =

Australian racing cyclist

Personal information
- Full name: Steele Bishop
- Born: 29 April 1953 (age 73) Kalamunda, Western Australia, Australia

Cycling career
- Sport: Cycling
- Discipline: Track
- Role: Rider
- Rider type: Pursuitist

Professional teams
- 1982: Mavic - Clemenso
- 1983–1984: Malvern Star

Major wins
- 1983 world champion in 5,000 m individual pursuit

Steele Bishop OAM (born 29 April 1953) is an Australian former track and road racing cyclist and 5,000 m individual pursuit world champion in 1983.

In 2018 he returned to competitive track cycling winning Gold in the West Australian State Masters Individual Pursuit.

His biography was published 2019.

== Biography ==
Bishop was born in 1953 in Subiaco, Western Australia.

From 1971 until his retirement in 1984 Bishop won numerous Australian professional track titles, including the 5,000 metre pursuit eight times. In Western Australia, he won the Westral Wheelrace six times between 1975 and 1984 and won the first two Griffin 1000 road races.

In 1972, at the age of 19, Bishop represented Australia in the 4000 metre team pursuit at the Munich Olympics.

In the world championships in Zurich in 1983 Bishop reached his zenith, winning the professional 5,000 m individual pursuit title. He rode in the 5,000 metre Individual pursuit on a specially built pursuit bicycle made in Switzerland by Leo Estermann in 1981. The bicycle was badged Malvern Star by sponsor General Accessories, and later rebadged Steele Bishop. The Estermann stamp on the head tube remains. A crack in the unusual stem was rectified by Avocet Cycles, owned and operated by John Sampson in Claremont Western Australia (no longer in business). The bicycle was relatively small framed for the powerfully built Bishop and featured aerodynamic tubing to reduce wind resistance. The bicycle, now part of the collection of the Western Australian Museum, is on display at the WA Museum Boola Bardip site in the Perth Cultural Centre.

Bishop faced off against Swiss Robert Dill-Bundi, the 1980 Olympic pursuit gold medallist, in the 1983 pursuit final. Riding the race of his life, he caught his opponent three laps from the finish, a feat almost unheard of in world-class cycling, thus winning the race and the championship. He set a personal best in the race of 5 minutes 51 seconds and became the first Australian to beat 6 minutes in the event. He retired shortly after while at the peak of his career.

Bishop was awarded the Western Australian Sports Star of the Year award in 1983 and was inducted into the Western Australian Hall of Champions in 1985. Also in 1985 he was awarded the Medal of the Order of Australia.

He returned to competitive track cycling in 2018 winning Gold in the West Australian State Masters Individual Pursuit and setting an unofficial world record. At the Australian Masters Track Cycling Championships in Brisbane in April 2019 he won three gold medals. At the UCI Masters Track Cycling World Championships in Manchester, UK in October 2019 he won gold medals in four men's 65-69 events; time trial, pursuit, 20 lap scratch race and the 40 lap points race. He also set a new world record in the qualifying round of the men's 65-69 2 km pursuit with a time of 2.24.646.

Bishop's autobiography, Wheels of Steele — The Makings of a World Champion, was released in 2019 by Rockpool Publishing — see Official Website link below.
