= Eric Pearce (field hockey) =

Australian field hockey player (1931–2026)

Medal record

Men's field hockey

Representing Australia

Olympic Games
Silver medal – second place	1968 Mexico City	Team
Bronze medal – third place	1964 Tokyo	Team

Eric Robert Pearce (29 October 1931 – 7 September 2026) was an Indian-born Australian international field hockey player who represented Australia at four Olympic Games and numerous other international matches. He was born in Jabalpur, India. In his home state of Western Australia, he played as a striker for 19 years.

== Playing career ==
Pearce was one of five international-level hockey playing brothers, the others being Cec, Mel, Gordon and Julian. He is considered to be one of the finest field hockey players to have represented Australia.

Following the partition of India, his father Cec and elder brothers Cec and Mel settled in Perth, Western Australia, in 1947. His mother Gladys, Eric and his two other brothers followed in the following year. The Anglo-Indian family had intended on settling in Victoria but instead chose to stay in Western Australia.

In the 1956 Olympics in Melbourne he joined Gordon and Mel in the Australian team. He also competed in the 1960 Olympics in Rome, the 1964 Olympics in Tokyo (bronze, Australia's first Olympics field hockey medal) and the 1968 Olympics in Mexico City (silver). Pearce was the Australian team flag-bearer at the 1968 Olympics. In the 1964 Olympics he scored Australia's only two goals which enabled his team to beat Pakistan (2–1) for the first time. In the 1968 Olympics he scored all eight goals in one match against Japan (8–1), his biggest tally in an international match.

He played in 12 national championships for Western Australia, winning seven, largely due to his own goal scoring abilities. He was inducted into the Sport Australia Hall of Fame as a founding member in 1985—the only hockey player to have been selected. He was inducted into the Western Australian Hall of Champions in 1986.

== Personal life and death ==
His daughter, Colleen Pearce, was part of the Australian national hockey team that came third at the 1983 World Cup and fourth at the 1984 Olympics.

Pearce died on 7 September 2026 in Perth, Western Australia at the age of 94.
