= May Campbell =

May Campbell may refer to:

- May Campbell (field hockey)
- May Campbell (rugby union)
- May Campbell (politician)
