= Western Australia Police Pipe Band =

Grade 1 pipe band in Perth, Australia

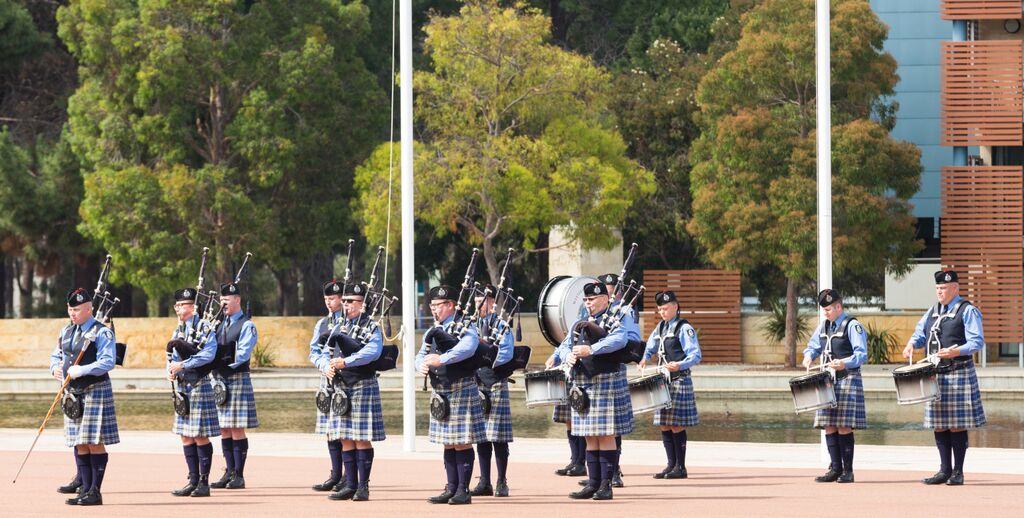
- Established: 1966
- Location: Perth
- Grade: 1
- Pipe major: Chris McDonald
- Drum major: Darren King
- Drum sergeant: Gary Potter
- Tartan: Napier
- Website: wapol.com.au

The Western Australia Police Pipe Band (WAPOL) is an Australian competitive pipe band organisation based in Perth, Western Australia associated with the Western Australia Police.

== History ==
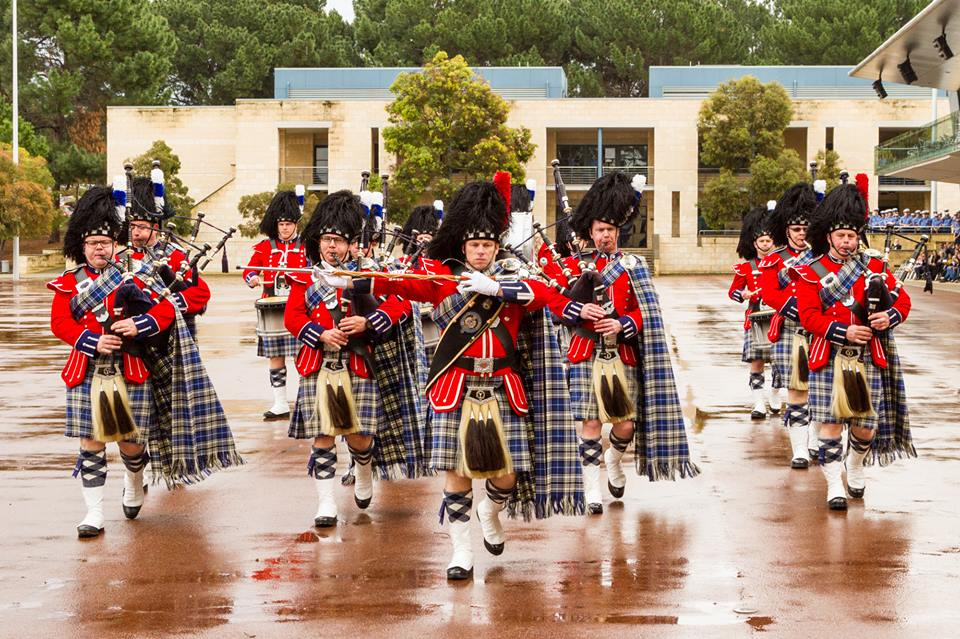
The band at a police recruit graduation

The original Western Australia Police Band was a brass band between 1902 and 1925. The WA Police Pipe Band, now commonly known as and referred to as WAPOL, was formed in 1966.

The band won the Grade 2 title at the World Pipe Band Championships in 1998, and was promoted to Grade 1 at the end of the season.

At the World Championships in 2004 the band qualified for the final and came 11th overall.

As of August 2016, WAPOL are the current Australian and South Pacific Grade 1 champions, having won this biennial national competition in 2012 and 2014 and are also the reigning WA Grade 1 Champions.

In 2004, the WA Police allowed civilians to become members of the police pipe band alongside officers, and as of 2019, most members of the WA Police pipe band are civilians, and therefore not police officers.

In 2020, the band made the decision to form a youth development program to encourage local interest in learning bagpipes and Scottish drumming.

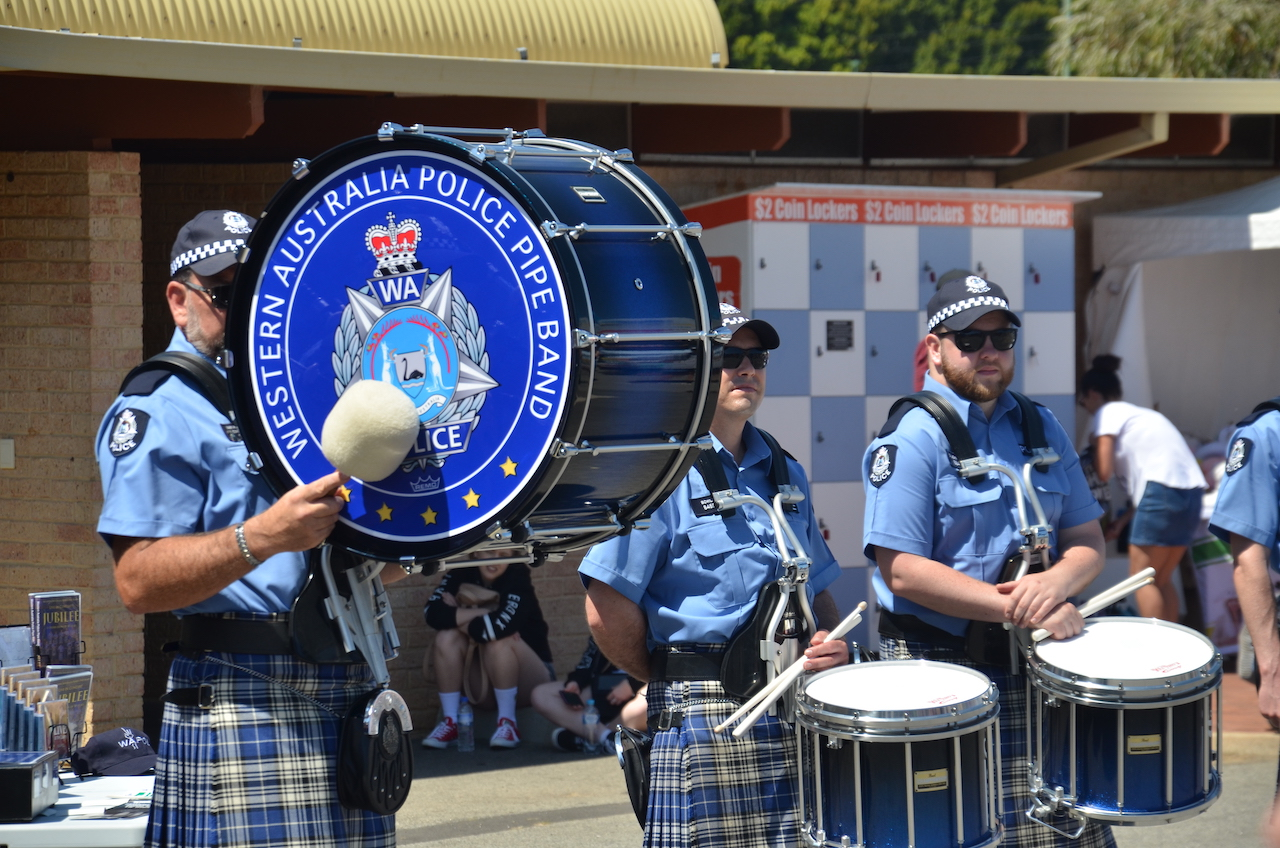
Western Australian Police Pipe Band at the RASWA September 2019

== Pipe majors ==
- James Murray (2012-2019)
- Stuart Robertson (Acting 2019-2020)
- Alisdair McLaren (2020–2022)
- Chris McDonald (2022-present)

== Leading drummers ==
- Gary Potter (2017-2020)
- David Johnston (2020–2021)
- Gary Potter (2021-present)

== Discography ==
- Seolauh Ur (1996)
- Music of the Gael (1998)
- Off Duty (2000)
