= Western Australian Hall of Champions =

Sports award honoring former athletes

The Western Australian Hall of Champions was created in 1983 by the then-recently created Western Australian Institute of Sport (WAIS). The Sportswriters' Association of Western Australia had suggested the development of a Hall of Champions to the Government of Western Australia, to honour past athletes from the state who had made a significant impact in their sport. It was inaugurated by Keith Wilson, the Minister for Sport and Recreation, on 19 August 1985.

Fourteen foundation inductees were made in 1985 and since then several new inductees are made each year at a dinner hosted by WAIS. The award is the highest honour that can be accorded a West Australian sportsperson.

The induction criteria are:

- The person must have achieved the highest level of open competition in his/her sport;
- The person must be product of the Western Australian sporting system, or have established their reputation while living in and representing Western Australia;
- The person must been retired from open competition for at least five years.

The award is separate from the Western Australian Sports Star of the Year which is given to currently competing sportspeople.

== Inductees ==
Hall of Champions foundational member	Hall of Champions Legend	Hall of Champions foundational member and Legend	Hall of Champions membership revoked

Name	Sport	Year of induction	Notes
1985	Steele Bishop	Cycling	
1985	Barry Cable	Australian rules football	Cable's membership was revoked on 22 June 2023 due to legal findings that he sexually abused a child.
1985	Herb Elliott	Athletics	
1985	Graham Farmer	Australian rules football	
1985	Dennis Lillee	Cricket	
1985	Walter Lindrum	Billiards	
1985	Bob Marshall	Billiards	
1985	Rod Marsh	Cricket	
1985	Lyn McClements (later Lyn McKenzie)	Swimming	
1985	Graham McKenzie	Cricket	
1985	George Moloney	Australian rules football	
1985	Shirley Strickland (later Shirley de la Hunty)	Athletics	
1985	William 'Nipper' Truscott	Australian rules football	
1985	John Winter	Athletics	
1986	Jerry Dolan	Australian rules football	
1986	Brian Glencross	Field hockey	
1986	Brian Griffin	Lacrosse	
1986	John Inverarity	Cricket	
1986	Johnny Leonard	Australian rules football	
1986	Phil Matson	Australian rules football	
1986	Frank Moore	Horse racing	
1986	Don Morrison	Surf lifesaving	
1986	Decima Norman (later Decima Hamilton)	Athletics	
1986	Eric Pearce	Field hockey	
1986	May Pearce (later May Campbell)	Field hockey	
1986	Don Smart	Field hockey	
1986	Rolly Tasker	Yachting	
1986	Frank Treen	Horse racing	
1987	Dixie Ingram	Athletics	
1987	Ron Johnson	Speedway	
1987	Frank Kersley	Harness racing	
1987	Merv McIntosh	Australian rules football	
1987	Julian Pearce	Field hockey	
1987	Barry Shepherd	Cricket	
1987	Bill Walker	Australian rules football	
1988	George Doig	Australian rules football	
1988	David Neesham	Water polo	
1988	Percy Oliver	Swimming	
1988	Ian Tomlinson	Athletics	
1988	Barbara Wall	Squash	
1988	Clive Wilderspin	Tennis	
1989	Trevor Bickle	Athletics	
1989	Ray Evans	Field hockey	
1989	Jack Sheedy	Australian rules football	
1989	Gaye Teede	Netball	
1989	Bruce Yardley	Cricket	
1990	Ian Cairns	Surfing	
1990	Mavis Gray (née Beckett)	Field hockey	
1990	Kevin O'Halloran	Swimming	
1991	Jack Clarke	Australian rules football	
1991	Bob Massie	Cricket	
1991	Jean Pearce (later Jean Wynne)	Field hockey	
1991	Annette Simper (née Foley)	Netball	
1992	Marian Bell (later Marian Aylmore)	Field hockey	
1992	Peter Evans	Swimming	
1992	Graham Moss	Australian rules football	
1992	Ernest Parker	Cricket & Tennis	
1993	Neil Brooks	Swimming	
1993	Ern Henfry	Australian rules football	
1993	Lesley Hunt	Tennis	
1993	Jill McIntosh	Netball	
1994	Ross Glendinning	Australian rules football	
1994	Kim Hughes	Cricket	
1994	Evelyn de Lacy (née Whillier)	Swimming	
1995	Ric Charlesworth	Field hockey	
1995	Steve Marsh	Australian rules football	
1995	J. J. Miller	Horse racing	
1995	Ken Vidler	Surf lifesaving	
1996	Elspeth Denning (aka Elspeth Clement-Denning and Elspeth Denning-Clement. née Elspeth Swain)	Field hockey	
1996	Tom Hoad	Water polo	
1996	Gary Marocchi	Association football	
1996	Lorraine McCoulough-Fry	Disabled Swimming	
1996	Lynne Watson (later Lynne Bates)	Swimming	
1997	David Bell	Field hockey	
1997	Connie Hicks (née Haigh)	Lawn bowls	
1997	John Todd	Australian rules football	
1998	Brad Hardie	Australian rules football	
1998	Graham Marsh	Golf	
1998	Phil May	Athletics	
1999	Terry Alderman	Cricket	
1999	Sharon Buchanan	Field hockey	
1999	Stephen Michael	Australian rules football	
2000	Brian Peake	Australian rules football	
2000	Christine Stanton	Athletics	
2000	Terry Walsh	Field hockey	
2001	Jodie Cooper	Surfing	
2001	Geoff Marsh	Cricket	
2001	Elsma Merillo (née Harris)	Netball	
2002	Fred Kersley Jr.	Harness racing	
2002	Wendy Pritchard (née Butcher)	Field hockey	
2002	Graeme Wood	Cricket	
2003	Haydn Bunton	Australian rules football	
2003	Jackie Pereira	Field hockey	
2003	Dean Williams	Squash	
2004	Jeff Kennedy	Lacrosse	
2004	George Owens	Australian rules football	
2005	Rechelle Hawkes	Field hockey	
2005	Bernie Naylor	Australian rules football	
2005	Bruce Reid	Cricket	
2006	Priya Cooper	Swimming	
2006	Craig Davies	Field hockey	
2006	Bridgette Gusterson	Water polo	
2007	Michelle Hager	Field hockey	
2007	Luc Longley	Basketball	
2008	Jim Schrader	Harness racing	
2008	Kate Starre	Field hockey	
2009	Maxine Bishop	Golf	
2009	Sammy Clarke	Australian rules football	
2009	Darryn Hill	Cycling	
2010	Peter Matera	Australian rules football	
2010	Louise Sauvage	Wheelchair racing	
2011	Chris Lewis	Harness racing	
2011	Denis Marshall	Association football	
2011	Allana Slater	Gymnastics	
2012	Justin Langer	Cricket	
2012	Lorraine Packham	Field hockey	
2013	Danielle Woodhouse (née Gusterson) OAM	Water polo	
2014	1961 WA State Football Team	Australian rules football	
2014	Ryan Bayley	Cycling	
2014	Shelley Taylor-Smith	Marathon swimming	
2015	Adam Gilchrist	Cricket	
2015	Stan Lazaridis	Association football	
2016	1967–68 Western Australian State Cricket Team	Cricket	
2016	Tully Bevilaqua	Women's basketball	
2017	Sally Ironmonger	Netball	
2017	Dean Kemp	Australian rules football	
2018	1969-72 Western Australian Women's State Netball Team	Netball	
2018	Gary Buckenara	Australian rules football	
2018	Bevan George	Field hockey	
2018	Belinda Stowell	Yachting	
2019	Justin Eveson	Wheelchair basketball	
2019	Tessa Parkinson	Sailing	
2019	Elise Rechichi	Sailing	
2019	Eamon Sullivan	Swimming	
2020	1985-91 Western Australian Women's State Hockey Team	Field Hockey	
2020	Amber Bradley	Rowing	
2020	Terry Gale	Golf	
2020	Todd Pearson	Swimming	
2021	Lauren Mitchell	Gymnastics	
2021	Brad Ness	Wheelchair basketball	
2022	Ken McAullay	Australian Football	
2022	Bill Kirby	Swimming	
2024	1992 West Coast Eagles team	Australian football	
2024	Tony Adamson	Baseball	
2024	Damon Diletti	Field hockey	
2024	Michael Hussey	Cricket	
2024	Matthew Pavlich	Australian football	
2024	Elizabeth Smylie	Tennis	
