= Lloyd Rayney =

Australian barrister and prosecutor

Lloyd Patrick Rayney (b. Aden, Yemen 1962) is a former Western Australian barrister and Crown prosecutor who came to prominence when he was charged and acquitted in 2012 of the murder or manslaughter of his wife Corryn Rayney. In 2017, he succeeded in a defamation action against the State of Western Australia over police behaviour and was awarded a record sum of $A2.62 million. In a long-running action, the WA Legal Professional Complaints Committee and the State Administrative Tribunal had his practising certificate cancelled for "professional misconduct" and "knowingly giving false evidence".

== Acquittal ==
Rayney's wife, Corryn, was murdered in August 2007. In the following month, Rayney was publicly named by police as "the prime and only suspect", though he was not charged with the murder until December 2010, more than three years after the event. In a three-month trial which began on 16 July 2012, he was found not guilty. Three interstate judges unanimously dismissed a prosecution appeal, and upheld the trial judge's verdict.

== Defamation suits ==
=== Rayney v Hughes ===
In 2003, Rayney sued art critic Robert Hughes for allegedly calling him a "curry muncher" in the course of a trial at which Rayney was a Crown prosecutor. The action was settled out of court.

=== Rayney v State of Western Australia ===
In March 2017, the Supreme Court began hearing Rayney's claim against the state for compensation over a WA Police media conference in September 2007, during which a senior officer called him "the prime and only suspect" in the death of his wife. Judge John Chaney had ordered that the case be heard by a judge sitting alone.

Witnesses at the defamation hearing included close relatives of the murder victim who shared a belief that Rayney was the killer. Rayney's counsel "accused them of bias and feeding gossip to the police."

In a judgment handed down on 15 December 2017, Judge Chaney ruled that the officer's words "in their entirety, bore the imputation that the plaintiff murdered his wife" and awarded preliminary damages of $600,000 "for the harm to his reputation, personal hurt and distress caused." On 20 December, the judge awarded additional sums for economic losses and interest, bringing the total award to $2,623,416 – "almost four times as large as the previous biggest defamation award in W.A." The judgment was highly critical of the police, finding that senior officers involved in the investigation into Ms Rayney's murder "had formed a prejudicial view" of Mr Rayney and had "taken the approach of assessing [his] actions and words against an assumption of guilt".

The West Australian estimated that amounts owing to lawyers engaged in the contest would swell the state's total payout to $13 million. Notwithstanding his earlier reported offer to represent the state on a "pro bono" basis, Terrence Tobin QC, was said to be charging $3.3 million and Rayney's legal team more than $2 million for the trial, in addition to "a further $5 million in other legal fees in the years leading up to the defamation trial".

==== Appeal ====
In January 2018, Rayney lodged an appeal against the judgment, seeking an increase in the damages component of the awarded compensation, which covered only three years' loss of income—from when the defamation was broadcast, to when he was charged with his wife's murder in December 2010. Rayney had argued that the damage to his career extended over 10 years, warranting compensation of $11 million.

== Professional misconduct ==
On 2 August 2019, Rayney's bid for additional defamation damages was stayed while he appealed findings of professional misconduct by the Western Australian Administrative Appeals Tribunal.

In April 2020, that appeal was dismissed by the full bench of the WA Supreme Court and he was struck off the West Australian roll of practitioners for "professional misconduct" and "knowingly giving false evidence".
