= Alisdair McLaren =

Australian bagpiper (born 1979)

- Born: 1979 (age 46–47); Perth, Western Australia
- Occupations: Instrumentalist, music director
- Instrument: Bagpipes

Alisdair McLaren (born 1979) is an Australian bagpiper. He is currently the Pipe Major of the Pipes and Drums of the Royal Edinburgh Military Tattoo, the former Pipe Major of the Grade One Western Australia Police Pipe Band, and the former director of The National Youth Pipe Band of Scotland. After moving to Scotland from Kalamunda, Australia, in 2007 became a member of the National Piping Centre in Glasgow and in 2011 became the first West-Australian to win the World Pipe Band Championships as part of the Field Marshal Montgomery Pipe Band.

Prior to his move to Scotland, McLaren attended Trinity College and was pipe major of Trinity College Pipes and Drums until 1997 when he joined the WA Police Pipe Band for 10 years.

In January 2020, McLaren resigned from the post of director of the National Youth Pipe Band of Scotland to return to his native Australia.

In May 2020 he was appointed Pipe Major of the Western Australia Police Pipe Band. He resigned in 2022.

Alisdair is now Head of Pipe Band and Piping Tuition at Presbyterian Ladies College, Perth which is one of only a handful of all female pipe bands left in the world.
