= Peter Kelly (cricketer) =

Australian cricketer (1942–2023)

Personal information
- Full name: Peter Charles Kelly
- Born: 28 April 1942; Sydney, Australia
- Died: 11 October 2023 (aged 81)
- Batting: Right-handed
- Role: Opening batsman

Domestic team information
- Years: Team
- 1962/63: New South Wales
- 1964/65–1966/67: Western Australia

Career statistics
Competition	First-class
Matches	23
Runs scored	1,611
Batting average	40.27
100s/50s	4/7
Top score	132
Balls bowled	73
Wickets	0
Bowling average	–
5 wickets in innings	0
10 wickets in match	–
Best bowling	–
Catches/stumpings	10/–
- Source: ESPNcricinfo, 22 October 2023

Peter Charles Kelly (28 April 1942 – 11 October 2023) was an Australian cricketer. He played twenty-three first-class matches for New South Wales and Western Australia between 1962–63 and 1966–67.

A right-handed opening batsman, Kelly had an outstanding season for Western Australia in 1965–66, when he scored four centuries, including two in one match (119 and 108*) against the touring English team. Kelly died in October 2023, at the age of 81.
