= Ramsay Bogunovich =

Australian rules footballer

Personal information
- Full name: Ramsay Paul Bogunovich
- Born: 23 March 1961 (age 65)
- Original team: Swan Districts
- Height: 200 cm (6 ft 7 in)
- Weight: 103 kg (227 lb)

Playing career^{1}
Years	Club	Games (Goals)
1981–1982	Geelong	6 (1)
- ^{1} Playing statistics correct to the end of 1982.

Ramsay Paul Bogunovich (born 23 March 1961) is a former Australian rules footballer who played with Geelong in the Victorian Football League (VFL).

Bogunovich was recruited from Swan Districts in Western Australia. A ruckman, Bogunovich made six senior appearances for Geelong, two in the 1981 VFL season and four in the 1982 VFL season. He played in winning reserves grand finals for three successive years, 1980, 1981 and 1982. He returned to Western Australia in 1983, playing with West Perth for two further seasons.
