= Killing of Corryn Rayney =

Registrar, Supreme Court, Western Australia

Corryn Rayney
- Born: Corynn Veronica Ann Da Silva; 1963; Uganda
- Died: 7 August 2007 (aged 44); Kings Park, Perth, Australia
- Known for: Mysterious death and prosecution of her husband for her alleged murder

Corryn Veronica Ann Rayney (née Da Silva; 1963 – c. 7 August 2007) was an Australian lawyer and registrar of the Supreme Court of Western Australia whose disappearance and unsolved killing in Perth became one of the state's most prominent criminal cases. She was last seen alive on 7 August 2007, and her body was later discovered in a shallow grave in Kings Park, although the precise cause of her death could not be determined. Her husband Lloyd Rayney, a prominent barrister specialising in criminal prosecution, was charged with her murder, but found not guilty after a trial before a judge only. The acquittal was unanimously upheld by a court of appeal in August 2013. The state's police commissioner and attorney general declined to acknowledge documented procedural mistakes, and refused to instigate a fresh search for the killers, leading to calls for a federal investigation into the matter.

She was last seen alive at 9.30 p.m. on 7 August 2007 at a boot scooting class. A week later, police discovered her abandoned car and followed a trail of oil from it to the grave in Kings Park. At the time, Lloyd Rayney was involved in a Corruption and Crime Commission inquiry into the misconduct of police officers in a murder investigation.

== Background ==
Corryn Veronica Ann Da Silva was born in Africa to Indian parents in 1963. She grew up in Uganda during the reign of Idi Amin before her family moved to Australia in 1973 as refugees. Corryn had family roots connected to Goa. She attended Rossmoyne Senior High School and studied law at the University of Western Australia.

The Rayneys lived in the Perth suburb of Como and had two daughters, Caitlyn (born 1994) and Sarah (born 1997). Corryn Rayney was employed as a registrar at the Supreme Court of Western Australia. She was a close friend of magistrate Elizabeth Woods.

== Disappearance and cause of death ==
Rayney was reported missing on 7 August 2007, having last been seen at her weekly boot scooting class in Bentley the previous night. Her vehicle, a 2005 Ford Fairmont, was also missing. On 14 August, her car was found abandoned on a residential street in Subiaco. Police subsequently followed an oil leak to Kings Park, where they located her body on 16 August in a shallow grave off Lovekin Drive. It was announced the police would be treating her death as a murder inquiry. Her funeral was held on 1 September.

At the trial of Rayney's husband, forensic doctor John Hilton and neuropathologist Victoria Fabian both testified that the cause of death was not clear, but that she had sustained injuries to her head, neck and brain. Fabian testified that the injuries indicated some form of neck restraint had been employed, though not to the point of strangulation, and that the injuries were not sufficient to cause death. She noted that the bleeding had been found between Rayney's intervertebral discs, which only occurred in cases of traumatic injury. Hilton testified that this bleeding could have arisen from a combination of compressive forces and rabbit punches to the back of the neck. However, he also stated that "he could not exclude the possibility Mrs Rayney received her neck injuries as she was placed head-first into her bush grave at Kings Park", although they definitely occurred prior to death and there was little to suggest that she had been alive at the time of burial. He further stated there was no evidence of drugs or poison in her system.

== Investigation ==
Although Lloyd Rayney was controversially described by the chief police investigator Senior Sergeant Jack Lee as the "only suspect" at a police press conference in September 2007, he was not charged with the murder until December 2010, more than three years after the event.

== Trial ==
At the request of the defendant in October 2011, the trial was heard by a judge only, with no jury. The reasons for the application were suppressed at the time, but later published in March 2012. Lloyd Rayney wanted a trial without a jury, on the grounds that the extensive publicity would make a fair jury trial impossible to achieve. The decision to conduct the trial without a jury was a subject of debate in Australian legal circles.

Former Northern Territory Chief Justice Brian Ross Martin was appointed as an Acting Justice of the Western Australia Supreme Court in February 2012 to preside over the trial; a judge from outside Western Australia being used to ensure impartiality, given that both the victim and accused had held senior legal positions in the state. The trial began on 16 July 2012.

An affidavit filed by the prosecutors indicated that the case was circumstantial. The prosecutor's opening address to the trial said that the state's case was circumstantial but the evidence of motive was compelling. The prosecution hypothesised that Lloyd Rayney had killed his wife at the family home in Como, then dragging her along the driveway to her car, driving to Kings Park, burying her body, abandoning her car, and returning home. The circumstantial evidence presented included a dinner place card with Lloyd Rayney's name found near the burial site, brick dust and soil that was allegedly consistent with being dragged along a driveway, and liquidambar seed pods found in her hair that were alleged to match a tree at the family home which was not present in Kings Park. The prosecution also presented evidence that the Rayneys' marriage had broken down irretrievably due to Lloyd Rayney's affairs and gambling habits, having lost nearly $50,000 to Centrebet between April 2006 and July 2007. It was alleged that she had recently "put her husband on notice that if he did not disclose his finances, she would have his clients, from whom he received legal fees, subpoenaed", and that he had been secretly recording her phone calls and conversations.

The trial ran until 19 October 2012 when final submissions were presented by prosecutor John Agius QC and defence counsel David Edwardson QC. On 1 November, Justice Martin acquitted Lloyd Rayney when he handed down a judgment of not guilty, saying that the "case by the State is beset by improbabilities and uncertainties". The full reasons for the verdict were published, a requirement which would not have applied to a jury verdict.

The trial judge closely examined evidence on the conduct of Lloyd Rayney and reportedly described him as a barrister who had engaged in "disreputable conduct" in comments which were redacted from the final official judgment (para 1594), and Justice Martin noted that "The accused has engaged in discreditable conduct including knowingly arranging for illegal telephone interception, making a false declaration and giving deliberately false evidence to a court while on oath. The evidence raises suspicion; in some instances quite strong suspicion. But discreditable conduct does not prove guilt, and suspicion, even strong suspicion, falls well short of proof beyond reasonable doubt." The Judgment Summary further explained: "Evidence concerning such conduct was not admitted to show that the accused is a person of bad character. The fact that the accused engaged in discreditable conduct and could, therefore, be viewed as a person of bad character, cannot be used to reason that the accused is the type of person who might kill his wife, or that by reason of his bad character he is likely to have killed her. Such reasoning would be unfair and is prohibited."

== Appeal ==
An appeal by prosecutors against the verdict was held in the Supreme Court of Western Australia in August 2013, before three judges brought in from other states: Mark Weinberg, Anthony Whealy and Terence Buddin. The prosecution, if granted leave to appeal, proposed to rely on the grounds that the trial judge's findings in relation to motive were not supported by the facts his Honour found in relation to the respective attitudes of the respondent and the deceased. The judges unanimously dismissed the appeal, and upheld the trial judge's verdict. The office of the NSW Director of Public Prosecutions, which ran the case, announced on 18 October 2013 that it would not be seeking a further appeal to the High Court.

== Aftermath ==
Rayney indicated interest in whether there would be consequences for "police who the trial judge said gave misleading evidence, pressured a forensic pathologist to change his report, abused their position of authority and behaved reprehensibly".

An investigation by the Western Australian Corruption and Crime Commission later cleared two police officers of "any serious misconduct" after their behaviour in threatening a female lawyer had been described as ranging from "inappropriate to reprehensible" by the trial judge. A second matter reviewed by the CCC related to "attempts by a third officer to encourage an independent pathologist involved in the case to change a report to better fit police evidence. That officer was found to have acted unreasonably."

In May 2015, Rayney was acquitted of two charges of tapping his own residential telephone line.

In December 2017, the Supreme Court of Western Australia awarded Rayney $2.62 million in damages in a defamation action against the State, over his having been publicly named as "the prime and only suspect". Rayney lodged an appeal against the decision in January 2018, seeking higher damages. Rayney commenced a second defamation action in June 2015 in relation to comments made by a forensic investigator who worked with WA Police during the investigation.

In July 2015, Rayney's licence was cancelled by the Legal Practice Board, stripping him of his right to practise law in WA. This action resulted from a finding by a magistrate that he had breached the Surveillance Devices Act by taping conversations with Corryn Rayney, then deliberately disposing of the recording devices when he knew the police had a warrant to search for them. In February 2016, Rayney was cleared by the State Administrative Tribunal of the alleged "unlawful destruction of evidence and/or an attempt to pervert the course of justice" and his right to practise was reinstated. He recommenced his career with the successful defence of an accused drug dealer. The trial was aborted when police evidence was shown to have been unlawfully "destroyed, missing and contradictory".

On 21 April 2020, Rayney was struck off by Legal Practice Board. The barrister and former Crown prosecutor has been officially struck off as a lawyer following a legal battle, which attempted to keep him on the roll. The full bench of the Supreme Court of Western Australia has made the decision to remove Lloyd Rayney from the roll of solicitors in what represents the end to a five-year-long legal battle. The court found that the Perth-based barrister should be struck off for secretly recording his late wife, Corryn Rayney's, conversations and then knowingly giving false evidence about those recordings in court.

Rayney sued one of the lead forensic investigators on the case in 2020 for allegedly making defamatory comments at a seminar at Curtin University in 2014. He was awarded $438,000 in damages.

== Calls for new investigation ==
In his judgment summary, Justice Martin noted that police and forensic evidence was consistent with a sexual attack on Mrs Rayney, while defence lawyers identified at least two possible criminals who "should have been investigated with as much rigour as Mr Rayney". In a prime-time TV presentation on 21 August 2014 that was dismissed by Attorney General Michael Mischin as "infotainment that is one-sided", Rayney, backed by senior lawyers and a forensic scientist, spoke out for the first time and called for independent investigators to re-examine the unsolved case. State Premier Colin Barnett did not see any need for a review but would await advice from his Attorney General.

In May 2015, WA Police Commissioner Karl O'Callaghan ordered a cold case review of the matter which had not resulted in any new charges by March 2017, when a court began hearing Rayney's defamation suit against the state. Judgment was handed down on 15 December 2017 in favour of Rayney, with final damages to be assessed. He was ultimately awarded $2.62 million in damages, one of the highest defamation payouts in Australian history.

In November 2022, Rayney called for a new probe into Corryn Rayney's death, as new witnesses had come forward claiming to have provided evidence to the police which was not investigated.

== See also ==
- Lists of solved missing person cases
- List of unsolved murders (2000–present)
- List of unsolved murders in Western Australia
