= Marian Bell (field hockey) =

Australian hockey player (born 1958)

Personal information
- Nationality: Australian
- Born: 4 August 1958 (age 67)

Sport
- Sport: Field hockey

Marian Bell (married name Marian Aylmore) (born 4 August 1958 at Cowaramup, Western Australia) is a former Australian field hockey player. Bell played in 50 international matches for Australia.

She captained the Australian team 10 times to 1983, including the Hockey World Cup before temporarily retiring to prepare for the birth of her daughter. After a break of just five months she competed at the 1984 Olympics in Los Angeles.

Bell was inducted into the Western Australian Hall of Champions in 1992.
