= Mel Pearce =

Australian hockey player

Personal information
- Full name: Melville George Arthur Pearce
- Nationality: Australian
- Born: 9 January 1928 Jabalpur, British India
- Died: 27 April 2011 (aged 83) Perth, Australia

Sport
- Sport: Field hockey

Melville George Arthur Pearce (9 January 1928 – 27 April 2011) was an Indian-born Australian field hockey player. He competed in the men's tournament at the 1956 Summer Olympics.
