= Gordon Pearce =

Australian field hockey player

Medal record

Men's field hockey

Representing Australia
Silver medal – second place	1968 Mexico City	Team

Gordon Charles Pearce (born 10 January 1934 in Jabalpur, Madhya Pradesh, India) is an Indian-born Australian field hockey player who competed in the 1956 Summer Olympics, in the 1960 Summer Olympics, and in the 1968 Summer Olympics for Australia.

Pearce is the fourth of five brothers who represented Australia in hockey in the 1950s and 1960s.

In later life Pearce became a senior public servant within the Western Australian Public Service: In 1987 he was chief executive of the office of the Premier of Western Australia and in 1990 was appointed Chief Executive to the WA Inc Royal Commission by premier Carmen Lawrence. In 1995 he was appointed a member in the general division of the Order of Australia.

He is the grandfather of Australian Kookaburras representative, Jake Harvie.
