= Sun Belt Conference =

U.S. college sports conference

- Association: NCAA
- Founded: 1976; 50 years ago
- Commissioner: Keith Gill (since 2019)
- Sports fielded: 19; men's: 9; women's: 10
- Division: Division I
- Subdivision: FBS
- No. of teams: 14 (13 in 2027)
- Headquarters: New Orleans, Louisiana
- Region: Southern United States
- Broadcaster: ESPN
- Website: sunbeltsports.org

Locations

The Sun Belt Conference (SBC) is a collegiate athletic conference that has been affiliated with the NCAA's Division I since 1976. Originally a non-football conference, the Sun Belt began sponsoring football in 2001. Its football teams participate in the Division I Football Bowl Subdivision (FBS). The 14 member institutions of the Sun Belt are distributed across ten states in the Southern United States.

== History ==
=== 1970s and 1980s ===
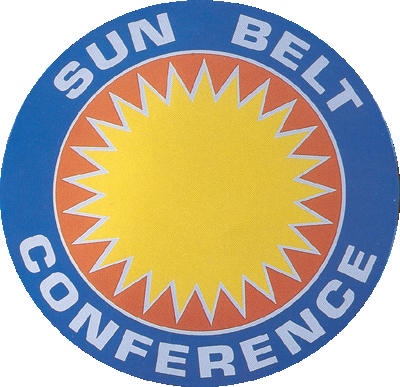
Original Sun Belt logo from 1976

The Sun Belt Conference was founded on August 4, 1976, with the University of New Orleans (now LSU New Orleans), the University of South Alabama, Georgia State University, Jacksonville University, the University of North Carolina at Charlotte, and the University of South Florida. Over the next ten years the conference would add Western Kentucky University, Old Dominion University, the University of Alabama at Birmingham, and Virginia Commonwealth University. New Orleans was forced out of the league in 1980 due to its small on-campus gymnasium that the conference did not deem suitable for conference competition (the conference rejected UNO's offer to play all conference home games at the Louisiana Superdome). New Orleans competed as an independent before joining the newly formed American South Conference in 1987.

=== 1990s ===
After the 1990–91 basketball season, all members of the Sun Belt, except Western Kentucky, South Alabama, and Jacksonville, departed for other conferences. The Sun Belt, including incoming member the University of Arkansas at Little Rock, then merged with the American South Conference, made up of Arkansas State University, Louisiana Tech University, the University of Southwestern Louisiana (now the University of Louisiana at Lafayette), the University of Texas–Pan American (now merged into the University of Texas Rio Grande Valley), New Orleans (re-joined), Lamar University, and the University of Central Florida. Although the American South was the larger conference, the merged league retained the Sun Belt name. In 1991, the league first began to explore the idea of sponsoring football.

Central Florida left the league following the 1991–92 academic year due to a dispute over television rights, among other reasons. Lamar, Texas–Pan American, and Jacksonville departed at the end of the 1997–98 academic year. Florida International University joined the Sun Belt in 1998, and the University of Denver was added in 1999. Louisiana Tech departed after the 2000–01 academic year.

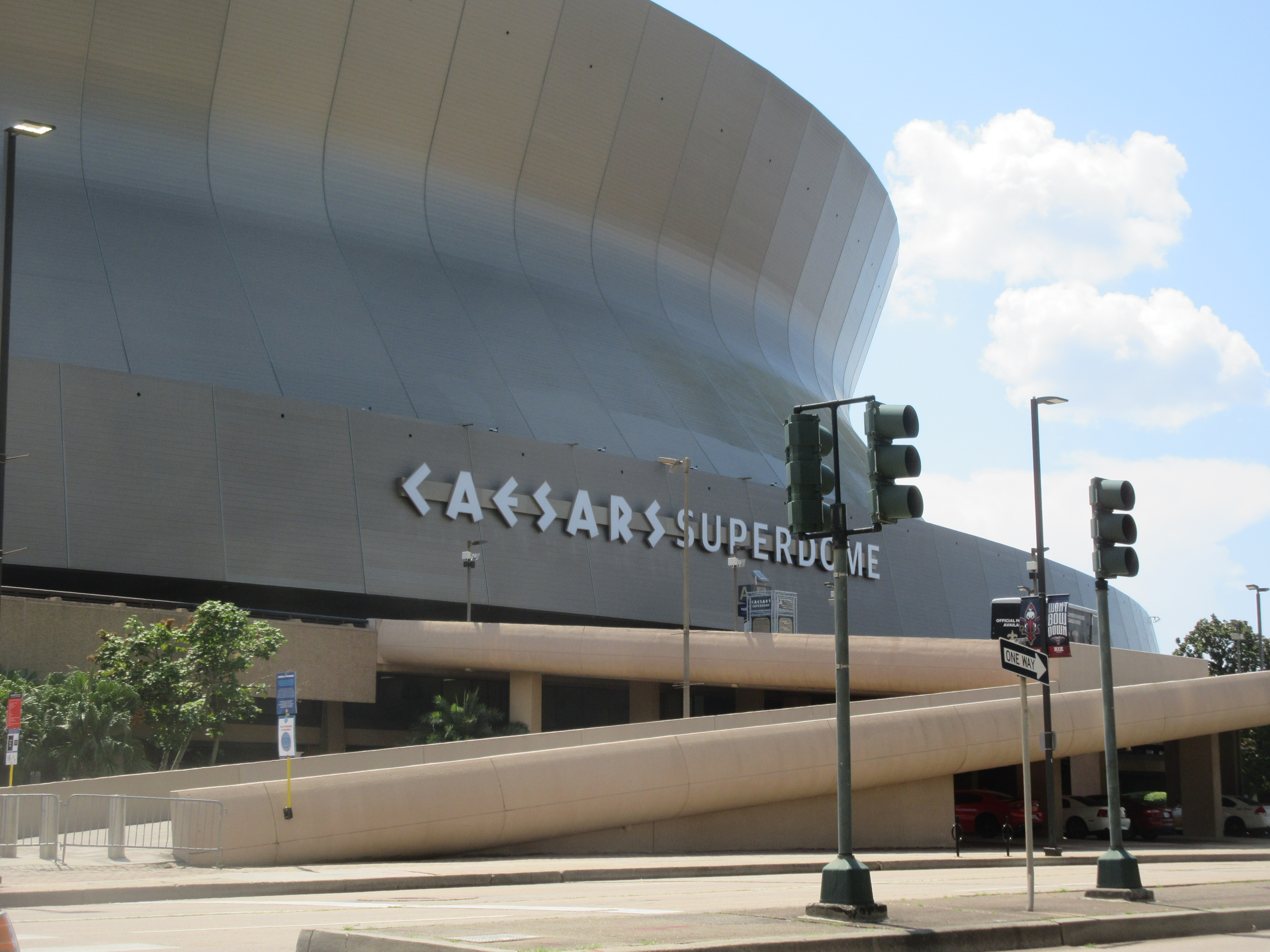
The Sun Belt Conference headquarters are currently housed at the Caesars Superdome.

=== 2000s ===
The conference did not sponsor football until 2001, when the league added former Big West Conference members New Mexico State University and the University of North Texas and former Ohio Valley Conference member (an FBS Independent on football) Middle Tennessee State University as full members (all three of them joined a year earlier for all sports in the 2000–01 school year) and added FBS Independent University of Louisiana at Monroe and Big West member University of Idaho as football-only members. These new members gave the Sun Belt seven football playing members in their first season, as Arkansas State and Louisiana were already full members which sponsored football. Another Big West school, Utah State University, was added as a football-only member in 2003, then departed in 2005 with Idaho and New Mexico State for the Western Athletic Conference (WAC).

In 2004, Troy University became a football-only member before joining for all sports in the 2005–06 academic year. In 2005, Florida Atlantic became a football-only member before joining for all sports in the 2006–07 academic year. In 2006, Louisiana–Monroe joined the conference as an all-sports full member when the Warhawks left their former home, the Southland Conference.

Longtime Sun Belt member Western Kentucky joined the Sun Belt's football conference in 2009 after its board of regents voted to upgrade the school's football program to Division I FBS.

On November 11, 2009, New Orleans announced it was investigating a move from Division I to the NCAA's Division III. In order to maintain athletic scholarships, UNO instead opted for entry into Division II. On April 20, 2011, UNO officially received transition approval from the NCAA Division II Membership Committee. (UNO later decided to remain in Division I, and joined the Southland Conference, which has four other members in Louisiana, in 2013.)

=== 2010s ===
The former Sun Belt Conference logo used until its rebranding in 2013

On April 9, 2012, Georgia State, one of the founding members of the Sun Belt Conference, announced that it would be returning to the conference as a full member in 2013. As part of the move, the football program began a transition from FCS to FBS in the 2012 season; it played a full Sun Belt schedule as a "transitional" FBS member in 2013, and became a full FBS member, with bowl eligibility, in 2014. On May 2, 2012, Texas State University announced it would leave the WAC after just one year and join the Sun Belt in July 2013 to begin play for the 2013–14 academic year. At the press conference to announce Texas State's addition, Sun Belt Commissioner Karl Benson also hinted that more changes could be on the way for the conference. On May 25, 2012, the conference announced that the University of Texas at Arlington (a non-football member) had accepted an invitation to join the conference and would become a full member by 2013.

On May 4, 2012, FIU and North Texas announced that they would be leaving the Sun Belt for Conference USA on July 1, 2013, as part of a Conference USA expansion effort involving four other schools. On November 29, 2012, Florida Atlantic and Middle Tennessee State announced that they would also leave the Sun Belt for Conference USA. The move for Florida Atlantic and MTSU was originally scheduled to take place in 2014; however, the two schools announced on January 28, 2013, that they would leave for Conference USA a year early, departing on July 1, 2013, with FIU and North Texas. Western Kentucky also accepted an invitation to join Conference USA on April 1, 2013, and departed from the Sun Belt on July 1, 2014.

The former Sun Belt Conference logo used from 2013 to 2020

These moves depleted the Sun Belt and made the need to expand their membership more urgent than ever, as the Sun Belt was left with ten full members and only eight members that sponsor football (the minimum number required for a conference to sponsor football at the FBS level) for the 2013 season. Appalachian State University accepted an invitation on March 27, 2013, to join the Sun Belt effective July 1, 2014. Georgia Southern University accepted a similar Sun Belt invitation at the same time as Appalachian State. Appalachian State and Georgia Southern both joined for all sports from the Southern Conference on July 1, 2014. Both schools had been very successful within the Football Championship Subdivision, combining to win nine national championships since 1985. They upgraded to the Football Bowl Subdivision, and were eligible for Sun Belt conference championships in 2014, but were not postseason-eligible in football until 2015.

The Sun Belt also granted football-only invites to Idaho and New Mexico State on March 28, 2013. Idaho and New Mexico State were both former Sun Belt members (Idaho for football only, New Mexico State for all sports) from 2001 to 2005. The large number of defections from the WAC forced that conference to drop football after the 2012 season. Idaho and New Mexico State were the only remaining WAC members that sponsored football, and competed as FBS independents for the 2013 season before competing in the Sun Belt in 2014. Idaho is located by far the farthest away from the other Sun Belt conference members, but it was rejected by the Mountain West Conference, leaving it with no other choice.

On September 1, 2015, Coastal Carolina University accepted an invitation to join the Sun Belt Conference. The university joined in all sports except for football starting July 1, 2016, with football joining in 2017.

The conference announced on March 1, 2016, that the affiliation agreement with Idaho and New Mexico State would not be extended past the 2017 season.

The conference announced that beginning in 2018, the conference (10 teams) would be divided into two divisions for football: East: Appalachian State, Coastal Carolina, Georgia Southern, Georgia State, and Troy; West: Arkansas State, Louisiana, Louisiana–Monroe, South Alabama, and Texas State. The winner of each division will meet in the Sun Belt Championship game.

=== 2020s ===
Sun Belt Conference members
— Full member
— Departing member
— Associate member (beach volleyball)
— Associate member (men's soccer)

Following the July 30, 2021 announcement of the University of Texas at Austin and the University of Oklahoma both moving from the Big 12 Conference to the Southeastern Conference, the world of college athletics faced the prospect of realignment once again. The Big 12 responded on September 10 by adding three schools from the American Athletic Conference (now known as the American Conference) and BYU, an FBS independent and otherwise a member of the non-football West Coast Conference, effective in 2023. The American in turn responded on October 21 by adding six schools from Conference USA (C-USA), with 2023 as the most likely entry date. Following this move, rumors began to circulate that the Sun Belt was planning to take on another three members (the University of Southern Mississippi (Southern Miss or USM), Marshall University, and former Sun Belt member Old Dominion University) from C-USA, likely in response to that conference's remaining teams worried of the conference folding. These moves would help to establish the market areas for the Sun Belt and The American, which cover similar geographic footprints. The American would now have most of its members in metropolitan areas, while the Sun Belt would instead have its members in smaller college towns.

On October 22, The Action Network reported that Southern Miss had been accepted as a new Sun Belt member, with 2023 as the likely entry date. The report also stated that the Sun Belt would add three more members—the aforementioned Marshall and Old Dominion, plus James Madison University, a member of the FCS Colonial Athletic Association (CAA). Southern Miss and Old Dominion were respectively announced as incoming members on October 26 and 27. At the time, both were to join no later than 2023. On October 29, the day after Marshall named its next president, both the Sun Belt and Marshall issued tweets announcing that school's entry; a formal announcement followed the next day and an introductory press conference was held on November 1. As for James Madison, its board met on October 29 to discuss a potential Sun Belt invitation, but its timeline was also affected by a Virginia state law that requires legislative approval for a four-year public school to move upward in athletic classification, including FCS to FBS. The legislative committee that must review the move did not meet until November 5, after the state's gubernatorial election. The committee unanimously approved JMU's move from FCS to FBS, and the Sun Belt move was officially announced on November 6. The original Action Network report also stated that the two full non-football SBC members, Little Rock and UT Arlington, would no longer be members of the conference after the 2022–23 school year.

Initial plans were for James Madison to compete as a de facto Sun Belt affiliate in sports other than football and men's soccer during the 2022–23 season. However, those plans would eventually change, with JMU and the SBC jointly announcing on February 2, 2022, that JMU would become a full SBC member, including football, in 2022–23.

By the end of January 2022, both non-football members would announce their departures for other conferences, effective that July. On December 8, 2021, the University of Arkansas Board of Trustees voted to accept an invitation for Little Rock to join the Ohio Valley Conference, and UT Arlington, which had been a Western Athletic Conference member in the 2012–13 school year, announced its return to that conference on January 21, 2022.

Shortly thereafter, Marshall, Old Dominion, and Southern Miss announced that they planned to leave C-USA for the Sun Belt in July 2022. They claimed to have notified C-USA of their plans in December 2021, apparently seeking to negotiate a 2022 exit. C-USA had indicated in late January 2022 that it expected the three schools to remain in that league through the 2022–23 school year. Marshall escalated the situation by filing suit against C-USA in its local court in an attempt to force a 2022 move. On March 29, Conference USA agreed to let Marshall, Old Dominion, and Southern Miss move to the Sun Belt starting July 1, 2022.

On April 6, with the entrance of three new men's soccer-sponsoring schools in James Madison, Marshall, and Old Dominion, the Sun Belt announced that men's soccer would be reinstated as a sponsored sport. The three aforementioned programs joined current Sun Belt members Coastal Carolina (previously affiliates with Conference USA) as well as Georgia State and Georgia Southern (previously affiliates with the Mid-American Conference). Additionally, it was announced that Kentucky, South Carolina, and West Virginia would join as men's soccer affiliate members beginning in fall 2022, giving the conference an inaugural soccer membership of 9. Kentucky and South Carolina were previously also affiliated with C-USA, while West Virginia was affiliated with the MAC. The SBC later announced it would add UCF as a men's soccer affiliate when that school joined the Big 12 Conference in 2023. In men's soccer, the conference is not a "mid-major" conference, but a "power" conference due to the quasi-alliance of the Big 12 and SEC schools, plus the presence of Marshall, which has played in two national championship games in the 2020s, winning one.

On June 6, the SBC presidents & chancellors approved adding two new women's sports, beach volleyball and swimming & diving, no later than the 2023–24 school year. They also announced that the conference would explore adding another women's sport, field hockey, at an undetermined future date.

On January 18, 2023, the SBC officially announced that its beach volleyball league would launch that spring, with the four full members sponsoring the sport joined by Charleston, Mercer, UNC Wilmington, and Stephen F. Austin as affiliate members.

On August 17, 2023, the SBC officially announced the return of women's swimming and diving as a sponsored sport. However, the SBC would only sponsor the sport for two seasons before dropping it after the 2024–25 season.

On June 30, 2025, Texas State accepted an offer to join the Pac-12 Conference by July 1, 2026, following the unanimous approval of the Texas State University System board of regents. On July 14, the SBC voted to replace Texas State with another regional member, Louisiana Tech of Conference USA, by as early as 2026. This addition would keep the installment of conference divisions intact, with Louisiana Tech replacing Texas State in the West Division. Louisiana Tech officially joined the Sun Belt on July 1, 2026 for the 2026–27 season.

A September 22, 2026 meeting of the Louisiana Board of Regents raised the possibility of more SBC membership changes. At this meeting, the regents discussed budgets of University of Louisiana System members—three of which are also SBC members (Louisiana, Louisiana Tech, and ULM). One regent suggested that all three schools, then facing significant athletic program deficits, drop from FBS to FCS. System president Rick Gallot told the regents that the system had contracted with Deloitte to evaluate the programs, with the system set to receive a final report by the end of 2026. At least one national journalist—Matt Brown, operator of the Extra Points college sports site—was skeptical about any of the schools being forced to leave FBS, remarking "My hunch — and this is just a hunch, because I haven’t lived in Louisiana for a long time — is that these comments are more about wanting to impose some sense of humility rather than an actual data-supported proposal." (emphasis in original)

== Member schools ==
=== Current full members ===
Members departing for the American Conference on July 1, 2027.

Institution	Location	Founded	Type	Enrollment	Median earnings	Nickname	Joined (Note: Represents the calendar year when fall sports competition begins.)	Colors
East Division
Appalachian State University	Boone, North Carolina	1899	Public	21,798	$54,010	Mountaineers	2014	
Coastal Carolina University	Conway, South Carolina	1954	Public	10,894	$52,398	Chanticleers	2016	
Georgia Southern University	Statesboro, Georgia	1906	Public	26,106	$62,342	Eagles	2014	
Georgia State University	Atlanta, Georgia	1913	Public	50,521	$58,898	Panthers	1976; 2013 (Note: Georgia State left after the 1980–81 school year; before rejoining again in 2013–14.)	
James Madison University	Harrisonburg, Virginia	1908	Public	21,496	$70,627	Dukes	2022	
Marshall University	Huntington, West Virginia	1837	Public	11,962	$54,141	Thundering Herd	2022	
Old Dominion University	Norfolk, Virginia	1930	Public	24,286	$64,472	Monarchs	1982; 2022 (Note: Old Dominion left after the 1990–91 school year; before rejoining again in 2022–23.)	
West Division
Arkansas State University	Jonesboro, Arkansas	1909	Public	14,109	$56,631	Red Wolves	1991	
University of Louisiana at Lafayette	Lafayette, Louisiana	1898	Public	19,188	$58,638	Ragin' Cajuns	1991	
University of Louisiana at Monroe	Monroe, Louisiana	1931	Public	9,060	$53,715	Warhawks	2006 (Note: Louisiana–Monroe (ULM) competed as an affiliate member for football from the 2001 to 2005 fall seasons (2001–02 to 2005–06 school years).)	
Louisiana Tech University	Ruston, Louisiana	1894	Public	12,039	$61,520	Bulldogs	1991; 2026 (Note: Louisiana Tech left after the 2000–01 school year; before rejoining again in 2026–27.)	
University of South Alabama	Mobile, Alabama	1963	Public	14,834	$62,459	Jaguars	1976	
University of Southern Mississippi	Hattiesburg, Mississippi	1910	Public	14,606	$48,593	Golden Eagles	2022	
Troy University	Troy, Alabama	1887	Public	17,494	$55,048	Trojans	2005 (Note: Troy competed as an affiliate member for football during the 2004 fall season (2004–05 school year).)	

=== Affiliate members ===
Institution	Location	Founded	Type	Enrollment	Nickname	Joined (Note: Represents the calendar year when fall sports competition begins.)	Colors	SBC sport(s)	Primary conference
University of Central Florida (UCF)	Orlando, Florida (Note: The main UCF campus has an Orlando mailing address but is in unincorporated Orange County.)	1963	Public	70,406	Knights	2023		Men's soccer	Big 12
College of Charleston	Charleston, South Carolina	1770	Public	10,468	Cougars	2022 (Note: The three beach volleyball associates (Charleston, Mercer and North Carolina–Wilmington [UNCW]) are listed as having joined in 2022, even though they were not announced as incoming affiliates until January 2023. The SBC's first beach volleyball season of 2023, which featured the four schools, was part of the 2022–23 school year.)		Beach volleyball	Coastal (CAA)
University of Kentucky	Lexington, Kentucky	1865	Public	32,710	Wildcats	2022		Men's soccer	Southeastern (SEC)
Mercer University	Macon, Georgia	1833	Nonsectarian	8,740	Bears	2022		Beach volleyball	Southern (SoCon)
University of North Carolina Wilmington (UNC Wilmington, UNCW)	Wilmington, North Carolina	1947	Public	14,765	Seahawks	2022		Beach volleyball	Coastal (CAA)
University of South Carolina	Columbia, South Carolina	1801	Public	35,364	Gamecocks	2022		Men's soccer	Southeastern (SEC)
West Virginia University	Morgantown, West Virginia	1867	Public	26,269	Mountaineers	2022		Men's soccer	Big 12

=== Former full members ===
Institution	Location	Founded	Type	Nickname	Joined (Note: Represents the calendar year when fall sports competition begins.)	Left (Note: Represents the calendar year when spring sports competition ends.)	Colors	Subsequent conference(s)	Current conference
University of Alabama at Birmingham (UAB)	Birmingham, Alabama	1969	Public	Blazers	1979	1991		Great Midwest (1991–95); Conf. USA (CUSA) (1995–2023)	American (2023–present)
University of Central Florida (UCF)	Orlando, Florida (Note: The main UCF campus has an Orlando mailing address but is in unincorporated Orange County.)	1963	Public	Knights	1991	1992		various (Note: Central Florida (UCF) had joined the following subsequent conferences: the Trans Atlantic Athletic Conference (TAAC; now the Atlantic Sun Conference [ASUN]) from 1992–93 to 2004–05; Conference USA (CUSA) from 2005–06 to 2012–13; and the American Athletic Conference (AAC or The American) from 2013–14 to 2022–23.)	Big 12 (2023–present)
University of Denver	Denver, Colorado	1864	Nonsectarian	Pioneers	1999	2012		Western (WAC) (2012–13); Summit (2013–26)	West Coast (WCC) (2026–present)
Florida Atlantic University (FAU)	Boca Raton, Florida	1961	Public	Owls	2006 (Note: Florida Atlantic (FAU) competed as an affiliate member for football during the 2005 fall season (2005–06 school year).)	2013		Conf. USA (CUSA) (2013–23)	American (2023–present)
Florida International University (FIU)	Miami, Florida (Note: The main FIU campus has a Miami mailing address but is in unincorporated Miami-Dade County.)	1965	Public	Panthers	1998	2013		Conf. USA (CUSA) (2013–present)	
Jacksonville University	Jacksonville, Florida	1934	Nonsectarian	Dolphins	1976	1998		Atlantic Sun (ASUN) (1998–present)	
Lamar University	Beaumont, Texas	1923	Public	Cardinals	1991	1998		Southland (SLC) (1998–2021); Western (WAC) (2021–22)	Southland (SLC) (2022–present)
University of Arkansas at Little Rock (Note: The university changed its athletic brand to Little Rock in 2015.) (UALR, Little Rock)	Little Rock, Arkansas	1927	Public	Trojans	1991	2022		Ohio Valley (OVC) (2022–26)	United (UAC) (2026–present)
Middle Tennessee State University	Murfreesboro, Tennessee	1911	Public	Blue Raiders	2000	2013		Conf. USA (CUSA) (2013–present)	
New Mexico State University	Las Cruces, New Mexico	1888	Public	Aggies	2000	2005 (Note: New Mexico State was a full member from 2000–01 to 2004–05; and later competed as an affiliate member for football from the 2014 to 2017 fall seasons (2014–15 to 2017–18 school years).)		Western (WAC) (2005–23)	Conf. USA (CUSA) (2023–present)
University of New Orleans (Note: Known since July 2026 as LSU New Orleans.)	New Orleans, Louisiana	1958	Public	Privateers	1976	1980		D-I Independent (1980–87); American South (1987–91)	Southland (SLC) (2013–present)
University of New Orleans	New Orleans, Louisiana	1958	Public	Privateers	1991	2010		D-I Independent (Note: New Orleans was transitioning from NCAA Division I to NCAA Division II and joined the Gulf South Conference (GSC) for some sports (excluding basketball) during the 2011–12 school year, only for the school to later announce its intentions to stay at NCAA Division I.) (2010–13)	Southland (SLC) (2013–present)
University of North Carolina at Charlotte (Note: The university did not officially change its athletic brand to Charlotte until 2000, after it had left the SBC.) (UNC Charlotte, Charlotte)	Charlotte, North Carolina	1946	Public	49ers	1976	1991		various (Note: North Carolina–Charlotte had joined the following subsequent conferences: the Metro Conference from 1991–92 to 1994–95; Conference USA (CUSA) from 1995–96 to 2004–05, and again from 2013–14 to 2022–23; and the Atlantic 10 Conference (A10) from 2005–06 to 2012–13.)	American (2023–present)
University of North Texas (UNT)	Denton, Texas	1890	Public	Mean Green	2000	2013		Conf. USA (CUSA) (2013–23)	American (2023–present)
University of South Florida (USF)	Tampa, Florida	1956	Public	Bulls	1976	1991		various (Note: South Florida (USF) had joined the following subsequent conferences: the Metro Conference from 1991–92 to 1994–95; Conference USA (CUSA) from 1995–96 to 2004–05; and the original Big East Conference from 2005–06 to 2012–13.)	American (2013–present)
University of Texas at Arlington (UT Arlington, UTA)	Arlington, Texas	1895	Public	Mavericks	2013	2022		United (UAC) (Note: UT Arlington joined the Western Athletic Conference (WAC) for the 2022–23 school year. The conference rebranded as the United Athletic Conference (UAC) on July 1, 2026.) (2022–present)	
University of Texas–Pan American (Note: Texas–Pan American (UTPA) was merged into the University of Texas Rio Grande Valley (UTRGV) in 2015; the merged school inherited UTPA's athletic program, with the new nickname of Vaqueros, and membership in the Western Athletic Conference (WAC).) (UTPA)	Edinburg, Texas	1927	Public	Broncs	1991	1998		various (Note: Texas–Pan American (UTPA; now Texas–Rio Grande Valley [UTRGV] since 2015) had joined the following subsequent conferences: as an NCAA D-I Independent from 1998–99 to 2008–09; the Great West Conference from 2009–10 to 2012–13; and the Western Athletic Conference (WAC) from 2013–14 to 2023–24.)	Southland (SLC) (Note: Texas–Rio Grande Valley (UTRGV) joined the Southland as the UTRGV Vaqueros in 2024.) (2024–present)
Texas State University	San Marcos, Texas	1899	Public	Bobcats	2013	2026		Pac-12 (2026–present)	
Virginia Commonwealth University (VCU)	Richmond, Virginia	1838	Public	Rams	1979	1991		Metro (1991–95); Colonial (CAA) (1995–2012)	Atlantic 10 (A10) (2012–present)
Western Kentucky University (WKU)	Bowling Green, Kentucky	1906	Public	Hilltoppers & Lady Toppers	1982	2014		Conf. USA (CUSA) (2014–present)	

=== Former affiliate members ===
Institution	Location	Founded	Type	Nickname	Joined (Note: Represents the calendar year when fall sports competition begins.)	Left (Note: Represents the calendar year when spring sports competition ends.)	Colors	SBC sport(s)	Primary conference	Conference in former SBC sport(s)
Alabama A&M University (Note: Also known as Alabama Agricultural and Mechanical University.)	Huntsville, Alabama	1875	Public	Bulldogs	1996	1997		Men's soccer	Southwestern (SWAC)	N/A (Note: Alabama A&M eventually dropped men's soccer after the 2011 fall season (2012–12 school year).)
University of Central Arkansas	Conway, Arkansas	1907	Public	Bears (Note: Central Arkansas uses "Bears" only for men's teams, with women's teams known as "Sugar Bears". Men's soccer was the school's only Sun Belt sport.)	2019	2021		Men's soccer	Atlantic Sun (ASUN)	
Hartwick College	Oneonta, New York	1797	Nonsectarian	Hawks	2014	2018		Men's soccer	Empire 8 (E8) (Note: Currently an NCAA Division III athletic conference.)	
Howard University	Washington, D.C.	1867	Nonsectarian	Bison	2014	2021 (Note: Due to COVID-19 concerns, Howard chose not to play soccer in the 2020–21 school year, although the Sun Belt chose to hold a men's soccer season, with the four remaining men's soccer members playing a fall conference schedule and spring non-conference games to accommodate the NCAA's move of the Division I tournament from fall 2020 to spring 2021.)		Men's soccer	Mid-Eastern (MEAC)	Northeast (NEC)
University of Idaho	Moscow, Idaho	1889	Public	Vandals	2001	2005		Football	Big Sky (BSC)	
University of Idaho	Moscow, Idaho	1889	Public	Vandals	2014	2018		Football	Big Sky (BSC)	
New Jersey Institute of Technology (NJIT)	Newark, New Jersey	1881	Public	Highlanders	2014	2016		Men's soccer	America East (AmEast)	
New Mexico State University	Las Cruces, New Mexico	1888	Public	Aggies	2014	2018		Football	Conf. USA (CUSA)	
University of North Texas (UNT)	Denton, Texas	1890	Public	Mean Green	1993	1994		Men's soccer	American	N/A (Note: North Texas dropped men's soccer after the 1993 fall season (1993–94 school year).)
Stephen F. Austin State University	Nacogdoches, Texas	1923	Public	Ladyjacks	2022	2024		Beach volleyball	Southland (SLC)	
Utah State University	Logan, Utah	1888	Public	Aggies	2003	2005		Football	Pac-12	
Vanderbilt University	Nashville, Tennessee	1873	Nonsectarian	Commodores	1995	1997		Men's soccer	Southeastern (SEC)	N/A (Note: Vanderbilt dropped men's soccer after the 2005 fall season (2005–06 school year).)

=== Membership timeline ===
Full members (all sports) Full members (non-football) Associate members (football-only) Associate members (other) Other conference 1 Other conference 2

== Commissioners ==
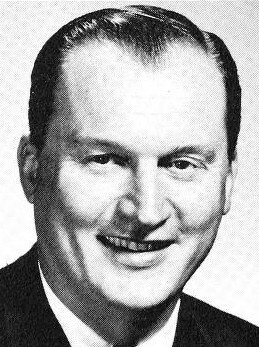
Vic Bubas was the Sun Belt Conference's first commissioner, successfully creating what was initially a premier mid-major basketball league.

- Vic Bubas (1976–1990)
- Jim Lessig (1990–1991)
- Craig Thompson (1991–1998)
- Wright Waters (1999–2012)
- Karl Benson (2012–2019)
- Keith Gill (2019–present)

In addition to the five Sun Belt commissioners, three future league leaders served on the Sun Belt staff prior to becoming conference commissioners, including Doug Elgin (Missouri Valley), John Iamarino (Northeast, Southern), and Tom Burnett (Southland).

On October 12, 2011, ESPN reported that Wright Waters would retire, effective July 1, 2012. On February 15, 2012, Karl Benson was hired as the new commissioner of the Sun Belt, after having been the commissioner of the Western Athletic Conference for 17 years. Waters would later move his departure date to March 15, allowing Benson to take over at that time.

Keith Gill was named the commissioner of the Sun Belt Conference on March 18, 2019. He is the first African American to lead any FBS conference.

== Sports ==
As of the current 2025–26 school year, the Sun Belt Conference sponsors championship competition in nine men's and ten women's NCAA sanctioned sports. The most recent change to sports sponsorship was the reinstatement of women's swimming and diving in 2023–24.

When Marshall was formally introduced as an incoming Sun Belt member, SBC commissioner Keith Gill also announced that the conference would reinstate men's soccer once all new members joined. Men's soccer resumed play in 2022–23 with six full members joined by three associates; a fourth associate joined in 2023–24. Beach volleyball started play with eight members, evenly divided between full members and associates.

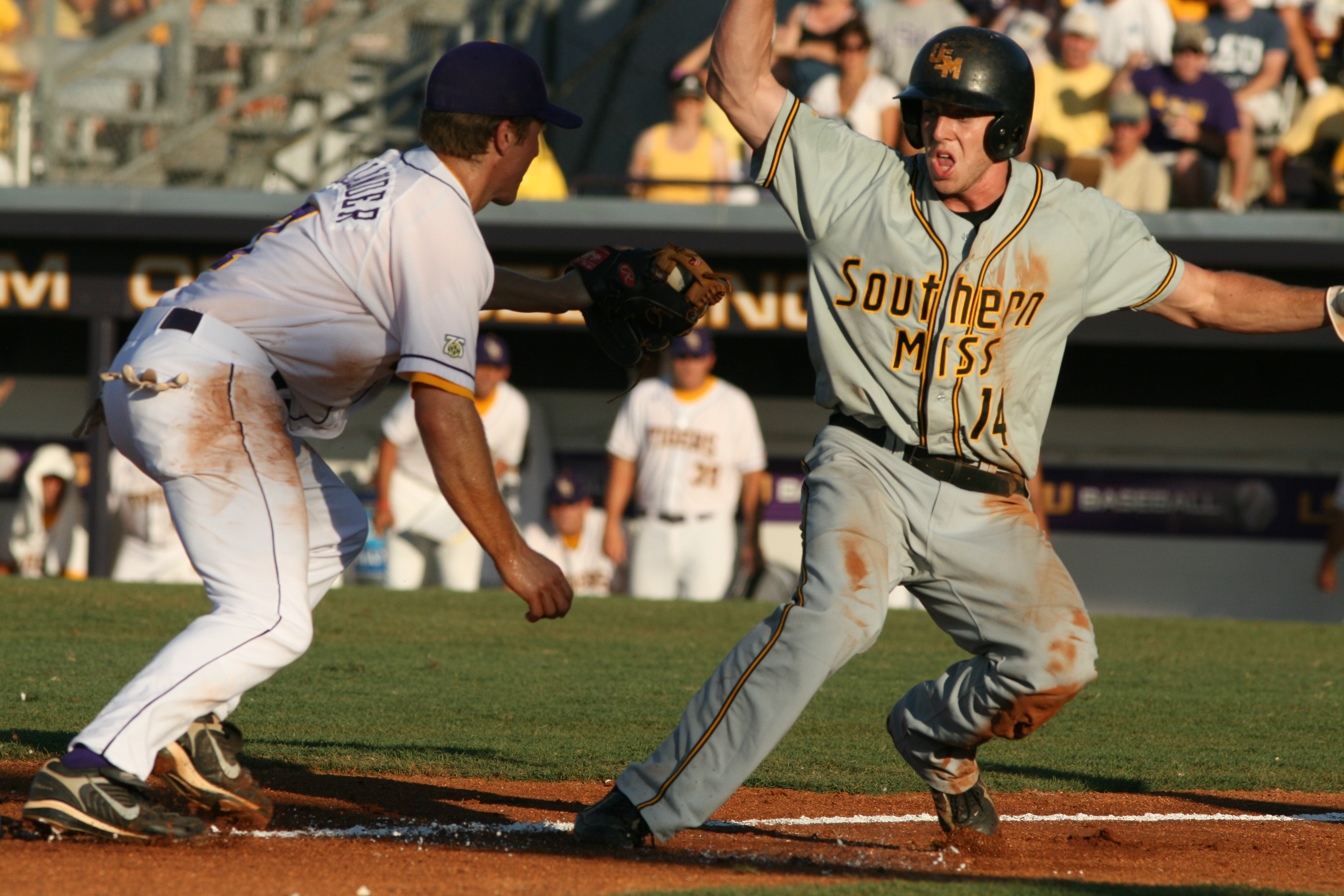
Southern Miss vs. LSU baseball in 2008

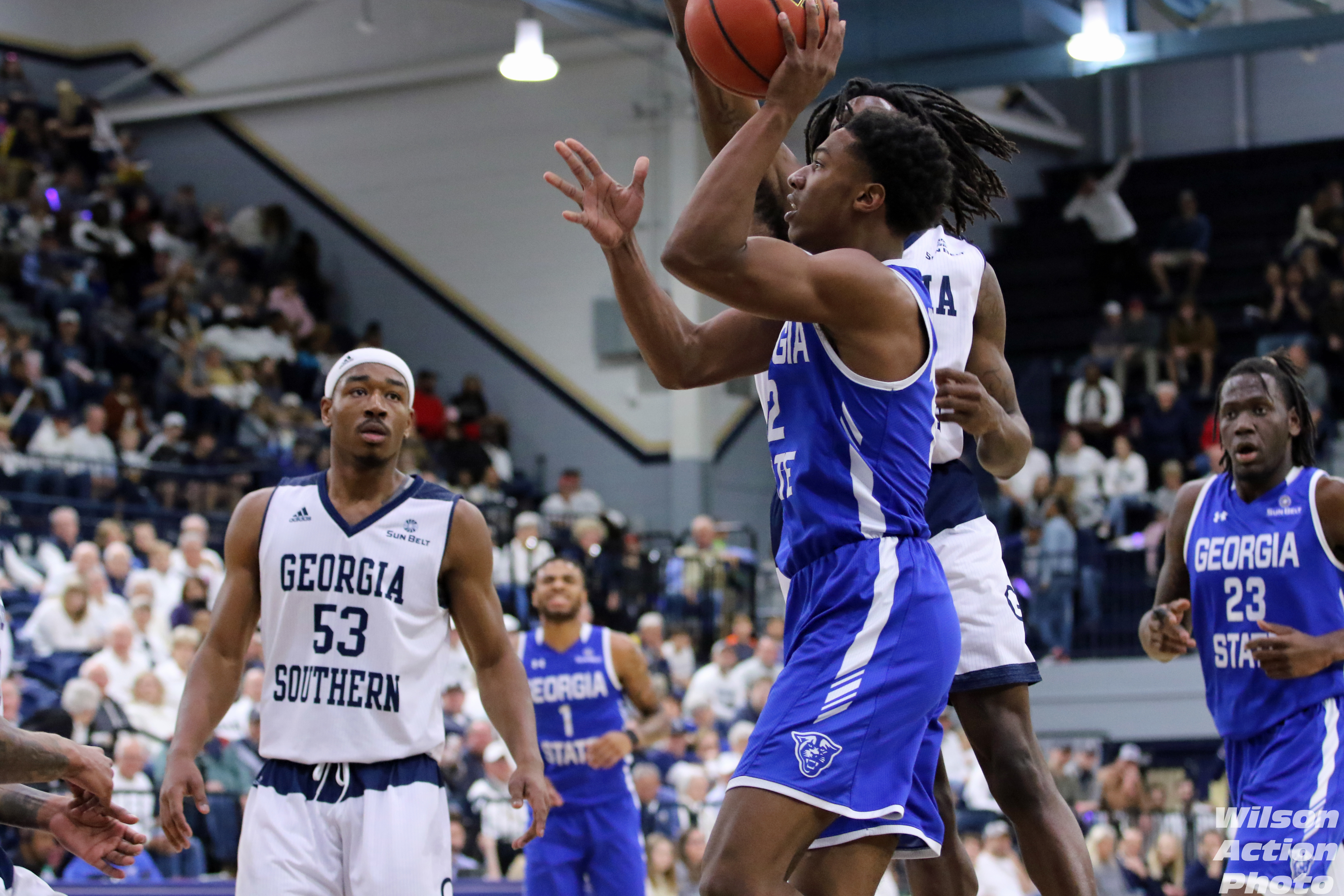
Georgia Southern vs. Georgia State men's basketball in 2020

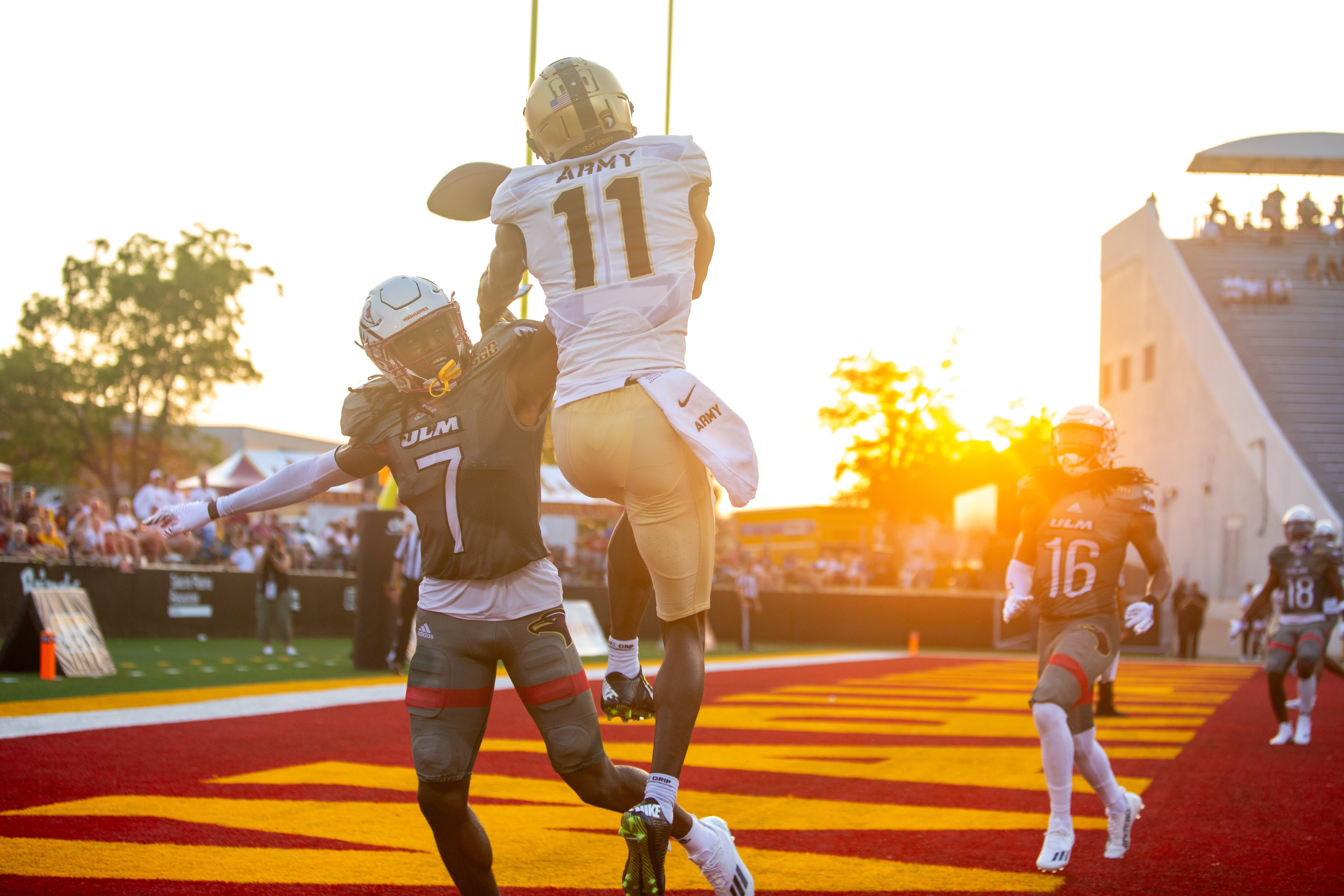
Louisiana–Monroe vs. Army football in 2023

Teams in Sun Belt competition (Note: Numbers of teams are as of the 2023–24 school year.)
Sport	Men's	Women's
Baseball	14	–
Basketball	14	14
Beach volleyball	–	8
Cross country	9	13
Football	14	–
Golf	14	12
Soccer	10	14
Softball	–	12
Tennis	9	14
Track and field indoor	7	13
Track and field outdoor	10	13
Volleyball	–	14

=== Men's sponsored sports by school ===
Member-by-member sponsorship of the nine men's SBC sports for the 2026–27 academic year.

School	Baseball	Basketball	Cross country	Football	Golf	Soccer	Tennis	Track & field Indoor	Track & field outdoor	Total sports
Appalachian State	Yes	Yes	Yes	Yes	Yes	No	No	No	Yes	6
Arkansas State	Yes	Yes	Yes	Yes	Yes	No	No	Yes	Yes	7
Coastal Carolina	Yes	Yes	Yes	Yes	Yes	Yes	Yes	No	Yes	8
Georgia Southern	Yes	Yes	No	Yes	Yes	Yes	Yes	No	No	6
Georgia State	Yes	Yes	No	Yes	Yes	Yes	Yes	No	No	6
James Madison	Yes	Yes	No	Yes	Yes	Yes	Yes	No	No	6
Louisiana	Yes	Yes	Yes	Yes	Yes	No	Yes	Yes	Yes	8
Louisiana–Monroe	Yes	Yes	Yes	Yes	Yes	No	No	Yes	Yes	7
Louisiana Tech	Yes	Yes	Yes	Yes	Yes	No	No	Yes	Yes	7
Marshall	Yes	Yes	Yes	Yes	Yes	Yes	No	Yes	Yes	8
Old Dominion	Yes	Yes	No	Yes	Yes	Yes	Yes	No	No	6
South Alabama	Yes	Yes	Yes	Yes	Yes	No	Yes	Yes	Yes	8
Southern Miss	Yes	Yes	No	Yes	Yes	No	Yes	Yes	Yes	7
Troy	Yes	Yes	Yes	Yes	Yes	No	Yes	No	Yes	7
Totals	14	14	9	14	14	6+4	9	7	10	97+4
Affiliate members
Kentucky						Yes				1
South Carolina						Yes				1
UCF						Yes				1
West Virginia						Yes				1

==== Men's varsity sports not sponsored by the Sun Belt ====
School	Sailing (Note: Sailing is a coeducational sport not governed by the NCAA, but instead by the Inter-Collegiate Sailing Association.)	Swimming & diving	Wrestling
Appalachian State			SoCon
Old Dominion	MAISA	ASUN	

=== Women's sponsored sports by school ===
Member-by-member sponsorship of the 10 women's SBC sports for the 2026–27 academic year.

School	Basketball	Beach volleyball	Cross country	Golf	Soccer	Softball	Tennis	Track & field indoor	Track & field outdoor	Volleyball	Total sports
Appalachian State	Yes	No	Yes	Yes	Yes	Yes	Yes	Yes	Yes	Yes	9
Arkansas State	Yes	No	Yes	Yes	Yes	No	Yes	Yes	Yes	Yes	8
Coastal Carolina	Yes	Yes	Yes	Yes	Yes	Yes	Yes	Yes	Yes	Yes	10
Georgia Southern	Yes	No	Yes	Yes	Yes	Yes	Yes	Yes	Yes	Yes	9
Georgia State	Yes	Yes	Yes	Yes	Yes	Yes	Yes	Yes	Yes	Yes	10
James Madison	Yes	No	Yes	Yes	Yes	Yes	Yes	Yes	Yes	Yes	9
Louisiana	Yes	No	Yes	No	Yes	Yes	Yes	Yes	Yes	Yes	8
Louisiana–Monroe	Yes	Yes	Yes	Yes	Yes	Yes	No	Yes	Yes	Yes	9
Louisiana Tech	Yes	No	Yes	No	Yes	Yes	Yes	Yes	Yes	Yes	8
Marshall	Yes	No	Yes	Yes	Yes	Yes	Yes	Yes	Yes	Yes	9
Old Dominion	Yes	No	No	Yes	Yes	No	Yes	No	No	Yes	5
South Alabama	Yes	No	Yes	Yes	Yes	Yes	Yes	Yes	Yes	Yes	9
Southern Miss	Yes	Yes	Yes	Yes	Yes	Yes	Yes	Yes	Yes	Yes	10
Troy	Yes	No	Yes	Yes	Yes	Yes	Yes	Yes	Yes	Yes	9
Totals	14	4+3	13	12	14	12	13	13	13	14	123+3
Affiliate members
Charleston		Yes									1
Mercer		Yes									1
UNCW		Yes									1

==== Women's varsity sports not sponsored by the Sun Belt ====
School	Bowling	Field hockey	Lacrosse	Rifle	Rowing	Sailing (Note: Sailing is a coeducational sport not governed by the NCAA, but instead by the Inter-Collegiate Sailing Association.)	Swimming & diving
Appalachian State		MAC					
Arkansas State	CUSA						
Coastal Carolina			ASUN				
Georgia Southern				SoCon			ASUN
James Madison		MAC	American				American
Louisiana Tech	IND						
Marshall							American
Old Dominion		Big East	American		Big 12	MAISA	ASUN

== Rivalries ==
The Sun Belt is known for regional football rivalries, many of which predate the conference’s first football season in 2001. Unlike most FBS leagues, the Sun Belt still splits football into East and West divisions, so several of its best-known series are played every year as intra-division games.

One of the longest-running in-state series is the Battle on the Bayou between Louisiana and ULM, which dates to 1951. The longest-running in-state series is now the Louisiana–Louisiana Tech football rivalry between Louisiana and Louisiana Tech, which dates to 1910 and has been played 87 times. The in-state Alabama series between South Alabama and Troy is known as the Battle for the Belt. In Georgia, Georgia Southern and Georgia State play Modern Day Hate. In the Appalachians, Appalachian State and Georgia Southern play Deeper Than Hate, while Appalachian State and Marshall play The Old Mountain Feud. In Virginia, James Madison and Old Dominion play the Royal Rivalry as part of an all-sports series.

Louisiana Tech rejoined the Sun Belt in 2026, restoring in-state meetings with Louisiana and ULM and reviving the I-20 Showdown and the Rivalry in Dixie with Southern Miss.

=== Football rivalries ===
Football rivalries involving Sun Belt teams include:

Teams		Rivalry Name	Trophy	Meetings (last)	Record	Series Leader
Appalachian State	Georgia Southern	Deeper Than Hate	—	41 (2025)	21–19–1	Appalachian State
Appalachian State	Marshall	Old Mountain Feud	—	28 (2025)	17–11	Appalachian State
Appalachian State	Coastal Carolina	Appalachian State–Coastal Carolina	—	12 (2025)	7–5	Appalachian State
Georgia State	Georgia Southern	Modern Day Hate	—	12 (2025)	6–6	Georgia State
James Madison	Old Dominion	Royal Rivalry	Crown	6 (2025)	4–2	James Madison
Louisiana	Louisiana–Monroe	Battle on the Bayou	Wooden Boot	61 (Note: In 2015, Louisiana vacated their win over Louisiana–Monroe in their 2011 football season due to alleged major NCAA violations.) (2025)	34–26	Louisiana
Louisiana	Louisiana Tech	Louisiana–Louisiana Tech football rivalry	—	87 (2015)	48–33–6	Louisiana Tech
Louisiana Tech	Louisiana–Monroe	I-20 Showdown	—	43 (2000)	29–14	Louisiana Tech
Louisiana Tech	Southern Miss	Rivalry in Dixie	—	55 (2025)	36–18	Southern Miss
South Alabama	Troy	Battle for the Belt	Belt	14 (2025)	10–4	Troy

Notes

^{†} Meeting totals and series records as of the latest published sources; update after each season.

== Championships ==
"RS" is regular season, "T" is tournament. Championships from the previous academic year are flagged with the calendar year in which the most recent season or tournament ended.

=== Current Sun Belt champions ===
Fall 2025

Sport	School
Cross; Country	Appalachian State (men); Appalachian State (women)
Football	James Madison (East RS, CG); Troy (West RS)
Soccer (M)	Kentucky (RS); UCF (T)
Soccer (W)	Old Dominion (East RS); ULM (West RS); Texas State (T)
Volleyball (W)	James Madison (East RS); Arkansas State & South Alabama (West RS); Arkansas State (T)

Winter 2025–26

Sport	School
Basketball (M)	Troy (RS & T)
Basketball (W)	Georgia Southern (RS); James Madison (T)
Track & Field; Indoor	Texas State (men); Texas State (women)

Spring 2026

Sport	School
Baseball	Southern Miss (RS & T)
Beach; Volleyball	Coastal Carolina (RS); Georgia State (T)
Golf	Arkansas State (men); ULM (women)
Softball	ULM (RS); South Alabama (T)
Tennis (M)	Old Dominion (T) (Note: The SBC does not award a regular-season championship in men's or women's tennis because teams do not schedule the same number of conference matchups.)
Tennis (W)	Old Dominion (T)
Track & Field; Outdoor	Texas State (men); Texas State (women)

==== Vic Bubas Cup ====
The Sun Belt also has an all-sports competition called the Vic Bubas Cup, which is awarded to the school with the best performance across every sport the Sun Belt Conference sponsors. South Alabama has won the most Bubas Cups, with 16.

=== NCAA champions ===
The only school to have won a national title while an SBC member is Old Dominion, which won one title in women's basketball and five in the non-SBC sport of field hockey during its first conference tenure from 1982 to 1991. Six other current members have won NCAA Division I team championships prior to joining the conference. Coastal Carolina won its only D-I national title on the day before it officially joined the SBC, while representing the Big South Conference.

School	NCAA titles	Sport	Years
Old Dominion	10	Women's basketball	1985
Old Dominion	10	Field hockey	1982 • 1983 • 1984 • 1988 • 1990 • 1991 • 1992 • 1998 • 2000
Georgia Southern	6	Football (Division I-AA/FCS)	1985 • 1986 • 1989 • 1990 • 1999 • 2000
James Madison	5	Field hockey	1994
James Madison	5	Archery	1995
James Madison	5	Football (Division I-AA/FCS)	2004 • 2016
James Madison	5	Women's lacrosse	2018
Appalachian State	3	Football (Division I-AA/FCS)	2005 • 2006 • 2007
Marshall	3	Football (Division I-AA/FCS)	1992 • 1996
Marshall	3	Men's soccer	2020
Louisiana Tech	2	Women's basketball	1982 • 1988
Louisiana–Monroe	1	Football (Division I-AA/FCS)	1987
Coastal Carolina	1	Baseball	2016
Total	29		

See also: List of NCAA schools with the most NCAA Division I championships, List of NCAA schools with the most Division I national championships, and NCAA Division I FBS Conferences

== Football ==
For more information see Sun Belt Conference football. For the current season, see 2026 Sun Belt Conference football season.

West Division	East Division
Arkansas State	Appalachian State
Louisiana	Coastal Carolina
Louisiana–Monroe	Georgia Southern
Louisiana Tech	Georgia State
South Alabama	James Madison
Southern Miss	Marshall
Troy	Old Dominion

Sun Belt Conference football members
— East Division
— West Division

The Sun Belt first began sponsoring football in 2001. It originally consisted of seven football playing schools, three of which are still members of the conference. Up until 2009, the conference only had a contract with one bowl, the New Orleans Bowl. Following the Sun Belt's improved football success and geographical membership changes, other bowls began to sign contracts with the Sun Belt Conference. As of October 2021, the conference had seven bowl game tie-ins (Cure, Boca Raton, LendingTree, New Orleans, Myrtle Beach, Frisco, and Camellia)

Throughout the years, the conference has experienced flux in membership changes, similar to many other FBS conferences. The conference announced that beginning in 2018, the conference (10 teams after the departure of Idaho and New Mexico State) would be divided into two divisions for football: East: Appalachian State, Coastal Carolina, Georgia Southern, Georgia State, and Troy; West: Arkansas State, Louisiana, Louisiana–Monroe, South Alabama, and Texas State. The divisional alignments changed again with the 2022 expansion, with the new dividing line being the Alabama–Georgia border. The winner of each division will meet in the Sun Belt Championship game.

Team	First season	All-Time record	All-Time win %	Bowl appearances	Bowl record	All-Time Conference titles	Current Head Coach
Appalachian State	1928	668–363–28	.644	8	7–1	22	Shawn Clark
Arkansas State	1911	503–530–37	.487	12	5–7	14	Butch Jones
Coastal Carolina	2003	172–96	.642	5	2–3	9	Tim Beck
Georgia Southern	1924	426–258–10	.621	7	3–4	11	Clay Helton
Georgia State	2010	64–115	.358	6	4–2	0	Dell McGee
James Madison	1972	378–228-4	.623	2	1–1	10	Bob Chesney
Louisiana	1901	582–568–34	.506	12	8–4	13	Michael Desormeaux
Louisiana–Monroe	1931	330–471–8	.413	1	0–1	5	Bryant Vincent
Louisiana Tech	1901	654–508–37	.561	15	9–5–1	25	Sonny Cumbie
Marshall	1895	638–574–47	.525	20	13–7	13	Tony Gibson
Old Dominion	2009 (Note: The team played as a division of the College of William & Mary from 1930 to 1940, then folded. It was restarted in 2009; 17 years ago.)	97–86–0	.530	3	1–2	0	Ricky Rahne
Southern Miss	1912	618–473–27	.565	25	12–13	8	Charles Huff
South Alabama	2009	90–98	.479	5	2–3	0	Major Applewhite
Troy	1909	581–437–28	.569	10	6–4	21	Gerard Parker

=== Sun Belt champions ===
Since the 2018 NCAA Division I FBS season, the Sun Belt Conference has held a football championship game.

Season	Champion	Conference record
2001	Middle Tennessee; North Texas	5–1
2002	North Texas	6–0
2003	North Texas	7–0
2004	North Texas	7–0
2005	Arkansas State; Louisiana–Lafayette; Louisiana–Monroe	5–2
2006	Middle Tennessee; Troy	6–1
2007	Florida Atlantic; Troy	6–1
2008	Troy	6–1
2009	Troy	8–0
2010	Florida International; Troy	6–2
2011	Arkansas State	8–0
2012	Arkansas State	7–1
2013*	Arkansas State	5–2
2014	Georgia Southern	8–0
2015	Arkansas State	8–0
2016	Appalachian State; Arkansas State	7–1
2017	Appalachian State; Troy	7–1
2018	Appalachian State	7–1
2019	Appalachian State	7–1
2020*	Coastal Carolina; Louisiana	8–0; 7–1
2021	Louisiana	8–0
2022	Troy	7–1
2023	Troy	7–1
2024	Marshall	7–1
2025	James Madison	8–0

Notes

- Louisiana–Lafayette vacated 2013 shared Sun Belt Conference co-championship due to major NCAA violations.
- The 2020 championship game was canceled due to COVID-19 issues; the divisional champions were declared league co-champions.

=== Bowl games ===
As of the 2024–25 NCAA football bowl games, the Sun Belt Conference had tie-ins with the following bowl games:

Name	Location	Opposing conference
68 Ventures Bowl	Mobile, Alabama	MAC
Cure Bowl	Orlando, Florida	The American
Myrtle Beach Bowl	Conway, South Carolina	CUSA/MAC
New Orleans Bowl	New Orleans, Louisiana	CUSA
Salute to Veterans Bowl	Montgomery, Alabama	MAC

== Basketball ==
=== Men's basketball ===
This list goes through the 2021–22 season.

Team	First season	All-time record	All-time win %	NCAA Tournament appearances	NCAA Tournament record	Arena	Head coach
Appalachian State	1919–20	1263–1162	.521	3	0–3	Holmes Center	Dustin Kerns
Arkansas State	1926–27	1183–1184	.500	1	0–1	First National Bank Arena	Bryan Hodgson
Coastal Carolina	1974–75	711–680	.511	4	0–4	HTC Center	Justin Gray
Georgia Southern	1926–27	1289–1014	.560	3	0–3	Hill Convocation Center	Brian Burg
Georgia State	1963–64	668–954	.412	6	2–6	Georgia State Convocation Center	Jonas Hayes
James Madison	1969–70	787–714	.524	6	5–6	Atlantic Union Bank Center	Preston Spradlin
Louisiana	1911–12	1449–1124	.563	11	4–11	Cajundome	Bob Marlin
Louisiana–Monroe	1951–52	1014–937	.520	7	0–7	Fant–Ewing Coliseum	Keith Richard
Louisiana Tech	1909–10	1494–1096	.577	5	4–5	Thomas Assembly Center	Talvin Hester
Marshall	1906–07	1539–1139–2	.575	6	1–6	Cam Henderson Center	Cornelius Jackson
Old Dominion	1950–51	1214–765	.613	12	3–12	Chartway Arena	Mike Jones
South Alabama	1968–69	857–682	.557	8	1–8	Mitchell Center	Richie Riley
Southern Miss	1912–13	1279–1112–1	.535	3	0–3	Reed Green Coliseum	Jay Ladner
Troy	1950–51	1086–933	.538	2	0–2	Trojan Arena	Scott Cross

=== Women's basketball ===
This list goes through the 2022–23 season.

Team	First season	All-time record	All-time win %	NCAA Tournament appearances	NCAA Tournament record	Arena	Head coach
Appalachian State	1970–71	689–726	.487	4	0–4	Holmes Center	Alaura Sharp
Arkansas State	1974–75	770–602	.561	0	0–0	First National Bank Arena	Destinee Rogers
Coastal Carolina	1974–75	572–732	.439	0	0–0	HTC Center	Kevin Pederson
Georgia Southern	1973–74	707–679	.510	2	0–2	Hill Convocation Center	Hanna Haden
Georgia State	1975–76	630–692	.477	3	0–3	Georgia State Convocation Center	Gene Hill
James Madison	1920–21	1176–578–5	.670	12	8–12	Atlantic Union Bank Center	Sean O'Regan
Louisiana	1982–83	466–684	.405	1	0–1	Cajundome	Gary Broadhead
Louisiana–Monroe	1974–75	632–682	.481	4	4–4	Fant–Ewing Coliseum	Missy Bilerback
Louisiana Tech	1974–75	1251–429	.745	27	66–25	Thomas Assembly Center	Brooke Stoehr
Marshall	1969–70	715–737	.492	2	0–2	Cam Henderson Center	Juli Fulks
Old Dominion	1969–70	1121–480	.700	25	34–24	Chartway Arena	DeLisha Milton-Jones
South Alabama	1974–75	666–701	.487	1	0–1	Mitchell Center	Yolisha Jackson
Southern Miss	1975–76	780–589	.570	8	4–8	Reed Green Coliseum	Joye Lee-McNelis
Troy	1975–76	670–677	.497	4	0–4	Trojan Arena	Chanda Rigby

=== Championships ===
Since the 2022–23 season, the Sun Belt Conference men's and women's basketball tournaments, held in early March, have involved all 14 of the conference's teams, and have been bracketed in a semi-stepladder format. The bottom four seeds play in the first round; seed 5 through 10 receive byes to the second round, and the top 4 seeds to the quarterfinals. All rounds are held in Pensacola, Florida at Pensacola Bay Center since 2022. Winners of the tournaments earn automatic bids to their respective NCAA Division I basketball tournament.

Season	Men's Regular Season Champion	Men's Tournament Champion	Women's Regular Season Champion	Women's Tournament Champion
1977	North Carolina–Charlotte		No Regular Season	No Tournament
1978	North Carolina–Charlotte	New Orleans	No Regular Season	No Tournament
1979	South Alabama	Jacksonville	No Regular Season	No Tournament
1980	South Alabama	Virginia Commonwealth	No Regular Season	No Tournament
1981	Virginia Commonwealth		No Regular Season	No Tournament
1982	Alabama–Birmingham		No Regular Season	No Tournament
1983	Virginia Commonwealth	Alabama–Birmingham	Old Dominion	
1984	Virginia Commonwealth	Alabama–Birmingham	Old Dominion	
1985	Virginia Commonwealth		Old Dominion	
1986	Old Dominion	Jacksonville	Western Kentucky	
1987	Western Kentucky	Alabama–Birmingham	Old Dominion	
1988	North Carolina–Charlotte		Old Dominion	Western Kentucky
1989	South Alabama		Old Dominion	Western Kentucky
1990	Alabama–Birmingham	South Florida	Alabama–Birmingham	Old Dominion
1991	South Alabama		Alabama–Birmingham	Western Kentucky
1992	Southwestern Louisiana		Western Kentucky	
1993	New Orleans	Western Kentucky	Western Kentucky	
1994	Western Kentucky	Southwestern Louisiana	Louisiana Tech	
1995	Western Kentucky		Louisiana Tech	Western Kentucky
1996	Arkansas–Little Rock	New Orleans	Louisiana Tech	
1997	South Alabama		Louisiana Tech	
1998	South Alabama		Louisiana Tech	
1999	Louisiana Tech	Arkansas State	Louisiana Tech	
2000	Louisiana–Lafayette		Louisiana Tech	
2001	Western Kentucky		Louisiana Tech	
2002	Western Kentucky		Florida International	
2003	Western Kentucky		Western Kentucky	
2004	Louisiana–Lafayette (vacated)		South Alabama	Middle Tennessee State
2005	Denver	Louisiana–Lafayette (vacated)	Western Kentucky	Middle Tennessee State
2006	Western Kentucky	South Alabama	Western Kentucky	Middle Tennessee
2007	South Alabama	North Texas	Middle Tennessee	
2008	South Alabama	Western Kentucky	Western Kentucky	
2009	Western Kentucky		Middle Tennessee	
2010	Troy	North Texas	Arkansas–Little Rock	Middle Tennessee
2011	Florida Atlantic	Arkansas–Little Rock	Middle Tennessee; Arkansas–Little Rock	Arkansas–Little Rock
2012	Middle Tennessee	Western Kentucky	Middle Tennessee	Arkansas–Little Rock
2013	Middle Tennessee	Western Kentucky	Middle Tennessee	Arkansas–Little Rock
2014	Georgia State	Louisiana–Lafayette	Arkansas State	Western Kentucky
2015	Georgia State		Arkansas–Little Rock	
2016	Little Rock		Arkansas State	Troy
2017	UT Arlington	Troy	Little Rock	Troy
2018	Louisiana	Georgia State	Little Rock	
2019	Georgia State		Little Rock; UT Arlington	Little Rock
2020	Little Rock	Tournament canceled	Troy	Tournament canceled
2021	Texas State	Appalachian State	Louisiana	Troy
2022	Texas State	Georgia State	Troy	UT Arlington
2023	Southern Miss	Louisiana	James Madison; Southern Miss; Texas State	James Madison
2024	Appalachian State	James Madison	Marshall	
2025	Troy; Arkansas State; South Alabama; James Madison	Troy	James Madison	Arkansas State

== Baseball ==
The Sun Belt Conference has sponsored an annual baseball tournament to determine the conference winner since 1978. South Alabama has won the most championships, at 13.

- Teams in **bold** represent current conference members.

School	Tourney titles	Title Years
**South Alabama**	13	1980 • 1981 • 1983 • 1984 • 1987 • 1992 • 1996 • 1997 • 2000 • 2001 • 2005 • 2017 • 2021
**Louisiana**	5	1998 • 2014 • 2015 • 2016 • 2022
**Coastal Carolina**	3	2018 • 2019 • 2025
New Orleans	3	1978 • 1979 • 2007
South Florida	3	1982 • 1986 • 1990
FIU	2	1999 • 2010
Lamar	2	1993 • 1995
Middle Tennessee	2	2003 • 2009
**Southern Miss**	2	2023 • 2024
Western Kentucky	2	2004 • 2008
**Arkansas State**	1	1994
Florida Atlantic	1	2013
Jacksonville	1	1989
Little Rock	1	2011
New Mexico State	1	2002
**Old Dominion**	1	1985
**Troy**	1	2006
UAB	1	1991
**ULM**	1	2012
VCU	1	1988

== Facilities ==
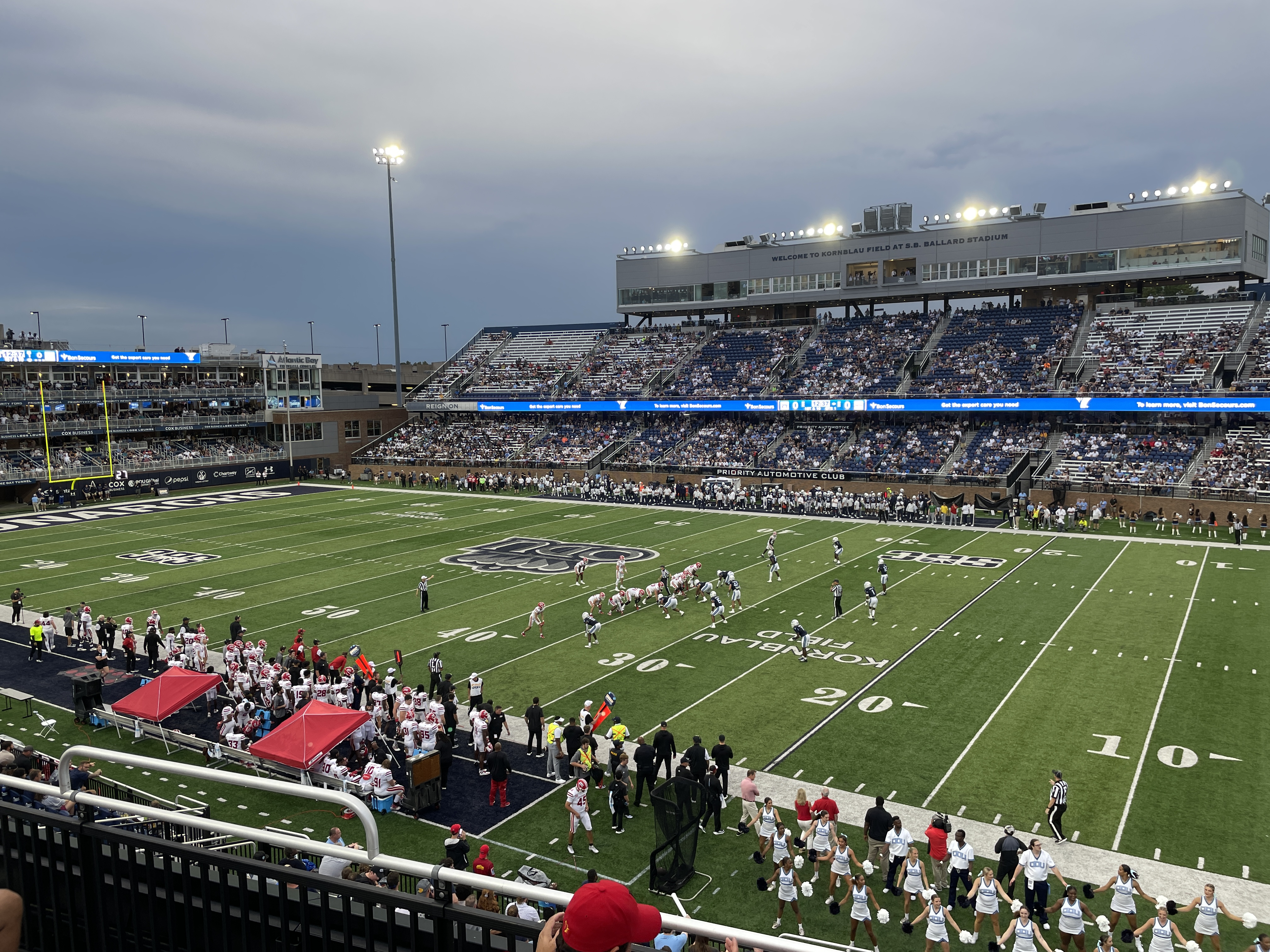
S.B. Ballard Stadium, on the campus of Old Dominion University.

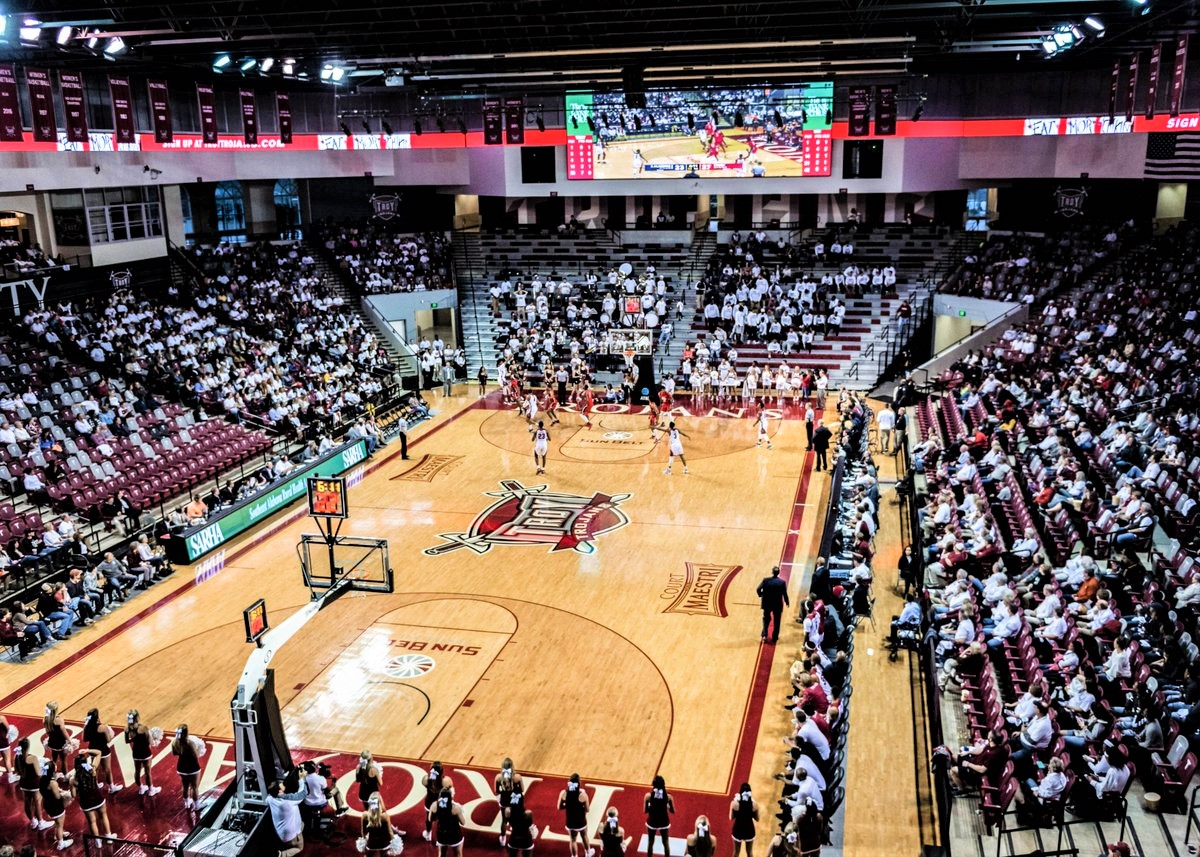
Trojan Arena, on the campus of Troy University.

School	Football stadium	Capacity	Basketball arena	Capacity	Baseball stadium	Capacity	Softball stadium	Capacity
Appalachian State	Kidd Brewer Stadium	30,000	Holmes Center	8,325	Jim and Bettie Smith Stadium	1,000	Sywassink/Lloyd Family Stadium	1,000
Arkansas State	Centennial Bank Stadium	30,406	First National Bank Arena	10,563	Tomlinson Stadium-Kell Field	1,200	Non-softball school	
Coastal Carolina	Brooks Stadium	21,000	HTC Center	3,370	Springs Brooks Stadium	5,400	St. John Stadium - Charles Wade-John Lott Field	500
Georgia Southern	Paulson Stadium	25,000	Hill Convocation Center	5,500	J. I. Clements Stadium	3,000	Eagle Field	400
Georgia State	Center Parc Stadium	24,333	GSU Convocation Center	8,000	GSU Baseball Complex	1,092	Robert E. Heck Softball Complex	500
James Madison	Bridgeforth Stadium	24,877	Atlantic Union Bank Center	8,500	Eagle Field at Veterans Memorial Park	1,200	Veterans Memorial Park	1,500
Louisiana-Lafayette	Our Lady of Lourdes Stadium	30,392	Cajundome (Note: Louisiana's women's basketball team primarily plays at the Cajundome but occasionally plays at Earl K. Long Gymnasium on the main campus.)	12,068	M. L. Tigue Moore Field	6,000	Yvette Girouard Field	2,790
Louisiana-Monroe	FMOL Health/St. Francis Stadium	27,617	Fant-Ewing Coliseum	7,085	Lou St. Amant Field	1,800	Geo-Surfaces Field	500
Louisiana Tech	Joe Aillet Stadium	28,562	Thomas Assembly Center	8,098	J. C. Love Field at Pat Patterson Park	2,500	Dr. Billy Bundrick Field	1,000
Marshall	Joan C. Edwards Stadium	30,475	Cam Henderson Center	9,048	Jack Cook Field	3,500	Dot Hicks Field	1,000
Old Dominion	S.B. Ballard Stadium	21,944	Chartway Arena	8,472	Bud Metheny Ballpark	2,500	Non-softball school	
South Alabama	Hancock Whitney Stadium	25,450	Mitchell Center	10,041	Eddie Stanky Field	4,500	Jaguar Field	1,050
Southern Miss	M. M. Roberts Stadium	36,000	Reed Green Coliseum	8,095	Pete Taylor Park	4,300	Southern Miss Softball Complex	607
Troy	Veterans Memorial Stadium	30,470	Trojan Arena	6,000	Riddle–Pace Field	2,500	Troy Softball Complex	800

== Financials ==
=== Conference distributions ===
The following table shows Sun Belt Conference distributions during the fiscal year beginning 07-01-2024 ending 06-30-2025 as reported by ProPublica using Schedule I of the Sun Belt Conference tax filing submitted on April 29, 2026.

Institution	2024–25 Distribution
James Madison University	$1,977,767
Appalachian State University	$1,717,642
Arkansas State University	$1,717,642
Coastal Carolina University	$1,717,642
Georgia Southern University	$1,717,642
Georgia State University	$1,717,642
Marshall University	$1,717,642
Old Dominion University	$1,717,642
Texas State University	$1,717,642
Troy University	$1,717,642
University of Louisiana at Lafayette	$1,717,642
University of Louisiana at Monroe	$1,717,642
University of South Alabama	$1,717,642
University of Southern Mississippi	$1,717,642
Average for 14 Members	$1,736,222

=== Athletic department revenue by school ===
Total revenue includes ticket sales, contributions and donations, rights and licensing, student fees, school funds and all other sources including TV income, camp income, concessions, and novelties.

Total expenses includes coach and staff salaries, scholarships, buildings and grounds, maintenance, utilities and rental fees, recruiting, team travel, equipment and uniforms, conference dues, and insurance.

The following table shows institutional reporting to the United States Department of Education as shown on the DOE Equity in Athletics website for the 2023–24 academic year.

Institution	2023–24 Total Revenue from Athletics	2023–24 Total Expenses on Athletics
James Madison University	$66,110,281	$66,110,281
Old Dominion University	$51,827,948	$51,827,948
Marshall University	$45,966,327	$45,966,327
Coastal Carolina University	$43,509,290	$43,509,290
Appalachian State University	$43,110,256	$43,110,256
University of Louisiana at Lafayette	$42,952,287	$42,952,287
Georgia State University	$39,204,432	$39,204,432
Georgia Southern University	$36,967,213	$36,967,213
Troy University	$36,937,664	$36,937,664
University of South Alabama	$30,591,632	$30,591,632
Louisiana Tech University	$30,305,928	$30,305,928
Arkansas State University	$28,162,528	$28,162,528
University of Southern Mississippi	$28,107,301	$28,107,301
University of Louisiana at Monroe	$20,253,458	$20,253,458

== Academics ==
Four of the Sun Belt's member schools, Georgia State, Louisiana, Old Dominion and Southern Miss are doctorate-granting universities with "very high research spending and doctorate production," the highest classification given by the Carnegie Foundation for the Advancement of Teaching.

Appalachian State is also currently ranked as one of the Top 10 regional schools in the South by the U.S. News & World Report.

University	Affiliation	Carnegie	Endowment (millions)	US News	Forbes
Appalachian State University	Public (UNC)	Research (High)	$99,593	6 (Regional: South)	301
Arkansas State University	Public (ASU System)	Research (High)	$66,217	317 (National)	N/A (Note: Not ranked in the 2022 Forbes America's Best Colleges rankings.)
Coastal Carolina University	Public	Master's (Larger)	$39,432	38 (Regional: South)	N/A
Georgia Southern University	Public (USG System)	Research (High)	$50,999	331-440 (National)	N/A
Georgia State University	Public (USG System)	Research (Very High)	$155,303	234 (National)	367
James Madison University	Public	Research (High)	$116,700	151 (National)	139
University of Louisiana at Lafayette	Public (UL System)	Research (Very High)	$178,300	331-440 (National)	N/A
University of Louisiana at Monroe	Public (UL System)	Doctoral/Research	$28,788	331-440 (National)	N/A
Louisiana Tech University	Public (UL System)	Research (High)	$55,956	318 (National)	470
Marshall University	Public	Research (High)	$192,000	299 (National)	N/A
Old Dominion University	Public	Research (Very High)	$265,800	299 (National)	472
University of South Alabama	Public	Research (High)	$555,735	331-440 (National)	N/A
University of Southern Mississippi	Public	Research (Very High)	$136,300	331-440 (National)	N/A
Troy University	Public (TU System)	Doctoral/Research	$191,458	44 (Regional: South)	N/A
