= 1984 NCAA Division I field hockey tournament =

Tournament details
- Host country: United States
- City: Springfield, Massachusetts
- Dates: November 10–18, 1984
- Teams: 12
- Venue: Stagg Field

Final positions
- Champions: Old Dominion (3rd title)
- Runner-up: Iowa

Tournament statistics
- Matches played: 11
- Goals scored: 55 (5 per match)

The 1984 NCAA Division I field hockey tournament was the fourth annual single-elimination tournament hosted by the National Collegiate Athletic Association to determine the national champion of women's collegiate field hockey among its Division I members in the United States, the culmination of the 1984 NCAA Division I field hockey season.

Old Dominion won their third consecutive championship, defeating Iowa in the final, 5–1.

The championship rounds were held at Stagg Field at Springfield College in Springfield, Massachusetts.

== Qualifying ==
Team	Record	Appearance	Previous
Connecticut	16–3	4th	1983
Iowa	14–4–3	3rd	1983
Massachusetts	13–4	4th	1983
New Hampshire	16–2–1	2nd	1983
North Carolina	14–4	2nd	1983
Northwestern	17–1–1	3rd	1983
Old Dominion	20–0	4th	1983
Penn State	14–7–1	3rd	1983
Rutgers	14–3–4	1st	Never
San Jose State	10–2–2	4th	1983
Temple	17–4	3rd	1983
Virginia	10–7	2nd	1982

== Bracket ==
First round November 10; Campus sites
Virginia (3OT, PS)	2
North Carolina	1
Connecticut (3OT, PS)	4
Massachusetts	3
Rutgers	3
Penn State	0
Iowa	5
San Jose State	2

Second round November 11; Campus sites
1	Old Dominion	10
Virginia	0
4	New Hampshire	2
Connecticut (OT)	3
3	Temple	5
Rutgers	2
2	Northwestern	0
Iowa	2

Semifinals; November 17; Springfield, MA
1	Old Dominion	2
Connecticut	1
3	Temple	0
Iowa	2

Championship; November 18; Springfield, MA
1	Old Dominion	5
Iowa	1

== See also ==
- 1984 NCAA Division II field hockey tournament
- 1984 NCAA Division III field hockey tournament
