= 1981 AIAW Division I field hockey tournament =

1981 AIAW-USFHA Division I field hockey tournament
Tournament details
- Host country: United States
- City: Berkeley, California
- Teams: 8
- Venue: University of California, Berkeley

Final positions
- Champions: Penn State (2nd title)
- Runner-up: Temple
- Third place: Davis & Elkins

Tournament statistics
- Matches played: 12
- Goals scored: 42 (3.5 per match)

The 1981 Division I AIAW-USFHA field hockey tournament was the seventh annual and final single-elimination tournament joint hosted by the Association for Intercollegiate Athletics for Women and the United States Field Hockey Association to determine the national champion of women's collegiate field hockey among their Division I members in the United States, the culmination of the 1981 AIAW Division I field hockey season.

The field for the AIAW tournament decreased for the first time, shrinking from sixteen to eight. This contraction was the result of the NCAA holding its first Division I field hockey tournament concurrent to this one. That tournament, with a field of six teams (including multiple former AIAW affiliates), was won and hosted by Connecticut.

This would go on to be the final AIAW Division I tournament, the result of all of the AIAW's remaining field hockey programs migrating to the NCAA ahead of its 1982 season and tournament.

In this final AIAW tournament, defending champions Penn State won their second national title, defeating Temple in the final, 5–1.

This tournament was played at the University of California, Berkeley in Berkeley, California.

== Bracket ==
=== Championship ===
First round
California	1
Temple	3
Davis & Elkins	1*
Virginia	0
Iowa	2*
Washington State	1
Dartmouth	0
Penn State	2

Semifinals
Temple	5
Davis & Elkins	1
Iowa	1
Penn State	4

Championship
Temple	1
Penn State	5
Third place
Davis & Elkins	2
Iowa	1

=== Consolation ===
Consolation semifinals
California	3
Virginia	0
Washington State	2
Dartmouth	1

Fifth place
California	1*
Washington State	0
Seventh place
Virginia	3*
Dartmouth	2

- * indicates an overtime period

== See also ==
- 1981 AIAW Division II field hockey tournament
- 1981 AIAW Division III field hockey tournament
