= Donna Lee (disambiguation) =

"Donna Lee" is a 1947 bebop jazz standard recorded by the Charlie Parker Quintet.

Donna Lee may also refer to:

- Donna Lee (album), 1972 album by Anthony Braxton
- Donna Lee (field hockey) (born 1960), American field hockey player
- Donna Lee Bakery murders, 1974 mass murder in New Britain, Connecticut
