= Adele Mears =

American field hockey player

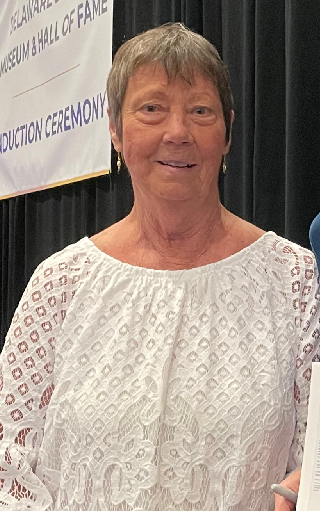
- Mears in 2026

Sport
- Sport: Field hockey
- Position: Center halfback
Youth career
- Years: Team
- 1980–1983: Old Dominion

Adele Mears is an American former field hockey player. She played in college for the Old Dominion Lady Monarchs, where she co-captained two national championship teams and was a first-team All-American. In 2026, she was selected for induction to the Delaware Sports Museum and Hall of Fame.

== Biography ==
Mears grew up in Lewes, Delaware. She attended Cape Henlopen High School in Lewes where she competed in field hockey, basketball and softball and was a top performer in each sport. Mears was a member of Cape Henlopen's field hockey team which compiled a record of 47–5 from 1976 to 1979. In Mears's senior year, the team went 16–0 with 15 shutouts, outscoring their opponents 63 to 2 while winning their first state title in the sport. Mears was named second-team All-Henlopen Conference in field hockey in 1977 and then first-team all-conference in 1978 and 1979. As a senior, she was considered the top defensive player in the state. Mears also was a top basketball player, earning honorable mention all-state honors at point guard as a junior and then second-team all-state as a senior when she helped Cape Henlopen to a 20–1 (Note: Listed in some sources as 20–1, others as 21–1.) record with a conference title. She was co-team captain of the 1979–80 basketball team. She graduated from high school in 1980. After high school, she signed to play college field hockey for the Old Dominion Lady Monarchs on a full scholarship.

Mears attended Old Dominion from 1980 to 1983, where she was a physical education major. She did not play for most of the 1981 season, her sophomore year, due to a tearing ligaments in her right knee. Mears, a center halfback, was then one of Old Dominion's top defensive players in 1982 and 1983 and served as co-team captain both years. She helped the 1982 team to a record of 20–1. At the 1982 NCAA Division I field hockey tournament, she scored the game-winning goal in overtime in a 4–3 win over the Penn State Lady Lions and then helped the Lady Monarchs to a 3–2 win over defending champion Connecticut in the finals to win the national title. As a senior in 1983, Mears helped Old Dominion to a record of 19–1 and their second consecutive national championship, a 3–1 win against Connecticut in triple overtime. She was selected a first-team All-American by the U.S. Field Hockey Association for her performance.

Cape Gazette writer Dave Frederick described Mears as "one of Cape's greatest athletes of all time". In 2026, she was selected for induction to the Delaware Sports Museum and Hall of Fame.
