= Keith Gill (athletic director) =

American football conference commissioner

Current position
- Title: Commissioner
- Conference: Sun Belt

Biographical details
- Education: Duke University (BA); University of Oklahoma (MA)

Playing career
- 1990–1993: Duke
- Position: Running back

Administrative career (AD unless noted)
- 1995–1999: NCAA (Membership services rep.)
- 1999–2000: Vanderbilt (assistant AD)
- 2000–2004: NCAA (Dir. of Membership services)
- 2004–2007: Oklahoma (Sr. assoc. AD)
- 2007–2012: American
- 2012–2017: Richmond
- 2017–2019: A-10 (exec. Assoc. Commissioner)
- 2019–present: Sun Belt (Commissioner)

Keith Allen Gill is an American college sports administrator who serves as the commissioner of the Sun Belt Conference, a collegiate athletic conference in the United States. Gill is also the first African-American to serve as a commissioner an NCAA Division I Football Bowl Subdivision (FBS) conference.

== Early life and education ==
Gill was born to parents Bill (father) and Carrie (mother). Gill grew up in Winter Park, Florida and graduated from Winter Park High School in 1990. Gill played on the high school's football (as a fullback), baseball (as an outfielder), and track and field teams. During Gill's junior season, he helped the football team finish with a 9-2 record and earned all-Orange County offensive team honorable mention. Gill also helped the baseball team to a "district.. and region champion[ship]" and a 26-6 season. During Gill's senior season, he earned Golden Helmet Awards honorable mention, helped the team finish, again, with a 9-2 record, including a win in the Kumquat Bowl: A high school postseason bowl game, and earned all-Orange County offensive team honorable mention for the second consecutive year. Gill was selected among six finalists as Downtown Athletic Club of Orlando's Scholar-Athlete Leader Award and to receive the Youth Educational Sports Scholarship (YESS) scholarship, as a result. The high school's head football coach Larry Gergley described Gill as a "dedicated and hardworking individual" and that his "running style makes him very tough".

Gill attended college at Duke University, where he played running back on the Duke Blue Devils football team under head coach Barry Wilson. Gill's playing time was primarily on kickoff returns. During Gill's junior season, Gill was named to both, among the 225 total athletes at Duke, to make the Atlantic Coast Conference (ACC) honor roll and, among 156 total athletes at the university, to Duke's Iron Duke Student-Athlete All-Star team honors. Gill graduated with Bachelor of Arts degrees in history and sociology in 1994.

Gill graduated with a Master's degree from the University of Oklahoma in 2007.

== Career ==
Gill previously served as athletic director at the University of Richmond from 2012 to 2017, as athletic director at American University from 2007 to 2012, and as senior associate athletic director at the University of Oklahoma from 2000 to 2004. Gill was named the commissioner of the Sun Belt Conference on March 18, 2019. Gill has also worked many other collegiate jobs, such as working as the NCAA membership services representative from 1995 to 1999 and again from 2004 to 2007 as the director of membership services, assistant athletic director at Vanderbilt University from 1999 to 2000, and as executive associate commissioner for the Atlantic 10 Conference from 2017 to 2019.

In addition to his work as commissioner, Gill is currently serving a five-year term on the NCAA Division I Men's Basketball Committee, a tenure that started during the 2021–22 NCAA Division I men's basketball season. In July 2024, Gill was elected to the vice-chair position of the committee for the 2024–25 NCAA Division I men's basketball season, and as chair for the 2025-26 season.

== Personal life and awards ==
Gill was selected as a semifinalist for the National Merit Scholarship Program during his senior year of high school by Orange County (Florida) school officials.

Gill was one of the 230 total students selected by Walt Disney World's Dreamers and Doers Award in 1990.

Gill organized and participated in events related to substance abuse prevention
