= Gabriela Liz =

Argentine field hockey player

Personal information
- Born: December 31, 1961 (age 64)
Medal record
Women's field hockey
Representing Argentina
Pan American Games
| Gold medal – first place | 1987 Indianapolis | Team |
| Gold medal – first place | 1991 Havana | Team |

Gabriela A. Liz (born December 31, 1961) is a retired female field hockey player from Argentina. She was the captain of the Women's National Team that finished in seventh place at the 1988 Summer Olympics in Seoul, South Korea. Liz twice won a gold medal at the Pan American Games (1987 and 1991), and ended her international career after the 1998 Women's Hockey World Cup.
