= Jan Martin =

New Zealand field hockey player

Jan Elizabeth Martin (born 21 November 1959) is a retired female field hockey player from New Zealand, who was a member of the national team that finished sixth at the 1984 Summer Olympics in Los Angeles, California. She was born in Auckland.
