= Christy Morgan =

American field hockey player

Christine Lee "Christy" Morgan (born October 13, 1963, in Norristown, Pennsylvania) is an American former field hockey player who competed in the 1988 Summer Olympics.

Currently, Christy is head coach for women's field hockey at James Madison University.

== College ==
While at Old Dominion, Donnelly won the Honda Award (now the Honda Sports Award) as the nation's best field hockey player for the 1984–85 season.
