= Yolanda Hightower =

American field hockey player

Personal information
- Born: January 20, 1961 (age 65) Portsmouth, Virginia
Medal record
Women's field hockey
Representing United States
Pan American Games
Silver medal – second place	1987 Indianapolis	Team

Yolanda Hightower (born January 20, 1961) is an American former field hockey player who competed in the 1988 Summer Olympics. She won the silver medal at the Pan American Games in Indianapolis. In 2001, Hightower was inducted into the Virginia Sports Hall of Fame.

== College ==
While at Old Dominion, Hightower won the Honda Award (now the Honda Sports Award) as the nation's best field hockey player for the 1982–83 season.
