= Kate Parker (sportsperson) =

British field hockey player

Kate Parker (born 9 September 1963) is a British former field hockey player who competed in the 1988 Summer Olympics.
