= Jessica Barnett =

Canadian field hockey player (born 1991)

Personal information
- Born: June 5, 1991 (age 35) North Vancouver, British Columbia
- Education: Iowa

Sport
- Country: Canada
- Sport: Field hockey
- Club: West Vancouver FHC

Jessica Barnett (born June 5, 1991) is a female field hockey player, who played for the Canada national field hockey team as a defender at the 2014 Commonwealth Games. She attended the University of Iowa, where she was a two time All-American while playing for the Hawkeyes.
