= 1983 NCAA Division I field hockey tournament =

Tournament details
- Host country: United States
- City: Philadelphia, Pennsylvania
- Dates: November 13–21, 1983
- Teams: 12
- Venue: Franklin Field

Final positions
- Champions: Old Dominion (2nd title)
- Runner-up: Connecticut
- Third place: Massachusetts

Tournament statistics
- Matches played: 11
- Goals scored: 34 (3.09 per match)

The 1983 NCAA Division I field hockey tournament was the third annual single-elimination tournament hosted by the National Collegiate Athletic Association to determine the national champion of women's collegiate field hockey among its Division I members in the United States, the culmination of the 1983 NCAA Division I field hockey season.

Old Dominion won their second consecutive championship, defeating Connecticut in the final, 3–1 after three overtime periods. This was a rematch of the previous year's final, also won by the Lady Monarchs.

== Qualifying ==
Team	Record	Appearance	Previous
California	12–5–1	2nd	1982
Connecticut	16–0–2	3rd	1982
Iowa	19–2–2	2nd	1982
Massachusetts	14–2–2	3rd	1982
New Hampshire	14–3–2	1st	Never
North Carolina	12–3–3	1st	Never
Northwestern	18–3	2nd	1982
Old Dominion	16–1	3rd	1982
Penn	9–4	1st	Never
Penn State	14–2–5	2nd	1982
San Jose State	13–5	3rd	1982
Temple	13–4–2	2nd	1982

== Bracket ==
First round November 13; Regional sites
Penn State	1
New Hampshire	0
Storrs, CT
Northwestern	2
San Jose State	0
Iowa City, IA
Temple	1
Penn	0
Philadelphia, PA
North Carolina	2
California	1
Norfolk, VA

Second round November 14; Regional sites
1	Connecticut	1
Penn State	0
4	Iowa	1
Northwestern	2
3	Massachusetts	3
Temple	1
2	Old Dominion	8
North Carolina	0

Semifinals; November 20; Philadelphia, PA
1	Connecticut	2
Northwestern	0
3	Massachusetts	2
2	Old Dominion	3*

Championship; November 21; Philadelphia, PA
1	Connecticut	1
2	Old Dominion	3***
Third place
Northwestern	1
3	Massachusetts	2†

- † = Penalty shoot-out

== See also ==
- 1983 NCAA Division II field hockey tournament
- 1983 NCAA Division III field hockey tournament
