= Susan Furmage =

New Zealand field hockey player

Susan Maureen Furmage (born 27 February 1963) is a former field hockey player from New Zealand, who finished in eight position with the National Women's Field Hockey Team, nicknamed The Black Sticks, at the 1992 Summer Olympics in Barcelona. She was born in London, England.

Lives in New Zealand married to Terry Furmage, and has four daughters including twins. Furmage now works at Bethlehem College and teaches hockey, while her husband is deputy head teacher in a Greerton School.
