= 1981 NCAA Division I field hockey tournament =

Tournament details
- Host country: United States
- City: Storrs, Connecticut
- Dates: November 14–22, 1981
- Teams: 6
- Venue: Memorial Stadium

Final positions
- Champions: Connecticut (1st title)
- Runner-up: Massachusetts (1st title game)
- Third place: Old Dominion

Tournament statistics
- Matches played: 5
- Goals scored: 15 (3 per match)

The 1981 NCAA Division I field hockey tournament was the first annual single-elimination tournament hosted by the National Collegiate Athletic Association to determine the national champion of women's collegiate field hockey among its Division I members in the United States, the culmination of the 1981 NCAA Division I field hockey season.

Connecticut won the first championship, defeating the Massachusetts in the final, 4–1.

The tournament finals were played at Memorial Stadium at the University of Connecticut in Storrs, Connecticut from November 14–22.

== Qualifying ==
Team	Record	Appearance
Connecticut	10–2–4	1st
Long Beach State	8–1–2	1st
Massachusetts	16–0–2	1st
Old Dominion	12–1–2	1st
Purdue	12–5–5	1st
San Jose State	8–1–1	1st

== Bracket ==
First round November 14
Long Beach State	2
San Jose State	1
Connecticut (2OT)	2
Purdue	1

Semifinals; November 21
Massachusetts	1
Long Beach State	0
Old Dominion	0
Connecticut	3

Championship; November 22
Massachusetts	1
Connecticut	4
Third place November 22
Long Beach State	1
Old Dominion	2

== All-tournament team ==
- Sue Caples, Massachusetts
- Tish Stevens, Massachusetts
- Judy Strong, Massachusetts

== See also ==
- 1981 AIAW Division I field hockey tournament
- 1981 NCAA Division II field hockey tournament
- 1981 NCAA Division III field hockey tournament
