= Megan Donnelly =

American field hockey player

Personal information
- Born: May 11, 1964 (age 62)
Medal record
Women's field hockey
Representing United States
Pan American Games
Silver medal – second place	1987 Indianapolis	Team

Megan Donnelly (born May 11, 1964) is an American former field hockey player who competed in the 1988 Summer Olympics. She won the silver medal at the Pan American Games in Indianapolis.

== College ==
In 1986, while at Massachusetts, Donnelly won the Honda Award (now the Honda Sports Award) as the nation's best field hockey player.
