= Mary Koboldt =

American field hockey player

Mary Koboldt (born March 18, 1964) is an American former field hockey player who competed in the 1988 Summer Olympics. She attended the University of Iowa, where she played for the Hawkeyes.
