= Cathy Baker (field hockey) =

New Zealand field hockey player

Catherine Marie Thompson-Baker (born 16 October 1957 in Lumsden) is a former field hockey player from New Zealand, who was a member of the national team that finished sixth at the 1984 Summer Olympics in Los Angeles, California.
