= 1982 NCAA Division I field hockey tournament =

Tournament details
- Host country: United States
- City: Philadelphia, Pennsylvania
- Dates: November 13–21, 1982
- Teams: 12
- Venue: Geasey Field

Final positions
- Champions: Old Dominion (1st title)
- Runner-up: Connecticut
- Third place: Delaware

Tournament statistics
- Matches played: 11
- Goals scored: 43 (3.91 per match)

The 1982 NCAA Division I field hockey tournament was the second annual single-elimination tournament hosted by the National Collegiate Athletic Association to determine the national champion of women's collegiate field hockey among its Division I members in the United States, the culmination of the 1982 NCAA Division I field hockey season.

This was the first NCAA Division I tournament held after the migration of all remaining AIAW field hockey programs to the NCAA. With the subsequent obsolescence of the AIAW tournament after the 1981 season, the NCAA tournament expanded its field for the 1982 edition from six to twelve.

Top-seeded Old Dominion defeated defending national champion Connecticut in the final, 3–2, to claim the Lady Monarchs' first national title.

== Qualifying ==
Team	Record	Appearance	Previous
California	11–3	1st	None
Connecticut	15–2	2nd	1981
Delaware	13–4–1	1st	None
Iowa	20–1	1st	None
Massachusetts	14–3–1	2nd	1981
Northwestern	15–4	1st	Never
Old Dominion	16–1	2nd	1981
Penn State	13–4	1st	Never
Princeton	12–2–1	1st	Never
San Jose State	13–5	2nd	1981
Temple	13–2	1st	Never
Virginia	14–4	1st	Never

== Bracket ==
First round November 13
Northwestern	4
Virginia	2
5	California (2OT)	2
San Jose State	1
Delaware	3
6	Princeton	2
Iowa	1
Massachusetts	0

Quarterfinals; November 14
1	Old Dominion	1
Northwestern	0
4	Penn State (2OT, PS)	2
5	California	1
3	Temple	2
Delaware	3
2	Connecticut (2OT)	3
Iowa	2

Semifinals; November 20
1	Old Dominion (OT)	4
4	Penn State	3
Delaware	0
2	Connecticut	2

Championship; November 21
1	Old Dominion	3
2	Connecticut	2
Third place
4	Penn State	0
Delaware	4

== See also ==
- 1982 NCAA Division II field hockey tournament
- 1982 NCAA Division III field hockey tournament
