= Donna Lee (field hockey) =

American field hockey player

Donna Lee (born July 27, 1960) is an American former field hockey player who competed in the 1988 Summer Olympics. She was born in Boston, Massachusetts and attended the University of Iowa, where she played for the Hawkeyes.
