= Old Dominion Monarchs field hockey =

American college field hockey team

- University: Old Dominion University
- Head coach: Andrew Griffiths (11th season)
- Conference: Big East
- Location: Norfolk, Virginia, US
- Stadium: L.R. Hill Sports Complex (capacity: 1,500)
- Nickname: Monarchs (2013–present); Lady Monarchs (1969–2012)
- Colors: Slate blue, silver, and light blue
Home	Away

NCAA tournament championships
- 1982, 1983, 1984, 1988, 1990, 1991, 1992, 1998, 2000

NCAA tournament runner-up
- 1985, 1989, 1997

NCAA tournament Semifinals
- 1981, 1982, 1983, 1984, 1985, 1988, 1989, 1990, 1991, 1992, 1996, 1997, 1998, 2000, 2002, 2005, 2011

NCAA tournament appearances
- 1981, 1982, 1983, 1984, 1985, 1986, 1987, 1988, 1989, 1990, 1991, 1992, 1993, 1994, 1995, 1996, 1997, 1998, 1999, 2000, 2001, 2002, 2003, 2004, 2005, 2006, 2007, 2010, 2011, 2012, 2013, 2023, 2026

Conference tournament championships
- 1991, 1992, 1993, 1994, 1996, 1997, 1998, 1999, 2000 2001, 2002, 2003, 2005, 2010, 2011, 2023, 2026

The Old Dominion Monarchs field hockey team (formerly the Lady Monarchs) represents Old Dominion University in Norfolk, Virginia. The team currently competes as a Big East Conference affiliate of NCAA Division I field hockey.

== History ==
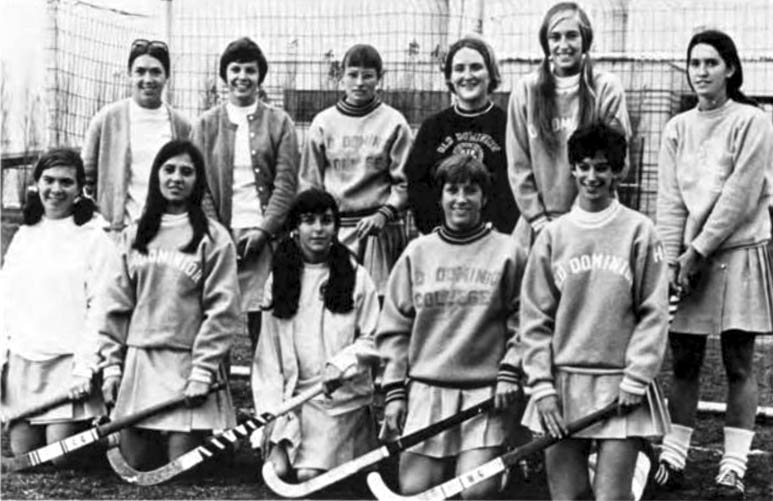
Old Dominion field hockey team in 1971

The Old Dominion field hockey program initiated as the Norfolk Division Braves of the College of William & Mary in 1930, competing with local high school clubs and trade schools prior to its independence. Once the independent Old Dominion College was established after governor Albertis Harrison dissolved the William & Mary college system in 1962, the field hockey program began competitions with other local, independent college clubs.

Competitions expanded past the local level after the hiring of head coach Beth Anders in the early 1980s. Under her 30-season tenure as head coach, the Monarchs achieved nine NCAA tournament championship titles, producing six Honda Sports Award winners and 17 competitors in the Olympic Games. Anders helped the U.S. field hockey team win bronze in the 1984 Summer Olympics, won 12 CAA Coach of the Year awards, and was the winningest coach in NCAA history upon her retirement. The Monarchs hired former Canadian forward Andrew Griffiths following Anders' departure. Griffiths remains as ODU's head coach as of the 2023 season.

The Monarchs previously competed in the Colonial Athletic Association from 1991 to 2012 prior to Old Dominion's move to the FBS. While Conference USA served as ODU's primary conference starting in 2013, they did not sponsor field hockey as a sport. The field hockey program joined the new Big East Conference as an associate member following its conference realignment.

== Stadium ==
The Monarchs play their games at the Powhatan Sports Complex on ODU campus in Norfolk, Virginia, which permanently seats 1,500 and holds an AstroTurf playing surface. The venue has received national attention through its hosting of three NCAA Division I field hockey tournaments.

The Old Dominion field hockey program previously played at Foreman Field (now S.B. Ballard Stadium) prior to the establishment of the sports complex in 2008. The complex was built to provide a home to ODU field hockey due to the re-establishment of their football program in 2009, which would replace the stadium's occupancy during the fall sports season. Three previous NCAA tournament championships were played at Foreman Field, including the 2000 championship won by Old Dominion.

== All-time record ==
Year	Head coach	Overall	Conf.	Conf. Tournament	NCAA Tournament
1974	Carl Anthony	1–7–1	–	–	–
1975	Mikki Flowers	3–6–2	–	–	–
1976	Mikki Flowers	5–13	–	–	–
1977	Mikki Flowers	6–6	–	–	–
1978	Mikki Flowers	11–7	–	–	–
1979	Mikki Flowers	8–6–1	–	–	–
1980	Beth Anders	18–4	–	–	–
1981	Beth Anders	13–2–2	–	–	Semifinals
1982	Beth Anders	20–1	–	–	Champions
1983	Beth Anders	19–1	–	–	Champions
1984	Beth Anders	23–0	–	–	Champions
1985	Melissa Magee	20–7	–	–	Runner up
1986	Melissa Magee	18–2–2	–	–	Quarterfinals
1987	Beth Anders	17–5–1	–	–	Quarterfinals
1988	Beth Anders	26–1	–	–	Champions
1989	Beth Anders	24–2	–	–	Runner up
1990	Beth Anders	23–2–1	–	–	Champions
1991	Beth Anders	26–0	7–0	Champions	Champions
1992	Beth Anders	25–0	6–0	Champions	Champions
1993	Beth Anders	17–4	6–0	Champions	First round
1994	Beth Anders	17–6–1	4–2	Champions	Quarterfinals
1995	Beth Anders	16–9	5–1	Runner up	Quarterfinals
1996	Beth Anders	19–5	6–0	Champions	Semifinals
1997	Beth Anders	22–3	6–0	Champions	Runner up
1998	Beth Anders	23–2	6–0	Champions	Champions
1999	Beth Anders	17–7	5–0	Champions	Quarterfinals
2000	Beth Anders	25–1	5–0	Champions	Champions
2001	Beth Anders	18–5	3–0	Champions	Quarterfinals
2002	Beth Anders	21–4	7–0	Champions	Semifinals
2003	Sue Meyers (interim)	14–10	6–1	Champions	Quarterfinals
2004	Beth Anders	13–8	6–1	Semifinals	First round
2005	Beth Anders	19–6	8–0	Champions	Semifinals
2006	Beth Anders	19–4	8–0	Runner up	First round
2007	Beth Anders	12–11	8–0	Runner up	First round
2008	Beth Anders	10–13	6–2	Runner up	–
2009	Beth Anders	9–11	5–3	–	–
2010	Beth Anders	13–11	7–1	Champions	Quarterfinals
2011	Beth Anders	22–3	8–0	Champions	Semifinals
2012	Beth Anders	15–6	7–0	–	Quarterfinals
2013	Andrew Griffiths	13–8	6–1	Runner up	First round
2014	Andrew Griffiths	11–8	4–1	Semifinals	–
2015	Andrew Griffiths	9–10	2–3	Semifinals	–
2016	Andrew Griffiths	7–10	3–4	–	–
2017	Andrew Griffiths	8–10	5–2	Semifinals	–
2018	Andrew Griffiths	10–7	3–4	–	–
2019	Andrew Griffiths	11–7	6–1	Runner up	–
2020	Andrew Griffiths	9–5	8–3	Runner up	–
2021	Andrew Griffiths	13–5	5–2	Semifinals	–
2022	Andrew Griffiths	15–3	6–1	Runner up	–
2023	Andrew Griffiths	14–6	6–1	Champions	First round
2024	Andrew Griffiths	11-6	5-2	Semifinals	–
2025	Andrew Griffiths	8-10	5-2	Semifinals	–
2026	Andrew Griffiths	15-5	3-3	Champions	First round

== Individual honors ==
	Name	Year(s)
Honda Sports Award (National Player of the Year)	Marina DiGiacomo	2000
Honda Sports Award (National Player of the Year)	Yogi Hightower	1982
Honda Sports Award (National Player of the Year)	Kelli James	1992
Honda Sports Award (National Player of the Year)	Christy Morgan	1984
Honda Sports Award (National Player of the Year)	Mimi Smith	1998
Honda Sports Award (National Player of the Year)	Tiffany Snow	2002
First Team All-Americans	Willemien Aardenburg	1984
First Team All-Americans	Emma Batten	2011
First Team All-Americans	Diane Bracalente	1982, 1984
First Team All-Americans	Sue Callahan	1993, 1994
First Team All-Americans	Danielle Chellew	1996
First Team All-Americans	Maria DiGiacomo	1999, 2000
First Team All-Americans	Janelle Engle	2005
First Team All-Americans	Jill Fisher	1988
First Team All-Americans	Jackie Grady	1986
First Team All-Americans	Loran Hatch	2010
First Team All-Americans	Tara Herrmann	2002
First Team All-Americans	Yogi Hightower	1981, 1982
First Team All-Americans	Maaike Hilbrand	1991, 1992
First Team All-Americans	Dawn Hill	1985
First Team All-Americans	Jamie Hill	1998
First Team All-Americans	Mary Beth Holder	1981
First Team All-Americans	Kelli James	1990, 1992
First Team All-Americans	Cathy Large	1987
First Team All-Americans	Christy Longacre	2013
First Team All-Americans	Angie Loy	2002, 2003
First Team All-Americans	Adele Mears	1983
First Team All-Americans	Christy Morgan	1982, 1983, 1984
First Team All-Americans	Pam Neiss	1990, 1991
First Team All-Americans	Caroline Nichols	2006
First Team All-Americans	Winnifred Sanders	1990
First Team All-Americans	Carolyn Sarr	1989
First Team All-Americans	Stelly Seltman	1986
First Team All-Americans	Mimi Smith	1997, 1998
First Team All-Americans	Robin Smith	1991, 1992
First Team All-Americans	Tiffany Snow	2001, 2002
First Team All-Americans	Marijolijn van der Sommen	2001
First Team All-Americans	Cheryl Van Kuren	1984, 1985
First Team All-Americans	Evaline Veraat	1983, 1984
First Team All-Americans	Cindy Wallace	1984
First Team All-Americans	Adrienne Yoder	2000, 2001
Conference Player(s) of the Year	Emma Batten	2011
Conference Player(s) of the Year	Danielle Chellew	1996
Conference Player(s) of the Year	Marina DiGiacomo	1997, 1998, 1999, 2000
Conference Player(s) of the Year	Janelle Engle	2005
Conference Player(s) of the Year	Kelli James	1992
Conference Player(s) of the Year	Angie Loy	2003
Conference Player(s) of the Year	Caroline Nichols	2006
Conference Player(s) of the Year	Robin Smith	1991
Conference Player(s) of the Year	Tiffany Snow	2002
Conference Player(s) of the Year	Rosario Villagra (off.)	2013
Conference Player(s) of the Year	Adrienne Yoder	2001
Conference Coach of the Year	Beth Anders	1991, 1992, 1997, 1998, 1999, 2000, 2002, 2005, 2006, 2007, 2011, 2012
Conference Coach of the Year	Andrew Griffiths	2013

== See also ==
- List of NCAA Division I field hockey programs
