= Iowa Hawkeyes field hockey =

Field hockey team representing the University of Iowa

- Founded: 1977
- University: University of Iowa
- Athletic director: Beth Goetz
- Head coach: Lisa Cellucci (13th season)
- Conference: Big 10
- Location: Iowa City, Iowa
- Stadium: Dr. Christine H.B. Grant Field (capacity: 1,000)
- Nickname: Hawkeyes
- Colors: Gold

NCAA tournament championships
- 1986

NCAA tournament runner-up
- 1984, 1988, 1992

NCAA tournament Semifinals
- 1984, 1986, 1987, 1988, 1989, 1990, 1992, 1993, 1994, 1999, 2008, 2020

NCAA tournament appearances
- 1982, 1983, 1984, 1985, 1986, 1987, 1988, 1989, 1990, 1991, 1992, 1993, 1994, 1995, 1996, 1999, 2004, 2006, 2007, 2008, 2011, 2012, 2018, 2019, 2020, 2021, 2022, 2023, 2026

Conference tournament championships
- 1981, 1994, 2006, 2007, 2008, 2019

Conference regular season championships
- 1981, 1982, 1983, 1985, 1986, 1987, 1992, 1995, 1996, 1999, 2004, 2019, 2021

The Iowa Hawkeyes field hockey team is the intercollegiate field hockey program who is representing the University of Iowa. The school competes in the Big Ten Conference in Division I of the National Collegiate Athletic Association (NCAA). The Iowa field hockey team plays its home games at Dr. Christine H.B. Grant Field on the university campus in Iowa City, Iowa. The Hawkeyes have won 16 conference championships (13 in the Big Ten), six Big Ten tournament titles, and the 1986 NCAA Division I field hockey tournament, making it the first Midwestern university to win a national title. As of 2014, the team is coached by Lisa Cellucci.

== History ==
Field hockey has been a varsity sport at the University of Iowa since 1973, before that field hockey was a club sport. Iowa was a leader in early implementation of the Title IX legislation, which was passed in 1972. Christine Grant, PhD, was coach in 1973 and 1974 before she retired from coaching to become Iowa women's athletics director and a national voice for women in sport. She was also president of the Association for Intercollegiate Athletics for Women (AIAW) - which was the governing organization for women's intercollegiate athletics before the NCAA took over. From 1981 to 1989 and again since 1992, the Hawkeyes have been members of the Big Ten Conference, while they participated in the Midwestern Collegiate Field Hockey Conference (MCFHC) during the 1990 and 1991 seasons. Iowa is one of the most accomplished field hockey programs in the Big Ten, with 16 claimed conference championships (13 in the Big Ten), six conference tournament titles, and 11 NCAA Final Four appearances to its credit. In 1986, the Hawkeyes became the first field hockey team from the Midwest to win the national championship, when they beat New Hampshire 2–1 in double overtime in the NCAA title game. Additionally, Iowa has cumulatively amassed a total of 85 national All-Americans, 152 regional All-Americans, and 162 All-Conference selections. In program history, the Hawkeyes have had a total of only five head coaches: Margie Greenberg (1977), Judith Davidson (1978–87), Beth Beglin (1988–99), Tracey Griesbaum (2000–13), and Lisa Cellucci (2014–present). In addition to Cellucci, who is herself a former Iowa player, Hawkeye alumni have attained the position of head coach at numerous other NCAA programs, including Ball State (Annette Payne), Dartmouth (Amy Fowler), Indiana (Amy Robertson), Kent State (Kerry [Horgan] Devries), Michigan (Marcia Pankratz), Princeton (Kristen Holmes-Winn), Rutgers (Liz Tchou), Stanford (Lesley Irvine), and Virginia (Michele Madison and Missi Sanders).

=== Season-by-season results ===
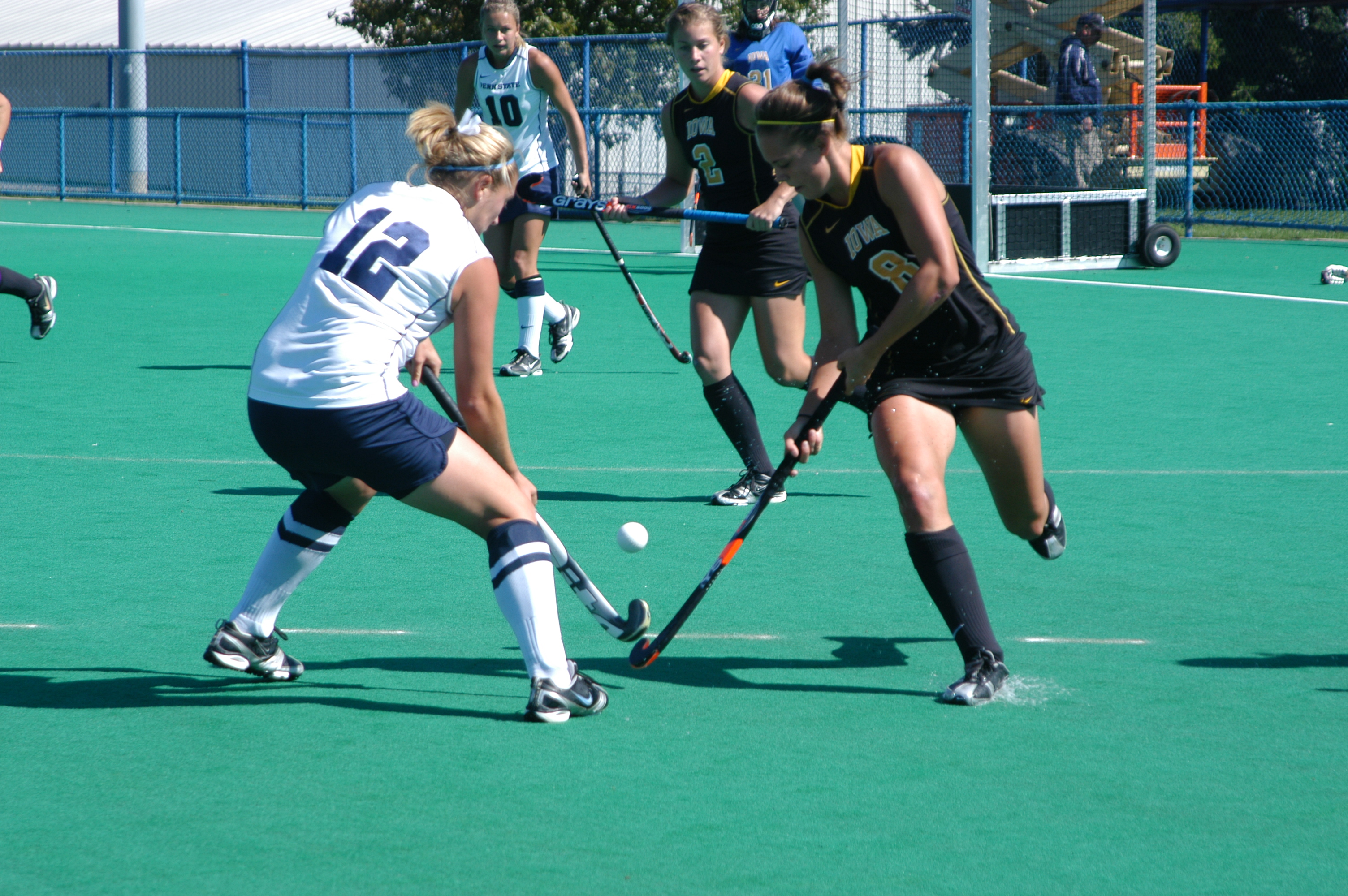
The 2010 Iowa field hockey team in action at Penn State

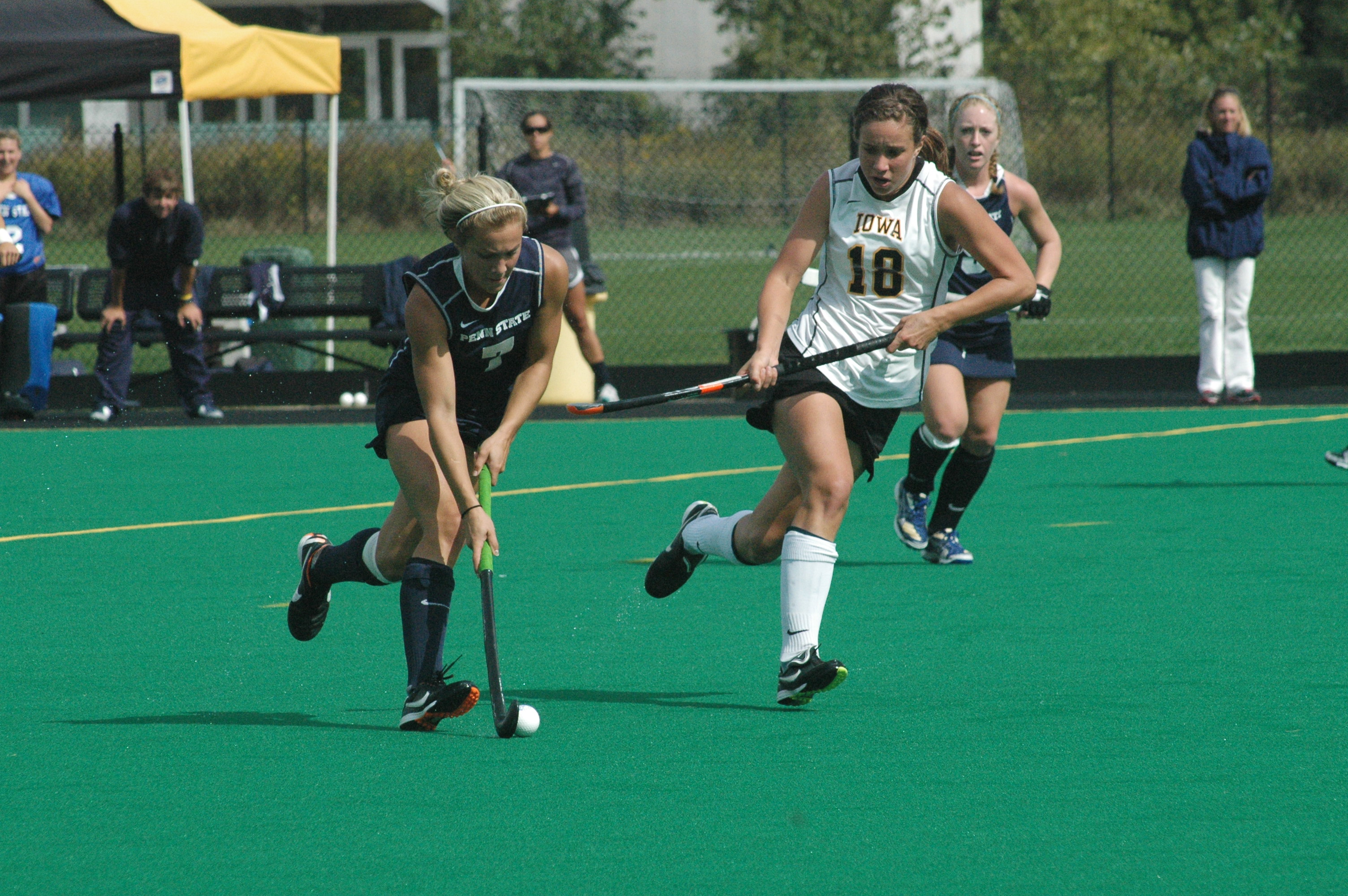
The 2011 Iowa field hockey team in action against Penn State

In 1973, five Hawkeyes were selected to play on the all-Iowa college team: Sue Lewis, Caroline Emrich, Sue Bouch, Liz Ullman, and Robyn Linn. The 1974 season, coached by Christine Grant, had a 1–6–4 record. Two Hawkeyes were selected to play on the State Field Hockey team: Liz Ullman and Sue Bouck. The 1975 team, coached by Margie Greenberg, had a 3–6–2 record. The 1976 team's record was 9–5–2. Three Hawkeyes advanced to the State Team that year: Carla Seltzer, Barb Resnick and Karen Zamora. Karen Zamora was then selected as a qualifier for the National Field Hockey Tournament.

Year	Head coach	Overall	Pct.	Conf.	Pct.	Conf. Place	Conf. Tourn.	Postseason
1977	Margie Greenberg	17–5–3	.740	–	–	–	–	AIAW regional tourn.
1978	Judith Davidson	12–9–4	.560	–	–	–	–	AIAW regional tourn.
1979	Judith Davidson	17–8–1	.673	–	–	–	–	AIAW national tourn.
1980	Judith Davidson	19–7–1	.722	–	–	–	–	AIAW national tourn.
1981	Judith Davidson	25–5–1	.823	3–0	1.000	–	1st	AIAW national tourn.
1982	Judith Davidson	21–2	.913	6–0	1.000	1st	–	NCAA 2nd Round
1983	Judith Davidson	19–3–2	.833	9–1	.900	T1st	–	NCAA 2nd Round
1984	Judith Davidson	17–5–3	.740	8–1–1	.850	2nd	–	NCAA Runner-Up
1985	Judith Davidson	19–4–1	.813	9–1	.900	T1st	–	NCAA 2nd Round
1986	Judith Davidson	19–2–1	.886	9–1	.900	1st	–	NCAA Champions
1987	Judith Davidson	17–5–2	.750	8–0–2	.900	1st	–	NCAA Final Four
1988	Beth Beglin	19–6	.760	6–2	.750	2nd	–	NCAA Runner-Up
1989	Beth Beglin	19–2–2	.870	9–0–1	.950	1st	–	NCAA Final Four
1990	Beth Beglin	20–4	.833	9–1	.900	1st	–	NCAA Final Four
1991	Beth Beglin	17–2–1	.875	10–0	1.000	1st	–	NCAA 2nd Round
1992	Beth Beglin	20–1	.952	10–0	1.000	1st	–	NCAA Runner-Up
1993	Beth Beglin	18–4	.818	8–2	.800	2nd	–	NCAA Final Four
1994	Beth Beglin	15–8	.652	6–4	.600	3rd	1st	NCAA Final Four
1995	Beth Beglin	16–4	.800	10–0	1.000	1st	2nd	NCAA 1st Round
1996	Beth Beglin	18–3	.857	10–0	1.000	1st	2nd	NCAA 1st Round
1997	Beth Beglin	8–10	.444	4–6	.400	4th	T5th	–
1998	Beth Beglin	10–10	.500	4–6	.400	T4th	T3rd	–
1999	Beth Beglin	19–3	.864	9–1	.900	1st	2nd	NCAA Final Four
2000	Tracey Griesbaum	12–8	.600	3–3	.500	T3rd	T3rd	–
2001	Tracey Griesbaum	13–5	.722	3–3	.500	T4th	2nd	–
2002	Tracey Griesbaum	9–8	.529	2–4	.333	T4th	T5th	–
2003	Tracey Griesbaum	11–8	.579	2–4	.333	5th	T5th	–
2004	Tracey Griesbaum	13–8	.619	5–1	.833	T1st	2nd	NCAA 1st Round
2005	Tracey Griesbaum	10–8	.556	3–3	.500	T3rd	T5th	–
2006	Tracey Griesbaum	12–9	.571	2–4	.333	5th	1st	NCAA 1st Round
2007	Tracey Griesbaum	17–4	.810	4–2	.667	3rd	1st	NCAA 1st Round
2008	Tracey Griesbaum	18–5	.783	4–2	.667	2nd	1st	NCAA Final Four
2009	Tracey Griesbaum	9–10	.474	3–3	.500	4th	T3rd	–
2010	Tracey Griesbaum	3–14	.176	0–6	.000	7th	T5th	–
2011	Tracey Griesbaum	11–5	.688	4–2	.667	T2nd	T3rd	NCAA 1st Round
2012	Tracey Griesbaum	14–7	.667	4–2	.667	T2nd	T3rd	NCAA 1st Round
2013	Tracey Griesbaum	13–8	.619	2–4	.333	5th	2nd	–
2014	Lisa Cellucci	11–7	.611	4–4	.500	T5th	T5th	–

Season-by-season results through the end of the 2014 season

== Awards and accolades ==
=== National championships ===
Iowa has been well represented at the NCAA Championships, appearing 22 times with 11 Final Four appearances. In 1986, the Hawkeyes beat conference rivals Northwestern en route to the Final Four. There, they shut out Penn State 2–0 and topped New Hampshire 2–1 for their first national championship, becoming the first women's team at the university to win an NCAA Championship.

Year	Coach	Opponent	Score	Record
1986	Judith Davidson	New Hampshire Wildcats	2–1	19–2–1

=== Conference championships ===
Iowa has won 16 conference titles, 13 in the Big Ten Conference and three in the Midwest Collegiate Field Hockey Conference (MCFHC).

Year	Coach	Conference Record	Overall Record	Conference	NCAA Result
1981	Judith Davidson	3–0	25–5-1	Big Ten	-
1982	Judith Davidson	6–0	21–2	Big Ten	NCAA 2nd Round
1983	Judith Davidson	9–1	19–3–2	Big Ten	NCAA 2nd Round
1985	Judith Davidson	9–1	19–4–1	Big Ten	NCAA 2nd Round
1986	Judith Davidson	9–1	19–2–1	Big Ten	NCAA Champions
1987	Judith Davidson	8–0–2	17–5–2	Big Ten	NCAA Final Four
1989	Beth Beglin	9–0–1	19–2–2	MCFHC	NCAA Final Four
1990	Beth Beglin	9–1	20–4	MCFHC	NCAA Final Four
1991	Beth Beglin	10–0	17–2–1	MCFHC	NCAA 2nd Round
1992	Beth Beglin	10–0	20–1	Big Ten	NCAA Runner-Up
1995	Beth Beglin	10–0	16–4	Big Ten	NCAA 1st Round
1996	Beth Beglin	10–0	18–3	Big Ten	NCAA 1st Round
1999	Beth Beglin	9–1	19–3	Big Ten	NCAA Final Four
2004	Tracey Griesbaum	5–1	13–8	Big Ten	NCAA 1st Round
2019	Lisa Cellucci	7–1	17-4	Big Ten	NCAA 2nd Round
2021	Lisa Cellucci	7–1	17-3	Big Ten	NCAA 2nd Round
16 Conference Championships; 13 Big Ten Championships, 3 MCFHC Championships

=== All-Americans ===
Key
First-team selection	Second-team selection	Third-team selection

Season	Player	Remarks
1981	Sue Bury	
1981	Pat Dauley	
1981	Donna Lee	
1982	Sue Bury	Second first-team selection
1982	Donna Lee	Second first-team selection
1983	Ellen Egan	
1984	Deb Brickey	
1984	Kim Hermann	
1984	Mary Koboldt	
1984	Marcia Pankratz	
1985	Deb Brickey	Second first-team selection
1985	Mary Koboldt	Second selection
1985	Marcia Pankratz	Second first-team selection
1986	Karen Napolitano	
1986	RosAnna Salcido	
1987	Liz Tchou	
1988	Cherie Freddie	
1988	Diane Loosbrock	
1988	Erica Richards	
1989	Cherie Freddie	Second first-team selection
1989	Kristy Gleason	
1989	Erica Richards	Second first-team selection
1989	Aileen Trendler	
1990	Kris Fillat	
1990	Amy Fowler	
1990	Kristy Gleason	Second first-team selection
1990	Andrea Wieland	
1991	Heather Bryant	
1991	Amy Fowler	Second selection
1991	Kristy Gleason	Third first-team selection

Season	Player	Remarks
1991	Lisa Sweeney	
1991	Jibs Thorson	
1992	Tiffany Bybel	
1992	Kris Fillat	Second first-team selection
1992	Amy Fowler	Third selection; Second first-team selection
1992	Kristy Gleason	Fourth first-team selection
1992	Jamie Rofrano	
1992	Andrea Wieland	Second first-team selection
1993	Heather Bryant	Second selection
1993	Tiffany Bybel	Second selection
1994	Kristen Holmes	
1994	Debbie Humpage	
1995	Lisa Celluci	
1995	Diane DeMiro	
1995	Jessica Enoch	
1995	Ann Pare	
1996	Lisa Celluci	Second selection
1996	Diane DeMiro	Second first-team selection
1996	Kristen Holmes	Second first-team selection
1996	Melisa Miller	
1997	Kerry Lessard	
1997	Melisa Miller	Second selection
1998	Lisa Celluci	Third selection
1998	Kerry Lessard	Second selection
1999	Kelly Druley	
1999	Quan Nim	
1999	Sarah Thorn	
2000	Natalie Dawson	
2001	Tiffany Leister	

Season	Player	Remarks
2002	Tiffany Leister	Second selection
2003	Pattie Gillem	
2003	Barb Weinberg	
2004	Sarah Dawson	
2004	Barb Weinberg	Second selection
2005	Heather Schnepf	
2006	Heather Schnepf	Second selection
2007	Meghan Beamesdefer	
2007	Lauren Pfeiffer	
2008	Caroline Blaum	Second selection
2008	Roz Ellis	
2008	Lauren Pfeiffer	Second selection
2009	Meghan Beamesdefer	Second selection
2011	Jessica Barnett	
2012	Jessica Barnett	Second selection
2012	Kathleen McGraw	
2013	Natalie Cafone	
2013	Dani Hemeon	
2014	Natalie Cafone	Second selection
2014	Stephanie Norlander	

=== Olympians ===
Olympics	Player	Country
1984	Beth Beglin	United States
1988	Beth Beglin	United States
1988	Mary Koboldt	United States
1988	Donna Lee	United States
1988	Marcia Pankratz	United States
1988	Patty Shea	United States
1996	Kris Fillat	United States
1996	Kristen Holmes	United States
1996	Marcia Pankratz	United States
1996	Patty Shea	United States
1996	Liz Tchou	United States
1996	Andrea Wieland	United States
2008	Barb Weinberg	United States

Awards and accolades through the end of the 2014 season

== Stadium ==
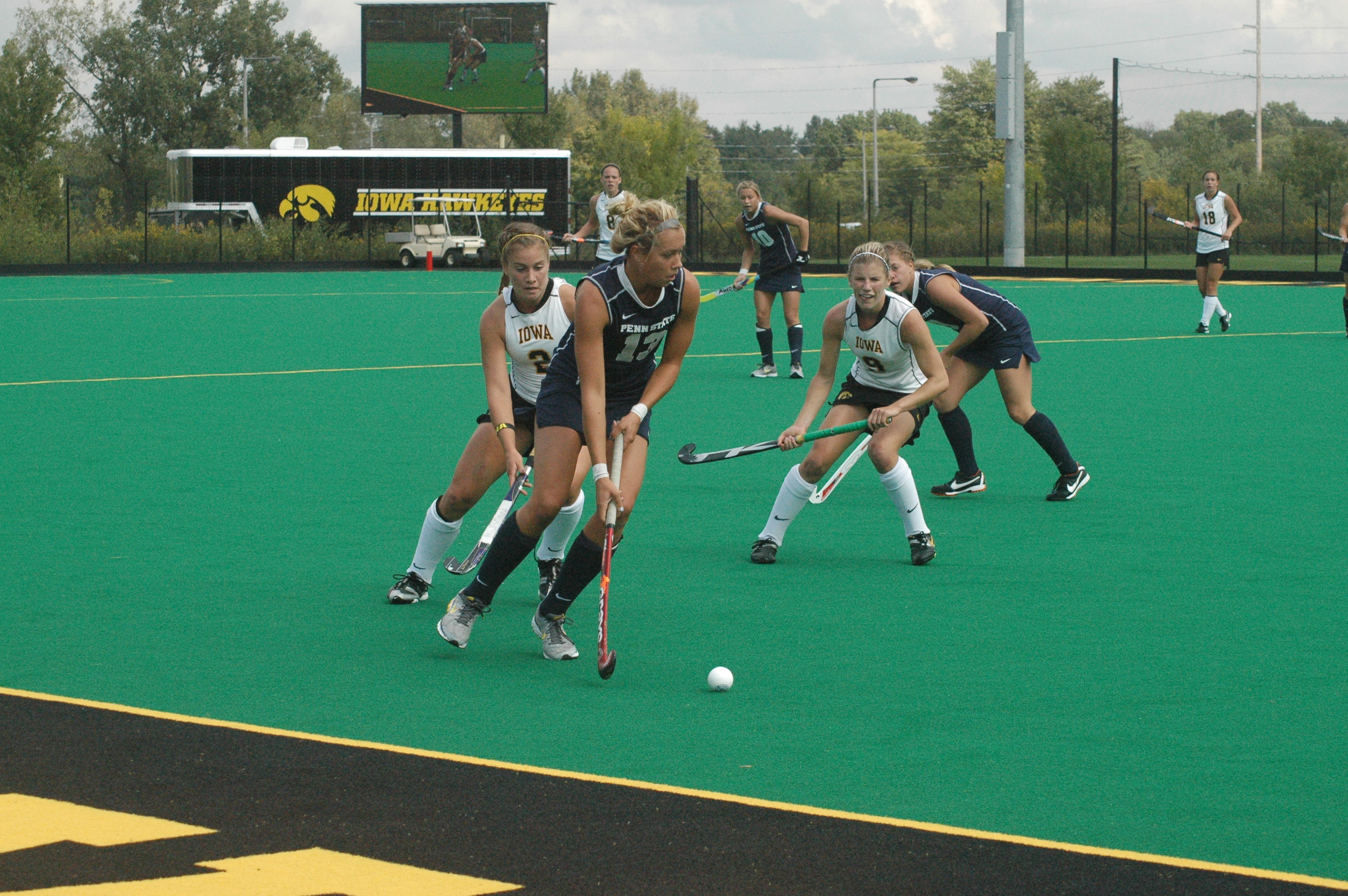
Dr. Christine H.B. Grant Field during a game in 2011

Iowa has played its home games at Dr. Christine H.B. Grant Field since its construction in 1989. Originally named Hawkeye Field Hockey Field, in 1991 the stadium was renamed in honor of Christine Grant, the founder of the Iowa field hockey program and former Women's Athletics director of the university. Grant Field was rededicated in 2006 after the completion of significant renovations that included a new playing surface, a permanent grandstand, new concession facilities, restrooms, and a press box. Described by former Michigan field hockey player and current Big Ten Network analyst Kara Lentz as "the best facility in the Big Ten", Grant Field has witnessed a 40-game Iowa home winning streak in addition to undefeated Hawkeyes home campaigns on six separate occasions. The stadium's official capacity is 1,000, while its all-time single-game attendance record stands at 1,339, which was set during a game against Penn State on October 24, 1993.

== Title IX Activism ==
In the wake of the firing of former University of Iowa Field Hockey Coach Tracey Griesbaum on August 4, 2014, current players Chandler Ackers and Natalie Cafone joined former players Jessy Silfer and Dani Hemeon in filing a Title IX complaint with the U.S. Department of Education. Coach Griesbaum was terminated after former players levied a series of allegations against her coaching methods and the culture within the field hockey program. Despite an internal investigation by the university determining that she had not violated any university policy, Griesbaum was fired just days before the start of the 2014 season.

At the heart of the complaint filed with the Office of Civil Rights (OCR), the agency responsible for overseeing Title IX compliance within the Department of Education, are allegations that the University of Iowa's Athletic Department engages in discriminatory practices and decision-making, often resulting in the removal of highly qualified female coaches from female programs. The student-athletes further allege that the removal of top female coaches deny to female athletes educational benefits protected under Title IX.

As provided by Title IX of the Education Amendments of 1972, "[n]o person in the United States shall, on the basis of sex, be excluded from participation in, be denied the benefits of, or be subjected to discrimination under any education program or activity receiving Federal financial assistance." As a state institution of higher education, the University of Iowa is subject to the provisions of Title IX.

While Title IX compliance issues are commonplace in collegiate athletics, and generally center on such things as equal opportunity to participate, and access to equal facilities, the complaint submitted by the University of Iowa Field Hockey players is unique in its interpretation of gender discrimination. The players contend that Coach Griesbaum was terminated for engaging in the same coaching methods and practices utilized by male coaches. The student-athletes go on to claim that by holding female coaches and student-athletes to different standards than their male counterparts – standards largely shaped by sex stereotypes – the school undermines the success of women's programs, and denies female student-athletes the opportunity to learn from top coaches, and compete at the highest level.

Many of the practices and standards challenged in the complaint are rooted in a paternalistic view of women's athletics. The Title IX complaint cites numerous examples of double standards that exist within the University of Iowa's Athletic Department. For instance, the student-athletes note that the university places a higher level of expectation on female coaches of women's programs to manage players' minor injuries and emotional sensitivities. The complaint alleges a pattern of negative consequences for women coaches for failure to adequately respond to complaints from parents and players.

Conversely, the university is more likely to give male coaches the benefit of the doubt when faced with accusations of wrongdoing. For example, thirteen football players were hospitalized with rhabodomyolysis, a stress-induced degenerative muscle syndrome, after an arduous off-season workout in 2011. Despite the very serious physical injuries facing these football players, the University of Iowa stood by the coach involved in the incident, and he was later named "Assistant Coach of the Year."

Some feminist commentators suggest that the current model of sport is designed for men's interests, and that women's athletic pursuits are less competitive, and more recreational. Advocates of this position would acknowledge real differences between men and women, and construct an athletic system that creates substantive equality between the sexes. Under this view of gender equity, one might be able to argue that different coaching methods are necessary to provide both male and female athletes with similarly positive collegiate athletic experiences.

However, this Title IX complaint filed with the OCR is based on a formal equality approach to gender equity. The University of Iowa Field Hockey student-athletes' allegations are remarkable because it challenges assumptions that would hold female and male student-athletes and coaches to varying levels of competitiveness and standards of behavior. As Ackers and Cafone have made clear, one major draw for many athletes to the University of Iowa Field Hockey program was the opportunity to play under Coach Griesbaum, and be pushed every day to reach their personal and athletic potential. The student-athletes agree, "we want to be made better every single day" and "we don't want to be coddled like little girls." The complaint's premise confronts stereotypes that greatly shape expectations for male and female student-athletes and coaches in college sports.

For their efforts on behalf of gender equality, Ackers, Cafone, Silfer, and Hemeon received the Jean Y. Jew Women's Rights Award. The complaint has sparked a national conversation on double standards that exist for female coaches and student-athletes in collegiate athletics. Although not directly tied to the complaint filed by Ackers, Cafone, Silfer, and Hemeon, the OCR began an audit of the University of Iowa Athletic Department in response allegations of unfair treatment of female student-athletes on April 11, 2016.

== See also ==
- List of NCAA Division I field hockey programs
