= 2005 NCAA Division I field hockey tournament =

Tournament details
- Host country: United States
- City: Louisville, Kentucky
- Dates: November 12–20, 2005
- Venue: Trager Stadium

Final positions
- Champions: Maryland (4th title)
- Runner-up: Duke (3rd title game)

Tournament statistics
- Matches played: 15
- Goals scored: 68 (4.53 per match)

The 2005 NCAA Division I field hockey tournament was the 25th annual tournament organized by the National Collegiate Athletic Association to determine the national champion of women's collegiate field hockey among its Division I members in the United States.

Top-seeded Maryland won their fourth championship, defeating Duke in the final, 1–0.

The semifinals and championship were held at Trager Stadium in Louisville, Kentucky, hosted by the University of Louisville.

== Qualifying ==
Indiana made their debut in the Division I field hockey tournament this year.

== Bracket ==
First round November 12; Campus sites
1	Maryland	4
Richmond	0
American	3
Penn State	2
Michigan	4*
Boston University	3
4	Old Dominion	5
Ohio State	4
3	Duke	2**
Princeton	1
Connecticut	3
Boston College	2
Indiana	3
North Carolina	2
2	Wake Forest	1
California	0

Second round November 13; Campus sites
1	Maryland	3
American	0
Michigan	2
4	Old Dominion	3
3	Duke	3**
Connecticut	2
Indiana	0
2	Wake Forest	5

Semifinals; November 18; Louisville, KY
1	Maryland	3
4	Old Dominion	2
3	Duke	3
2	Wake Forest	2

Championship; November 20; Louisville, KY
1	Maryland	1
3	Duke	0

== See also ==
- 2005 NCAA Division II field hockey tournament
- 2005 NCAA Division III field hockey tournament
