= Phyllis Ocker Field =

Field hockey venue at the University of Michigan

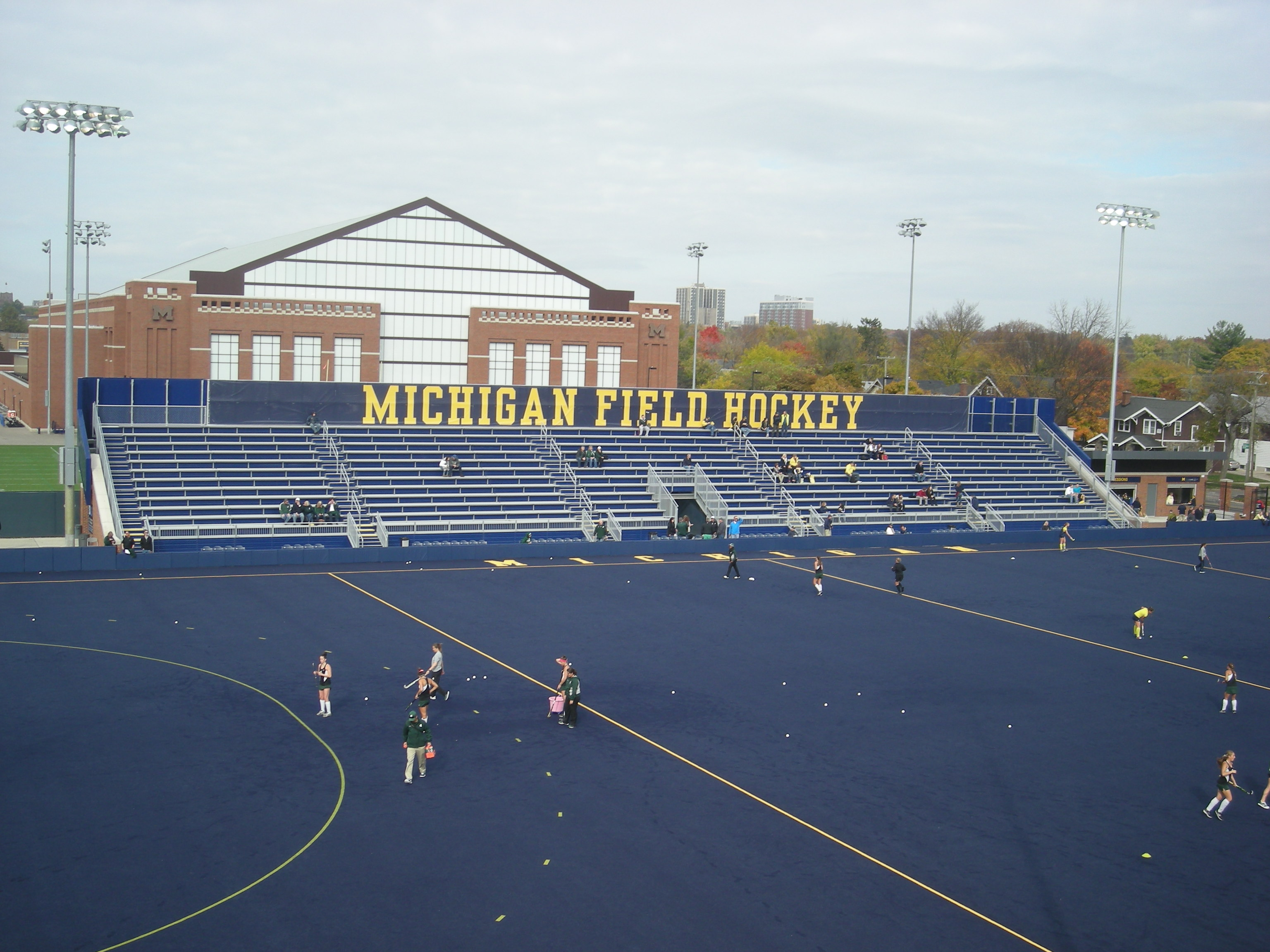
- Phyllis Ocker Field before a game in October 2014
- Interactive map of Phyllis Ocker Field
- Full name: Phyllis Ocker Field Hockey Field
- Location: 1450 S. State St. Ann Arbor, MI 48109
- Coordinates: 42°16′4″N 83°44′27.7″W
- Owner: University of Michigan
- Operator: University of Michigan
- Capacity: 500 (1995–2013); 1,500 (2014–present)
- Surface: AstroTurf 1200 (2003–2013); AstroTurf 12 (2014–2016); Poligras Platinum CoolPlus (2017–present)

Construction
- Opened: September 8, 1995
- Renovated: 2003, 2014
- Cost: $13.5 million (2014 stadium renovation)

Tenant
- Michigan Wolverines field hockey (NCAA) (1995–present)

Phyllis Ocker Field is a 1,500 seat field hockey field on the main campus of the University of Michigan in Ann Arbor, Michigan. The field is named after Phyllis Ocker, a former University of Michigan teacher, field hockey coach, and athletics administrator. The facility opened in 1995.

== History ==
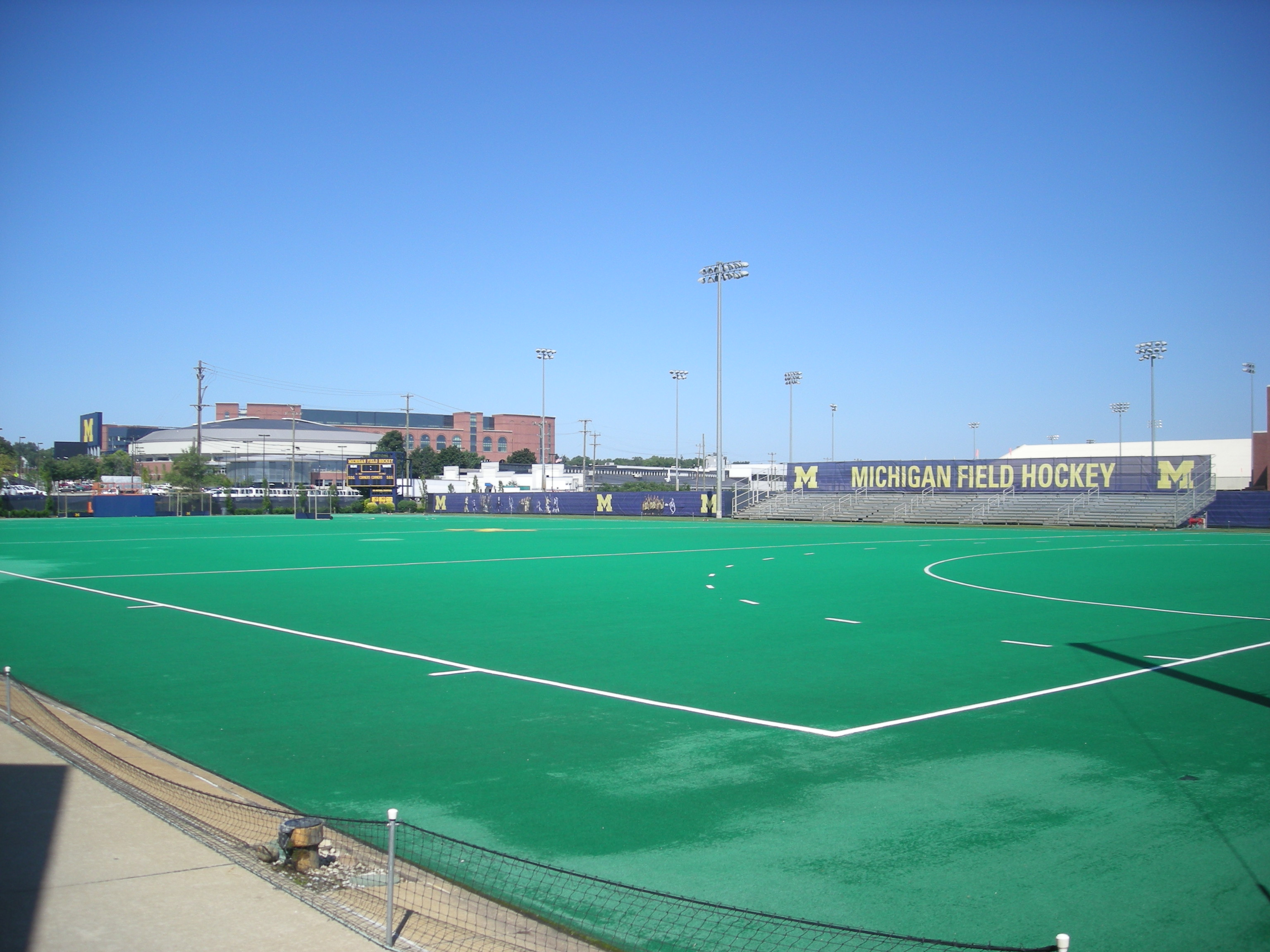
Phyllis Ocker Field as it appeared in August 2013

Michigan has played its home games at Phyllis Ocker Field since its construction in 1995. The field is named after Phyllis Ocker, a former University of Michigan teacher, field hockey coach, and athletics administrator. Between the end of the 2013 season and the start of the 2014 season, Ocker Field underwent substantial renovations that included the installation of a blue AstroTurf 12 playing surface and a permanent 1,500-seat grandstand, which tripled the stadium's capacity. These renovations also included the installation of floodlights, a video scoreboard, and a new 13,000 square-foot support building that provides for locker rooms, training facilities, coaches' offices, and meeting space as well as a press box and broadcasting booth. The support building was built on the footprint of the former South Ferry Sports Services Building, which had provided similar accommodations since its construction in 1997. A new spectator plaza that includes restrooms, concession facilities, and ticket and marketing booths was also constructed during the 2014 renovations. These renovations cost an estimated $13.5 million.

Built partially on the site of Regents Field, the home of the Michigan football team between 1893 and 1905, Ocker Field was constructed in 1995 jointly with the Michigan Soccer Field. In 1997, the South Ferry Sports Services Building was constructed adjacent to the field, providing locker rooms, training facilities, and storage space for both the field hockey and women's soccer teams. In 2003, Ocker Field received a new playing surface, replacing the original turf with SRI Sports' AstroTurf 1200. The playing surface was upgraded at the cost of $500,000, a sum that was raised from donations from friends and alumni of the field hockey program. In 2017 Ocker Field received a new playing surface with the installation of a Poligras Platinum CoolPlus field. Between the 2003 and 2014 renovations, the stadium had a seating capacity of 500. Before the construction of Ocker Field, the Michigan field hockey team had played at four other venues on campus: Michigan Stadium (1973–75), Ferry Field (1976–86), the Tartan Turf (1987–90), and Oosterbaan Fieldhouse (1991–94).

== NCAA Championship ==
Michigan has hosted the NCAA Division I Field Hockey Championship three times in program history, first in 2015, then in 2021, and most recently in 2024. They have also served as regional host for the NCAA first and second rounds on four occasions; in 2001, 2004, 2007, and 2017.
