= NCAA Division I field hockey tournament =

American intercollegiate field hockey tournament

- Association: NCAA
- Sport: College field hockey
- Founded: 1981; 45 years ago
- Division: Division I
- No. of teams: 18
- Country: United States
- Most recent champion: Northwestern (4th title)
- Most titles: North Carolina (11 titles)
- Broadcaster: ESPNU
- Website: NCAA.com
- 2026 NCAA Division I Field Hockey Championship

The NCAA Division I field hockey tournament is an American intercollegiate field hockey tournament that is conducted by the National Collegiate Athletic Association (NCAA), and it determines the Division I national champion. The tournament has been held annually since 1981.

The championship is contested exclusively by the women's teams and there is no equivalent NCAA men's field hockey championship.

The most successful team is the North Carolina Tar Heels, who have eleven titles. In addition, North Carolina has finished national runner-up an NCAA record eleven times.

The most recent championship, in 2026, was won by the Northwestern Wildcats.

== History ==
Field hockey was one of 12 women's sports added to the NCAA championship program for the 1981–82 school year, as the NCAA engaged in battle with the AIAW for sole governance of women's collegiate sports. The AIAW continued to conduct its established championship program in the same 12 (and other) sports; however, after a year of dual women's championships, the NCAA overcame the AIAW and usurped its authority and membership. The first NCAA women's national championship events were staged November 21–22, 1981, in cross country and field hockey.

The tournament originally began with six teams but it has since expanded to currently with 18 schools; at different times a third-place game has been played as well. Under the tournament's current format, the 18 teams qualify for the tournament with two play-in games. The play-in games and first two rounds are played at the home turf of the higher seeds in each matchup. The final four teams then move on to the championship rounds at a predetermined site.

=== AIAW champions ===
- 1975: West Chester State
- 1976: West Chester State (2)
- 1977: West Chester State (3)
- 1978: West Chester State (4)
- 1979: Long Beach State
- 1980: Penn State
- 1981: Penn State (2)

== Past champions ==
NCAA Division I Field Hockey Championship
Year	Site (Host Team)	Stadium	Championship			Third Place Final / Semifinalists		
Year	Site (Host Team)	Stadium	Champion	Score	Runner-up	Third-place	Score	Fourth-place
1981; Details	Storrs, CT	Memorial Stadium	UConn (Note: Used "Connecticut" as its primary athletic brand before the 2013 season.)	4–1	Massachusetts	Old Dominion	2–1 (2OT, PS)	Long Beach State
1982; Details	Philadelphia, PA	Geasey Field	Old Dominion	3–2	UConn	Delaware	4–0	Penn State
1983; Details	Philadelphia, PA	Franklin Field	Old Dominion (2)	3–1 (3 OT)	UConn	Massachusetts	2–1 (2OT, PS)	Northwestern
1984; Details	Springfield, MA	Stagg Field	Old Dominion (3)	5–1	Iowa	Temple, UConn		
1985; Details	Norfolk, VA	Foreman Field	UConn (2)	3–2	Old Dominion	Northwestern	5–0	Boston U.
1986; Details	Norfolk, VA	Foreman Field	Iowa	2–1 (2 OT)	New Hampshire	North Carolina	4–0	Penn State
1987; Details	Chapel Hill, NC	Navy Field	Maryland	2–1 (OT)	North Carolina	Massachusetts	3–1	Iowa
1988; Details	Philadelphia, PA	Franklin Field	Old Dominion (4)	2–1	Iowa	Northeastern	1–0	Penn
1989; Details	Springfield, MA	Stagg Field	North Carolina	2–1 (3OT, PS)	Old Dominion	Northwestern	2–1	Iowa
1990; Details	Piscataway, NJ	Bauer Field	Old Dominion (5)	5–0	North Carolina	Iowa	1–0	Penn State
1991; Details	Villanova, PA	Villanova Stadium	Old Dominion (6)	2–0	North Carolina	Maryland	2–1 (OT)	Penn State
1992; Details	Richmond, VA	Cary Street Field	Old Dominion (7)	4–0	Iowa	North Carolina, Massachusetts		
1993; Details	Piscataway, NJ	Bauer Field	Maryland (2)	2–1 (2OT, PS)	North Carolina	Penn State, Iowa		
1994; Details	Brookline, MA	Parsons Field	James Madison	2–1 (2OT, PS)	North Carolina	Northwestern, Iowa		
1995; Details	Winston-Salem, NC	Kentner Stadium	North Carolina (2)	5–1	Maryland	James Madison, Northeastern		
1996; Details	Chestnut Hill, MA	Alumni Stadium	North Carolina (3)	3–0	Princeton	Old Dominion, Northeastern		
1997; Details	Storrs, CT	George J. Sherman Family-Sports Complex	North Carolina (4)	3–2	Old Dominion	·Virginia, Princeton		
1998; Details	Philadelphia, PA	Franklin Field	Old Dominion (8)	3–2	Princeton	UConn, Virginia		
1999; Details	Brookline, MA	Parsons Field	Maryland (3)	2–1	Michigan	Iowa, UConn		
2000; Details	Norfolk, VA	Foreman Field	Old Dominion (9)	3–1	North Carolina	Wake Forest, Maryland		
2001; Details	Kent, OH	Dix Stadium	Michigan	2–0	Maryland	Wake Forest, Princeton		
2002; Details	Louisville, KY	Trager Stadium	Wake Forest	2–0	Penn State	Old Dominion, Michigan State		
2003; Details	Amherst, MA	Richard F. Garber Field	Wake Forest (2)	3–1	Duke	Maryland, Michigan		
2004; Details	Winston-Salem, NC	Kentner Stadium	Wake Forest (3)	3–0	Duke	Maryland, Michigan State		
2005; Details	Louisville, KY	Trager Stadium	Maryland (4)	1–0	Duke	Old Dominion, Wake Forest		
2006; Details	Winston-Salem, NC	Kentner Stadium	Maryland (5)	1–0	Wake Forest	Duke, UConn		
2007; Details	College Park, MD	Maryland Field Hockey & Lacrosse Complex	North Carolina (5)	3–0	Penn State	UConn, Wake Forest		
2008; Details	Louisville, KY	Trager Stadium	Maryland (6)	4–2	Wake Forest	Iowa, Syracuse		
2009; Details	Winston-Salem, NC	Kentner Stadium	North Carolina (6)	3–2	Maryland	Princeton, Virginia		
2010; Details	College Park, MD	Maryland Field Hockey & Lacrosse Complex	Maryland (7)	3–2 (2OT)	North Carolina	Virginia, Ohio State		
2011; Details	Louisville, KY	Trager Stadium	Maryland (8)	3-2 (OT)	North Carolina	Old Dominion, UConn		
2012; Details	Norfolk, VA	L.R. Hill Sports Complex	Princeton	3–2	North Carolina	Maryland, Syracuse		
2013; Details	Norfolk, VA	L.R. Hill Sports Complex	UConn (3)	2–0	Duke	North Carolina, Maryland		
2014; Details	College Park, MD	Maryland Field Hockey & Lacrosse Complex	UConn (4)	1–0	Syracuse	Albany, North Carolina		
2015; Details	Ann Arbor, MI	Phyllis Ocker Field	Syracuse	4–2	North Carolina	Duke, UConn		
2016; Details	Norfolk, VA	L.R. Hill Sports Complex	Delaware	3–2	North Carolina	Princeton, UConn		
2017; Details	Louisville, KY	Trager Stadium	UConn (5)	2–1	Maryland	North Carolina, Michigan		
2018; Details	Louisville, KY	Trager Stadium	North Carolina (7)	2–0	Maryland	Wake Forest, Princeton		
2019; Details	Winston-Salem, NC	Kentner Stadium	North Carolina (8)	6–1	Princeton	Boston College, Virginia		
2020; Details	Chapel Hill, NC	Karen Shelton Stadium	North Carolina (9)	4–3 (OT)	Michigan	Iowa, Louisville		
2021; Details	Ann Arbor, MI	Phyllis Ocker Field	Northwestern	2–0	Liberty	Harvard, Maryland		
2022; Details	Storrs, CT	Sherman Complex	North Carolina (10)	2–1	Northwestern	Penn State, Maryland		
2023; Details	Chapel Hill, NC	Karen Shelton Stadium	North Carolina (11)	2–1 (2OT, PS)	Northwestern	Duke, Virginia		
2024; Details	Ann Arbor, MI	Phyllis Ocker Field	Northwestern (2)	5–0	Saint Joseph's	North Carolina, Massachusetts		
2025; Details	Durham, NC	Williams Field at Jack Katz Stadium	Northwestern (3)	2-1 (2OT)	Princeton	Harvard, North Carolina		
2026; Details	Louisville, KY	Trager Stadium	Northwestern (4)	3-1	Maryland	UConn, Harvard		
2027	Chapel Hill, NC	Karen Shelton Stadium						

== Team titles ==
NCAA National Championships by school: 11, 9, 8, 5, 4, 3, 1

Team	Number	Winning years
North Carolina	11	1989, 1995, 1996, 1997, 2007, 2009, 2018, 2019, 2020, 2022, 2023
Old Dominion	9	1982, 1983, 1984, 1988, 1990, 1991, 1992, 1998, 2000
Maryland	8	1987, 1993, 1999, 2005, 2006, 2008, 2010, 2011
UConn	5	1981, 1985, 2013, 2014, 2017
Northwestern	4	2021, 2024, 2025, 2026
Wake Forest	3	2002, 2003, 2004
Iowa	1	1986
James Madison	1	1994
Michigan	1	2001
Princeton	1	2012
Syracuse	1	2015
Delaware	1	2016

== Statistics ==
- Most Goals, Game: 10
  - Old Dominion (1984; Old Dominion–10 vs. Virginia–0)
- Most Goals, Both Teams: 13
  - Maryland (2008; Maryland–8 vs. Duke–5)
- Most Goals, Tournament: 20
  - Maryland (2008, four games)
- Goals Per Game, Tournament: 5.67
  - Old Dominion (1984)
- Fewest Goals Allowed Per Game, Tournament: 0.00
  - Old Dominion (1990, three games)
  - Old Dominion (1992, three games)
  - Wake Forest (2002, four games)
- Penalty Corners, Game: 31
  - Old Dominion (1984; vs. Virginia)

=== Individual records ===
Year	Player	Goals	Assists	Points
2006	Michelle Kasold, Wake Forest; Lauren Crandall, Wake Forest	1; 4	7; 1	9
2007	Katelyn Falgowski, North Carolina; Shaun Banta, Penn State	3; 3	1; 1	7
2008	Hilary Moore, Wake Forest	7	2	16
2009	Katie O'Donnell, Maryland	6	6	18
2010	Katie O'Donnell, Maryland	4	4	12
2011	Kelsey Kolojejchick, North Carolina	4	2	10
2012	Charlotte Craddock, North Carolina; Kathleen Sharkey, Princeton	6; 6	2; 2	14
2013	Emmie Le Marchand, Duke	5	4	14
2014	Charlotte Veitner, UConn	5	1	11
2015	Alma Fenne, Syracuse	5	2	12
2016	Greta Nauck, Delaware	4	1	9
2017	Charlotte Veitner, UConn	6	1	13
2018	Erin Matson, North Carolina	4	5	13
2019	Erin Matson, North Carolina	4	0	8
2020	Erin Matson, North Carolina	4	1	9
2021	Charlotte Vaanhold, Liberty	4	3	6
2022	Erin Matson, North Carolina	6	2	14
2023	Paityn Wirth, North Carolina	4	2	14
2024	Ashley Sessa, Northwestern	3	6	12
2025	Ashley Sessa, Northwestern; Sage Piekarski, Harvard; Beth Yeager, Princeton; Maddie Zimmer, Northwestern	2; 3; 3; 1	3; 1; 1; 5	7

- Most Goals, Single Game: 5
  - Paula Infante, Maryland (2004; Maryland–5 vs. Delaware–2)
  - Maartje van Rijswijk, Old Dominion (2012; Old Dominion–6 vs. Michigan–1)
- Most Goals, Tournament: 11
  - Marina DiGiacomo, Old Dominion (2000; four games)
- Most Assists, Game: 6
  - Cheryl Van Kuren, Old Dominion (1984; Old Dominion–10 vs. Virginia–0)
- Most Assists, Tournament: 8
  - Adrienne Yoder, Old Dominion (2000; four games)
- Saves, Game: 36
  - Missy Farwell, Virginia (1984; Virginia–2 vs. North Carolina–1)
- Fewest Goals Allowed Per Game, Tournament: 0.00
  - Kathy Fosina, Old Dominion (1990; three games)
  - Kim Decker, Old Dominion (1992; three games)
  - Katie Ridd, Wake Forest (2002; four games)
  - Sam Swenson, Michigan (2017; three games)

== Result by school and by year ==
60 teams have appeared in the NCAA Tournament in at least one year starting with 1981 (the initial year that the post-season tournament was under the auspices of the NCAA). The results for all years are shown in this table below. Conference affiliations reflect those for the upcoming 2026 season.

The code in each cell represents the furthest the team made it in the respective tournament:

- CH National Champion
- RU National Runner-up
- SF Semifinals
- QF Quarterfinals (Two teams in 1981, four teams thereafter)
- 12 , 16 Round of 16 (Only 12 teams, 1982-1998)
- • Play-In Round (Starting 2013)

School	Conference (as of 2026)	#	QF	SF	CG	CH	81	82	83	84	85	86	87	88	89	90	91	92	93	94	95	96	97	98	99	00	01	02	03	04	05	06	07	08	09	10	11	12	13	14	15	16	17	18	19	20	21	22	23	24	25	26
North Carolina	ACC	43	36	29	22	11			QF	12	QF	SF	RU	QF	CH	RU	RU	SF	RU	RU	CH	CH	CH	QF	QF	RU	16		16	QF	16	16	CH	16	CH	RU	RU	RU	SF	SF	RU	RU	SF	CH	CH	CH	16	CH	CH	SF	SF	QF
Old Dominion	Big East	33	26	17	12	9	SF	CH	CH	CH	RU	QF	QF	CH	RU	CH	CH	CH	12	QF	QF	SF	RU	CH	QF	CH	QF	SF	QF	16	SF	16	16			QF	SF	QF	16										16			16
Maryland	Big Ten	37	33	22	14	8					QF		CH	12		12	SF	QF	CH		RU	QF	QF	QF	CH	SF	RU	QF	SF	SF	CH	CH	QF	CH	RU	CH	CH	SF	SF	QF	16	QF	RU	RU	QF		SF	SF	QF	16		CG
UConn	Big East	35	28	16	7	5	CH	RU	RU	SF	CH	QF		12		12						QF	QF	SF	SF	QF		16	QF	16	QF	SF	SF	16	16	QF	SF	QF	CH	CH	SF	SF	CH	QF	QF	QF				16	QF	SF
Northwestern	Big Ten	22	19	10	6	3		QF	SF	QF	SF	QF	QF	QF	SF	QF	12		QF	SF																				16			QF		16	QF	CH	RU	RU	CH	CH	CG
Wake Forest	ACC	19	13	10	5	3																			QF	SF	SF	CH	CH	CH	SF	RU	SF	RU	QF	16			QF	16	16		16	SF				16			16	
Princeton	Ivy League	28	21	10	5	1		12												12	QF	RU	SF	RU		QF	SF	QF	16		16	QF		QF	SF	QF	16	CH	QF	16	QF	SF	QF	SF	RU			16		QF	RU	QF
Iowa	Big Ten	30	21	12	4	1		QF	QF	RU	QF	CH	SF	RU	SF	SF	QF	RU	SF	SF	QF	QF			SF					16		16	16	SF			16	16						16	QF	SF	QF	QF	16		16	16
Michigan	Big Ten	20	13	5	3	1																			RU	QF	CH	16	SF	QF	QF		QF			16	QF	16			QF	16	SF	QF	16	RU	QF	16		16		
Syracuse	ACC	20	14	4	2	1													QF		12						QF							SF	QF	QF	QF	SF	16	RU	CH	QF	16		16		QF	QF	QF	16	QF	16
James Madison	MAC	9	4	2	1	1													QF	CH	SF		12		16			16				16	QF	16																		
Delaware	MPSF	14	2	2	1	1		SF						12																16					16				16	•	16	CH	16		16	12	16	16		16		
Duke	ACC	22	18	7	4	-												QF				12			16			QF	RU	RU	RU	SF	16	QF			QF		RU	QF	SF	QF	QF	QF	16				SF	QF	QF	QF
Penn State	Big Ten	35	21	8	2	-		SF	QF	12	12	SF	12	QF	12	SF	SF	QF	SF	QF	QF	12	QF	QF	16	16		RU	QF		16	QF	RU	16		16	QF	QF	16	QF		16	QF	16			16	SF				
UMass	MAC	28	13	5	1	-	RU	12	SF	12	12	12	SF	QF	QF	QF	12	SF	QF			12	12	12	QF	QF	16						16	16		16		16	QF		16	16								SF		QF
New Hampshire	America East	11	3	1	1	-			12	QF	QF	RU	12		12									12		16											16		16												16	
Saint Joseph's	Atlantic 10	9	2	1	1	-																																					16	16	16		16	QF	16	RU	16	16
Liberty	Big East	6	1	1	1	-																																	•	16							RU	16	16		16	
Virginia	ACC	29	15	6	-	-		12		QF	12		12					12			12	QF	SF	SF	16	16	QF					QF	16	QF	SF	SF		QF	16		QF	QF	16	16	SF		16	16	SF	QF	16	
Northeastern	CAA	16	8	3	-	-								SF	QF	QF	QF	12		12	SF	SF	12	12			16	QF	16	QF							16	16														
Harvard	Ivy League	11	6	3	-	-											12									16		16		16												16		QF			SF		QF	QF	SF	SF
Michigan State	Big Ten	9	7	2	-	-																					QF	SF	QF	SF			16	QF	QF	16			QF													
Temple	Big East	6	5	1	-	-		QF	QF	SF						QF	QF	12																																		
Boston College	ACC	13	4	1	-	-														QF			12	QF					16	16	16				16				16	16	QF	16			SF					16		
Boston University	Patriot	15	3	1	-	-					SF				12		QF		12			12			16	16					16	16	QF							16	16		16	•							•	
Louisville	ACC	11	3	1	-	-																							16					16						16	16	16	16		QF	SF	16	16	QF			
Ohio State	Big Ten	7	2	1	-	-														12							16				16	QF			16	SF	16															
Albany	America East	7	2	1	-	-																												16		16		16		SF	16			16				QF				
Penn	Ivy League	5	2	1	-	-			12			12		SF	QF				12																																	
Long Beach State	defunct	1	1	1	-	-	SF																																													
Rutgers	Big Ten	5	3	-	-	-				QF		QF																																16			QF		16			
Ball State	MAC	4	3	-	-	-												QF		QF	12		QF																													
Stanford	ACC	18	2	-	-	-					12	12	12			12	12				12					16							16		16	16	16	16		QF	16	16	•		16	QF						
American	Patriot	12	2	-	-	-																							16	QF	QF	16		16	16	16			16			16			•		16		16			
Providence	Big East	3	2	-	-	-							QF		QF	12																																				
California	ACC	11	1	-	-	-		QF	12									12	12	12							16	16	16		16	16																	•			
Miami (OH)	MAC	11	1	-	-	-																																	•				16	16	•	12	16	16	16	16	QF	16
San Jose State	defunct	4	1	-	-	-	QF	12	12	12																																										
Drexel	CAA	3	1	-	-	-																													QF			16													•	
Chico State	defunct	2	1	-	-	-						12	QF																																							
Indiana	Big Ten	2	1	-	-	-																									QF				16																	
Purdue	defunct	1	1	-	-	-	QF																																													
Bucknell	Patriot	1	1	-	-	-																																								QF						
Kent State	MAC	8	-	-	-	-																		12	16	16	16	16												16	•	•										
Fairfield	CAA	8	-	-	-	-																					16														•		•		16		•			•	16	•
Richmond	Atlantic 10	8	-	-	-	-																						16	16	16	16	16			16		16			•												
Lafayette	Patriot	4	-	-	-	-																			16													16												16		16
William & Mary	CAA	4	-	-	-	-																				16		16																16					16			
Ohio	MAC	3	-	-	-	-																					16						16				16															
Monmouth	CAA	3	-	-	-	-																																		•		•		•								
Pacific	defunct	2	-	-	-	-									12															16																						
Rider	NEC	2	-	-	-	-																																								12		•				
Vermont	America East	2	-	-	-	-																																												•		•
Yale	Ivy League	2	-	-	-	-																																													16	16
West Chester	Division II	1	-	-	-	-								12																																						
Brown	Ivy League	1	-	-	-	-																			16																											
Quinnipiac	NEC	1	-	-	-	-																																	•													
VCU	Atlantic 10	1	-	-	-	-																																								12						
Maine	America East	1	-	-	-	-																																									•					
Lehigh	Patriot	1	-	-	-	-																																										•				
Sacred Heart	NEC	1	-	-	-	-																																											•			
Wagner	NEC	1	-	-	-	-																																														16

== All-time record ==
- Note: as of end of 2025 championship
- school indicates schools belong to Division II.
- school indicates schools that no longer sponsor field hockey.
- **School** indicates they have win at least one championship.
- Other **bold** indicates most in respective column.

Team	App	C	F	3	4	GP	W	L	T	GF	GA	GD	Notes
Albany	7	0	0	1	0	10	2	7	1	11	17	-6	
American	12	0	0	0	0	16	4	11	1	20	47	-27	
Ball State	4	0	0	0	0	7	3	4	0	14	18	-4	
Boston College	13	0	0	1	0	18	4	13	1	23	51	-28	
Boston University	15	0	0	0	1	22	6	15	1	32	43	-11	
Brown	1	0	0	0	0	1	0	1	0	0	6	-6	
Bucknell	1	0	0	0	0	2	1	1	0	2	3	-1	
California	11	0	0	0	0	12	1	9	2	10	29	-19	
Chico State	1	0	0	0	0	1	0	1	0	0	3	-3	No longer sponsors field hockey
**Connecticut**	33	5	2	**8**	0	77	44	27	6	162	116	46	Two consecutive champion
**Delaware**	14	1	0	1	0	24	11	13	0	45	64	-19	
Drexel	3	0	0	0	0	4	1	3	0	3	14	-11	
Duke	21	0	4	3	0	49	28	20	1	112	94	18	
Fairfield	7	0	0	0	0	9	2	6	1	11	28	-17	
Harvard	10	0	0	2	0	17	7	10	0	32	40	-8	
Indiana	2	0	0	0	0	3	1	2	0	3	9	-6	
**Iowa**	29	1	3	6	2	60	29	27	4	110	94	16	
**James Madison**	9	1	0	1	0	14	5	8	1	17	22	-5	
Kent State	8	0	0	0	0	9	1	8	0	14	28	-14	
Lafayette	3	0	0	0	0	3	0	3	0	0	9	-9	
Lehigh	1	0	0	0	0	1	0	1	0	0	4	-4	
Liberty	6	0	1	0	0	10	4	4	2	16	15	1	
Long Beach State	1	0	0	0	1	3	1	1	1	3	3	0	
Louisville	11	0	0	1	0	12	1	10	1	10	26	-16	
Maine	1	0	0	0	0	1	0	1	0	2	3	-1	
**Maryland**	36	8	5	**8**	0	97	65	27	5	238	153	85	Two consecutive champion (twice)
Massachusetts	27	0	1	4	0	45	15	26	4	63	94	-31	
Miami (OH)	10	0	0	0	0	17	7	9	1	35	41	-6	
**Michigan**	20	1	2	2	0	40	21	17	2	82	82	0	
Michigan State	9	0	0	2	0	19	9	9	1	41	35	6	
Monmouth	3	0	0	0	0	3	0	3	0	8	11	-3	
New Hampshire	11	0	1	0	0	13	2	11	0	18	44	-26	
**North Carolina**	**42**	**11**	**11**	7	0	**116**	**81**	26	**9**	**318**	**165**	**153**	Three consecutive champion (twice), two consecutive champion
Northeastern	16	0	0	3	0	28	12	15	1	38	53	-15	
**Northwestern**	21	3	2	3	1	51	25	18	8	97	66	31	Two consecutive chmapion
Ohio	3	0	0	0	0	3	0	3	0	1	7	-6	
Ohio State	7	0	0	1	0	10	3	7	0	15	29	-14	
**Old Dominion**	32	9	3	5	0	73	49	22	2	224	125	99	Three consecutive champion (twice)
Pacific	2	0	0	0	0	2	0	2	0	2	5	-3	
Penn	5	0	0	0	1	8	2	5	1	8	16	-8	
Penn State	34	0	2	2	**4**	66	25	**38**	3	105	127	-22	
**Princeton**	27	1	4	5	0	62	36	25	1	157	147	10	
Providence	3	0	0	0	0	4	1	3	0	5	12	-7	
Purdue	1	0	0	0	0	1	0	1	0	1	2	-1	
Quinnipiac	1	0	0	0	0	1	0	1	0	1	3	-2	
Richmond	8	0	0	0	0	8	0	8	0	4	28	-24	
Rider	2	0	0	0	0	2	0	2	0	1	12	-11	
Rutgers	5	0	0	0	0	8	2	5	1	12	20	-8	
Sacred Heart	1	0	0	0	0	1	0	1	0	0	4	-4	
Saint Joseph's	8	0	1	0	0	13	5	8	0	15	29	-14	
San Jose State	4	0	0	0	0	4	0	4	0	4	11	-7	
Stanford	18	0	0	0	0	21	3	18	0	18	71	-53	
**Syracuse**	19	1	1	2	0	39	20	17	2	92	83	9	
Temple	6	0	0	1	0	10	4	6	0	15	22	-7	
VCU	1	0	0	0	0	1	0	1	0	1	2	-1	
Vermont	1	0	0	0	0	1	0	1	0	1	2	-1	
Virginia	29	0	0	6	0	49	18	28	3	97	117	-20	
**Wake Forest**	19	3	2	5	0	47	31	17	0	126	81	45	Three consecutive champion
West Chester	2	0	0	0	0	3	1	1	1	4	3	1	
William & Mary	4	0	0	0	0	6	2	4	0	11	17	-6	
Yale	1	0	0	0	0	1	0	1	0	1	5	-4	

== See also ==
- NCAA Division II field hockey tournament
- NCAA Division III field hockey tournament
- AIAW field hockey tournament
- USA Field Hockey Hall of Fame
