= 2009 NCAA Division I field hockey tournament =

Tournament details
- Host country: United States
- City: Winston-Salem, North Carolina
- Dates: November 14–22, 2009
- Venue: Kentner Stadium

Final positions
- Champions: North Carolina (6th title)
- Runner-up: Maryland (9th title game)

Tournament statistics
- Matches played: 15
- Goals scored: 88 (5.87 per match)
- Top scorer(s): Katie O'Donnell, Maryland (6 goals)

The 2009 NCAA Division I field hockey tournament was the 29th annual tournament organized by the National Collegiate Athletic Association to determine the national champion of women's collegiate field hockey among its Division I members in the United States.

North Carolina won their sixth championship, defeating defending champions Maryland in the final, 3–2.

The semifinals and championship were hosted by Wake Forest University at Kentner Stadium in Winston-Salem, North Carolina.

== Qualifying ==
Drexel made their debut in the NCAA Division I field hockey tournament.

== Bracket ==
First round November 14; Campus sites
1	Maryland	6
American	1
Drexel	3
Connecticut	2
Syracuse	6
Boston College	2
4	Princeton	4
Stanford	0
3	North Carolina	4
Ohio State	1
Wake Forest	2
Indiana	0
Michigan State	7
Delaware	0
2	Virginia	3
Richmond	0

Second round November 15; Campus sites
1	Maryland	5
Drexel	0
Syracuse	3
4	Princeton	7
3	North Carolina	4
Wake Forest	1
Michigan State	2
2	Virginia	3*

Semifinals; November 20; Winston-Salem, NC
1	Maryland	7
4	Princeton	5
3	North Carolina	3
2	Virginia	2

Championship; November 22; Winston-Salem, NC
1	Maryland	2
3	North Carolina	3

== See also ==
- 2009 NCAA Division II field hockey tournament
- 2009 NCAA Division III field hockey tournament
