= 2011 NCAA Division I field hockey tournament =

Tournament details
- Host country: United States
- City: Louisville, Kentucky
- Dates: November 12–20, 2011
- Venue: Trager Stadium

Final positions
- Champions: Maryland (8th title)
- Runner-up: North Carolina (14th title game)

Tournament statistics
- Matches played: 15
- Goals scored: 70 (4.67 per match)
- Top scorer(s): Kelsey Kolojejchick, North Carolina (4 goals)

The 2011 NCAA Division I field hockey tournament was the 31st annual tournament organized by the National Collegiate Athletic Association to determine the national champion of women's collegiate field hockey among its Division I members in the United States.

Defending champions Maryland Terrapins won their seventh championship, defeating North Carolina Tar Heels in the final, 3–2 in one overtime. This was a rematch of the previous two years' finals, won by the Tar Heels in 2009 and the Terrapins in 2010.

The semifinals and championship were hosted by the University of Louisville at Trager Stadium in Louisville, Kentucky from November 18–20.

== Qualifying ==
No teams made their debut in the NCAA Division I field hockey tournament this year.

== Bracket ==
First round November 12; Campus sites
1	North Carolina	4
Ohio	0
Michigan	5
New Hampshire	4
Penn State	1
Northeastern	0
4	Connecticut	3
Princeton	2
3	Syracuse	2
Richmond	0
Maryland	4
Iowa	2
Duke	5
Stanford	0
2	Old Dominion	5
Ohio State	0

Second round November 13; Campus sites
1	North Carolina	5
Michigan	1
Penn State	2
4	Connecticut	3
3	Syracuse	1
Maryland	2*
Duke	1
2	Old Dominion	2

Semifinals; November 18; Louisville, KY
1	North Carolina	4**
4	Connecticut	3
Maryland	4
2	Old Dominion	0

Championship; November 20; Louisville, KY
1	North Carolina	2
Maryland	3*

== See also ==
- 2011 NCAA Division II field hockey tournament
- 2011 NCAA Division III field hockey tournament
