= 2018 NCAA Division I field hockey tournament =

2018 NCAA Division I Field Hockey Championship
Tournament details
- Country: United States
- Teams: 18

Final positions
- Champions: North Carolina (7th title)
- Runners-up: Maryland (13th title match)

Tournament statistics
- Matches played: 17
- Goals scored: 63 (3.71 per match)

Awards
- Best player: Ashley Hoffman

The 2018 NCAA Division I Field Hockey Championship is the 38th annual tournament organized by the NCAA, to determine the national champion of Division I women's college field hockey in the United States.

The semifinals and championship match will be played at Trager Stadium at the University of Louisville in Louisville, Kentucky from November 16 to 18, 2018.

== Qualified teams ==
- A total of 18 teams will qualify for the 2018 tournament, the same number of teams as 2017. 10 teams will receive automatic bids by winning their conference tournaments and an additional 8 teams will earn at-large bids based on their regular season records.

=== Automatic qualifiers ===
Conference	Champion	Record
America East	Albany	16-4
ACC	North Carolina	19-0
Atlantic 10	Saint Joseph's	18-2
Big East	Connecticut	18-3
Big Ten	Maryland	19-2
CAA	William & Mary	11-7
Ivy	Harvard	16-1
MAAC	Monmouth	13-6
MAC	Miami (OH)	15-6
Patriot	Boston University	12-7

=== At-large qualifiers ===
Team	Conference	Record
Duke	ACC	15-5
Iowa	Big Ten	14-6
Michigan	Big Ten	13-6
Penn State	Big Ten	12-5
Princeton	Ivy	13-4
Rutgers	Big Ten	13-5
Virginia	ACC	9-9
Wake Forest	ACC	11-9

== Bracket ==
Opening round November 7, 2018; Campus sites
William & Mary*	3
Monmouth	2
Boston University*	0
Miami (OH)	2

First round November 9, 2018; Campus sites
1	North Carolina*	4
William & Mary	0
Saint Joseph's	2
Michigan*	3
Iowa*	2
Wake Forest	3
Miami (OH)	0
4	Duke*	1
3	Princeton*	2
Virginia	1
Harvard	6
Penn State*	1
Connecticut*	5
Rutgers	0
Albany	1
2	Maryland*	2

Second round November 11, 2018; Campus sites
1	North Carolina	5
Michigan	3
Wake Forest	1*
4	Duke	0
3	Princeton	2
Harvard	1
Connecticut	1
2	Maryland	2*

Semifinals; November 16, 2018; Louisville, Kentucky; Trager Stadium
1	North Carolina	4
Wake Forest	1
3	Princeton	0
2	Maryland	1*

Championship; November 18, 2018; Louisville, Kentucky; Trager Stadium
1	North Carolina	2
2	Maryland	0

== See also ==
- NCAA Division II Field Hockey Championship
- NCAA Division III Field Hockey Championship
