= 2012 NCAA Division I field hockey tournament =

Tournament details
- Host country: United States
- City: Norfolk, Virginia
- Dates: November 10–18, 2012
- Venue: L.R. Hill Sports Complex

Final positions
- Champions: Princeton (1st title)
- Runner-up: North Carolina (15th title game)

Tournament statistics
- Matches played: 15
- Goals scored: 74 (4.93 per match)
- Top scorer(s): (United Kingdom) Charlotte Craddock, UNC and Kathleen Sharkey, PU (6 goals)

The 2012 NCAA Division I field hockey tournament was the 32nd annual tournament organized by the National Collegiate Athletic Association to determine the national champion of women's collegiate field hockey among its Division I members in the United States.

Princeton won their first championship, defeating North Carolina in the final, 3–2.

The championship was played at the L.R. Hill Sports Complex on the home field of the host Old Dominion Lady Monarchs in Norfolk, Virginia from November 16–18.

== Qualifying ==
No teams made their debut in the NCAA Division I field hockey tournament this year.

== Bracket ==
First round November 10; Campus sites
1	North Carolina	4
Stanford	1
Old Dominion	6
Michigan	1
Syracuse	4
Massachusetts	2
4	Penn State	2
Albany	1
3	Connecticut	2**
Northeastern	1
Maryland	2
Lafayette	0
Virginia	3
Iowa	2
2	Princeton	5
Drexel	0

Second round November 11; Campus sites
1	North Carolina	3
Old Dominion	1
Syracuse	5
4	Penn State	2
3	Connecticut	1
Maryland	2
Virginia	2
2	Princeton	5

Semifinals; November 16; Norfolk, VA
1	North Carolina	6
Syracuse	1
Maryland	2
2	Princeton	3*

Championship; November 18; Norfolk, VA
1	North Carolina	2
2	Princeton	3

== See also ==
- 2012 NCAA Division II field hockey tournament
- 2012 NCAA Division III field hockey tournament
