= 2008 NCAA Division I field hockey tournament =

Tournament details
- Host country: United States
- City: Louisville, Kentucky
- Dates: November 15–23, 2008
- Venue: Trager Stadium

Final positions
- Champions: Maryland (6th title)
- Runner-up: Wake Forest (5th title game)

Tournament statistics
- Matches played: 15
- Goals scored: 73 (4.87 per match)
- Top scorer(s): Hilary Moore, Wake Forest (7 goals)

The 2008 NCAA Division I field hockey tournament was the 28th annual tournament organized by the National Collegiate Athletic Association to determine the national champion of women's collegiate field hockey among its Division I members in the United States.

Maryland won their sixth championship, defeating Wake Forest in the final, 4–2.

The semifinals and championship were hosted by the University of Louisville at Trager Stadium in Louisville, Kentucky from November 21–23.

== Qualifying ==
Albany made their debut in the NCAA Division I field hockey tournament.

== Bracket ==
First round November 15; Campus sites
1	Maryland	4
Albany	2
Duke	2
Connecticut	1
Michigan State	3
North Carolina	2
4	Iowa	1
Louisville	0
3	Syracuse	3
Massachusetts	2
Princeton	2
Penn State	0
Virginia	2
James Madison	1
2	Wake Forest	7
American	1

Second round November 16; Campus sites
1	Maryland	8
Duke	5
Michigan State	0
4	Iowa	1
3	Syracuse	3*
Princeton	2
Virginia	3
2	Wake Forest	4

Semifinals; November 21; Louisville, KY
1	Maryland	2*
4	Iowa	1
3	Syracuse	2
2	Wake Forest	3*

Championship; November 23; Louisville, KY
1	Maryland	4
2	Wake Forest	2

== See also ==
- 2008 NCAA Division II field hockey tournament
- 2008 NCAA Division III field hockey tournament
