= 2002 NCAA Division I field hockey tournament =

Tournament details
- Host country: United States
- City: Louisville, Kentucky
- Dates: November 16–24, 2002
- Venue: Trager Stadium

Final positions
- Champions: Wake Forest (1st title)
- Runner-up: Penn State (1st title game)

Tournament statistics
- Matches played: 15
- Goals scored: 65 (4.33 per match)

The 2002 NCAA Division I field hockey tournament was the 22nd annual tournament organized by the National Collegiate Athletic Association to determine the national champion of women's collegiate field hockey among its Division I members in the United States.

Wake Forest won their first championship, defeating Penn State in the final, 2–0.

The semifinals and championship were played at Trager Stadium in Louisville, Kentucky, hosted by the University of Louisville.

As of 2025, this is the only time North Carolina has not qualified for the tournament.

== Qualifying ==
One team made their debut in the NCAA Division I field hockey tournament: Richmond.

== Bracket ==
First round November 16; Campus sites
1	Old Dominion	5
Richmond	1
Maryland	2*
William & Mary	1
Princeton	4
4	Michigan	3
Penn State	3
Kent State	2
3	Michigan State	4
Harvard	3
Northeastern	1
Connecticut	0
2	Wake Forest	8
California	0
Duke	2
James Madison	1

Second round November 17; Campus sites
1	Old Dominion	4
Maryland	1
Princeton	2
Penn State	3
3	Michigan State	1†
Northeastern	1
2	Wake Forest	2
Duke	0

Semifinals; November 22; Louisville, KY
1	Old Dominion	2
Penn State	3
3	Michigan State	0
2	Wake Forest	3

Championship; November 24; Louisville, KY
Penn State	0
2	Wake Forest	2

== See also ==
- 2002 NCAA Division II field hockey tournament
- 2002 NCAA Division III field hockey tournament
