= 1994 NCAA Division I field hockey tournament =

Tournament details
- Host country: United States
- City: Boston, Massachusetts
- Dates: November 10–20, 1994
- Teams: 12
- Venue: Parsons Field

Final positions
- Champions: James Madison (1st title)
- Runner-up: North Carolina

Tournament statistics
- Matches played: 11
- Goals scored: 41 (3.73 per match)

The 1994 NCAA Division I field hockey tournament was the 14th annual single-elimination tournament hosted by the National Collegiate Athletic Association to determine the national champion of women's collegiate field hockey among its Division I members in the United States, the culmination of the 1994 NCAA Division I field hockey season.

James Madison won their first championship, defeating North Carolina in the final, 2–1 after two overtime periods and a penalty stroke shoot-out.

The championship rounds were held at Parsons Field on the campus of Northeastern University in Brookline, Massachusetts.

Two teams made their first appearances in the NCAA Division I field hockey tournament: Boston College and Ohio State.

== Qualifying ==
| Team | Record | Appearance | Previous |
|---|---|---|---|
| Ball State | 18–1–2 | 2nd | 1992 |
| Boston College | 14–5–2 | 1st | Never |
| California | 7–5–1 | 5th | 1993 |
| Iowa | 13–7 | 13th | 1993 |
| James Madison | 17–3–1 | 2nd | 1993 |
| North Carolina | 19–1 | 12th | 1993 |
| Northeastern | 16–4–1 | 6th | 1992 |
| Northwestern | 14–3–2 | 12th | 1993 |
| Ohio State | 14–6 | 1st | Never |
| Old Dominion | 17–5–1 | 14th | 1993 |
| Penn State | 12–6–2 | 13th | 1993 |
| Princeton | 12–3 | 2nd | 1982 |

== Bracket ==
First round November 10; Campus sites
Boston College | 3
Northeastern* | 2
Iowa* | 3
California | 2
Ball State* | 3
Ohio State | 0
Penn State* | 5
Princeton | 0

Second round November 13; Campus sites
North Carolina* | 5
Boston College | 0
Old Dominion* | 2
Iowa | 3*
Northwestern* | 2
Ball State | 1
James Madison* | 1**
Penn State | 0

Semifinals; November 19; Boston, MA
North Carolina | 4
Iowa | 1
Northwestern | 0
James Madison | 1

Championship; November 20; Boston, MA
North Carolina | 1
James Madison | 2**†

- * indicates overtime period
- † indicates penalty shoot-out

== See also ==
- 1994 NCAA Division II field hockey tournament
- 1994 NCAA Division III field hockey tournament
