= 2006 NCAA Division I field hockey tournament =

Tournament details
- Host country: United States
- City: (North Carolina) Winston-Salem, NC
- Dates: November 11–19, 2006
- Venue: Kentner Stadium

Final positions
- Champions: Maryland (5th title)
- Runner-up: Wake Forest (4th title game)

Tournament statistics
- Matches played: 15
- Goals scored: 58 (3.87 per match)
- Top scorer(s): Lauren Crandall, Wake Forest (4 goals)

The 2006 NCAA Division I field hockey tournament was the 26th annual tournament organized by the National Collegiate Athletic Association to determine the national champion of women's collegiate field hockey among its Division I members in the United States.

Maryland won their fifth championship, defeating Wake Forest in the final, 1–0.

The semifinals and championship were held at Kentner Stadium in Winston-Salem, North Carolina, hosted by Wake Forest University.

== Qualifying ==
No teams made their debut in the NCAA Division I field hockey tournament.

== Bracket ==
First round November 11; Campus sites
1	Wake Forest	4
American	0
Virginia	1
Iowa	0
Ohio State (OT)	3
California	1
4	Duke	3*
James Madison	2
Princeton	3*
3	Old Dominion	2
Connecticut	3
Boston University	0
Penn State	4
North Carolina	3
2	Maryland	4
Richmond	0

Second round November 12; Campus sites
1	Wake Forest	3
Virginia	2
Ohio State	0
4	Duke	3
Princeton	0
Connecticut	3
Penn State	0
2	Maryland	1

Semifinals; November 17; Winston-Salem, NC
1	Wake Forest	5**
4	Duke	4
Connecticut	1
2	Maryland	2†

Championship; November 19; Winston-Salem, NC
1	Wake Forest	0
2	Maryland	1

== See also ==
- 2006 NCAA Division II field hockey tournament
- 2006 NCAA Division III field hockey tournament
