= 2010 NCAA Division I field hockey tournament =

Tournament details
- Host country: United States
- City: College Park, Maryland
- Dates: November 13–21, 2010
- Venue: Maryland Field Hockey & Lacrosse Complex

Final positions
- Champions: Maryland (7th title)
- Runner-up: North Carolina (13th title game)

Tournament statistics
- Matches played: 15
- Goals scored: 68 (4.53 per match)
- Top scorer(s): Katie O'Donnell, Maryland (4 goals)

The 2010 NCAA Division I field hockey tournament was the 30th annual tournament organized by the National Collegiate Athletic Association to determine the national champion of women's collegiate field hockey among its Division I members in the United States.

Hosts Maryland won their seventh championship, defeating defending champions North Carolina in the final, 3–2 in two overtimes. This was additionally a rematch of the previous year's final.

The semifinals and championship were hosted by the University of Maryland at the Maryland Field Hockey & Lacrosse Complex in College Park, Maryland from November 19–21.

== Qualifying ==
No teams made their debut in the NCAA Division I field hockey tournament this year.

== Bracket ==
First round November 13; Campus sites
1	Maryland	4
Massachusetts	2
Connecticut	3**†
American	2
Ohio State	2
Albany	1
4	Syracuse	2*
Penn State	1
3	Virginia	3*
Michigan State	2
Princeton	3
Wake Forest	1
Old Dominion	1
Michigan	0
2	North Carolina	3
Stanford	1

Second round November 14; Campus sites
1	Maryland	3
Connecticut	1
Ohio State	3
4	Syracuse	2
3	Virginia	4
Princeton	2
Old Dominion	1
2	North Carolina	5

Semifinals; November 19; College Park, MD
1	Maryland	3
Ohio State	1
3	Virginia	3
2	North Carolina	4*

Championship; November 21; College Park, MD
1	Maryland	3**
2	North Carolina	2

== See also ==
- 2010 NCAA Division II field hockey tournament
- 2010 NCAA Division III field hockey tournament
