= 2021 NCAA Division I field hockey tournament =

2021 NCAA Division I Field Hockey Championship
Tournament details
- Country: United States
- Teams: 18

Final positions
- Champions: Northwestern (1st title)
- Runners-up: Liberty (1st title match)

Tournament statistics
- Matches played: 17
- Goals scored: 58 (3.41 per match)

The 2021 NCAA Division I Field Hockey Championship was the 41st annual tournament organized by the NCAA, to determine the national champion of Division I women's college field hockey in the United States.

The semifinals and championship match were played at the Phyllis Ocker Field at the University of Michigan in Ann Arbor, Michigan on November 19 and 21, 2021.

Maine made their debut appearance in the national championship tournament.

Northwestern won their first NCAA title, and the school's ninth national title across all sports. During the tournament, they faced three-time defending national champion North Carolina, #2 seed Iowa, top scoring defense Harvard, and top scoring offense Liberty.

== Qualified teams ==
- A total of 18 teams qualified for the 2021 tournament, a return to the pre-COVID pandemic format from 2019. 10 teams received automatic bids by winning their conference tournaments and an additional 8 teams earned at-large bids based on their regular season records.

=== Automatic qualifiers ===
Conference	Champion	Record	Appearance	Last
America East	Maine	15-6	1st	—
ACC	North Carolina	13-6	38th	2020
Atlantic 10	Saint Joseph's	16-4	4th	2019
Big East	Liberty	17-2	3rd	2014
Big Ten	Rutgers	18-3	4th	2018
CAA	Delaware	12-8	12th	2020
Ivy	Harvard	15-1	7th	2018
Mid-American	Miami (OH)	11-10	6th	2020
Northeast	Fairfield	14-7	5th	2019
Patriot	American	13-3	11th	2016

=== At-large qualifiers ===
Team	Conference	Record	Appearance	Last
Iowa	Big Ten	16-2	26th	2020
Louisville	ACC	16-3	9th	2020
Maryland	Big Ten	13-6	33rd	2019
Michigan	Big Ten	15-4	18th	2020
Northwestern	Big Ten	14-5	17th	2020
Penn State	Big Ten	14-5	34th	2018
Syracuse	ACC	13-5	15th	2019
Virginia	ACC	12-8	25th	2019

== Bracket ==
Opening round November 10, 2021; Campus sites
Fairfield	3
Delaware	4
Maine	2
Miami (OH)	3

First round November 12, 2021; Campus sites
1	Rutgers	2
Delaware	1
Liberty	2
Saint Joseph's	0
Maryland	2
Virginia	1
4	Penn State	1
Syracuse	4
3	Michigan	3
Miami (OH)	2
Louisville	0
Harvard	1
Northwestern	2
North Carolina	0
American	2
2	Iowa	3

Second round November 14, 2021; Campus sites
1	Rutgers	2
Liberty	3
Maryland	2
Syracuse	1
3	Michigan	0
Harvard	1
Northwestern	1
2	Iowa	0

Semifinals; November 19, 2021; Ann Arbor, Michigan; Phyllis Ocker Field
Liberty	3
Maryland	2
Harvard	1
Northwestern	2

Championship; November 21, 2021; Ann Arbor, Michigan; Phyllis Ocker Field
Liberty	0
Northwestern	2

== See also ==
- NCAA Division II Field Hockey Championship
- NCAA Division III Field Hockey Championship
