= 2026 NCAA Division I Field Hockey Championship =

Tournament details
- Country: United States
- Venue(s): Trager Stadium; Louisville, KY
- Dates: November 20-22, 2026
- Teams: 18

Tournament statistics
- Matches played: 17

The 2026 NCAA Division I Field Hockey Championship is the 46th women's collegiate field hockey tournament organized by the NCAA, to determine the national champion of Division I women's college field hockey in the United States.

The semifinals and championship match will be played at Trager Stadium at the University of Louisville in Louisville, Kentucky from November 20–22.

== Qualified teams ==
=== Automatic qualifiers ===
Conference	Champion	Record	Appearance	Last
America East	Vermont	14-5	2nd	2024
ACC	Syracuse	12-6	20th	2025
Atlantic 10	Saint Joseph's	11-9	9th	2025
Big East	Old Dominion	15-4	33rd	2023
Big Ten	Northwestern	18-2	22nd	2025
CAA	Fairfield	12-7	8th	2025
Ivy	Yale	14–3	2nd	2025
Mid-American	Miami (OH)	15–4	11th	2025
NEC	Wagner	11-7	1st	-
Patriot	Lafayette	17-2	4th	2024

=== At-large qualifiers ===
Team	Conference	Record	Appearance	Last
Duke	ACC	12-5	22nd	2025
North Carolina	ACC	12-7	43rd	2025
UConn	Big East	15-2	23rd	2025
Iowa	Big Ten	13-5	30th	2025
Maryland	Big Ten	18-2	37th	2024
Harvard	Ivy	15-2	11th	2025
Princeton	Ivy	13-5	28th	2025
UMass	MAC	18-2	28th	2024

== Bracket ==
Opening Round; November 11, 2026; Campus Sites
Saint Joseph's	1 (4 PSO)
Vermont	1 (3)
Fairfield	0
Wagner	1

First Round; November 13, 2026; Campus Sites
1	Northwestern*	5
Saint Joseph's	0
Miami (OH)	0
8	North Carolina	1
5	Princeton	4
Syracuse	0
Lafayette	1
4	UConn*	2
3	Harvard*	4
Old Dominion	0
UMass	1
6	Yale	0
7	Iowa	2
Duke	3
Wagner	1
2	Maryland*	8

Second Round; November 15, 2026; Campus Sites
1	Northwestern	0 (4 PSO)
8	North Carolina	0 (3)
5	Princeton	0 (2 PSO)
4	UConn	0 (4)
3	Harvard	1
UMass	0
Duke	1
2	Maryland	2

Semifinals; November 20, 2026; Louisville, Kentucky; Trager Stadium
1	Northwestern	2 (5 PSO)
4	UConn	2 (4)
3	Harvard	0
2	Maryland	1

Championship; November 22, 2026; Louisville, Kentucky; Trager Stadium
1	Northwestern
2	Maryland

== See also ==
- NCAA Division II field hockey tournament
- NCAA Division III field hockey tournament
