= 2016 NCAA Division I field hockey tournament =

2016 NCAA Division I Field Hockey Championship
Tournament details
- Country: United States
- Teams: 18

Final positions
- Champions: Delaware (1st title)
- Runners-up: North Carolina (17th title match)

Tournament statistics
- Matches played: 17
- Goals scored: 68 (4 per match)

The 2016 NCAA Division I Field Hockey Championship was the 36th annual women's collegiate field hockey tournament organized by the NCAA, to determine the national champion of Division I college field hockey in the United States. The semifinals and championship match were played at the L.R. Hill Sports Complex at Old Dominion University in Norfolk, Virginia from November 18th through 20th, 2016.

Delaware defeated North Carolina in the final, 3–2, to win their first national title.

== Qualified teams ==
- A total of 18 teams qualified for the 2016 tournament, the same number of teams as 2015. 10 teams received automatic bids by winning their conference tournaments and an additional 8 teams earned at-large bids based on their regular season records.

=== Automatic qualifiers ===
Conference	Champion	Record
America East	Stanford	13–6
ACC	Virginia	15–7
Atlantic 10	Massachusetts	13–7
Big East	Connecticut	20–1
Big Ten	Penn State	17–2
CAA	Delaware	19–2
Ivy	Harvard	12–5
MAAC	Monmouth	17–2
MAC	Kent State	14–6
Patriot	American	13–6

=== At-large qualifiers ===
Team	Conference	Record
Boston College	ACC	10–9
Duke	ACC	15–3
Louisville	ACC	15–5
Maryland	Big Ten	17–4
Michigan	Big Ten	12–7
North Carolina	ACC	17–5
Princeton	Ivy	10–7
Syracuse	ACC	14–3

== Bracket ==
Play-In round November 9, 2016; Campus sites
American*	2
Kent State	1
Monmouth*	3
Massachusetts	4

First round November 12, 2016; Campus sites
1	Duke*	3
American	0
Louisville	0
Delaware*	1
Virginia*	2
Michigan	1
Princeton	2
4	Penn State*	1
3	Syracuse*	5
Harvard	1
Boston College	0
Connecticut*	5
North Carolina*	3
Stanford	0
Massachusetts	1
2	Maryland*	2

Second round November 13, 2016; Campus sites
1	Duke	2
Delaware	3
Virginia	2
Princeton	3
3	Syracuse	2
Connecticut	3
North Carolina	3
2	Maryland	0

Semifinals; November 18, 2016; Norfolk, Virginia; L.R. Hill Complex
Delaware	3
Princeton	2
Connecticut	1
North Carolina(OT)	2

Championship; November 20, 2016; Norfolk, Virginia; L.R. Hill Complex
Delaware	3
North Carolina	2

== See also ==
- NCAA Division II Field Hockey Championship
- NCAA Division III Field Hockey Championship
