= 1986 NCAA Division I field hockey tournament =

Tournament details
- Host country: United States
- City: Norfolk, Virginia
- Dates: November 15–23, 1986
- Teams: 12
- Venue: Foreman Field

Final positions
- Champions: Iowa (1st title)
- Runner-up: New Hampshire
- Third place: North Carolina

Tournament statistics
- Matches played: 11
- Goals scored: 33 (3 per match)

The 1986 NCAA Division I field hockey tournament was the sixth annual single-elimination tournament hosted by the National Collegiate Athletic Association to determine the national champion of women's collegiate field hockey among its Division I members in the United States, the culmination of the 1986 NCAA Division I field hockey season.

Iowa won their first championship, defeating New Hampshire in the final.

The championship rounds were held at Foreman Field in Norfolk, Virginia for the second straight year.

== Qualifying ==
Team	Record	Appearance	Previous
Connecticut	12–3–3	6th	1985
Iowa	16–2–1	5th	1985
Massachusetts	16–3–1	6th	1985
New Hampshire	15–2	4th	1985
North Carolina	17–2	4th	1985
Northwestern	14–3–2	5th	1985
Old Dominion	18–1–2	6th	1985
Penn	12–3	2nd	1983
Penn State	16–3–2	5th	1985
Rutgers	13–5–2	2nd	1984
Stanford	11–4–1	2nd	1985
West Chester	16–4	1st	Never

== Bracket ==
First round November 15; Campus sites
Rutgers	3‡
Penn	2
Piscataway, NJ regional
Connecticut	3
Massachusetts	2
Storrs, CT regional
Northwestern	3
Stanford	0
Iowa City, IA regional
Penn State	2‡
West Chester	1
State College, PA regional

Second round November 16; Campus sites
North Carolina	2
Rutgers	0
New Hampshire	2
Connecticut	1
Iowa	2
Northwestern	1
Old Dominion	0
Penn State	1

Semifinals; November 22; Norfolk, VA
North Carolina	1
New Hampshire	2
Iowa	2
Penn State	0

Championship; November 23; Norfolk, VA
New Hampshire	1
Iowa	2**
Third place
North Carolina	4
Penn State	0

- * indicates overtime period
- ‡ indicates penalty shoot-out

== See also ==
- 1986 NCAA Division II field hockey tournament
- 1986 NCAA Division III field hockey tournament
