= 2020 NCAA Division I field hockey tournament =

2020 NCAA Division I Field Hockey Championship
Tournament details
- Country: United States
- Teams: 12

Final positions
- Champions: North Carolina (9th title)
- Runners-up: Michigan (3rd title match)

Tournament statistics
- Matches played: 11
- Goals scored: 44 (4 per match)

The 2020 NCAA Division I Field Hockey Championship was the 40th annual tournament organized by the NCAA, to determine the national champion of Division I women's college field hockey in the United States.

The semifinals and championship match were scheduled to be played at LR Hill Sport Complex at Old Dominion University in Norfolk, Virginia from November 20 to 22, 2020, however, the tournament was postponed due to the COVID-19 pandemic. The semifinals and championship match was held from May 7 to 9, 2021 at Karen Shelton Stadium at the University of North Carolina in Chapel Hill, North Carolina.

== Qualified teams ==
- A total of 12 teams qualified for the 2020 tournament. Nine teams received automatic bids by winning their conference tournaments and an additional three teams earned at-large bids based on their regular season records.

=== Automatic qualifiers ===
Conference	Champion	Record
America East	Stanford	10–2
ACC	North Carolina	16–1
Atlantic 10	VCU	9–0
Big East	UConn	11–1
Big Ten	Michigan	13–2
CAA	Delaware	6–3
MAC	Miami (OH)	13–1
NEC	Rider	6–1
Patriot	Bucknell	5–3

=== At-large qualifiers ===
Team	Conference	Record
Iowa	Big Ten	11–5
Louisville	ACC	13–5
Northwestern	Big Ten	11–5

== Bracket ==
First round April 30, 2021; Campus sites
Miami (OH)	4
Stanford	5
VCU	1
Bucknell	2
UConn	5
Rider	0
Northwestern	4
Delaware	1

Quarterfinals; May 2, 2021; Campus sites
1	North Carolina	2
Stanford	0
2	Michigan	2
Bucknell	0
3	Louisville	1
UConn	0
4	Iowa	3
Northwestern	1

Semifinals; May 7, 2021; Chapel Hill, North Carolina; Karen Shelton Stadium
1	North Carolina	3
4	Iowa	0
3	Louisville	1
2	Michigan	2

Championship; May 9, 2021; Chapel Hill, North Carolina; Karen Shelton Stadium
1	North Carolina	4
2	Michigan	3

== See also ==
- NCAA Division II Field Hockey Championship
- NCAA Division III Field Hockey Championship
