= 1985 NCAA Division I field hockey tournament =

Tournament details
- Host country: United States
- City: Norfolk, Virginia
- Dates: November 16–24, 1985
- Teams: 12
- Venue: Foreman Field

Final positions
- Champions: Connecticut (2nd title)
- Runner-up: Old Dominion
- Third place: Northwestern

Tournament statistics
- Matches played: 11
- Goals scored: 31 (2.82 per match)

The 1985 NCAA Division I field hockey tournament was the fifth annual single-elimination tournament hosted by the National Collegiate Athletic Association to determine the national champion of women's collegiate field hockey among its Division I members in the United States, the culmination of the 1985 NCAA Division I field hockey season.

The third-place game returned for this tournament after a one-year absence.

Connecticut won their second championship, defeating three-time defending champions and hosts Old Dominion in the final, 3–2. The championship rounds were held at Foreman Field in Norfolk, Virginia.

== Qualifying ==
Team	Record	Appearance	Previous
Boston University	15–2–2	1st	Never
Connecticut	16–2	5th	1984
Iowa	18–3–1	4th	1984
Maryland	13–6–3	1st	Never
Massachusetts	13–4–2	5th	1984
New Hampshire	12–2–5	3rd	1984
North Carolina	13–3	3rd	1984
Northwestern	18–1	4th	1984
Old Dominion	17–5	5th	1984
Penn State	16–3–1	4th	1984
Stanford	9–3–1	1st	Never
Virginia	12–6	3rd	1984

== Bracket ==
First round November 16; Campus sites
Iowa	2
Stanford	1
Evanston, IL regional
Old Dominion	3
Virginia	1
Norfolk, VA regional
Boston University	1
Massachusetts	0
Boston, MA regional
Maryland	1
Penn State	0
Storrs, CT regional

Second round November 17; Campus sites
1	Northwestern (3OT, PS)	3
Iowa	2
4	North Carolina	2
Old Dominion	3
3	New Hampshire	0
Boston University	1
2	Connecticut	2
Maryland	0

Semifinals; November 23; Norfolk, VA
1	Northwestern	0
Old Dominion	1
Boston University	1
2	Connecticut	2

Championship; November 24; Norfolk, VA
Old Dominion	2
2	Connecticut	3
Third place
1	Northwestern	5
Boston University	0

== See also ==
- 1985 NCAA Division II field hockey tournament
- 1985 NCAA Division III field hockey tournament
