= 1990 NCAA Division I field hockey tournament =

Field hockey tournament season

Tournament details
- Host country: United States
- City: Piscataway, New Jersey
- Dates: November 7–18, 1990
- Teams: 12
- Venue: Bauer Field

Final positions
- Champions: Old Dominion (5th title)
- Runner-up: North Carolina
- Third place: Iowa

Tournament statistics
- Matches played: 11
- Goals scored: 38 (3.45 per match)

The 1990 NCAA Division I field hockey tournament was the 10th annual single-elimination tournament hosted by the National Collegiate Athletic Association to determine the national champion of women's collegiate field hockey among its Division I members in the United States, the culmination of the 1990 NCAA Division I field hockey season.

Old Dominion won their fifth championship, defeating North Carolina in the final, 5–0, a rematch of the previous year's final.

The championship rounds were held at Bauer Field on the campus of Rutgers University in Piscataway, New Jersey.

== Qualifying ==
Team	Record	Appearance	Previous
Connecticut	11–7–2	8th	1988
Iowa	17–3	9th	1989
Maryland	11–5–2	4th	1988
Massachusetts	15–5	10th	1989
North Carolina	18–3	8th	1989
Northeastern	14–5–3	3rd	1989
Northwestern	15–2–1	9th	1989
Old Dominion	20–2–1	10th	1989
Penn State	20–2	9th	1989
Providence	18–4–1	3rd	1989
Stanford	8–4–1	4th	1987
Temple	17–5	4th	1984

== Bracket ==
First round November 7–8; Campus sites
Northeastern*	2
Providence	1
Temple*	2*
Maryland	1
Iowa*	7
Stanford	2
Massachusetts*	1†
Connecticut	0

Second round November 10–11; Campus sites
North Carolina*	3
Northeastern	1
Penn State*	5
Temple	0
Northwestern*	0
Iowa	2
Old Dominion*	4
Massachusetts	0

Semifinals; November 17; Piscataway, NJ
North Carolina	1
Penn State	0
Iowa	0
Old Dominion	1

Championship; November 18; Piscataway, NJ
North Carolina	0
Old Dominion	5
Third place
Penn State	0
Iowa	1

- † = Penalty shoot-out
- * = Overtime period

== See also ==
- 1990 NCAA Division II field hockey tournament
- 1990 NCAA Division III field hockey tournament
