= 1989 NCAA Division I field hockey tournament =

Tournament details
- Host country: United States
- City: Springfield, Massachusetts
- Dates: November 12–20, 1989
- Teams: 12
- Venue: Stagg Field

Final positions
- Champions: North Carolina (1st title)
- Runner-up: Old Dominion
- Third place: Northwestern

Tournament statistics
- Matches played: 11
- Goals scored: 32 (2.91 per match)

The 1989 NCAA Division I field hockey tournament was the ninth annual single-elimination tournament hosted by the National Collegiate Athletic Association to determine the national champion of women's collegiate field hockey among its Division I members in the United States, the culmination of the 1989 NCAA Division I field hockey season.

North Carolina won their first championship, defeating Old Dominion in the final, 2–1 after three overtimes and a penalty shoot-out.

The championship rounds were held at Stagg Field in Springfield, Massachusetts.

== Qualifying ==
Team	Record	Appearance	Previous
Boston University	13–4–1	2nd	1985
Iowa	18–0–2	8th	1988
Massachusetts	14–5–2	9th	1988
New Hampshire	14–4	6th	1987
North Carolina	17–2	7th	1988
Northeastern	14–5–2	2nd	1988
Northwestern	16–3–1	8th	1988
Old Dominion	22–1	9th	1988
Pacific	9–5–1	1st	Never
Penn	11–3–1	4th	1988
Penn State	18–2–1	8th	1988
Providence	20–2	2nd	1987

== Bracket ==
First round November 12; Campus sites
Massachusetts	1†
Boston University	0
Boston, MA (BU) regional
Penn	2
Penn State	1
Philadelphia, PA regional
Providence	3
Pacific	1
Iowa City, IA regional
Northeastern	2
New Hampshire	1
Boston, MA (NU) regional

Second round November 13; Campus sites
Old Dominion	2
Massachusetts	1
Northwestern	3
Penn	2
Iowa	5
Providence	0
North Carolina	2
Northeastern	1

Semifinals; November 19; Springfield, MA
Old Dominion	1*
Northwestern	0
Iowa	0
North Carolina	1

Championship; November 20; Springfield, MA
Old Dominion	1
North Carolina	2†
Third place
Northwestern	2
Iowa	1

- † = Penalty shoot-out
- * = Overtime period

== See also ==
- 1989 NCAA Division II field hockey tournament
- 1989 NCAA Division III field hockey tournament
