= 2022 NCAA Division I field hockey tournament =

2022 NCAA Division I Field Hockey Championship
Tournament details
- Country: United States

Final positions
- Champions: North Carolina (10th title)
- Runners-up: Northwestern (2nd title game)

Tournament statistics
- Matches played: 17
- Goals scored: 64 (3.76 per match)

The 2022 NCAA Division I Field Hockey Championship was the 42nd annual tournament organized by the NCAA, to determine the national champion of Division I women's college field hockey in the United States.

The semi-finals and championship match were played at the George B. Sherman Complex at the main campus of the University of Connecticut in Storrs, Connecticut on November 18 and 20, 2022.

Lehigh made their debut appearance in the national championship tournament.

== Qualified teams ==
=== Automatic qualifiers ===
Conference	Champion	Record	Appearance	Last
America East	Albany	15–4	7th	2021
ACC	North Carolina	17–0	39th	2021
Atlantic 10	Saint Joseph's	15–4	5th	2021
Big East	Liberty	12–7	4th	2021
Big Ten	Michigan	14–5	19th	2021
CAA	Delaware	9–11	13th	2021
Ivy	Princeton	13–4	25th	2019
Mid-American	Miami (OH)	13–7	7th	2021
Northeast	Rider	15–5	2nd	2020
Patriot	Lehigh	13–7	1st	—

=== At-large qualifiers ===
Team	Conference	Record	Appearance	Last
Wake Forest	ACC	15–5	18th	2018
Syracuse	ACC	15–5	16th	2021
Virginia	ACC	13–7	26th	2021
Louisville	ACC	12–7	10th	2021
Northwestern	Big Ten	17–4	18th	2021
Maryland	Big Ten	17–3	34th	2021
Penn State	Big Ten	15–3	35th	2021
Iowa	Big Ten	11–7	27th	2021

== Bracket ==
Opening round November 9, 2022; Campus sites
Delaware	4
Lehigh	0
Miami (OH)	7
Rider	1

First round November 11, 2022; Campus sites
1	North Carolina	5
Delaware	1
Saint Joseph's	3
Wake Forest	1
Penn State	5
Louisville	0
4	Michigan	1(1)
UAlbany	1(2)
2	Northwestern	1(3 PSO)
Miami (OH)	1(2)
Virginia	1(3)
Iowa	1(4 PSO)
Princeton	2
Syracuse	5
3	Maryland	1(2)
Liberty	1(1)

Second round November 13, 2022; Campus sites
1	North Carolina	5
Saint Joseph's	2
Penn State	1
UAlbany	0
2	Northwestern	1(4 PSO)
Iowa	1(3)
Syracuse	2(2)
3	Maryland	2(3 PSO)

Semifinals; November 18, 2022; Storrs, Connecticut; Sherman Complex
1	North Carolina	3
Penn State	0
2	Northwestern	2
3	Maryland	1

Championship; November 20, 2022; Storrs, Connecticut; Sherman Complex
1	North Carolina	2
2	Northwestern	1

== See also ==
- NCAA Division II Field Hockey Championship
- NCAA Division III Field Hockey Championship
