= 2017 NCAA Division I field hockey tournament =

2017 NCAA Division I Field Hockey Championship
Tournament details
- Country: United States
- Teams: 18

Final positions
- Champions: Connecticut (5th title)
- Runners-up: Maryland (9th title match)

Tournament statistics
- Matches played: 17
- Goals scored: 70 (4.12 per match)

The 2017 NCAA Division I Field Hockey Championship is the 37th annual tournament organized by the NCAA, to determine the national champion of Division I women's college field hockey in the United States.

The semifinals and championship match will be played at Trager Stadium at the University of Louisville in Louisville, Kentucky from November 17 to 19, 2017.

== Qualified teams ==
- A total of 18 teams qualified for the 2017 tournament, the same number of teams as 2016. 10 teams received automatic bids by winning their conference tournaments and an additional 8 teams earned at-large bids based on their regular season records.

=== Automatic qualifiers ===
Conference	Champion	Record
America East	Stanford	13–7
ACC	North Carolina	16–4
Atlantic 10	Saint Joseph's	18–3
Big East	Connecticut	19–0
Big Ten	Michigan	19–2
CAA	Delaware	15–4
Ivy	Princeton	11–6
MAAC	Fairfield	9–11
MAC	Miami (OH)	11–8
Patriot	Boston University	13–7

=== At-large qualifiers ===
Team	Conference	Record
Duke	ACC	16–3
Louisville	ACC	14–7
Northwestern	Big Ten	14–6
Maryland	Big Ten	13–6
Penn State	Big Ten	16–4
Syracuse	ACC	12–6
Virginia	ACC	15–4
Wake Forest	ACC	12–7

== Bracket ==
Opening round November 8, 2017; Campus sites
Fairfield	0
Boston University*	5
Stanford*	1
Miami (OH)	2

First round November 11, 2017; Campus sites
1	Connecticut*	3
Boston University	1
Delaware	1
Penn State*	2 (OT)
Virginia*	2
Princeton	3 (OT)
Saint Joseph's	0
4	North Carolina*	4
3	Michigan*	1 (OT)
Syracuse	0
Louisville	2
Northwestern*	3 (OT)
Maryland*	2
Wake Forest	0
Miami (OH)	2
2	Duke*	4

Second round November 12, 2017; Campus sites
1	Connecticut*	4
Penn State	3
Princeton	2
4	North Carolina*	3
3	Michigan*	3
Northwestern	0
Maryland	3
Duke*	2

Semifinals; November 17, 2017; Louisville, Kentucky; Trager Stadium
1	Connecticut*	2
4	North Carolina	1
3	Michigan	1
Maryland*	5

Championship; November 19, 2017; Louisville, Kentucky; Trager Stadium
1	Connecticut	2
Maryland	1

== See also ==
- NCAA Division II Field Hockey Championship
- NCAA Division III Field Hockey Championship
