= 1996 NCAA Division I field hockey tournament =

Tournament details
- Host country: United States
- City: Chestnut Hill, Massachusetts
- Dates: November 16–24, 1996
- Venue: Alumni Stadium

Final positions
- Champions: North Carolina (3rd title)
- Runner-up: Princeton (1st title game)

Tournament statistics
- Matches played: 11
- Goals scored: 61 (5.55 per match)

The 1996 NCAA Division I field hockey tournament was the 16th annual tournament organized by the National Collegiate Athletic Association to determine the top women's collegiate field hockey team in the United States.

North Carolina won their third championship, defeating Princeton in the final, 3–0.

The championship rounds were held at Alumni Stadium in Chestnut Hill, Massachusetts, on the campus of Boston College.

== Bracket ==
First round November 16; Campus sites
Virginia	4
Duke	1
Northeastern	3
Massachusetts	0
Maryland	3
Penn State	1
Princeton	5
Boston University	4

Second round November 17; Campus sites
North Carolina	2
Virginia	1
Connecticut	1
Northeastern	3
Old Dominion	7
Maryland	4
Iowa	4
Princeton	5*

Semifinals; November 23; Chestnut Hill, MA
North Carolina	2
Northeastern	1
Old Dominion	3
Princeton	4*

Championship; November 24; Chestnut Hill, MA
North Carolina	3
Princeton	0

- * indicates overtime period
- † indicates penalty shoot-out

== See also ==
- 1996 NCAA Division II field hockey tournament
- 1996 NCAA Division III field hockey tournament
