= 1988 NCAA Division I field hockey tournament =

Tournament details
- Host country: United States
- City: Philadelphia, Pennsylvania
- Dates: November 12–20, 1988
- Teams: 12
- Venue: Franklin Field

Final positions
- Champions: Old Dominion (4th title)
- Runner-up: Iowa
- Third place: Northeastern

Tournament statistics
- Matches played: 11
- Goals scored: 38 (3.45 per match)

The 1988 NCAA Division I field hockey tournament was the eighth annual single-elimination tournament hosted by the National Collegiate Athletic Association to determine the national champion of women's collegiate field hockey among its Division I members in the United States, the culmination of the 1988 NCAA Division I field hockey season.

Old Dominion won their fourth championship, defeating Iowa in the final, 2–1.

The championship rounds were held at Franklin Field in Philadelphia, Pennsylvania.

== Qualifying ==
Team	Record	Appearance	Previous
Chico State	7–5–3	1st	Never
Connecticut	14–3–1	7th	1986
Delaware	16–2–2	2nd	1982
Iowa	16–5	7th	1987
Maryland	11–8–2	3rd	1987
Massachusetts	17–2–1	8th	1987
North Carolina	17–1	6th	1987
Northeastern	13–3–2	1st	Never
Northwestern	17–1–1	7th	1987
Old Dominion	23–1	8th	1987
Penn	13–1–1	3rd	1986
Penn State	14–5–1	7th	1987

== Bracket ==
First round November 12; Campus sites
North Carolina	2
Maryland	0
Norfolk, VA regional
Penn State	3
Delaware	1
Philadelphia, PA regional
Iowa	3
Chico State	0
Iowa City, IA regional
Northeastern	2
Connecticut	1
Amherst, MA regional

Second round November 13; Campus sites
Old Dominion	2
North Carolina	1
Penn (3OT)	2
Penn State	1
Northwestern	3
Iowa (OT)	4
Massachusetts	1
Northeastern	2

Semifinals; November 19; Philadelphia, PA
Old Dominion	4
Penn	0
Iowa	2
Northeastern	1

Championship; November 20; Philadelphia, PA
Old Dominion	2
Iowa	1
Third place
Penn	0
Northeastern	1

== See also ==
- 1988 NCAA Division II field hockey tournament
- 1988 NCAA Division III field hockey tournament
