= 1998 NCAA Division I field hockey tournament =

Tournament details
- Host country: United States
- City: Philadelphia, Pennsylvania
- Dates: November 14–22, 1998
- Venue: Franklin Field

Final positions
- Champions: Old Dominion (8th title)
- Runner-up: Princeton (3rd title game)

Tournament statistics
- Matches played: 11
- Goals scored: 52 (4.73 per match)

The 1998 NCAA Division I field hockey tournament was the 18th annual tournament organized by the National Collegiate Athletic Association to determine the national champion of women's collegiate field hockey in the United States.

Old Dominion won their third championship, defeating Princeton in the final.

The championship rounds were held at Franklin Field in Philadelphia, Pennsylvania, on the campus of the University of Pennsylvania. It was the final tournament with a twelve-team field before an expansion to sixteen teams in 1999.

== Bracket ==
First round November 14; Campus sites
North Carolina	5
Northeastern	0
Virginia	4
Kent State	2
Boston College	3
New Hampshire	2
Penn State	1
Massachusetts	0

Second round November 15; Campus sites
1	Old Dominion	7
North Carolina	2
4	Maryland	1
Virginia	5
2	Connecticut	3
Boston College	0
3	Princeton	3
Penn State	1

Semifinals; November 20; Philadelphia, PA
1	Old Dominion	3
Virginia	0
2	Connecticut	1
3	Princeton	4

Championship; November 22; Philadelphia, PA
1	Old Dominion	3
3	Princeton	2

== See also ==
- 1998 NCAA Division II field hockey tournament
- 1998 NCAA Division III field hockey tournament
