= 1993 NCAA Division I field hockey tournament =

Tournament details
- Host country: United States
- City: Piscataway, New Jersey
- Dates: November 11–21, 1993
- Teams: 12
- Venue: Bauer Field

Final positions
- Champions: Maryland (2nd title)
- Runner-up: North Carolina

Tournament statistics
- Matches played: 11
- Goals scored: 31 (2.82 per match)

The 1993 NCAA Division I field hockey tournament was the 13th annual single-elimination tournament hosted by the National Collegiate Athletic Association to determine the national champion of women's collegiate field hockey among its Division I members in the United States, the culmination of the 1993 NCAA Division I field hockey season.

Maryland won their second championship, defeating North Carolina in the final, 2–1 after two overtime periods and a penalty stroke shoot-out.

The championship rounds were held at Bauer Field on the campus of Rutgers University in Piscataway, New Jersey.

== Qualifying ==
Team	Record	Appearance	Previous
Boston University	16–3–1	4th	1991
California	7–7	4th	1992
Iowa	17–3	12th	1992
James Madison	17–5	1st	Never
Maryland	18–3	7th	1992
Massachusetts	18–3	13th	1992
North Carolina	14–2–3	11th	1992
Northwestern	11–5–1	11th	1991
Old Dominion	17–3–2	13th	1992
Penn	11–4	5th	1989
Penn State	19–1	12th	1992
Syracuse	16–3–1	1st	Never

== Bracket ==
First round November 11; Campus sites
Syracuse*	3
Penn	0
James Madison	1
Old Dominion*	0
Massachusetts*	2
Boston University	0
Northwestern*	3**†
California	2

Second round November 14; Campus sites
Penn State*	4
Syracuse	0
North Carolina*	2*
James Madison	1
Maryland*	2
Massachusetts	1
Iowa*	2
Northwestern	1

Semifinals; November 20; Piscataway, NJ
Penn State	1
North Carolina	2**†
Maryland	1
Iowa	0

Championship; November 21; Piscataway, NJ
North Carolina	1
Maryland	2**†

- * indicates overtime period
- † indicates penalty shoot-out

== See also ==
- 1993 NCAA Division II field hockey tournament
- 1993 NCAA Division III field hockey tournament
