= 1992 NCAA Division I field hockey tournament =

Tournament details
- Host country: United States
- City: Richmond, Virginia
- Dates: November 12–22, 1992
- Teams: 12
- Venue: Cary Street Field

Final positions
- Champions: Old Dominion (7th title)
- Runner-up: Iowa

Tournament statistics
- Matches played: 11
- Goals scored: 46 (4.18 per match)

The 1992 NCAA Division I field hockey tournament was the 12th annual single-elimination tournament hosted by the National Collegiate Athletic Association to determine the national champion of women's collegiate field hockey among its Division I members in the United States, the culmination of the 1992 NCAA Division I field hockey season.

In a match-up of undefeated teams, Old Dominion won their seventh championship, defeating Iowa in the final, 4–0.

The championship rounds were held at Cary Street Field in Richmond, Virginia on the campus of Virginia Commonwealth University (VCU).

== Qualifying ==
Team	Record	Appearance	Previous
Ball State	15–4	1st	Never
California	11–3	3rd	1983
Duke	12–6	1st	Never
Iowa	18–0	11th	1991
Maryland	14–4–1	6th	1991
Massachusetts	20–1	12th	1991
North Carolina	13–6–1	10th	1991
Northeastern	15–6–1	5th	1991
Old Dominion	22–0	12th	1991
Penn State	15–4–1	11th	1991
Temple	12–7–1	6th	1991
Virginia	15–5–1	5th	1987

== Bracket ==
First round November 12; Campus sites
Maryland*	3
Northeastern	1
Duke*	4
Virginia	2
Ball State*	1
California	0
Penn State*	4
Temple	2

Second round November 15; Campus sites
Old Dominion*	6
Maryland	0
North Carolina*	3
Duke	0
Iowa*	5
Ball State	1
Massachusetts*	1*
Penn State	0

Semifinals; November 21; Richmond, VA
Old Dominion	5
North Carolina	0
Iowa	3
Massachusetts	1

Championship; November 22; Richmond, VA
Old Dominion	4
Iowa	0

== See also ==
- 1992 NCAA Division II field hockey tournament
- 1992 NCAA Division III field hockey tournament
