= 2019 NCAA Division I field hockey tournament =

2019 NCAA Division I Field Hockey Championship
Tournament details
- Country: United States
- Teams: 18

Final positions
- Champions: North Carolina (8th title)
- Runners-up: Princeton (4th title match)

Tournament statistics
- Matches played: 17
- Goals scored: 65 (3.82 per match)
- Top goal scorer(s): Erin Matson, UNC (9)

The 2019 NCAA Division I Field Hockey Championship is the 39th annual tournament organized by the NCAA, to determine the national champion of Division I women's college field hockey in the United States.

The semifinals and championship match will be played at Kentner Stadium at Wake Forest University in Winston-Salem, North Carolina from November 22 to 24, 2019.

== Qualified teams ==
- A total of 18 teams qualified for the 2019 tournament, the same number of teams as 2018. 10 teams received automatic bids by winning their conference tournaments and an additional 8 teams earned at-large bids based on their regular season records.

=== Automatic qualifiers ===
Conference	Champion	Record
America East	Stanford	15-6
ACC	North Carolina	19-0
Atlantic 10	Saint Joseph's	17-3
Big East	Connecticut	18-3
Big Ten	Iowa	16-4
CAA	Delaware	16-3
Ivy	Princeton	13-4
MAC	Miami (OH)	11-7
NEC	Fairfield	12-9
Patriot	American	13-5

=== At-large qualifiers ===
Team	Conference	Record
Boston College	ACC	13-7
Duke	ACC	13-7
Louisville	ACC	15-5
Maryland	Big Ten	16-3
Michigan	Big Ten	13-6
Northwestern	Big Ten	14-7
Syracuse	ACC	12-6
Virginia	ACC	16-4

== Bracket ==
Opening round November 13, 2019; Campus sites
Stanford	3
Miami (OH)	1
Fairfield	3
American	1

First round November 15, 2019; Campus sites
1	North Carolina	4
Stanford	0
Duke	2
Iowa	3
Boston College	2
Northwestern	1
Michigan	1 (0)
4	Louisville	1 (1)
3	Virginia	4
Delaware	1
Maryland	4
Saint Joseph's	0
Syracuse	1
Princeton	5
Fairfield	1 (0)
2	Connecticut	1 (1)

Second round November 17, 2019; Campus sites
1	North Carolina	2
Iowa	1
Boston College	1 (2)
4	Louisville	1 (1)
3	Virginia	0 (1)
Maryland	0 (0)
Princeton	2
2	Connecticut	0

Semifinals; November 22, 2019; Winston-Salem, North Carolina; Kentner Stadium
1	North Carolina	6
Boston College	3
3	Virginia	1
Princeton	2

Championship; November 24, 2019; Winston-Salem, North Carolina; Kentner Stadium
1	North Carolina	6
Princeton	1

== See also ==
- NCAA Division II Field Hockey Championship
- NCAA Division III Field Hockey Championship
