= 1995 NCAA Division I field hockey tournament =

Tournament details
- Host country: United States
- City: (North Carolina) Winston-Salem, NC
- Dates: November 9–19, 1995
- Teams: 12
- Venue: Kentner Stadium

Final positions
- Champions: North Carolina (2nd title)
- Runner-up: Maryland (2nd title game)

Tournament statistics
- Matches played: 11
- Goals scored: 39 (3.55 per match)

The 1995 NCAA Division I Field Hockey Championship was the 15th women's collegiate field hockey tournament organized by the National Collegiate Athletic Association, to determine the top college field hockey team in the United States.

North Carolina won their second championship, defeating Maryland in the final, 5–1.

The championship rounds were held at Kentner Stadium in Winston-Salem, North Carolina on the campus of Wake Forest University.

== Bracket ==
First round November 9 Campus sites
Princeton	3
Syracuse	2
Penn State	5
Stanford	0
Old Dominion (OT)	2
Virginia	1
Northeastern	2
Ball State	0

Second round November 12; Campus sites
North Carolina	6
Princeton	0
James Madison	3
Penn State	0
Maryland	1
Old Dominion	0
Iowa	0
Northeastern	1

Semifinals; November 18; Winston-Salem, NC
North Carolina	3
James Madison	0
Maryland	3
Northeastern	1

Championship; November 19; Winston-Salem, NC
North Carolina	5
Maryland	1

- * indicates overtime period
- † indicates penalty shoot-out

== See also ==
- 1995 NCAA Division II field hockey tournament
- 1995 NCAA Division III field hockey tournament
