= 1987 NCAA Division I field hockey tournament =

Tournament details
- Host country: United States
- City: Chapel Hill, North Carolina
- Dates: November 14–22, 1987
- Teams: 12
- Venue: Navy Field

Final positions
- Champions: Maryland (1st title)
- Runner-up: North Carolina
- Third place: Massachusetts

Tournament statistics
- Matches played: 11
- Goals scored: 32 (2.91 per match)

The 1987 NCAA Division I field hockey tournament was the seventh annual single-elimination tournament hosted by the National Collegiate Athletic Association to determine the national champion of women's collegiate field hockey among its Division I members in the United States, the culmination of the 1987 NCAA Division I field hockey season.

Maryland won their first championship, defeating hosts North Carolina in the final, 2–1 after one overtime period.

The championship rounds were held at Navy Field in Chapel Hill, North Carolina.

== Qualifying ==
Team	Record	Appearance	Previous
Iowa	16–3–2	6th	1986
Maryland	15–4–1	2nd	1985
Massachusetts	11–5–3	7th	1986
New Hampshire	10–6–1	5th	1986
North Carolina	17–1	5th	1986
Northwestern	13–5–3	6th	1986
Old Dominion	15–4–2	7th	1986
Penn State	14–4–2	6th	1986
Providence	18–0–3	1st	Never
Stanford	10–5–1	3rd	1986
Virginia	12–3	4th	1985
West Chester	18–2–1	2nd	1986

== Bracket ==
First round November 14; Campus sites
Old Dominion	4
Virginia	0
Chapel Hill, NC regional
Massachusetts	2
New Hampshire	0
Durham, NH regional
Northwestern	2
Stanford	0
Iowa City, IA regional
West Chester	2
Penn State	0
West Chester, PA regional

Second round November 15; Campus sites
North Carolina	3
Old Dominion	1
Providence	1
Massachusetts	4
Iowa	1
Northwestern	0
Maryland	2
West Chester	1

Semifinals; November 21; Chapel Hill, NC
North Carolina	3
Massachusetts	0
Iowa	1
Maryland	2

Championship; November 22; Chapel Hill, NC
North Carolina	1
Maryland (OT)	2
Third place
Massachusetts	3
Iowa	1

== See also ==
- 1987 NCAA Division II field hockey tournament
- 1987 NCAA Division III field hockey tournament
