= 2000 NCAA Division I field hockey tournament =

Tournament details
- Host country: United States
- City: Norfolk, Virginia
- Dates: November 13–21, 2000
- Venue: Foreman Field

Final positions
- Champions: Old Dominion (9th title)
- Runner-up: North Carolina (10th title game)

Tournament statistics
- Matches played: 15
- Goals scored: 93 (6.2 per match)

The 2000 NCAA Division I field hockey tournament was the 20th annual tournament organized by the National Collegiate Athletic Association to determine the national champion of women's collegiate field hockey in the United States.

Hosts Old Dominion won their record ninth championship, defeating North Carolina in the final, 3–1.

The semifinals and championship were played at Foreman Field in Norfolk, Virginia, hosted by Old Dominion University.

== Bracket ==
First round November 11; Campus sites
1	Old Dominion	6
Stanford	1
Connecticut	2
Virginia	1
4	Wake Forest	6
Harvard	3
Michigan	3*
William & Mary	2
3	Maryland	9
New Hampshire	1
Princeton	4
Penn State	2
2	North Carolina	5
Kent State	3
Massachusetts	2
Boston U.	1

Second round November 12; Campus sites
1	Old Dominion	6
Connecticut	4
4	Wake Forest	3
Michigan	2
3	Maryland	3
Princeton	1
2	North Carolina	5
Massachusetts	1

Semifinals; November 17; Norfolk, VA
1	Old Dominion	6
4	Wake Forest	0
3	Maryland	1
2	North Carolina	4

Championship; November 19; Norfolk, VA
1	Old Dominion	3
2	North Carolina	1

== See also ==
- 2000 NCAA Division II field hockey tournament
- 2000 NCAA Division III field hockey tournament
