= 2025 NCAA Division I field hockey championship =

2025 NCAA Division I Field Hockey Championship

Tournament details
- Country: United States
- Venue(s): Williams Field at Jack Katz Stadium; Durham, NC
- Dates: November 21–23, 2025

Final positions
- Champions: Northwestern (3rd national title)
- Runners-up: Princeton (5th title game)

Tournament statistics
- Matches played: 17
- Goals scored: 63 (3.71 per match)

The 2025 NCAA Division I Field Hockey Championship was the 45th women's collegiate field hockey tournament organized by the NCAA, to determine the national champion of Division I women's college field hockey in the United States.

The semifinals and championship match were played at the Williams Field at Jack Katz Stadium at Duke University in Durham, North Carolina from November 21–23.

== Qualified teams ==
=== Automatic qualifiers ===
Conference	Champion	Record	Appearance	Last
America East	New Hampshire	12-6	11th	2013
ACC	North Carolina	19–1	42nd	2024
Atlantic 10	Saint Joseph's	11-9	8th	2024
Big East	Liberty	17-2	6th	2023
Big Ten	Northwestern	18-1	21st	2024
CAA	Drexel	13-7	3rd	2012
Ivy	Princeton	15–3	27th	2024
Mid-American	Miami (OH)	15–4	10th	2024
NEC	Fairfield	15–5	7th	2024
Patriot	Boston University	8-10	15th	2018

=== At-large qualifiers ===
Team	Conference	Record	Appearance	Last
Duke	ACC	12-7	21st	2024
Syracuse	ACC	12-6	19th	2024
Virginia	ACC	16-2	29th	2024
Wake Forest	ACC	15-4	19th	2022
UConn	Big East	11-8	22nd	2024
Iowa	Big Ten	14-5	29th	2023
Harvard	Ivy	17-1	10th	2024
Yale	Ivy	12-5	1st	-

== Bracket ==
Opening round November 12, 2025; Campus sites
Drexel	0
Saint Joseph's	2
Fairfield	1
Boston U.	0

First round November 14, 2025; Campus sites
1	North Carolina*	2
Saint Joseph's	1
Iowa	1
Duke	2
Northwestern	5
Yale	1
Miami (OH)	2
4	Virginia*	1
3	Harvard*	8
New Hampshire	2
UConn	2
Wake Forest	0
Syracuse	3
Liberty	2
Fairfield	1
2	Princeton*	3

Second round November 16, 2025; Campus sites
1	North Carolina (OT)	1 (1)
Duke	1 (0)
Northwestern	3
Miami (OH)	2
3	Harvard	1
UConn	0
Syracuse	1
2	Princeton	2

Semifinals; November 21, 2025; Durham, North Carolina; Williams Field at Jack Katz Stadium
1	North Carolina	3 (0)
Northwestern (OT)	3 (1)
3	Harvard	0
2	Princeton	2

Championship; November 23, 2025; Durham, North Carolina; Williams Field at Jack Katz Stadium
Northwestern (2OT)	1 (1)
2	Princeton	1 (0)

== See also ==
- NCAA Division II field hockey tournament
- NCAA Division III field hockey tournament
