= 1991 NCAA Division I field hockey tournament =

Women's Hockey Tournament

Tournament details
- Host country: United States
- City: Villanova, Pennsylvania
- Dates: November 14–24, 1991
- Teams: 12
- Venue: Villanova Stadium

Final positions
- Champions: Old Dominion (6th title)
- Runner-up: North Carolina
- Third place: Maryland

Tournament statistics
- Matches played: 11
- Goals scored: 33 (3 per match)

The 1991 NCAA Division I field hockey tournament was the 11th annual single-elimination tournament hosted by the National Collegiate Athletic Association to determine the national champion of women's collegiate field hockey among its Division I members in the United States, the culmination of the 1991 NCAA Division I field hockey season.

In a rematch of the previous two years' finals, Old Dominion won their sixth championship, defeating North Carolina in the final, 2–0.

The championship rounds were held at Villanova Stadium on the campus of Villanova University in Villanova, Pennsylvania.

== Qualifying ==
| Team | Record | Appearance | Previous |
|---|---|---|---|
| Boston University | 13–6–1 | 3rd | 1989 |
| Harvard | 13–2–2 | 1st | Never |
| Iowa | 16–1–1 | 10th | 1990 |
| Maryland | 15–4–1 | 5th | 1990 |
| Massachusetts | 14–6–1 | 11th | 1990 |
| North Carolina | 13–5–1 | 9th | 1990 |
| Northeastern | 11–8–1 | 4th | 1990 |
| Northwestern | 12–6–1 | 10th | 1990 |
| Old Dominion | 23–0 | 11th | 1990 |
| Penn State | 17–1–1 | 10th | 1990 |
| Stanford | 10–3 | 5th | 1990 |
| Temple | 15–4–2 | 5th | 1990 |

== Bracket ==
First round November 14; Campus sites
Northeastern* | 2**
Massachusetts | 1
Iowa* | 5
Stanford | 0
Temple* | 2
Northwestern | 1
Boston University* | 3
Harvard | 0

Second round November 17; Campus sites
Old Dominion* | 4
Northeastern | 1
Maryland* | 2
Iowa | 1
North Carolina* | 1
Temple | 0
Penn State* | 3
Boston University | 0

Semifinals; November 23; Villanova, PA
Old Dominion | 3
Maryland | 1
North Carolina | 1
Penn State | 0

Championship; November 24; Villanova, PA
Old Dominion | 2
North Carolina | 0
Third place
Maryland | 2*
Penn State | 1

- † = Penalty shoot-out
- * = Overtime period

== See also ==
- 1991 NCAA Division II field hockey tournament
- 1991 NCAA Division III field hockey tournament
