= 1999 NCAA Division I field hockey tournament =

Tournament details
- Host country: United States
- City: Brookline, Massachusetts
- Dates: November 13–21, 1999
- Venue: Parsons Field

Final positions
- Champions: Maryland (3rd title)
- Runner-up: Michigan (1st title game)

Tournament statistics
- Matches played: 15
- Goals scored: 58 (3.87 per match)

The 1999 NCAA Division I field hockey tournament was the 19th annual tournament organized by the National Collegiate Athletic Association to determine the national champion of women's collegiate field hockey in the United States.

Maryland won their third championship, defeating the Michigan in the final, 2–1.

The semifinals and championship were hosted by Northeastern University at Parsons Field in Brookline, Massachusetts.

== Bracket ==
First round November 13; Campus sites
1	Maryland	6
Lafayette	0
Old Dominion	3
Virginia	0
4	Iowa	3
Kent State	2
North Carolina	1
Penn State	0
3	Wake Forest	3
James Madison	0
Michigan	2
Duke	1
2	Connecticut	6
Brown	0
Massachusetts	2*
Boston University	1

Second round November 14; Campus sites
1	Maryland	3*
Old Dominion	2
4	Iowa	2
North Carolina	0
3	Wake Forest	2
Michigan (2OT)	3
2	Connecticut	2
Massachusetts	1

Semifinals; November 19; Brookline, MA
1	Maryland (2OT)	2
4	Iowa	1
Michigan	4
2	Connecticut	3

Championship; November 21; Brookline, MA
1	Maryland	2
Michigan	1

== See also ==
- 1999 NCAA Division II field hockey tournament
- 1999 NCAA Division III field hockey tournament
