= 2004 NCAA Division I field hockey tournament =

Tournament details
- Host country: United States
- City: (North Carolina) Winston-Salem, NC
- Dates: November 13–21, 2004
- Venue: Kentner Stadium

Final positions
- Champions: Wake Forest (3rd title)
- Runner-up: Duke (2nd title game)

Tournament statistics
- Matches played: 15
- Goals scored: 66 (4.4 per match)

The 2004 NCAA Division I field hockey tournament was the 24th annual tournament organized by the National Collegiate Athletic Association to determine the national champion of women's collegiate field hockey among its Division I members in the United States.

Wake Forest won their third consecutive championship, defeating Duke in the final, 3–0, a rematch of the 2003 finale.

The semifinals and championship were played at Kentner Stadium in Winston-Salem, North Carolina, hosted by Wake Forest University.

== Qualifying ==
No teams made their debuts in the NCAA Division I field hockey tournament this year.

== Bracket ==
First round November 13; Campus sites
1	North Carolina	3
Richmond	0
Duke	5
Old Dominion	3
Michigan State	2
Boston College	0
4	Michigan (OT)	2
Pacific	1
3	Maryland	5
Delaware	2
American	2
Iowa	1
Northeastern (OT)	2
Connecticut	1
2	Wake Forest	7
Harvard	1

Second round November 14; Campus sites
1	North Carolina	1
Duke	2
4	Michigan State	3
Michigan	2
3	Maryland	2
American	0
Northeastern	2
2	Wake Forest	4

Semifinals; November 19; Winston-Salem, NC
Duke	5
Michigan State	2
3	Maryland	0
2	Wake Forest	3

Championship; November 21; Winston-Salem, NC
Duke	0
2	Wake Forest	3

== See also ==
- 2004 NCAA Division II field hockey tournament
- 2004 NCAA Division III field hockey tournament
