= 2007 NCAA Division I field hockey tournament =

Tournament details
- Host country: United States
- City: College Park, Maryland
- Dates: November 10–18, 2007
- Venue: Maryland Field Hockey & Lacrosse Complex

Final positions
- Champions: North Carolina (5th title)
- Runner-up: Penn State (2nd title game)

Tournament statistics
- Matches played: 15
- Goals scored: 56 (3.73 per match)
- Top scorer(s): Katelyn Falgowski, UNC; Shaun Banta, PSU (3 goals)

The 2007 NCAA Division I field hockey tournament was the 27th annual tournament organized by the National Collegiate Athletic Association to determine the national champion of women's collegiate field hockey among its Division I members in the United States.

North Carolina won their fifth championship, defeating Penn State in the final, 3–0.

The semifinals and championship were played at the Maryland Field Hockey & Lacrosse Complex in College Park, Maryland, hosted by the University of Maryland.

== Qualifying ==
No teams made their debut in the NCAA Division I field hockey tournament.

== Bracket ==
First round November 10; Campus sites
1	North Carolina	4
Stanford	0
James Madison	5
Duke	4
Boston University	1**
Iowa	0
4	Connecticut	4*
Massachusetts	1
3	Wake Forest	3
Michigan State	2
Michigan	1*
Ohio	0
Penn State	3
Virginia	2
2	Maryland	5
Old Dominion	0

Second round November 11; Campus sites
1	North Carolina	1
James Madison	0
Boston University	1
4	Connecticut	2
3	Wake Forest	3
Michigan	2
Penn State	1
2	Maryland	0

Semifinals; November 16; College Park, MD
1	North Carolina	4
4	Connecticut	2
3	Wake Forest	0
Penn State	2

Championship; November 18; College Park, MD
1	North Carolina	3
Penn State	0

== See also ==
- 2007 NCAA Division II field hockey tournament
- 2007 NCAA Division III field hockey tournament
