= Vermont Catamounts field hockey =

College field hockey team

- University: University of Vermont
- Head coach: Kate Pfeifer
- Stadium: Moulton Winder Field at Archie Post Athletic Complex
- Location: Burlington, Vermont
- Conference: America East
- Nickname: Catamounts
- Colors: Green and gold

NCAA Tournament appearances
- 2024, 2026

Conference Tournament championships
- 2024, 2026

The Vermont Catamounts field hockey team represents the University of Vermont in NCAA Division I field hockey competition. The Catamounts compete as members of the America East Conference. Vermont plays their home games at Moulton Winder Field at Archie Post Athletic Complex. The Catamounts are led by head coach Kate Pfeifer.

== History ==
Vermont field hockey began competition in 1979 under head coach Janice Lange.

In 2024, Vermont defeated New Hampshire 3-2 in the America East tournament championship game. The win gave Vermont field hockey their first-ever America East conference title and first NCAA tournament appearance. In the 2024 NCAA Division I field hockey tournament, Vermont lost to Miami (OH) 2-1.

In 2025, the Catamounts could not repeat as America East champions and lost the conference final to New Hampshire 1-0, ending an 11-8 season.

In 2026, Vermont won the America East tournament championship in a 3-2 OT shootout win over Albany, making their 2nd NCAA tournament appearance in program history. In the 2026 NCAA Division I Field Hockey Championship, the Catamounts lost to St. Joe's 2-1. The 14-win 2026 season marked a new program record for wins in a season.

== See also ==
- List of NCAA Division I field hockey programs
