= Indiana Hoosiers field hockey =

- Full name: Indiana Hoosiers field hockey
- Nickname(s): Hoosiers
- Founded: 2000
- Home ground: IU Field Hockey Complex (Capacity 500)

Personnel
- Coach: Kayla Bashore

Affiliation
- University: Indiana University
- Conference: Big Ten Conference

NCAA Tournament appearances
- 2005, 2009

The Indiana Hoosiers field hockey team is the intercollegiate field hockey program representing Indiana University. The school competes in the Big Ten Conference in Division I of the National Collegiate Athletic Association (NCAA). The Indiana field hockey team plays its home games at the IU Field Hockey Complex on the university campus in Bloomington, Indiana. Indiana has appeared in the NCAA tournament twice and finished runner-up in the Big Ten three times since the field hockey program was created in 2000. The team is currently coached by Kayla Bashore.

== History ==
Field hockey has been a varsity sport at Indiana University since 2000. The Hoosiers have been a member of the Big Ten Conference and have been coached by Amy Robertson in each season of the program's existence. The team has twice appeared in the NCAA tournament, in 2005 and 2009, playing a total of three games. Indiana defeated North Carolina in the first round in 2005, while it was eliminated by Wake Forest both in the 2005 second round and the 2009 first round. The Hoosiers' best regular-season performance in the Big Ten has been second place, which it has accomplished three times, in 2005, 2006, and 2009. Indiana has also played in the Big Ten tournament championship game twice, losing both, to Michigan in 2005 and to Michigan State in 2009.

=== Season-by-season results ===
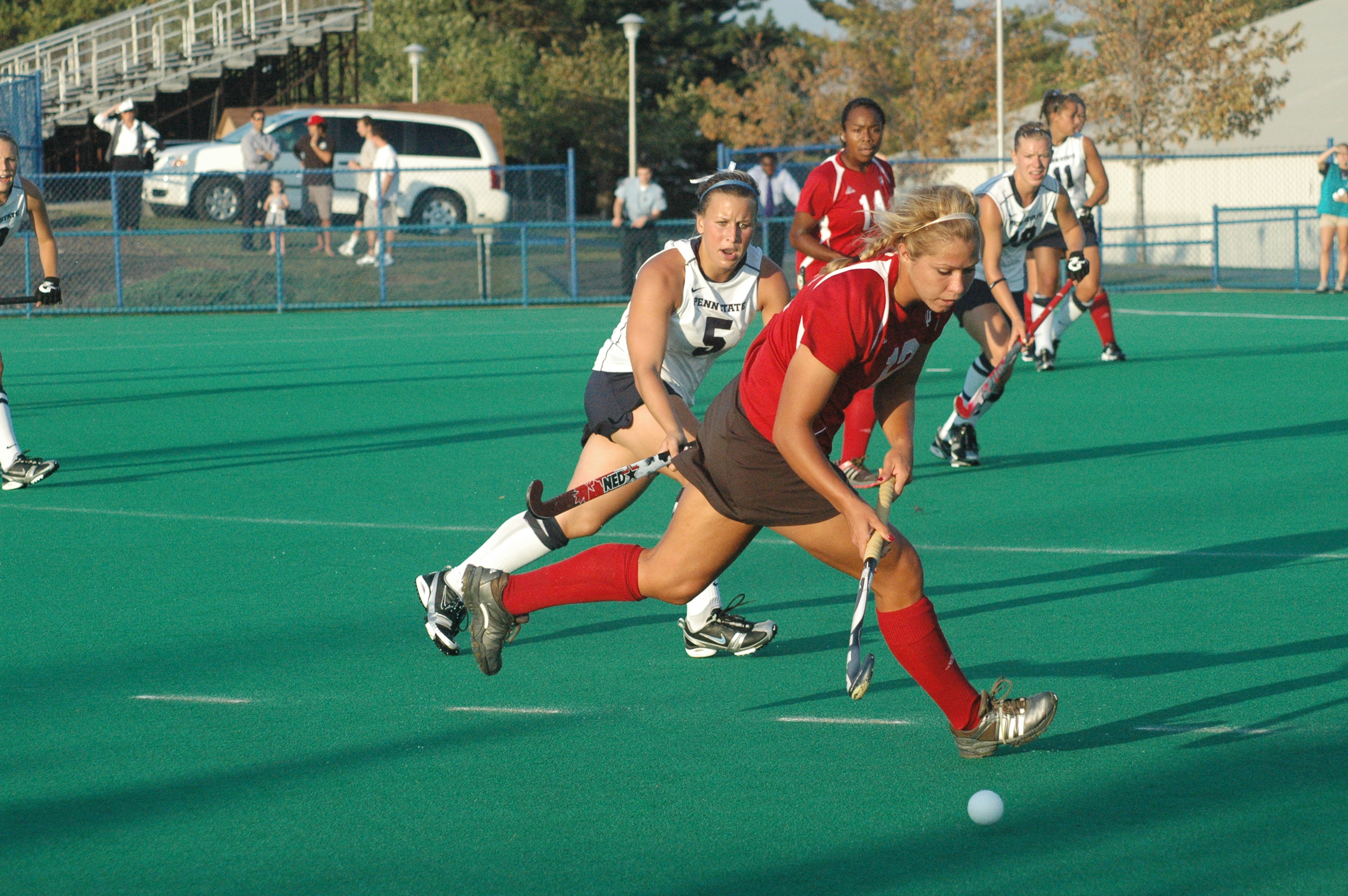
The 2010 Indiana field hockey team in action at Penn State

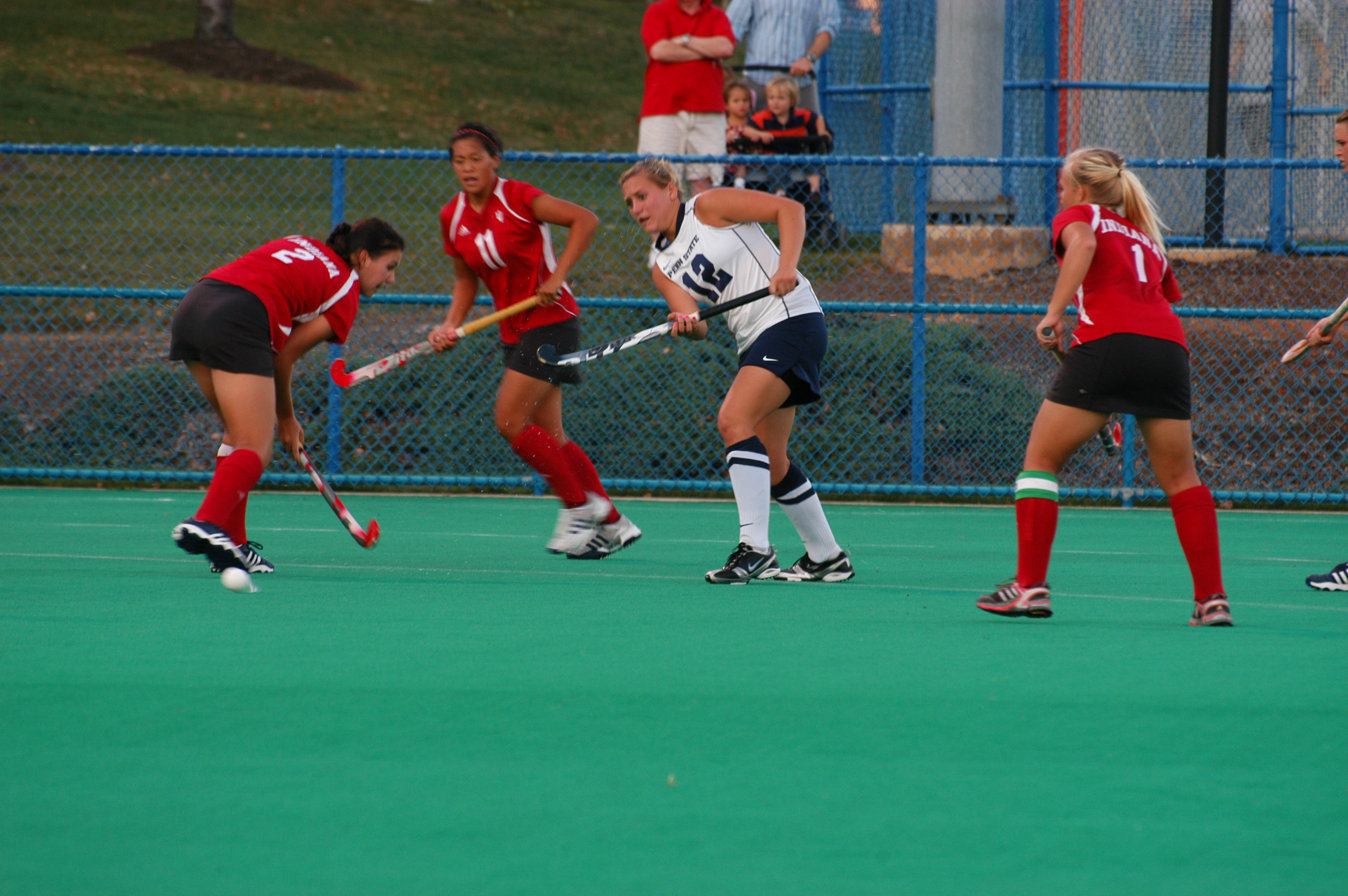

Year	Head coach	Overall	Pct.	Conf.	Pct.	Conf. Place	Conf. Tourn.	Postseason
2000	Amy Robertson	1–12	.077	0–6	.000	7th	1st Round	–
2001	Amy Robertson	1–16	.059	0–6	.000	7th	1st Round	–
2002	Amy Robertson	6–13	.316	1–5	.167	T6th	1st Round	–
2003	Amy Robertson	8–10	.444	1–5	.167	T6th	1st Round	–
2004	Amy Robertson	12–8-1	.595	1–5-0	.167	T5th	1st Round	–
2005	Amy Robertson	18–5	.783	4–2	.667	2nd	Finalist	NCAA 2nd Round
2006	Amy Robertson	15–6	.714	4–2	.667	T2nd	1st Round	–
2007	Amy Robertson	8–10	.444	1–5	.167	6th	1st Round	–
2008	Amy Robertson	7–12	.368	1–5	.167	T6th	1st Round	–
2009	Amy Robertson	16–7	.696	4–2	.667	T2nd	Finalist	NCAA 1st Round
2010	Amy Robertson	10–9	.526	1–4	.200	6th	1st Round	–
2011	Amy Robertson	10–9	.526	2–4	.333	5th	1st Round	–
2012	Amy Robertson	11–10	.524	0–6	.000	7th	2nd Round	–
2013	Amy Robertson	9–10	.474	1–5	.167	6th	1st Round	–
2014	Amy Robertson	9–8	.529	1–7	.125	T8th	–	–
2015	Amanda Janney	9–10	.474	5–3	.625	3rd	1st Round	–
2016	Amanda Janney	8–12	.400	3–5	.375	6th	1st Round	–
2017	Amanda Janney	6-13	.316	0-8	.000		–	–
2018	Amanda Janney	4-13	.235	1-7	.125	9th	1st Round	–
2019	Kayla Bashore	5-12	.294	1-7	.125	7th	–	–
2020	Kayla Bashore	1-14	.067	1-14	.067	9th	1st Round	–
2021	Kayla Bashore	10-10	.500	2-6	.250	7th	1st Round	–
2022	Kayla Bashore	9-10	.474	1-7	.125	9th	–	–
2023	Kayla Bashore	6-13	.316	0-8	.000	9th	–	–

Season-by-season results through the end of the 2023 season

== Awards and accolades ==
=== All-Americans ===
Key
First-team selection	Second-team selection	Third-team selection

Season	Player	Remarks
2004	Kayla Bashore	
2005	Kayla Bashore	Second selection
2005	Lydia Schrott	
2006	Morgan Miller	
2009	Corey Brautigam	
2012	Morgan Fleetwood	
2013	Audra Heilman	
2014	Audra Heilman	Second selection

Awards and accolades through the end of the 2014 season

== Stadium ==
Indiana has played its home games at the IU Field Hockey Complex since its opening in August 2007. The complex has a seating capacity of 500 and features a Polytan playing surface as well as a Nelson Water Cannon system for watering the field before play. Built adjacent to Bill Armstrong Stadium, the home of the Indiana men's and women's soccer teams, the IU Field Hockey Complex serves the Hoosiers field hockey program as a practice venue in addition to as a game venue. In August 2009, the Ireland Family Fieldhouse was added to the complex, which houses the team's locker room, a staff meeting room, and equipment storage space. Prior to the construction of the IU Field Hockey Complex, the Indiana field hockey team played its home games inside Mellencamp Pavilion from 2000 to 2006, making it one of only a few American collegiate field hockey programs to play indoors.

== See also ==
- List of NCAA Division I field hockey programs
