= Rutgers Scarlet Knights field hockey =

- University: Rutgers University
- Conference: Big Ten Conference; 1 Division
- Head coach: Meredith Civico
- Field: Capacity: undisclosed
- Location: Piscataway, New Jersey
- Colors: Scarlet

NCAA Tournament appearances
- 1984, 1986, 2018, 2021, 2023

The Rutgers Scarlet Knights field hockey team is the intercollegiate field hockey program representing Rutgers University–New Brunswick, the main campus of Rutgers University. The school competes in the Big Ten Conference in Division I of the National Collegiate Athletic Association (NCAA), although it was previously a member of the Atlantic 10 Conference (A-10), the original Big East Conference, and the new Big East Conference. The Rutgers field hockey team plays its home games at the Bauer Track and Field/Field Hockey Complex on the university's Livingston Campus in Piscataway, New Jersey. Since the field hockey program was established in 1974, the Scarlet Knights have appeared in the NCAA tournament twice, placed runner-up in regular-season conference play three times, and finished second in a conference tournament twice. The team is currently coached by Meredith Civico.

== History ==
Field hockey has been a varsity sport at Rutgers University since 1974. Between 1988 and 1994, the Scarlet Knights competed in the Atlantic 10 Conference (A-10), while from 1995 to 2012 they were a member of the original Big East Conference, and in 2013 they played field hockey as an associate member of the new Big East Conference. Beginning with the 2014 season, Rutgers (along with Maryland) has joined the Big Ten Conference, expanding it to nine field hockey members. The team has twice appeared in the NCAA tournament, in 1984 and 1986, playing a total of four games. In 1984, Rutgers defeated Penn State in the first round before losing to Temple in the quarterfinals, while in 1986 it beat Pennsylvania in the first round before being eliminated by North Carolina in the quarterfinals. The Scarlet Knights' best regular-season conference performance has been second place, which it has accomplished three times, in 1993 as a member of the A-10, and in 1995 and 2000 as a member of the Big East. Rutgers has also made two appearances in conference tournament championship games, in the 1993 A-10 tournament and in the 1995 Big East tournament. In 1993, the Scarlet Knights lost the title game to Massachusetts, while in 1995 they were defeated by Syracuse.

=== Season-by-season results ===
Year	Head coach	Overall	Pct.	Conf.	Pct.	Conf. Place	Conf. Tourn.	Postseason
1974	Ellen Jones	5–5–2	.500	–	–	–	–	–
1975	Patricia Weinert	5–4–2	.545	–	–	–	–	–
1976	Betty Logan	6–3–4	.615	–	–	–	–	–
1977	Ann Petracco	6–6–3	.500	–	–	–	–	–
1978	Ann Petracco	11–6–1	.639	–	–	–	–	–
1979	Ann Petracco	9–5–4	.611	–	–	–	–	–
1980	Ann Petracco	4–7–4	.400	–	–	–	–	–
1981	Ann Petracco	6–11–5	.386	–	–	–	–	–
1982	Ann Petracco	11–9	.550	–	–	–	–	–
1983	Ann Petracco	8–10–3	.452	–	–	–	–	–
1984	Ann Petracco	15–4–4	.739	–	–	–	–	NCAA 2nd Round
1985	Ann Petracco	11–7–3	.595	–	–	–	–	–
1986	Ann Petracco	14–6–2	.682	–	–	–	–	NCAA 2nd Round
1987	Ann Petracco	5–12–4	.333	–	–	–	–	–
1988	Ann Petracco	11–8–1	.575	2–2–1	.500	3rd (East)	T3rd	–
1989	Ann Petracco	13–9	.591	1–4	.200	T4th	T3rd	–
1990	Ann Petracco	10–10–2	.500	2–3	.400	4th	T3rd	–
1991	Ann Petracco	9–11	.450	2–2	.500	3rd	T3rd	–
1992	Ann Petracco	7–11–3	.405	1–3	.250	T3rd	T3rd	–
1993	Ann Petracco	14–8	.636	3–1	.750	2nd	2nd	–
1994	Ann Petracco	10–10–1	.500	2–1–1	.625	3rd	T3rd	–
1995	Ann Petracco	13–8	.619	3–2	.600	T2nd	2nd	–
1996	Ann Petracco	9–11	.450	1–4	.200	5th	–	–
1997	Ann Petracco	14–7	.667	2–3	.400	5th	–	–
1998	Ann Petracco	13–7	.650	2–3	.400	5th	–	–
1999	Ann Petracco	10–7	.588	2–3	.400	T3rd	–	–
2000	Ann Petracco	8–11	.421	3–2	.600	2nd	T3rd	–
2001	Ann Petracco	4–13	.235	1–4	.200	T4th	T3rd	–
2002	Ann Petracco	3–16	.158	0–5	.000	6th	–	–
2003	Liz Tchou	7–13	.350	2–3	.400	4th	T3rd	–
2004	Liz Tchou	6–13	.316	1–4	.200	T5th	–	–
2005	Liz Tchou	7–12	.368	0–5	.000	6th	–	–
2006	Liz Tchou	6–13	.316	1–5	.167	6th	–	–
2007	Liz Tchou	8–11	.421	1–5	.167	6th	–	–
2008	Liz Tchou	14–6	.700	1–5	.167	6th	–	–
2009	Liz Tchou	2–16	.111	0–6	.000	7th	–	–
2010	Liz Tchou	8–12	.400	2–4	.333	T4th	T3rd	–
2011	Liz Tchou	5–13	.278	2–4	.333	5th	–	–
2012	Meredith Civico (then Meredith Long)	9–10	.474	2–4	.333	T5th	–	–
2013	Meredith Civico (then Meredith Long)	9–9	.500	2–4	.333	6th	–	–
2014	Meredith Civico (then Meredith Long)	9–10	.474	2–6	.250	7th	T5th	–

Season-by-season results through the end of the 2014 season

== Awards and accolades ==
=== All-Americans ===
Key
First-team selection	Second-team selection	Third-team selection

Season	Player	Remarks
1986	Janice Fuls	
1993	Heather Jones	
1994	Nicole Wilson	
1995	Valerie Coyle	
1996	Brandi Bailey	
1998	Jayne Pedrick	
1999	Andschana Mendes	
2000	Andschana Mendes	Second selection
2001	Andschana Mendes	Third selection
2008	Amy Lewis	

Individual honors through the end of the 2014 season

== Stadium ==
Rutgers has played its home games at the Bauer Track and Field/Field Hockey Complex since 2009. Dedicated in April 1996, the Bauer Track and Field complex was originally designed specifically for track and field. The complex is located on the university's Livingston Campus adjacent to the Louis Brown Athletic Center (formerly the Rutgers Athletic Center), which is the home of the Rutgers men's and women's basketball teams. The Bauer Track and Field complex has also played host to the Big East Conference Outdoor Track and Field Championships in 2004 and 2005. In 2009, the inner oval of the complex was adapted for field hockey play in preparation for use by the Scarlet Knights field hockey team. Among the adaptations to the complex was the installation of an AstroTurf 12 playing surface, which was chosen by Rutgers due to its playability, durability, and low maintenance costs.

== See also ==
- List of NCAA Division I field hockey programs
