= L.R. Hill Sports Complex =

Athletic building at Old Dominion University, Virginia, United States

Coordinates: 36.8818°N 76.3135°W

- Interactive map of L.R. Hill Sports Complex
- Former names: Powhatan Sports Complex
- Location: 4251 Powhatan Ave; Norfolk, Virginia, U.S.
- Owner: Old Dominion University
- Operator: Old Dominion University
- Capacity: 1,500 (exp. to 3,000)
- Surface: AstroTurf

Construction
- Built: 2007–08
- Opened: 2008

Tenants
- Old Dominion Monarchs (NCAA) (2008–present)

Website
- L.R. Hill Sports Complex

The L.R. Hill Sports Complex is an athletic building on the campus of Old Dominion University in Norfolk, Virginia. Construction started in August 2007 and the building opened on September 13, 2008. Built by S.B. Ballard, who has constructed many buildings at ODU including Chartway Arena and the University Village Apartments.

== Description ==
The L.R. Hill Sports Complex is a 48,000-square-foot (4,500 m^{2}) building that houses Old Dominion Football, Women's Lacrosse, and Women's Field Hockey. The facility cost $17 Million to build. It is located along Powhatan Avenue near the Lambert's Point Golf Club and Golf Course. Included in the Powhatan Sports Complex is a 6,000-square-foot (560 m^{2}) area for strength & conditioning, players lounges, locker rooms, high definition screens, and a 3,000-square-foot (280 m^{2}) athletic training area.

== History ==
Motivation for the complex began with the re-addition of football to Old Dominion University. The school used to have a team from 1930–41 and in 2005 the Board of Visitors voted unanimously in favor of adding football.

To get land for the complex, just less than 3 acres, ODU gave the city of Norfolk 3 acres of land near Lambert's Point across Hampton Boulevard.

For lacrosse and field hockey, a new field was built that shares the both. Stands face east, with the press box on the opposite side. Their offices are located on the 1st and 2nd floors of the complex. All three occupants share the athletic and strength & conditioning areas, while individually having their own offices and locker rooms.

== Football ==
The football offices are located on the 2nd floor of the building. Coaches offices and meeting rooms occupy the upstairs. The players' locker rooms, lounge and equipment room are located on the 1st floor near the practice fields. A 100-yard football field and a 60-yard football field was built adjacent to the lacrosse and field hockey stadium. All outside areas are equipped with lighting for night practice and/or games.

The grass used for the football practice fields are GameDay Grass 3D and were supplied by GeneralSports Venue (GSV). GameDay Grass 3D is a form of astroturf. GameDay is also used by the Buffalo Bills, Toronto Blue Jays, and Tampa Bay Rays.

== NCAA Field Hockey Final Four ==
The Powhatan Sports Complex has received national attention and has hosted the 2012, 2013 and 2016 NCAA Field Hockey Final Four. This will be the fourth time the event will on the campus of Old Dominion University, with previous events being held at Foreman Field in 1985, 1986, and 2000.
