= Ohio State Buckeyes field hockey =

Field hockey team of Ohio State University

- University: Ohio State University
- Conference: Big Ten Conference
- Head coach: Jarred Martin (10th season)
- Field: Capacity: 500
- Location: Columbus, Ohio
- Colors: Scarlet and gray

Conference Tournament championships
- 2001

Conference regular season championships
- 2001, 2006, 2010

The Ohio State Buckeyes field hockey is the official team that is the intercollegiate field hockey program representing Ohio State University. The school competes in the Big Ten Conference in Division I of the National Collegiate Athletic Association (NCAA). The Ohio State field hockey team plays its home games at Buckeye Varsity Field on the university campus in Columbus, Ohio. Since the establishment of the field hockey program in 1971, the Buckeyes have won three Big Ten conference regular-season championships, one conference tournament title, and have appeared in the NCAA tournament seven times. The team is currently coached by Jarred Martin.

== History ==
Field hockey has been a varsity sport at Ohio State University since 1971. From 1982 to 1988 and again from 1992 to the present, Ohio State has played in the Big Ten Conference. Between 1989 and 1991, the team played in the Midwestern Collegiate Field Hockey Conference. The Buckeyes have won three regular-season Big Ten championships, in 2001, 2006, and 2010, and one Big Ten conference tournament title, in 2001. Ohio State has also made seven appearances in the NCAA tournament, advancing past the first round twice, and once reaching the semifinals, in 2010. The Buckeyes are currently coached by Anne Wilkinson, who is in her 19th season as the team's head coach. Prior to her tenure, Ohio State had previously been coached by Mary Raysa (1971–72), Harriet Reynolds (1973–86), and Karen Weaver (1987–95).

=== Season-by-season results ===
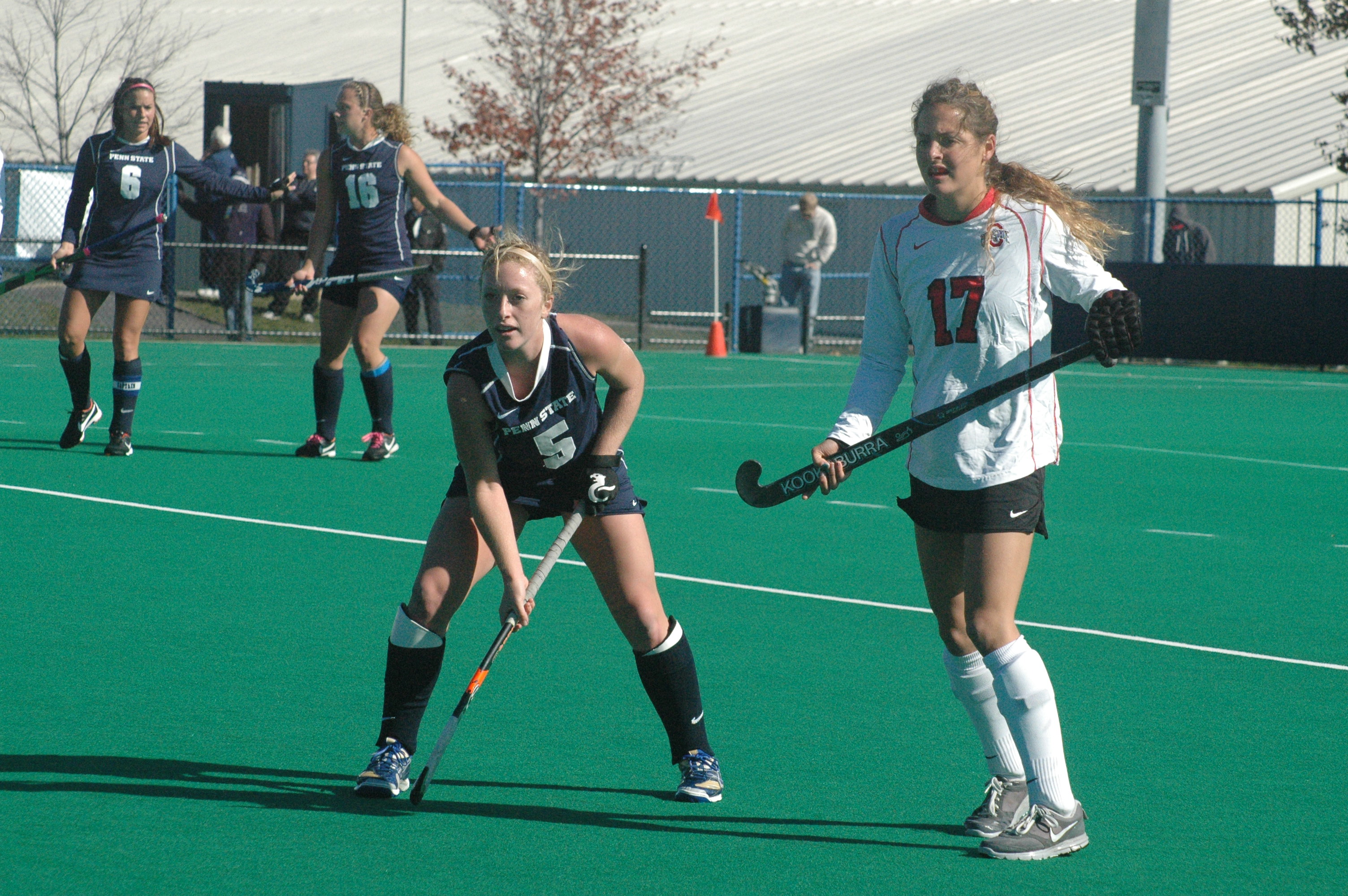
The 2011 Ohio State team in action against Penn State during the Big Ten Field Hockey Tournament

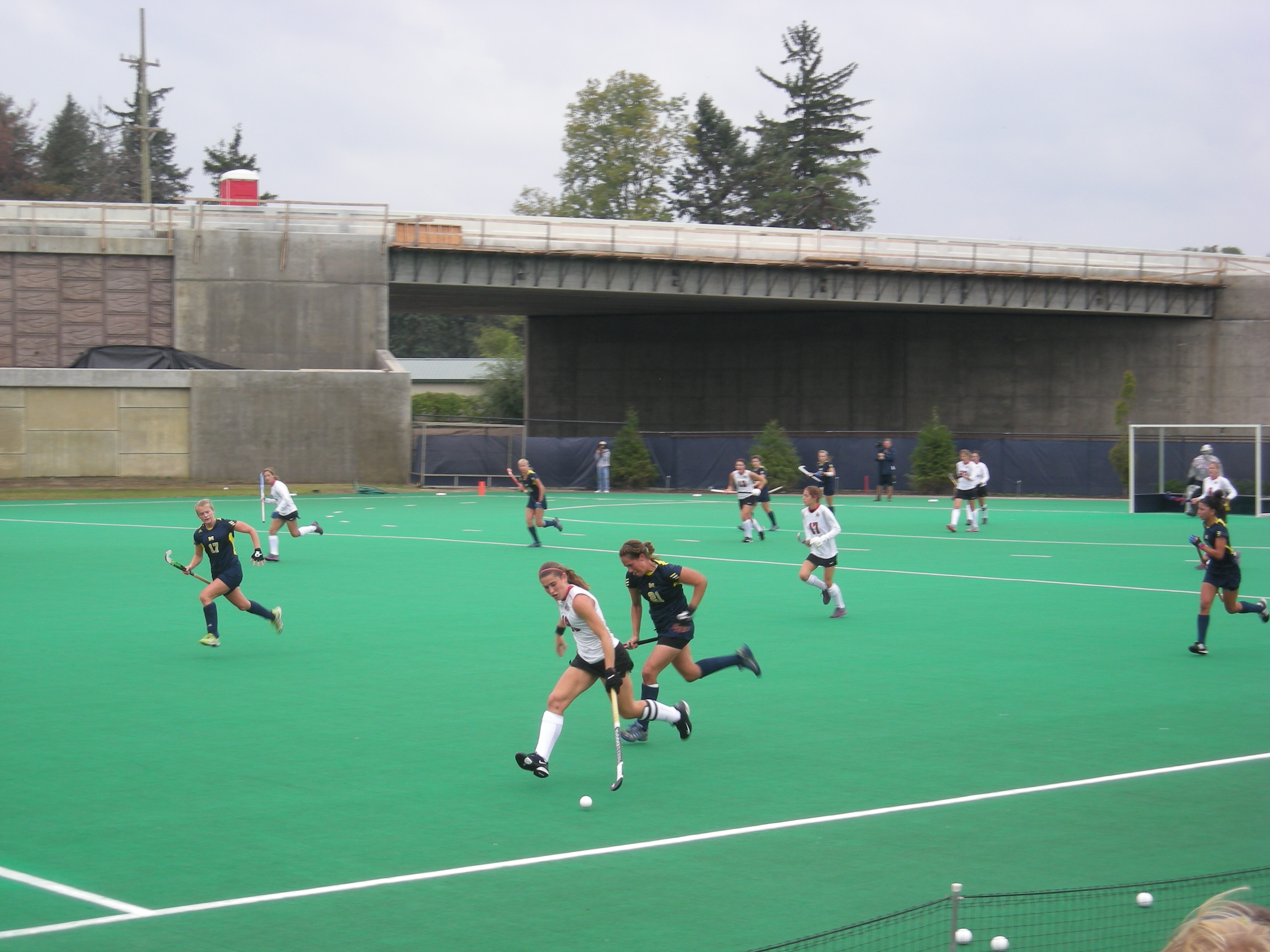
The 2012 Ohio State team in action at Michigan

Year	Head coach	Overall	Pct.	Conf.	Pct.	Conf. Place	Conf. Tourn.	Postseason
1971	Mary Raysa	5–4–1	.550	–	–	–	–	–
1972	Mary Raysa	6–4–3	.577	–	–	–	–	–
1973	Harriet Reynolds	11–2–1	.821	–	–	–	–	–
1974	Harriet Reynolds	12–3–1	.781	–	–	–	–	–
1975	Harriet Reynolds	9–7	.563	–	–	–	–	–
1976	Harriet Reynolds	17–5	.773	–	–	–	–	AIAW 2nd Round
1977	Harriet Reynolds	11–3–2	.750	–	–	–	–	–
1978	Harriet Reynolds	13–5–2	.700	–	–	–	–	–
1979	Harriet Reynolds	12–5–2	.684	–	–	–	–	–
1980	Harriet Reynolds	12–9–2	.565	–	–	–	–	–
1981	Harriet Reynolds	12–18	.400	–	–	–	7th	–
1982	Harriet Reynolds	8–10	.444	1–4	.200	5th	–	–
1983	Harriet Reynolds	5–16–4	.280	2–8	.200	5th	–	–
1984	Harriet Reynolds	8–13–3	.396	4–4–2	.500	3rd	–	–
1985	Harriet Reynolds	9–9–2	.500	4–4–2	.500	3rd	–	–
1986	Harriet Reynolds	3–12–5	.275	0–7–3	.150	5th	–	–
1987	Karen Weaver	5–12–2	.316	1–8–1	.150	6th	–	–
1988	Karen Weaver	4–12–5	.310	2–4–2	.375	3rd	–	–
1989	Karen Weaver	7–11	.389	2–8	.200	6th	–	–
1990	Karen Weaver	6–11–2	.368	4–6	.400	T3rd	–	–
1991	Karen Weaver	14–6–1	.690	6–3–1	.650	T2nd	–	–
1992	Karen Weaver	8–10	.444	4–6	.400	3rd	–	–
1993	Karen Weaver	8–12	.400	3–7	.300	3rd	–	–
1994	Karen Weaver	14–7	.667	5–5	.500	4th	–	NCAA 1st Round
1995	Karen Weaver	10–9	.526	3–7	.300	5th	–	–
1996	Anne Wilkinson	13–7	.650	6–4	.600	T2nd	–	–
1997	Anne Wilkinson	11–9	.550	6–4	.600	3rd	–	–
1998	Anne Wilkinson	12–8	.600	5–5	.500	3rd	–	–
1999	Anne Wilkinson	12–7	.632	4–6	.400	4th	–	–
2000	Anne Wilkinson	12–8	.600	3–3	.500	T3rd	–	–
2001	Anne Wilkinson	15–5	.750	5–1	.833	T1st	Champions	NCAA 1st Round
2002	Anne Wilkinson	8–10	.444	2–4	.333	5th	–	–
2003	Anne Wilkinson	13–7	.650	4–2	.667	3rd	–	–
2004	Anne Wilkinson	10–10	.500	1–5	.167	6th	–	–
2005	Anne Wilkinson	15–7	.682	3–3	.500	3rd	–	NCAA 1st Round
2006	Anne Wilkinson	15–4	.789	5–1	.833	1st	–	NCAA 2nd Round
2007	Anne Wilkinson	6–12	.333	2–4	.333	5th	–	–
2008	Anne Wilkinson	14–7	.667	3–3	.500	T4th	–	–
2009	Anne Wilkinson	13–7	.650	4–2	.667	T2nd	–	NCAA 1st Round
2010	Anne Wilkinson	18–5	.783	5–1	.833	T1st	Runner-up	NCAA Final Four
2011	Anne Wilkinson	12–9	.571	4–2	.667	T2nd	–	NCAA 1st Round
2012	Anne Wilkinson	10–9	.526	2–4	.333	T5th	–	–
2013	Anne Wilkinson	6–13	.316	0–6	.000	7th	–	–
2014	Anne Wilkinson	6–12	.333	1–7	.125	T8th	–	–
2015	Anne Wilkinson	9–10	.474	4–4	.500	5th	–	–
2016	Anne Wilkinson	6–11	.353	1–7	.125	8th	–	–
2017	Jarred Martin	10–9	.526	2–6	.250		–	–
2018	Jarred Martin	12–8	.600	5–5	.500		–	–
2019	Jarred Martin	9–9	.500	3–6	.333		–	–
2020	Jarred Martin	7–9	.438	2–5	.286	7th	–	–
2021	Jarred Martin	7–11	.389	1–7	.125	8th	–	–
2022	Jarred Martin	11–8	.579	3–5	.375	T7th	–	–

Season-by-season results through the end of the 2014 season

== Awards and accolades ==
=== Conference championships ===
Ohio State has won three conference titles, all in the Big Ten Conference and under the guidance of head coach Anne Wilkinson.

Year	Coach	Conference Record	Overall Record	Conference	NCAA Result
2001	Anne Wilkinson	5–1	15–5	Big Ten	NCAA 1st Round
2006	Anne Wilkinson	5–1	15–4	Big Ten	NCAA 2nd Round
2010	Anne Wilkinson	5–1	18–5	Big Ten	NCAA Final Four
3 Conference Championships; 3 Big Ten Championships

=== All-Americans ===
Key
First-team selection	Second-team selection	Third-team selection

Season	Player	Remarks
1977	Sue Marcellus	
1978	Sue Marcellus	Second first-team selection
1979	Sue Marcellus	Third first-team selection
1994	Dawn Pederson	
1996	Britta Eickhoff	
1997	Britta Eickhoff	Second selection
1999	Katie Hobson	
2000	Katie Hobson	Second selection
2000	Marjie van Nouhuys	
2001	Vanessa Immordino	
2001	Marjie van Nouhuys	Second selection

Season	Player	Remarks
2002	Vanessa Immordino	Second selection
2003	Vanessa Immordino	Third selection
2004	Saskia Mueller	
2005	Leticia Fragapane	
2005	Yesenia Luces	
2005	Saskia Mueller	Second selection
2006	Linda Haussener	
2006	Yesenia Luces	Second selection
2006	Saskia Mueller	Third selection

Season	Player	Remarks
2007	Linda Haussener	Second selection
2007	Yesenia Luces	Third selection; Second first-team selection
2008	Linda Haussener	Third selection
2009	Berta Queralt	
2010	Aisling Coyle	
2010	Berta Queralt	Second selection
2011	Jenn Sciulli	

=== Olympians ===
Olympics	Player	Country
1980	Sue Marcellus	United States

Individual honors through the end of the 2014 season

== Stadium ==
Ohio State has played its home games at Buckeye Varsity Field since its opening in August 2010. The field's permanent bleacher seating gives it a capacity of 500, and it features an AstroTurf 12 playing surface. Located adjacent to the Woody Hayes Athletic Center, the university's indoor strength and conditioning facility, Buckeye Varsity Field features 3/8" closed-cell perforated foam padding as well as a press box and a scoreboard. The Buckeyes' home field hockey locker rooms are located at the adjacent Biggs Athletic Facility, which also provides the team with a full-service athletic training room. Visiting teams typically utilize the locker rooms at Buckeye Field, the home of the Ohio State softball team.

== See also ==
- List of NCAA Division I field hockey programs
