= Trager Stadium =

Kentucky Field Hockey Stadium

Coordinates: 38°12′54″N 85°45′14″W

Trager Stadium is a field hockey stadium located in Louisville, Kentucky, located on the campus of the University of Louisville in Owsley B. Frazier Cardinal Park between the track and field/soccer stadium and the softball stadium. Trager Stadium serves home to the Louisville cardinals field hockey team and can seat 1,500 spectators in the aluminum bleacher system. The stadium is named after the Trager family, who donated money to the university.

== History ==
Trager Stadium opened in 2000 along with the other sports facilities in Cardinal Park. Trager Stadium is solely dedicated to the field hockey team and has been considered since opening "a premier championship venue."

=== Renovations ===
Since the time of Trager Stadium opening, there have been multiple additions and renovations. A climate-controlled press box was built prior to the 2002 NCAA Championship. In years to follow in August 2008, Trager stadium underwent a large expansion and renovations. The expansion included the addition of the Trager Field Hockey complex that added offices for the field hockey coaches and staff, locker rooms for both the home team and an away team, and storage/mechanical space. The second part of the expansion included the Marshall Center. The Marshall Center is a two-floored strength and conditioning facility available to all student-athletes attending the University of Louisville. The bottom floor is 7,000-square feet of weight and strength training, while the top contains over 1,000-square feet of cardio training equipment, four lifting racks, and an office/meeting space for the Sports Performance staff. The Marshall Center can accommodate around 70 athletes at one time on the main floor alone. This large, versatile space allows for multiple training sessions to occur simultaneously, lending itself to building a stronger community between and across sports teams. It is also home to a Gatorade Fueling Station, which is stocked with dozens of food items strategically selected to meet the student-athletes nutritional needs following their training sessions. Trager stadium had AstroTurf's state-of-the-art synthetic turf installed in 2011. The specific type of turf is AstroTurf 12, part of the classic series which is a field hockey exclusive turf. This type of synthetic turf is knitted nylon fibers making it the most durable and uniform. The nylon fibers are durable and hydrophilic (absorbs water), making for exceptional wet play.

== Events ==
The stadium has been holding University of Louisville field hockey games since opening, but since then Trager Stadium has served home to many championships games. Trager Stadium served as the host site for six NCAA Division I Championships in 2002, 2005, 2008, 2011, 2017, 2018. Trager also hosted three NCAA Division II Championships in 2010, 2014, 2017, and was home to the 2006 and 2012 Big East Championship.

== Field hockey team ==
The University of Louisville field hockey team is in the NCAA Division I and belongs to the Atlantic Coast Conference (AAC). The coaching staff is, head coach Justine Sowry, assistant coach Malachi Mahan, assistant coach Will Holt and director of operations Debbie Bell. The University of Louisville offers athletic scholarships for field hockey and need-based academic scholarships for student-athletes. The University of Louisville offers athletic scholarships for field hockey and need-based academic scholarships for student-athletes. Recruitment is an important thing in joining the University of Louisville field hockey team.
