= Field hockey at the 1995 Pan American Games – Women's tournament =

Women's field hockey at the 1995 Pan American Games
Tournament details
- Host country: Argentina
- City: Mar del Plata
- Dates: 12–25 July
- Teams: 7
- Venue: Sintético De Agua

Final positions
- Champions: Argentina (3rd title)
- Runner-up: United States
- Third place: Canada

Tournament statistics
- Matches played: 23
- Goals scored: 92 (4 per match)

The women's field hockey tournament at the 1995 Pan American Games was the 3rd edition of the field hockey event for women at the Pan American Games. It was held over a thirteen-day period beginning on 12 July, and culminating with the medal finals on 25 July. All games were played at the Sintético De Agua in Mar del Plata, Argentina.

Argentina won the gold medal for the third time after defeating the United States 3–2 in the final. Canada won the bronze medal by defeating Cuba 4–0.

The tournament served as the Pan American qualifier for the 1996 Summer Olympics in Atlanta, United States.

== Teams ==
Including the host nation, who received an automatic berth, seven teams participated in the tournament.

- Argentina
- Canada
- Cuba
- Jamaica
- Paraguay
- Trinidad and Tobago
- United States

== Results ==
All times are local (ART).

=== Preliminary round ===
Pos	Team	Pld	W	D	L	GF	GA	GD	Pts	Qualification
1	United States	6	5	1	0	29	1	+28	11	Gold-medal match
2	Argentina (H)	6	5	1	0	26	1	+25	11	Gold-medal match
3	Canada	6	4	0	2	14	5	+9	8	Bronze-medal match
4	Cuba	6	3	0	3	7	14	−7	6	Bronze-medal match
5	Trinidad and Tobago	6	1	1	4	5	11	−6	3	
6	Jamaica	6	1	1	4	2	14	−12	3	
7	Paraguay	6	0	0	6	0	37	−37	0	

Source: LA84 Foundation
(H) Hosts

==== Fixtures ====
12 March 1995
12:00

Trinidad and Tobago	0–1	Canada
	Report	Anderson 51'

Umpires:
L. Rodríguez (ARG)
Jane Nockolds (ENG)

12 March 1995
14:00

Argentina	8–0	Paraguay
Aicega 4', 29'; Masotta 6', 31', 46'; Castelli 25'; Oneto 44'; MacKenzie 51'	Report

Umpires:
Margaret Lanning (CAN)
P. Prendergast (JAM)

13 March 1995
10:00

Cuba	1–0	Jamaica
De Los Arcos 69'	Report

Umpires:
Judith Brinsfield (USA)
E. Moretta (PAR)

13 March 1995
12:00

Canada	0–2	United States
	Report	Martin 17'; Pankratz 24'

Umpires:
Lynette Farrell (NZL)
Cherril Franco (TTO)

14 March 1995
10:00

Trinidad and Tobago	0–1	Argentina
	Report	Oneto 41'

Umpires:
Judith Brinsfield (USA)
Margaret Lanning (CAN)

14 March 1995
12:00

United States	5–0	Cuba
Pankratz 6'; James 13'; Fuchs 27', 52'; Tchou 33'	Report

Umpires:
P. Prendergast (JAM)
L. Rodríguez (ARG)

14 March 1995
14:00

Paraguay	0–2	Jamaica
	Report	Stephenson 25'; May 63'

Umpires:
E. Moretta (CAN)
Cherril Franco (TTO)

15 March 1995
12:00

Argentina	3–0	Canada
Castelli 14'; Oneto 39'; Gambero 45'	Report

Umpires:
Judith Brinsfield (USA)
Jane Nockolds (ENG)

15 March 1995
14:00

Paraguay	0–4	Trinidad and Tobago
	Report	Whiteman 12'; Wellington 31'; Siu Butt 40'; Nancoo 41'

Umpires:
L. Rodríguez (ARG)
Lynette Farrell (NZL)

17 March 1995
15:30

Jamaica	0–4	United States
	Report	Pankratz 5', 43'; Marois 22'; Stone 65'

Umpires:
Cherril Franco (TTO)
L. Rodríguez (ARG)

17 March 1995
17:30

Canada	3–0	Cuba
Somerville 29'; Reid 30'; Anderson 63'	Report

Umpires:
E. Moretta (ARG)
P. Prendergast (JAM)

18 March 1995
15:30

Jamaica	0–0	Trinidad and Tobago
	Report

Umpires:
Margaret Lanning (CAN)
Judith Brinsfield (USA)

18 March 1995
17:30

United States	1–1	Argentina
Lyness 69'	Report	Masotta 65'

Umpires:
Lynette Farrell (NZL)
Jane Nockolds (ENG)

19 March 1995
15:30

Canada	9–0	Paraguay
Hill 5'; MacFarlane 20'; Reid 22', 31', 33'; Colaco 26'; Planella 45'; Anderson 50'; Hunter 69'	Report

Umpires:
P. Prendergast (JAM)
Lynette Farrell (NZL)

19 March 1995
17:30

Trinidad and Tobago	1–3	Cuba
Hinds 66'	Report	Yaq. Drake 26', 69'; De Los Arcos 65'

Umpires:
Margaret Lanning (CAN)
Jane Nockolds (ENG)

20 March 1995
15:30

Argentina	8–0	Jamaica
Oneto 12', 40'; Almada 20', 58', 66'; Camardón 42', 56'; Sánchez 63'	Report

Umpires:
Lynette Farrell (NZL)
Margaret Lanning (CAN)

20 March 1995
17:30

Paraguay	0–11	United States
	Report	Tchou 3'; Fuchs 15', 34'; Pankratz 24'; Stone 36', 45', 51'; Marois 41', 69'; Lucas 42'; Werley 67'

Umpires:
Jane Nockolds (ENG)
E. Moretta (ARG)

22 March 1995
11:30

Cuba	0–5	Argentina
	Report	Aicega 4'; Masotta 39'; Oneto 45', 48'; MacKenzie 46'

Umpires:
Cherril Franco (TTO)
Jane Nockolds (ENG)

22 March 1995
13:30

Jamaica	0–1	Canada
	Report	Anderson 30'

Umpires:
L. Rodríguez (ARG)
E. Moretta (ARG)

23 March 1995
11:30

United States	6–0	Trinidad and Tobago
Martin 5', 59'; Marois 15'; James 28'; Werley 34'; Stone 39'	Report

Umpires:
E. Moretta (ARG)
P. Prendergast (JAM)

23 March 1995
13:30

Cuba	3–0	Paraguay
Yaq. Drake 30', 62'; De Los Arcos 51'	Report

Umpires:
Cherril Franco (TTO)
Judith Brinsfield (USA)

=== Classification matches ===
==== Bronze-medal match ====
25 March 1995
11:30

Canada	4–0	Cuba
Sewell 24'; Planella 45', 66'; MacNeill 58'	Report

Umpires:
Judith Brinsfield (USA)
L. Rodríguez (ARG)

==== Gold medal match ====
25 March 1995
14:00

United States	2–3	Argentina
James 28'; Pankratz 69'	Report 1 Report 2	Sánchez 23'; Oneto 61'; Castelli 66'

Umpires:
Margaret Lanning (CAN)
Lynette Farrell (NZL)

Team details

United States
Argentina

GK	1	Mariana Arnal
DF	4	Silvina Corvalán
DF	2	Sofía MacKenzie
DF	15	Marisa López
MF	6	Julieta Castellán
MF	8	Gabriela Sánchez
MF	5	Anabel Gambero
FW	10	Jorgelina Rimoldi
FW	11	Karina Masotta
FW	9	Vanina Oneto
FW	12	María Paula Castelli
Substitutions:
DF	3	Magdalena Aicega	Substituted on
FW	7	Gabriela Pando	Substituted on
Manager:
(Argentina) Rodolfo Mendoza

== Final rankings ==
Pos	Team	Pld	W	D	L	GF	GA	GD	Pts	Qualification
1st place, gold medalist(s)	Argentina (H)	7	6	1	0	29	3	+26	13	Qualified to 1996 Summer Olympics
2nd place, silver medalist(s)	United States	7	5	1	1	31	4	+27	11	
3rd place, bronze medalist(s)	Canada	7	5	0	2	18	5	+13	10	
4	Cuba	7	3	0	4	7	18	−11	6	
5	Trinidad and Tobago	6	1	1	4	5	11	−6	3	
6	Jamaica	6	1	1	4	2	14	−12	3	
7	Paraguay	6	0	0	6	0	37	−37	0	

Source: LA84 Foundation
(H) Hosts

== Goalscorers ==
There were 92 goals scored in 23 matches, for an average of 4 goals per match.

8 goals

- (Argentina) Vanina Oneto

6 goals

- (United States) Marcia Pankratz

5 goals

- (Argentina) Karina Masotta
- (United States) Eleanor Stone

4 goals

- (Canada) Dana Anderson
- (Canada) Susan Reid
- (Cuba) Yaquelin Drake Torres
- (United States) Tracey Fuchs
- (United States) Barbara Marois

3 goals

- (Argentina) Magdalena Aicega
- (Argentina) Valeria Almada
- (Argentina) María Castelli
- (Canada) Veronica Planella
- (Cuba) Lazaro de Los Arcos
- (United States) Kelli James
- (United States) Laurel Martin

2 goals

- (Argentina) María Camardón
- (Argentina) Sofía MacKenzie
- (Argentina) Gabriela Sánchez
- (United States) Elizabeth Tchou
- (United States) Cindy Werley

1 goal

- (Argentina) Anabel Gambero
- (Canada) Nicole Colaco
- (Canada) Sarah Hill
- (Canada) Chris Hunter
- (Canada) Amy MacFarlane
- (Canada) Karen MacNeill
- (Canada) Gillian Sewell
- (Canada) Carla Somerville
- (Jamaica) Erica May
- (Jamaica) Andrea Stephenson
- (Trinidad and Tobago) Margaret Hinds
- (Trinidad and Tobago) Tamara Nancoo
- (Trinidad and Tobago) Stacey-Ann Siu Butt
- (Trinidad and Tobago) Karen Wellington
- (Trinidad and Tobago) Carol Wynn Whiteman
- (United States) Antoinette Lucas
- (United States) Leslie Lyness
