= Field hockey at the 1995 Pan American Games =

- Start date: 12 March 1995
- End date: 25 March 1995
- Teams: 14

Field hockey at the 1995 Pan American Games in Mar del Plata took place from 12 to 25 March 1995. It served as a qualification tournament for the 1996 Summer Olympics in Atlanta, Georgia. The number one earned a ticket for the Olympic tournament. The men competed for the eighth time at the Pan Americans, the women for the third time.

== Medal summary ==
=== Medalists ===
Event	Gold	Silver	Bronze
Men's tournament (details)	Argentina; Maximiliano Caldas; Diego Chiodo; Alejandro Doherty; Fernando Falchetto; Gustavo Keenan; Patricio Keenan; Jorge Lombi; Pablo Lombi; Gabriel Minadeo; Pablo Moreira; Fernando Moresi; Edgardo Pailos; Rodolfo Pérez; Jorge Querejeta; Carlos Retegui; Rodolfo Schmitt	Canada; Alan Brahmst; Patrick Burrows; Paul Chohan; Robin D'Abreo; John DeSouza; Rob Edamura; Chris Gifford; Minder Gill; Andrew Griffiths; Doug Harris; Hari Kant; Peter Milkovich; Ken Pereira; Rick Roberts; Andre Rousseau; Rob Short	United States; Larry Amar; Nick Butcher; Steve Danielson; Jeff Horrocks; Steve Jennings; Paul Lewis; Olaf Maack; Ben Maruquin; Marq Mellor; Jon O'Haire; John O'Neill; Otto Steffers; Phil Sykes; Nigel Traverso; Taylor Trickle; Steve Wagner
Women's tournament (details)	Argentina; Magdalena Aicega; Valeria Almada; Mariana Arnal; María Camardón; Julieta Castellán; María Castelli; Silvia Corvalán; Anabel Gambero; Marisa López; Sofía MacKenzie; Karina Masotta; Vanina Oneto; Gabriela Pando; María Perrone; Jorgelina Rimoldi; Gabriela Sánchez	United States; Pamela Bustin; Kristen Fillat; Tracey Fuchs; Kelli James; Antoinette Lucas; Leslie Lyness; Barbara Marois; Laurel Martin; Pamela Neiss; Marcia Pankratz; Jill Reeve; Patricia Shea; Eleanor Stone; Elizabeth Tchou; Cindy Werley; Andrea Wieland	Canada; Dana Anderson; Michelle Bowyer; Nicole Colaco; Tara Croxford; Sian Davies; Lisa Faust; Sarah Hill; Chris Hunter; Amy MacFarlane; Karen MacNeill; Veronica Planella; Sue Reid; Gillian Sewell; Carla Somerville; Krista Thompson; Deb Whitten

=== Medal table ===
* Host nation (Argentina)

Rank	Nation	Gold	Silver	Bronze	Total
1	Argentina*	2	0	0	2
2	Canada	0	1	1	2
2	United States	0	1	1	2
Totals (3 entries)		2	2	2	6

== Men's tournament ==
The competition consisted of two stages; a preliminary round followed by a classification round.

=== Participating nations ===
- Argentina
- Canada
- Chile
- Cuba
- Paraguay
- Trinidad and Tobago
- United States

=== Preliminary round ===
Pos	Team	Pld	W	D	L	GF	GA	GD	Pts	Qualification
1	Argentina (H)	6	5	1	0	42	3	+39	11	Gold-medal match
2	Canada	6	4	2	0	31	3	+28	10	Gold-medal match
3	Cuba	6	3	2	1	24	7	+17	8	Bronze-medal match
4	United States	6	3	1	2	26	9	+17	7	Bronze-medal match
5	Trinidad and Tobago	6	2	0	4	11	29	−18	4	
6	Chile	6	1	0	5	8	19	−11	2	
7	Paraguay	6	0	0	6	1	73	−72	0	

Source: LA84 Foundation
(H) Hosts

=== Classification matches ===
==== Bronze-medal match ====
25 March 1995
09:00
v

Cuba	2–3	United States
	Report

Umpires:
W. Garbal (PAR)
Gary Belder (AUS)

==== Gold-medal match ====
25 March 1995
16:30
v

Argentina	1–0	Canada
	Report

Umpires:
Roger St. Rose (TTO)
Antonio Morales (ESP)

=== Final standings ===
Rank	Team
1st place, gold medalist(s)	Argentina
2nd place, silver medalist(s)	Canada
3rd place, bronze medalist(s)	United States
4	Cuba
5	Trinidad and Tobago
6	Chile
7	Paraguay

Qualified for the 1996 Summer Olympics

== Women's tournament ==
The competition consisted of two stages; a preliminary round followed by a classification round.

=== Participating nations ===
- Argentina
- Canada
- Cuba
- Jamaica
- Paraguay
- Trinidad and Tobago
- United States

=== Preliminary round ===
Pos	Team	Pld	W	D	L	GF	GA	GD	Pts	Qualification
1	United States	6	5	1	0	29	1	+28	11	Gold-medal match
2	Argentina (H)	6	5	1	0	26	1	+25	11	Gold-medal match
3	Canada	6	4	0	2	14	5	+9	8	Bronze-medal match
4	Cuba	6	3	0	3	7	14	−7	6	Bronze-medal match
5	Trinidad and Tobago	6	1	1	4	5	11	−6	3	
6	Jamaica	6	1	1	4	2	14	−12	3	
7	Paraguay	6	0	0	6	0	37	−37	0	

Source: LA84 Foundation
(H) Hosts

=== Classification matches ===
==== Bronze-medal match ====
25 March 1995
11:30
v

Canada	4–0	Cuba
	Report

Umpires:
Judith Brinsfield (USA)
L. Rodríguez (ARG)

==== Gold-medal match ====
25 March 1995
14:00
v

United States	2–3	Argentina
	Report

Umpires:
Margaret Lanning (CAN)
Lynette Farrell (NZL)

=== Final standings ===
Rank	Team
1st place, gold medalist(s)	Argentina
2nd place, silver medalist(s)	United States
3rd place, bronze medalist(s)	Canada
4	Cuba
5	Trinidad and Tobago
6	Jamaica
7	Paraguay
