= Field hockey at the 1995 Pan American Games – Men's tournament =

Men's field hockey at the 1995 Pan American Games
Tournament details
- Host country: Argentina
- City: Mar del Plata
- Dates: 12–25 July
- Teams: 7
- Venue: Sintético De Agua

Final positions
- Champions: Argentina (6th title)
- Runner-up: United States
- Third place: Canada

Tournament statistics
- Matches played: 23
- Goals scored: 149 (6.48 per match)
- Top scorer: (United States) Marq Mellor (13 goals)

The men's field hockey tournament at the 1995 Pan American Games was the 8th edition of the field hockey event for men at the Pan American Games. It was held over a thirteen-day period beginning on 12 July, and culminating with the medal finals on 25 July. All games were played at the Sintético De Agua in Mar del Plata, Argentina.

Argentina won the gold medal for a record sixth time after defeating Canada 1–0 in the final. The United States won the bronze medal by defeating Cuba 3–2.

The tournament served as the Pan American qualifier for the 1996 Summer Olympics in Atlanta, United States.

== Teams ==
Including the host nation, who received an automatic berth, seven teams participated in the tournament.

- Argentina
- Canada
- Chile
- Cuba
- Paraguay
- Trinidad and Tobago
- United States

== Results ==
All times are local (ART).

=== Preliminary round ===
Pos	Team	Pld	W	D	L	GF	GA	GD	Pts	Qualification
1	Argentina (H)	6	5	1	0	42	3	+39	11	Gold Medal Match
2	Canada	6	4	2	0	31	3	+28	10	Gold Medal Match
3	Cuba	6	3	2	1	24	7	+17	8	Bronze Medal Match
4	United States	6	3	1	2	26	9	+17	7	Bronze Medal Match
5	Trinidad and Tobago	6	2	0	4	11	29	−18	4	
6	Chile	6	1	0	5	8	19	−11	2	
7	Paraguay	6	0	0	6	1	73	−72	0	

Source: LA84 Foundation
(H) Hosts

==== Fixtures ====
12 March 1995
16:00

Argentina	12–0	Trinidad and Tobago
G. Keenan 9'; P. Keenan 12'; Caldas 14', 22'; Retegui 27', 32', 43', 45'; J. Lombi 40'; Pérez 60'; Doherty 67'; Falchetto 69'	Report

Umpires:
Antonio Morales (ESP)
C. Prince (CAN)

12 March 1995
18:00

United States	3–3	Cuba
Mellor 29', 55'; Maruquin 68'	Report	Rodríguez 24'; Reyes 63'; Delgado 67'

Umpires:
Roger St. Rose (TTO)
Edmundo Saladino (ESP)

13 March 1995
14:00

Canada	5–0	Chile
Short 30'; Milkovich 36'; Gifford 37'; Manminder 40'; DeSouza 59'	Report

Umpires:
W. Garbal (ARG)
Gary Belder (AUS)

13 March 1995
16:00

Paraguay	0–18	Argentina
	Report	Retegui 8', 20', 54', 66', 69'; J. Lombi 24', 27', 33', 41', 47'; Caldas 32'; Falchetto 34', 49', 55'; G. Keenan 51', 58'; Querejeta 61'; P. Keenan 64'

Umpires:
B. García (CUB)
T. Stewert (CAN)

13 March 1995
18:00

Cuba	5–0	Trinidad and Tobago
Marín 26'; Delgado 30', 51', 63'; Ladera 50'	Report

Umpires:
Steven Horgan (USA)
Antonio Morales (ESP)

14 March 1995
16:00

Canada	3–1	United States
Manminder 5'; Short 16'; Gifford 48'	Report	Mellor 67'

Umpires:
Antonio Morales (ESP)
Gary Belder (AUS)

14 March 1995
18:00

Chile	7–1	Paraguay
Hernández 13', 38', 39', 54'; Olmedo 17'; S. Schönborn 67'; Kramer 58'	Report	Lombardo 22'

Umpires:
Steven Horgan (USA)
Edmundo Saladino (ARG)

15 March 1995
16:00

Argentina	3–0	Cuba
J. Lombi 3', 65'; Falchetto 58'	Report

Umpires:
Roger St. Rose (TTO)
Steven Horgan (USA)

15 March 1995
18:00

Trinidad and Tobago	1–8	United States
Browne 17'	Report	Mellor 10', 22', 39', 47'; Jennings 15'; Maack 24', 40'; Lewis 47'

Umpires:
B. García (CUB)
C. Prince (CAN)

17 March 1995
11:30

Paraguay	0–17	Canada
	Report	Manminder 1', 22', 55'; Griffiths 2', 4', 5', 8', 65'; Milkovich 13'; Brahmst 14'; Burrows 15'; Chohan 33'; Gifford 38'; Pereira 41', 51'; D'Abreo 43', 50'

Umpires:
Roger St. Rose (TTO)
W. Garbal (ARG)

17 March 1995
13:30

Chile	1–6	Argentina
Hoppe 49'	Report	Retegui 13'; P. Keenan 17', 19'; Falchetto 30'; J. Lombi 61'; Caldas 67'

Umpires:
Gary Belder (AUS)
T. Stewert (CAN)

18 March 1995
11:30

Trinidad and Tobago	0–4	Canada
	Report	Griffiths 12', 22'; Short 13', 42'

Umpires:
Edmundo Saladino (ARG)
B. García (CUB)

18 March 1995
13:30

Cuba	13–0	Paraguay
Rodríguez 5', 15', 22', 60', 63', 67'; Delgado 12'; Ladera 31', 61'; Reyes 33', 46', 55'; C. Hernández 41'	Report

Umpires:
C. Prince (CAN)
Antonio Saladino (ESP)

19 March 1995
11:30

United States	1–2	Argentina
Maruquin 34'	Report	Falchetto 33', 58'

Umpires:
Gary Belder (AUS)
C. Prince (CAN)

19 March 1995
13:30

Chile	0–3	Trinidad and Tobago
	Report	Govia 31'; Al. Marcano 61'; De Silva 68'

Umpires:
T. Stewert (CAN)
W. Garbal (ARG)

20 March 1995
11:30

Paraguay	0–11	United States
	Report	Lewis 4', 14', 27'; Maruquin 23', 44', 65'; Jennings 32', 53'; Mellor 49', 67', 68'

Umpires:
B. García (CUB)
Gary Belder (AUS)

20 March 1995
13:30

Canada	1–1	Cuba
Griffiths 9'	Report	Delgado 42'

Umpires:
W. Garbal (ARG)
Antonio Morales (ESP)

22 March 1995
15:30

Cuba	2–0	Chile
Rodríguez 20'; Benavídez 48'	Report

Umpires:
Roger St. Rose (TTO)
Edmundo Saladino (ARG)

22 March 1995
17:30

Argentina	1–1	Canada
J. Lombi 20'	Report	D'Abreo 39'

Umpires:
Steven Horgan (USA)
Gary Belder (AUS)

23 March 1995
15:30

Trinidad and Tobago	7–0	Paraguay
Al. Marcano 2', 17', 38', 45', 59'; Noreiga 56'; Wills 64'	Report

Umpires:
Edmundo Saladino (ARG)
Steve Horgan (USA)

23 March 1995
17:30

United States	2–0	Chile
Jennings 34'; Mellor 40'	Report

Umpires:
C. Prince (CAN)
T. Stewert (CAN)

=== Classification matches ===
==== Bronze medal match ====
25 March 1995
09:00

Cuba	2–3	United States
Delgado 26'; Ladera 40'	Report	Mellor 30', 54'; Lewis 62'

Umpires:
W. Garbal (PAR)
Gary Belder (AUS)

==== Gold medal match ====
25 March 1995
16:30

Argentina	1–0	Canada
Falchetto 58'	Report

Umpires:
Roger St. Rose (TTO)
Antonio Morales (ESP)

== Final rankings ==
Pos	Team	Pld	W	D	L	GF	GA	GD	Pts	Qualification
1st place, gold medalist(s)	Argentina (H)	7	6	1	0	43	3	+40	13	Qualified to 1996 Summer Olympics
2nd place, silver medalist(s)	Canada	7	4	2	1	31	4	+27	10	
3rd place, bronze medalist(s)	United States	7	4	1	2	29	11	+18	9	
4	Cuba	7	3	2	2	26	10	+16	8	
5	Trinidad and Tobago	6	2	0	4	11	29	−18	4	
6	Chile	6	1	0	5	8	19	−11	2	
7	Paraguay	6	0	0	6	1	73	−72	0	

Source: LA84 Foundation
(H) Hosts
