= Phil Sykes =

Phil Sykes may refer to:

- Phil Sykes (field hockey) (born 1970), American field hockey player
- Phil Sykes (ice hockey) (born 1959), Canadian ice hockey player
