= Michigan Wolverines field hockey =

Field hockey team of the University of Michigan

- University: University of Michigan
- Conference: Big Ten Conference
- Head coach: Kristi Gannon Fisher
- Field: Capacity: 1,500
- Location: Ann Arbor, Michigan
- Colors: Maize and blue

NCAA Tournament championships
- 2001

NCAA Tournament Runner-up
- 1999, 2020

NCAA Tournament appearances
- 1999, 2000, 2001, 2002, 2003, 2004, 2005, 2007, 2010, 2011, 2012, 2015, 2016, 2017, 2018, 2019, 2020, 2021, 2022, 2024

Conference Tournament championships
- 1999, 2000, 2004, 2005, 2010, 2017, 2020, 2022, 2024

Conference regular season championships
- 1997, 2000, 2002, 2003, 2004, 2007, 2010, 2011, 2017, 2018, 2020

The Michigan Wolverines field hockey team is the intercollegiate field hockey program which is representing the University of Michigan. The school competes in the Big Ten Conference in Division I of the National Collegiate Athletic Association (NCAA). The Michigan field hockey team plays its home games at Phyllis Ocker Field on the university campus in Ann Arbor, Michigan. Michigan has won one NCAA Championship as well as eleven Big Ten regular season titles and nine Big Ten tournaments since the creation of the field hockey program in 1973. The team is currently coached by Kristi Gannon Fisher.

== History ==
Field hockey has been a varsity sport at the University of Michigan since 1973. From 1978 to 1988 and again from 1992 to the present, Michigan has played in the Big Ten Conference. Between 1989 and 1991, the team played in the Midwestern Collegiate Field Hockey Conference. The team won a number of major championships during the late 1990s and early 2000s, beginning with a Big Ten regular season title in 1997 and a Big Ten tournament championship in 1999. This streak of successes under head coach Marcia Pankratz culminated with the team's first and to date only national championship in 2001. The achievement was the first NCAA title won by a women's sports team at the University of Michigan, and was also just the second time a Midwestern university had claimed the championship after Iowa had done it first in 1986.

=== Season-by-season results ===
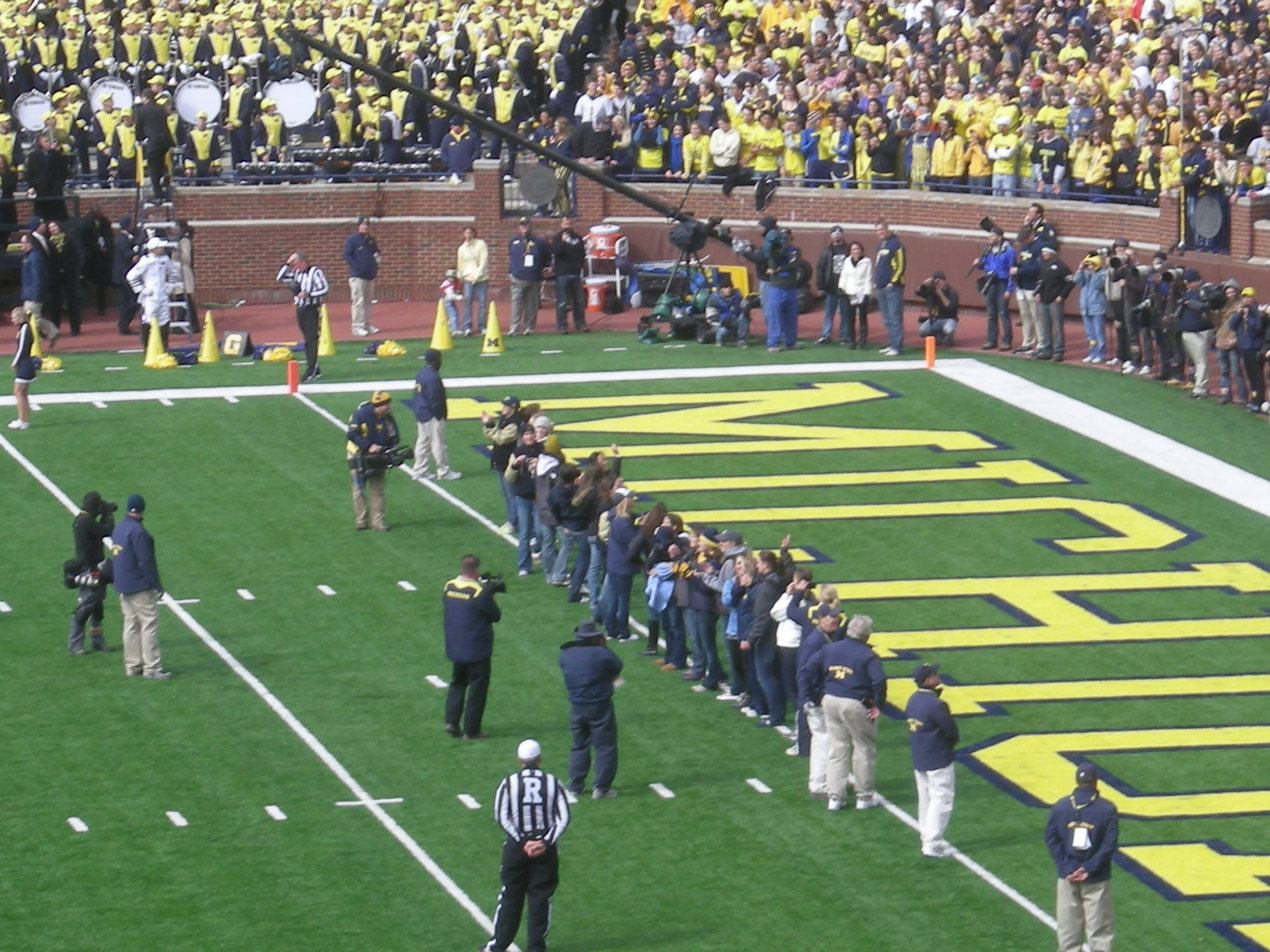
The 2001 national champion Michigan field hockey team honored at Michigan Stadium on the occasion of their 10-year reunion in 2011.

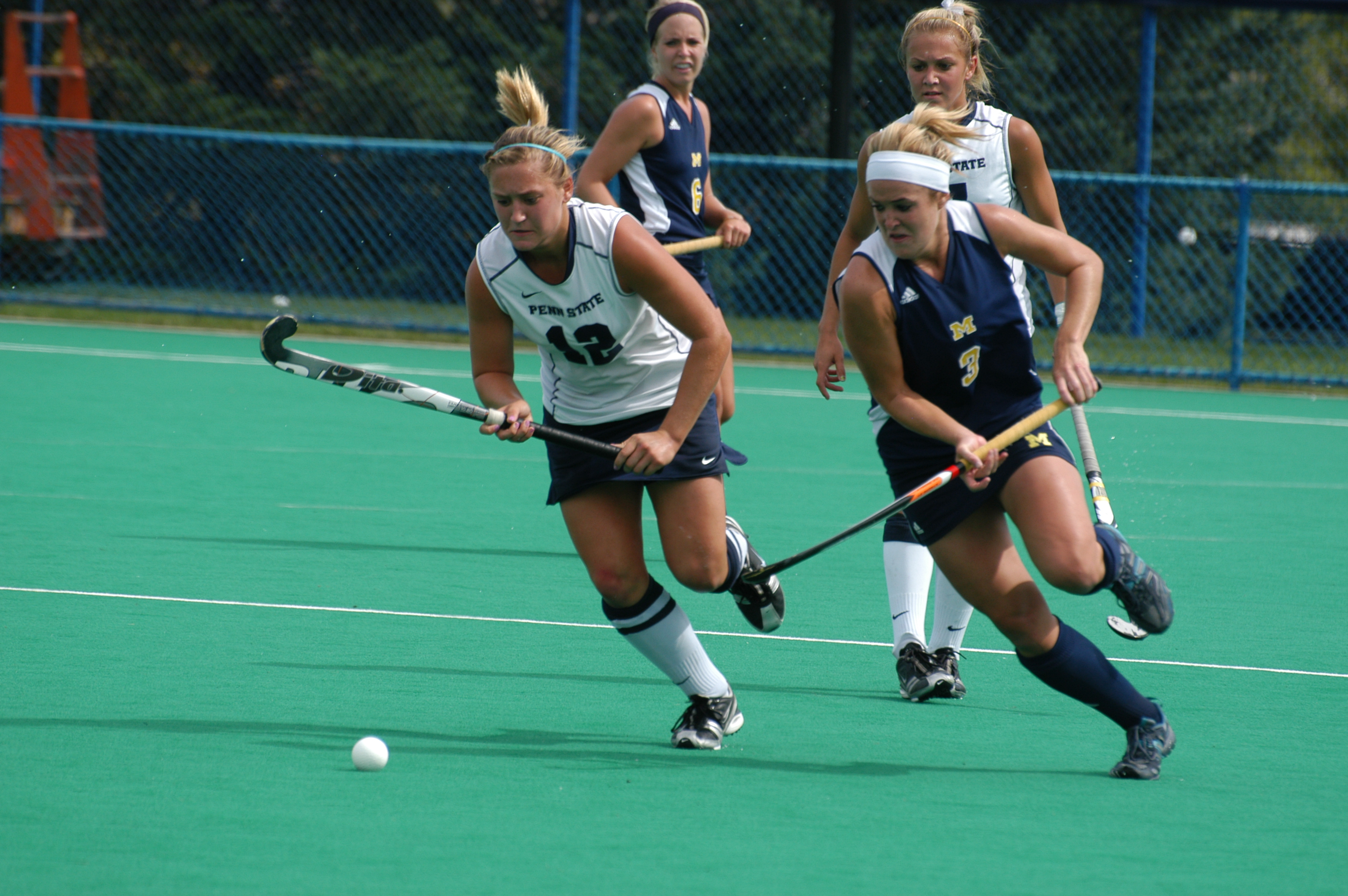
The 2010 Michigan field hockey team in action at Penn State

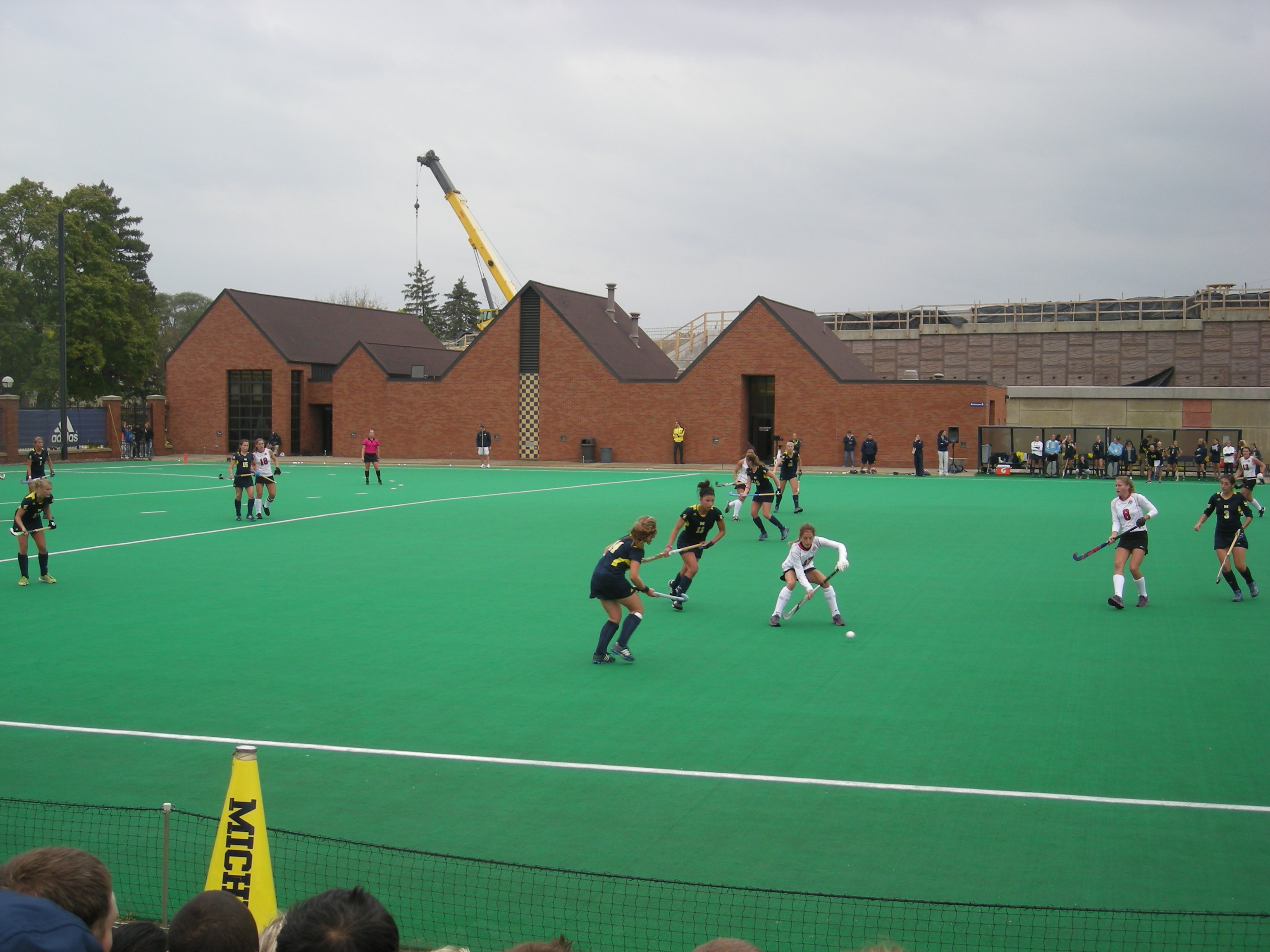
The 2012 Michigan field hockey team in action against Ohio State

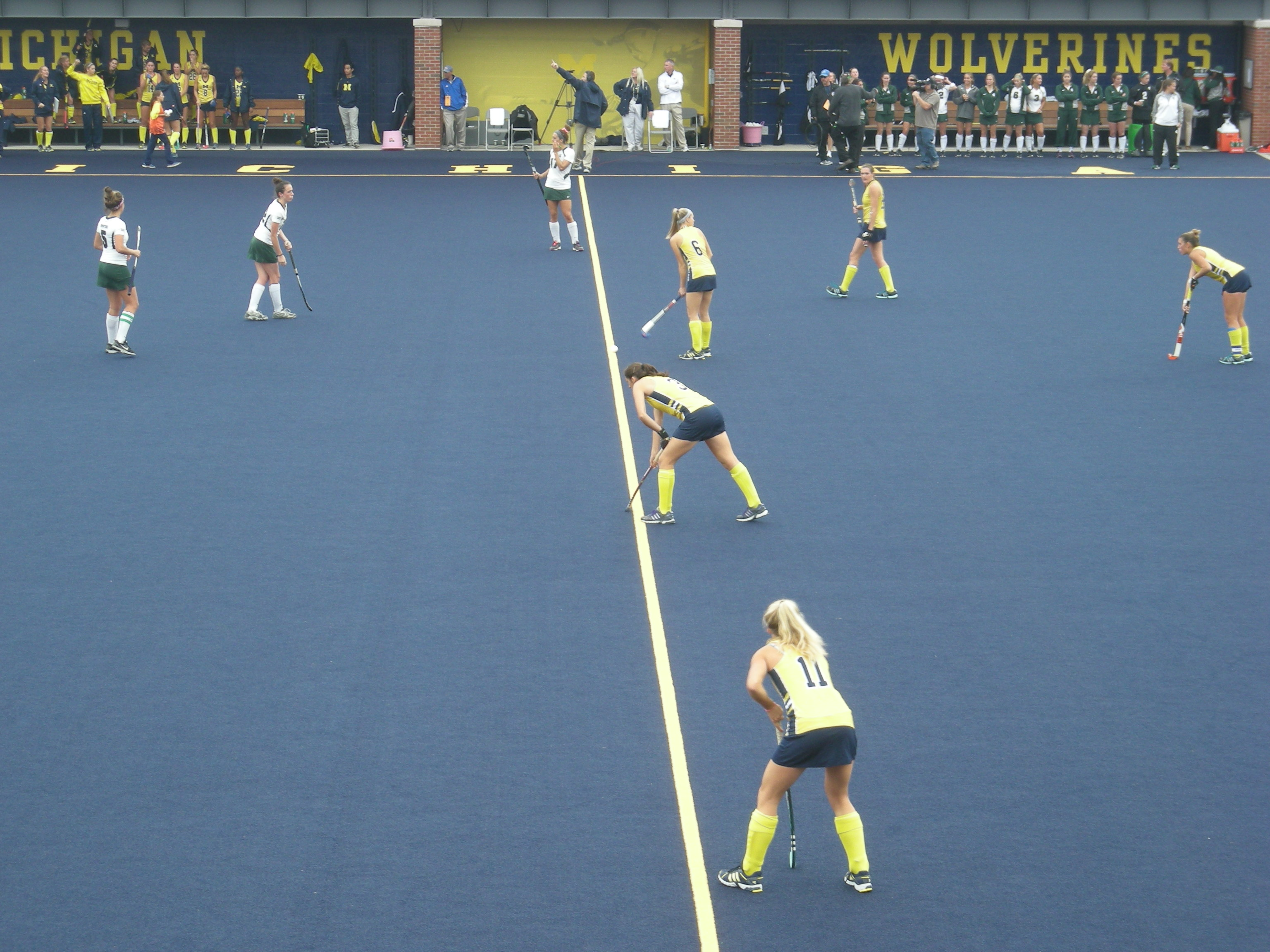
The 2014 Michigan field hockey team in action against Michigan State

| Year | Head coach | Overall | Pct. | Conf. | Pct. | Conf. Place | Conf. Tourn. | Postseason |
|---|---|---|---|---|---|---|---|---|
| 1973 | Phyllis Weikart | 1–3–1 | .300 | – | – | – | – | – |
| 1974 | Phyllis Ocker | 2–8 | .200 | – | – | – | – | – |
| 1975 | Phyllis Ocker | 5–6 | .455 | – | – | – | – | – |
| 1976 | Phyllis Ocker | 8–3 | .727 | – | – | – | – | – |
| 1977 | Phyllis Ocker | 7–8–3 | .472 | – | – | – | – | – |
| 1978 | Candy Zientek | 11–8 | .579 | – | – | – | 5th | – |
| 1979 | Candy Zientek | 13–8–1 | .614 | – | – | – | 2nd | – |
| 1980 | Candy Zientek | 11–8 | .579 | – | – | – | T7th | – |
| 1981 | Candy Zientek | 11–8–1 | .575 | – | – | – | 6th | – |
| 1982 | Candy Zientek | 13–3 | .813 | 3–2 | .600 | 3rd | – | – |
| 1983 | Karen Collins | 9–7 | .563 | 3–7 | .300 | 4th | – | – |
| 1984 | Karen Collins | 1–13–5 | .184 | 0–7–3 | .150 | T5th | – | – |
| 1985 | Karen Collins | 1–14–2 | .118 | 1–8–1 | .150 | 6th | – | – |
| 1986 | Karen Collins | 9–11–1 | .452 | 1–8–1 | .150 | T5th | – | – |
| 1987 | Karen Collins | 11–6–3 | .625 | 2–6–2 | .300 | 5th | – | – |
| 1988 | Karen Collins | 6–10–4 | .400 | 1–6–1 | .188 | T4th | – | – |
| 1989 | Patti Smith | 9–9–2 | .500 | 3–7 | .300 | 4th | – | – |
| 1990 | Patti Smith | 12–7–2 | .619 | 3–6–1 | .350 | 4th | – | – |
| 1991 | Patti Smith | 9–9 | .500 | 4–6 | .400 | 5th | – | – |
| 1992 | Patti Smith | 10–8 | .556 | 3–7 | .300 | T4th | – | – |
| 1993 | Patti Smith | 13–7 | .650 | 4–6 | .400 | 4th | – | – |
| 1994 | Patti Smith | 9–11 | .450 | 4–6 | .400 | 5th | T5th | – |
| 1995 | Patti Smith | 12–9 | .571 | 4–6 | .400 | 4th | T5th | – |
| 1996 | Marcia Pankratz | 7–11 | .389 | 2–8 | .200 | 6th | T5th | – |
| 1997 | Marcia Pankratz | 16–6 | .727 | 7–3 | .700 | T1st | 2nd | – |
| 1998 | Marcia Pankratz | 15–6 | .714 | 7–3 | .700 | 2nd | 2nd | – |
| 1999 | Marcia Pankratz | 20–7 | .741 | 7–3 | .700 | 3rd | 1st | NCAA Runner-Up |
| 2000 | Marcia Pankratz | 19–4 | .826 | 6–0 | 1.000 | 1st | 1st | NCAA Second Round |
| 2001 | Marcia Pankratz | 18–5 | .783 | 4–2 | .667 | 3rd | T3rd | NCAA Champion |
| 2002 | Marcia Pankratz | 18–4 | .818 | 6–0 | 1.000 | 1st | 2nd | NCAA First Round |
| 2003 | Marcia Pankratz | 17–6 | .739 | 5–1 | .833 | T1st | 3rd | NCAA Final Four |
| 2004 | Marcia Pankratz | 17–6 | .739 | 5–1 | .833 | T1st | 1st | NCAA Second Round |
| 2005 | Nancy Cox | 16–8 | .667 | 3–3 | .500 | T3rd | 1st | NCAA Second Round |
| 2006 | Nancy Cox | 11–9 | .550 | 4–2 | .667 | T2nd | T5th | – |
| 2007 | Nancy Cox | 16–7 | .696 | 6–0 | 1.000 | 1st | 2nd | NCAA Second Round |
| 2008 | Nancy Cox | 8–12 | .400 | 3–3 | .500 | 5th | T5th | – |
| 2009 | Marcia Pankratz | 7–14 | .333 | 2–4 | .333 | 5th | 5th | – |
| 2010 | Marcia Pankratz | 15–7 | .682 | 5–1 | .833 | T1st | 1st | NCAA First Round |
| 2011 | Marcia Pankratz | 15–7 | .682 | 5–1 | .833 | 1st | 2nd | NCAA Second Round |
| 2012 | Marcia Pankratz | 15–7 | .682 | 4–2 | .667 | T2nd | 2nd | NCAA First Round |
| 2013 | Marcia Pankratz | 12–8 | .600 | 4–2 | .667 | T3rd | T5th | – |
| 2014 | Marcia Pankratz | 13–7 | .650 | 6–2 | .750 | T2nd | T3rd | – |
| 2015 | Marcia Pankratz | 18–5 | .783 | 7–1 | .875 | T2nd | T2nd | NCAA Quarterfinal |
| 2016 | Marcia Pankratz | 12–8 | .600 | 5–3 | .625 | T3rd | T3rd | NCAA First Round |
| 2017 | Marcia Pankratz | 21–3 | .875 | 8–0 | 1.000 | 1st | 1st | NCAA Final Four |
| 2018 | Marcia Pankratz | 14–7 | .667 | 7–2 | .778 | T1st | 3rd | NCAA Second Round |
| 2019 | Marcia Pankratz | 13–7 | .650 | 5–3 | .625 | T3rd | T4th | NCAA First Round |
| 2020 | Marcia Pankratz | 15–3 | .833 | 6–0 | 1.000 | 1st | 1st | NCAA Runner-Up |
| 2021 | Marcia Pankratz | 16–5 | .762 | 5–3 | .625 | T4th | 2nd | NCAA Second Round |
| 2022 | Marcia Pankratz | 14–6 | .700 | 5–3 | .625 | T3rd | 1st | NCAA First Round |
| 2023 | Marcia Pankratz | 9–8 | .529 | 3–5 | .375 | 7th | T5th | – |
| 2024 | Marcia Pankratz | 15–5 | .750 | 5–3 | .625 | 3rd | 1st | NCAA First Round |

Season-by-season results through the end of the 2024 season

== Coaching staff ==
| Name | Position coached | Consecutive season at Michigan in current position |
|---|---|---|
| Kristi Gannon Fisher | Head coach | 1st |
| Ryan Langford | Assistant coach | 17th |
| Leah Settipane | Assistant coach | 2nd |

== Awards and accolades ==
=== National championships ===
Michigan has accumulated a total of 11 appearances in the NCAA tournament, including three Final Fours. In 2001, the Wolverines won their first NCAA championship by defeating Maryland in the final by a score of 2–0. The victory made them the first women's team at the university to win a national championship, as well as the second field hockey team from the Midwest to earn the title, after Iowa in 1986.

| Year | Coach | Opponent | Score | Record |
| 2001 | Marcia Pankratz | Maryland Terrapins | 2–0 | 18–5 |

=== Conference championships ===
Michigan has won eleven conference titles, all of them in the Big Ten Conference and all but one under the leadership of head coach Marcia Pankratz.

| Year | Coach | Conference Record | Overall Record | Conference | NCAA Result |
| 1997 | Marcia Pankratz | 7–3 | 16–6 | Big Ten | – |
| 2000 | Marcia Pankratz | 6–0 | 19–4 | Big Ten | NCAA Second Round |
| 2002 | Marcia Pankratz | 6–0 | 18–4 | Big Ten | NCAA First Round |
| 2003 | Marcia Pankratz | 5–1 | 17–6 | Big Ten | NCAA Final Four |
| 2004 | Marcia Pankratz | 5–1 | 17–6 | Big Ten | NCAA Second Round |
| 2007 | Nancy Cox | 6–0 | 16–7 | Big Ten | NCAA Second Round |
| 2010 | Marcia Pankratz | 5–1 | 15–7 | Big Ten | NCAA First Round |
| 2011 | Marcia Pankratz | 5–1 | 15–7 | Big Ten | NCAA Second Round |
| 2017 | Marcia Pankratz | 8–0 | 21–3 | Big Ten | NCAA Final Four |
| 2018 | Marcia Pankratz | 7–2 | 14–7 | Big Ten | NCAA Second Round |
| 2020 | Marcia Pankratz | 6–0 | 15–3 | Big Ten | NCAA Runner-Up |
11 Big Ten Championships

=== Conference Tournament Championships ===
| Season | Conference | Head coach |
|---|---|---|
| 1999 | Big Ten Conference | Marcia Pankratz |
| 2000 | Big Ten Conference | Marcia Pankratz |
| 2004 | Big Ten Conference | Marcia Pankratz |
| 2005 | Big Ten Conference | Marcia Pankratz |
| 2010 | Big Ten Conference | Marcia Pankratz |
| 2017 | Big Ten Conference | Marcia Pankratz |
| 2020 | Big Ten Conference | Marcia Pankratz |
| 2022 | Big Ten Conference | Marcia Pankratz |
| 2024 | Big Ten Conference | Marcia Pankratz |
9 Big Ten Tournament Championships

=== All-Americans ===
Key
| First-team selection | Second-team selection | Third-team selection |

| Season | Player | Remarks |
|---|---|---|
| 1996 | Michelle Smulders | |
| 1997 | Julie Flachs | |
| 1997 | Loveita Wilkinson | |
| 1998 | Kelli Gannon | |
| 1998 | Loveita Wilkinson | Second selection |
| 1999 | Kelli Gannon | Second selection |
| 1999 | Ashley Reichenbach | |
| 2000 | Catherine Foreman | |
| 2000 | April Fronzoni | |
| 2000 | Kelli Gannon | Third selection; Second first-team selection |
| 2000 | Courtney Reid | |
| 2001 | Catherine Foreman | Second selection |
| 2002 | April Fronzoni | Second selection |
| 2002 | Kristi Gannon | |
| 2002 | Stephanie Johnson | |
| 2002 | Molly Powers | |
| 2003 | April Fronzoni | Third selection; Second first-team selection |

| Season | Player | Remarks |
|---|---|---|
| 2003 | Kristi Gannon | Second first-team selection |
| 2003 | Stephanie Johnson | |
| 2004 | Lori Hillman | |
| 2004 | Adrienne Hortillosa | |
| 2005 | Lori Hillman | |
| 2006 | Mary Fox | |
| 2007 | Lucia Belassi | |
| 2007 | Paige Laytos | |
| 2010 | Paige Laytos | Second selection |
| 2010 | Rachael Mack | |
| 2010 | Meredith Way | |
| 2011 | Bryn Bain | |
| 2011 | Rachael Mack | Second selection |
| 2012 | Rachael Mack | Third selection |
| 2012 | Ainsley McCallister | |
| 2013 | Rachael Mack | Fourth selection |
| 2014 | Ainsley McCallister | Second selection |
| 2015 | Lauren Thomas | |
| 2015 | Sam Swenson | |
| 2016 | Katie Trombetta | |

| Season | Player | Remarks |
|---|---|---|
| 2017 | Katie Trombetta | Second selection |
| 2017 | Meg Dowthwaite | |
| 2017 | Sam Swenson | Second selection |
| 2018 | Emma Way | |
| 2018 | Guadalupe Fernandez Lacort | |
| 2019 | Guadalupe Fernandez Lacort | Second selection |
| 2020 | Halle O'Neill | |
| 2020 | Anna Spieker | |
| 2020 | Kathryn Peterson | |
| 2021 | Sofia Southam | |
| 2021 | Halle O'Neill | Second selection |
| 2021 | Kathryn Peterson | Second selection |
| 2021 | Anouk Veen | |
| 2022 | Katie Anderson | |
| 2023 | Lora Clarke | |
| 2024 | Abby Tamer | |
| 2024 | Lora Clarke | Second selection |

Awards and accolades through the end of the 2024 season

== Stadium ==
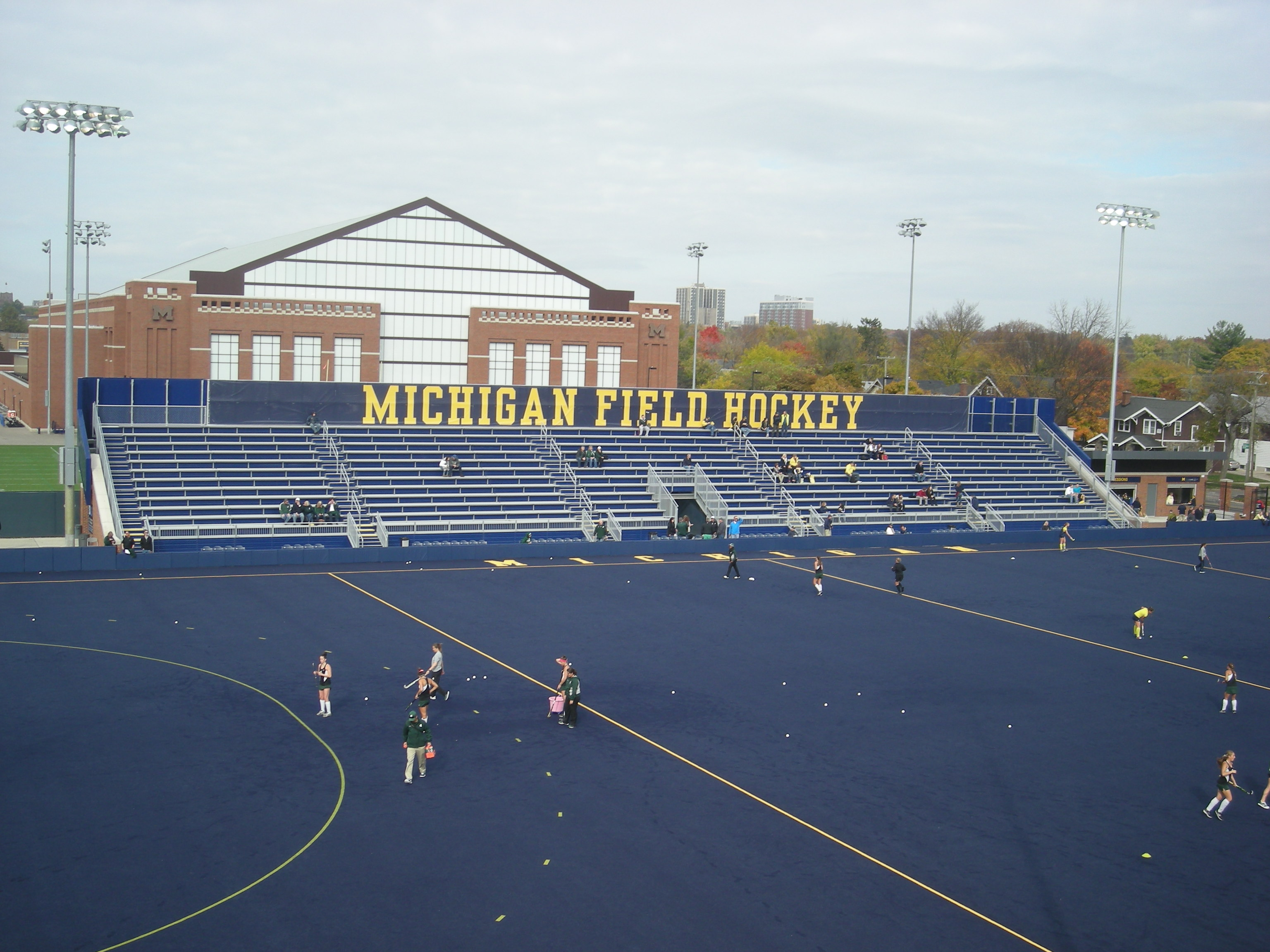
Phyllis Ocker Field before a game in October 2014

Michigan has played its home games at Phyllis Ocker Field Hockey Field since its construction in 1995. The field is named after Phyllis Ocker, a former University of Michigan teacher, field hockey coach, and athletics administrator. In 2003, Ocker Field's AstroTurf playing surface was upgraded at the cost of $500,000. Between the end of the 2013 season and the start of the 2014 season, Ocker Field underwent substantial renovations that included the installation of a blue AstroTurf 12 playing surface and a permanent 1,500-seat grandstand, which tripled the stadium's capacity. In 2017 Ocker Field received a new playing surface with the installation of a Poligras Platinum CoolPlus field. Between the 2003 and 2014 renovations, the stadium had a seating capacity of 500. Before the construction of Ocker Field, the Michigan field hockey team had played at four other venues on campus: Michigan Stadium (1973–75), Ferry Field (1976–86), the Tartan Turf (1987–90), and Oosterbaan Fieldhouse (1991–94).

== See also ==
- List of NCAA Division I field hockey programs
