= Newtown School =

Newtown School may refer to:

- Newtown School, Waterford in Ireland
- Newtown School in New_Zealand: see Newtown, New Zealand#Education
