= Kristi Gannon =

American field hockey player

Kristi Gannon Fisher
Current position
- Title: Head coach
- Team: Michigan
- Conference: Big Ten
- Record: 10–7

Biographical details
- Born: April 13, 1982 (age 44)
- Education: University of Michigan

Playing career
- 2000–2003: Michigan
- Position: Defense / Midfield

Coaching career (HC unless noted)
- 2006–2007: Michigan (volunteer asst.)
- 2009: Michigan (asst.)
- 2019–2024: Michigan (asst.)
- 2025–present: Michigan

Head coaching record
- Overall: 0–0

Accomplishments and honors

Awards
- As Player: NCAA Tournament champion (2001); 3× Big Ten regular season champion First Team (2000, 2002, 2003); Big Ten tournament champion (2000); 2× All-American First Team (2002, 2003); 4× All-Big Ten First Team (2000–2003); NCAA All-Tournament Team (2001); Big Ten Player of the Year (2003); Big Ten Freshman of the Year (2000)
Medal record
Women's field hockey
Representing the United States
Pan American Cup
| Silver medal – second place | 2001 Kingston | Team competition |
| Silver medal – second place | 2004 Bridgetown | Team competition |

Kristi Gannon Fisher (born April 13, 1982) is an American former field hockey defense and midfield player, who is currently the head coach for the Michigan Wolverines. A native of Escondido, California, she attended the University of Michigan, where she played for the Wolverines and was a 2-time All-American. Gannon made her international senior debut for the Women's National Team in 2001. Her sister Kelli was also a member of the US National Team.

== International senior tournaments ==
- 2001 – Pan American Cup, Kingston, Jamaica (2nd)
- 2004 – Olympic Qualifying Tournament, Auckland, New Zealand (6th)
- 2004 – Pan American Cup, Bridgetown, Barbados (2nd)
- 2005 – Champions Challenge, Virginia Beach, United States (5th)
- 2006 – World Cup Qualifier, Rome, Italy (4th)
- 2006 – World Cup, Madrid, Spain (6th)
