= Rodolfo Schmitt =

Argentine field hockey player

Personal information
- Born: April 11, 1974 (age 52)
Medal record
Men's field hockey
Representing Argentina
Pan American Games
Gold medal – first place	1995 Mar del Plata	Team

Rodolfo Schmitt Schefelis (born April 11, 1974) is an Argentine retired field hockey player. He competed for his native country at the 1996 Summer Olympics, where his national squad finished in ninth. He won the gold medal at the 1995 Pan American Games.
