= Kelli Gannon =

American field hockey player

Kelli Gannon (born December 21, 1978, in Escondido, California) is a former field hockey midfield player from the United States, who made her international senior debut for the Women's National Team in 2001 with a goal against Mexico, at the inaugural Pan American Cup. A student of the University of Michigan, where she played for the Wolverines, she earned a total number of 60 caps, in which she scored 12 goals. Her younger sister Kristi later also played for the US National Team.

== International senior tournaments ==
- 2001 – Pan American Cup, Kingston, Jamaica (2nd)
- 2002 – USA vs India WC Qualifying Series, Cannock, England (1st)
- 2002 – World Cup, Perth, Australia (9th)
- 2003 – Champions Challenge, Catania, Italy (5th)
- 2003 – Pan American Games, Santo Domingo, Dominican Republic (2nd)
