= Larry Amar =

American field hockey player (1972–2020)

Medal record

Men's Field Hockey

Representing the United States

Pan American Games
Bronze medal – third place	1995 Mar del Plata	Team competition

Lawrence Amar (February 24, 1972 – January 21, 2020) was a field hockey midfielder from the United States, who was the captain of the national team that finished twelfth at the 1996 Summer Olympics in Atlanta, Georgia. Amar also earned two consecutive USA Field Hockey Athlete of the Year awards in 1994 and 1995.

Following his playing career, Amar served for six years in the United States Army, earning the rank of staff sergeant in the Infantry. He earned two Army Commendation and Army Achievement Medals. He returned home to be the assistant field hockey coach for the Kent State University team from 2009 to 2018. He then went on to assist with U.S. national team.

Born in Camarillo, California, he died at the age of 47 in 2020.
