= Otto Steffers =

American field hockey player

Medal record

Representing United States

Men's field hockey

Pan American Games
Bronze medal – third place	Mar del Plata 1995	Team competition

Otto Steffers (born October 19, 1972, in Louisville, Kentucky) is a former field hockey defender from the United States, who finished twelfth with the national team at the 1996 Summer Olympics in Atlanta, Georgia.
