= Dix Stadium =

American football stadium in Kent, Ohio

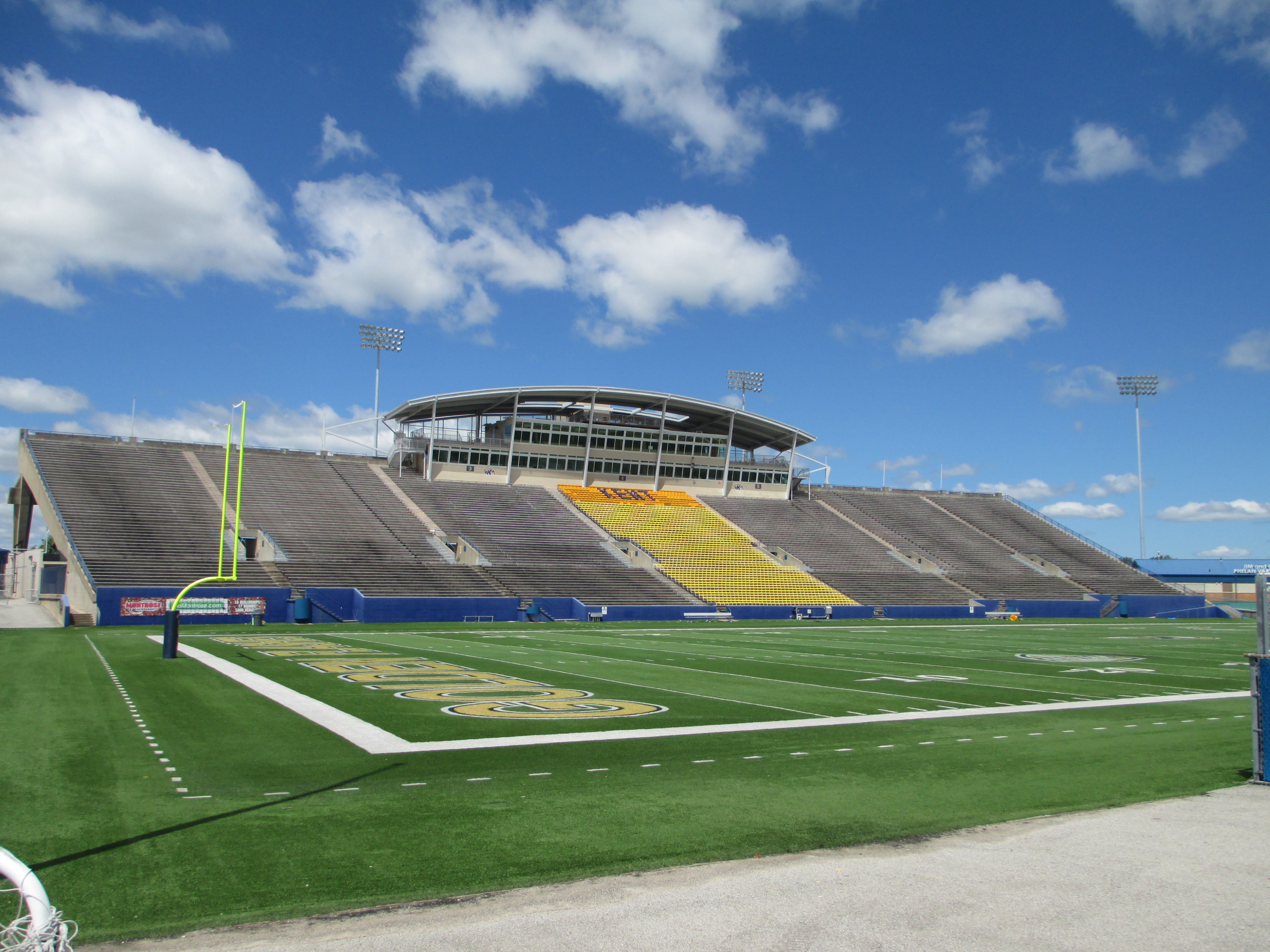
- View of the west grandstand in 2014
- Interactive map of Dix Stadium
- Former names: Memorial Stadium (1969–1973)
- Address: 2227 Summit Road; Kent, Ohio; United States
- Coordinates: 41°8′21″N 81°18′48″W
- Owner: Kent State University
- Operator: Kent State University
- Capacity: 25,319 (2008–present)
- Type: Stadium
- Surface: FieldTurf (2005–present); AstroTurf (1997–2004); Natural grass (1969–1996)
- Scoreboard: 72 ft (22 m) wide, 30 ft (9.1 m) tall
- Record attendance: 27,363 (October 13, 1973 vs. Miami (OH))
- Current use: Football; Soccer; Lacrosse

Construction
- Groundbreaking: 1968
- Opened: September 13, 1969; 56 years ago
- Renovated: 2008
- Cost: $3.5 million ($30.7 million in 2025 dollars)
- Architect: Osborn-Papesh
- General contractor: Melborne Brothers

Tenants
- Kent State Golden Flashes (NCAA) teams: football (1969–present); women's soccer (2016–present); women's lacrosse (2019–present); field hockey (1997–2004)

Website
- kentstatesports.com/dix-stadium

Dix Stadium is a stadium in Kent, Ohio, United States, on the campus of Kent State University. It is the home field of the Kent State Golden Flashes football, women's soccer, and women's lacrosse teams. Previously, it was used by the field hockey team (1997–2004) and served as a secondary venue for men's soccer in the 1970s. The stadium opened in 1969 as an "expansion and relocation" of the original Memorial Stadium and was named in 1973 for Robert C. Dix, a longtime university trustee and former publisher of the Record-Courier. The playing surface is known as Zoeller Field during women's soccer games.

Dix Stadium features three grandstands with a total capacity of 25,319. The west grandstand houses the press box and offers the most seating, while the east side is smaller and includes areas for party tents. The south end zone contains the scoreboard and an open plaza. Notable upgrades include the addition of permanent lights in 1996 and the installation of artificial turf in 1997 (replaced in 2005). Several renovations have reshaped the stadium, including the removal and replacement of the east stands in 2002–03 and the demolition of the south bleachers in 2008, which reduced the original capacity from 30,520 to its current size.

The stadium is part of a larger athletic complex that includes the Kent State Field House, Murphy–Mellis Field, and Devine Diamond. In addition to university events, it regularly hosts high school football and has been the site of major collegiate tournaments, including the 2001 NCAA Division I Field Hockey Championship and several Mid-American Conference events.

== History ==
Prior to the opening of Dix Stadium, the Golden Flashes football team played home games at Memorial Stadium, which was located adjacent to what is now known as the Memorial Athletic and Convocation Center. Memorial Stadium opened in 1950, though the team had been playing on the site since 1941. By 1965, Memorial Stadium had been expanded to seat 20,000 people from its original 5,600. Enrollment growth and construction of new academic buildings in the 1950s and early 1960s meant that the Memorial Stadium site, which had previously been the edge of campus, was instead becoming its physical center. In 1964, continued and forecasted enrollment growth at Kent State led to discussion on building a new University Center in the area partially occupied by the stadium, to include a new student center and library along with additional parking and new classroom buildings for science. Early plans for the stadium called for it to seat 55,000 and be located in the southwest corner of the campus, adjacent to the site of what is now Schoonover Stadium. By 1966, the university had purchased land near the corner of Horning Road and Summit Road in Franklin Township. Preliminary plans call for an athletic complex centered on a new stadium seating between 40,000 and 55,000 people to be opened in 1969, with parking for 9,000 cars. Later plans called for the complex to include a 15,000-seat arena and a field house with an indoor track.

Dix Stadium, known as Memorial Stadium until 1973, was regarded as an "expansion and relocation" of Memorial Stadium rather than an entirely new stadium. A new grandstand on the west side of the stadium, with seating for over 12,000 people and locker room and press facilities, was constructed on the new site, along Summit Road just over 1 mile (1.6 km) east of campus. Approximately 17,000 seats from Memorial Stadium were dismantled and moved to the new site. Memorial Stadium's sideline grandstands became the end zone seats in the new stadium, while the auxiliary bleacher sections were used for the east stands.

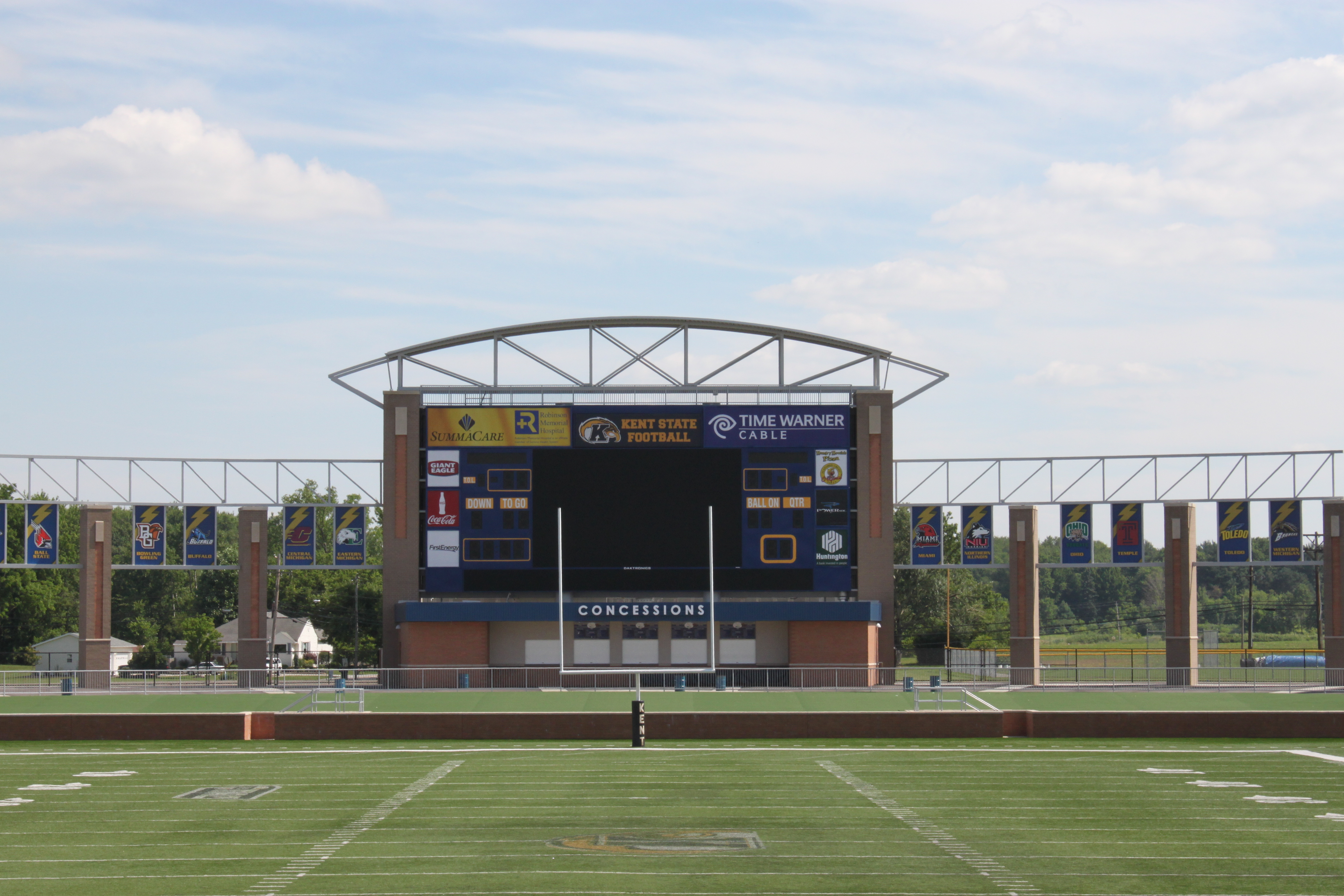
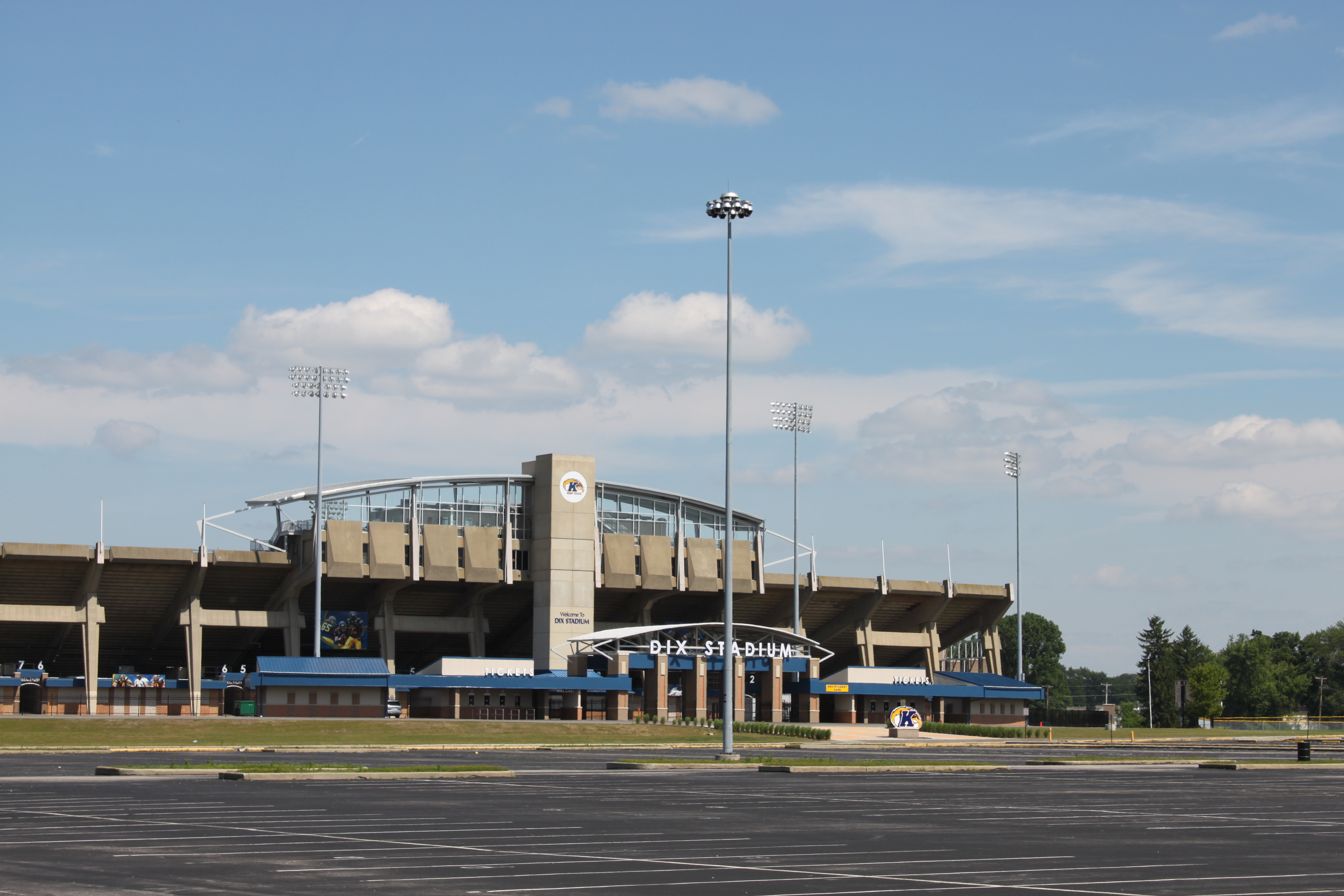
A new HD scoreboard and entryways were part of the 2008 renovations

The first game at Dix Stadium was on September 13, 1969, a 24–14 win over the Dayton Flyers in front of 8,172 fans. Because of delays, the new west stands, including the home and visitor locker rooms, press box, and most of the seating, were not completed until after the 1969 football season, limiting the seating capacity to 18,200. For the first season, the teams dressed in the locker rooms at the Memorial Athletic and Convocation Center and were bused to the stadium. At halftime, the teams met in separate public restroom facilities. The "new" Memorial Stadium was dedicated in 1970 and renamed Dix Stadium in honor of longtime Kent State trustee and Record-Courier publisher Robert C. Dix in 1973. Its initial seating capacity was listed at 28,748 before later being revised to 30,520, which stood through the 2001 season.

The first major changes to Dix Stadium began in 1992 when an elevator was added to reach the press box and suites, and in 1996 when permanent lighting was added. Night games had been played since 1990, but with temporary lighting. A new scoreboard and artificial turf were installed in 1997, which allowed the field hockey team to begin play at the stadium. The field hockey team played home games at Dix Stadium through the 2004 season before moving to the adjacent Murphy-Mellis Field in 2005. After the east side bleachers were condemned and demolished in 2001, the area remained open for the entire 2002 season. Prior to the start of the 2003 season, a new section of bleacher seating was built as the student section, bringing the total seating capacity to 29,287.

In 2007, a two-phase renovation of the stadium started. Phase one included construction of a large canopy over the press box, new entrance gates, and a ticket office, all completed prior to the 2007 season opener. Phase two included the demolition of the south end zone seats and the former press box atop the seats in the north end zone, and construction of a new HD scoreboard, concession area, and plaza in the sound end zone area. The removal of the approximately 5,000 seats in the south end zone reduced the stadium's seating capacity to 25,319.

=== Layout ===
Dix Stadium is laid out with the football field running north–south, with separate seating areas on the west, north, and east sides. The west stands, often referred to as the "home stands", are the largest and include the locker rooms and player facilities beneath them, the press box and suites, and both bleacher and chair back seating for over 12,000 fans. The east stands, built in 2003 to replace the original wooden bleachers, are the smallest section and are the primary student section, with bleacher seating for over 4,000 fans. The north end zone, which is the original grandstand of old Memorial Stadium, is also entirely made up of bleacher seats. A large plaza, concession area, and the scoreboard are located in the south end zone.

When it first opened, the stadium had four major seating areas, with the new west stands and the seating moved from old Memorial Stadium on the other three sides of the field. Initial long-range plans for the stadium called for it to eventually be expanded to seat 50,000 people. The original east stands, which were wooden bleachers considered temporary, were to be removed by 1973 and replaced with permanent seating. This section was to have been 18 rows initially, and would have eventually been expanded to duplicate the west stands, increasing capacity to approximately 35,000. The final phase would have been to add a second deck on both sides. Changes to the seating capacity, however, would not come for 31 years when the east side bleachers were condemned and demolished following the 2001 season.

The first official game listed as a sell-out occurred on October 9, 2010 when 24,221 fans were on hand for the Flashes' 28–17 win over arch-rival Akron in the Battle for the Wagon Wheel. The crowd ranks as the third-largest crowd to see a game at Dix Stadium, surpassed by two games in 1973: 25,137 against Bowling Green on October 13, and 27,363 against Miami on November 10.

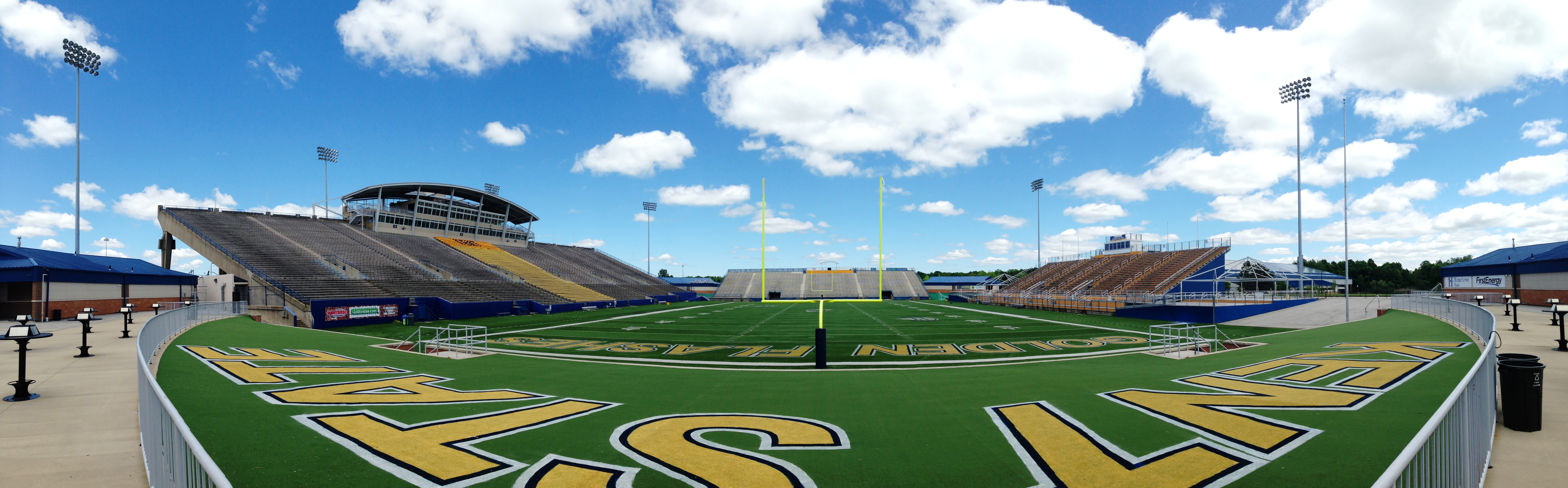

1000px

== Location ==
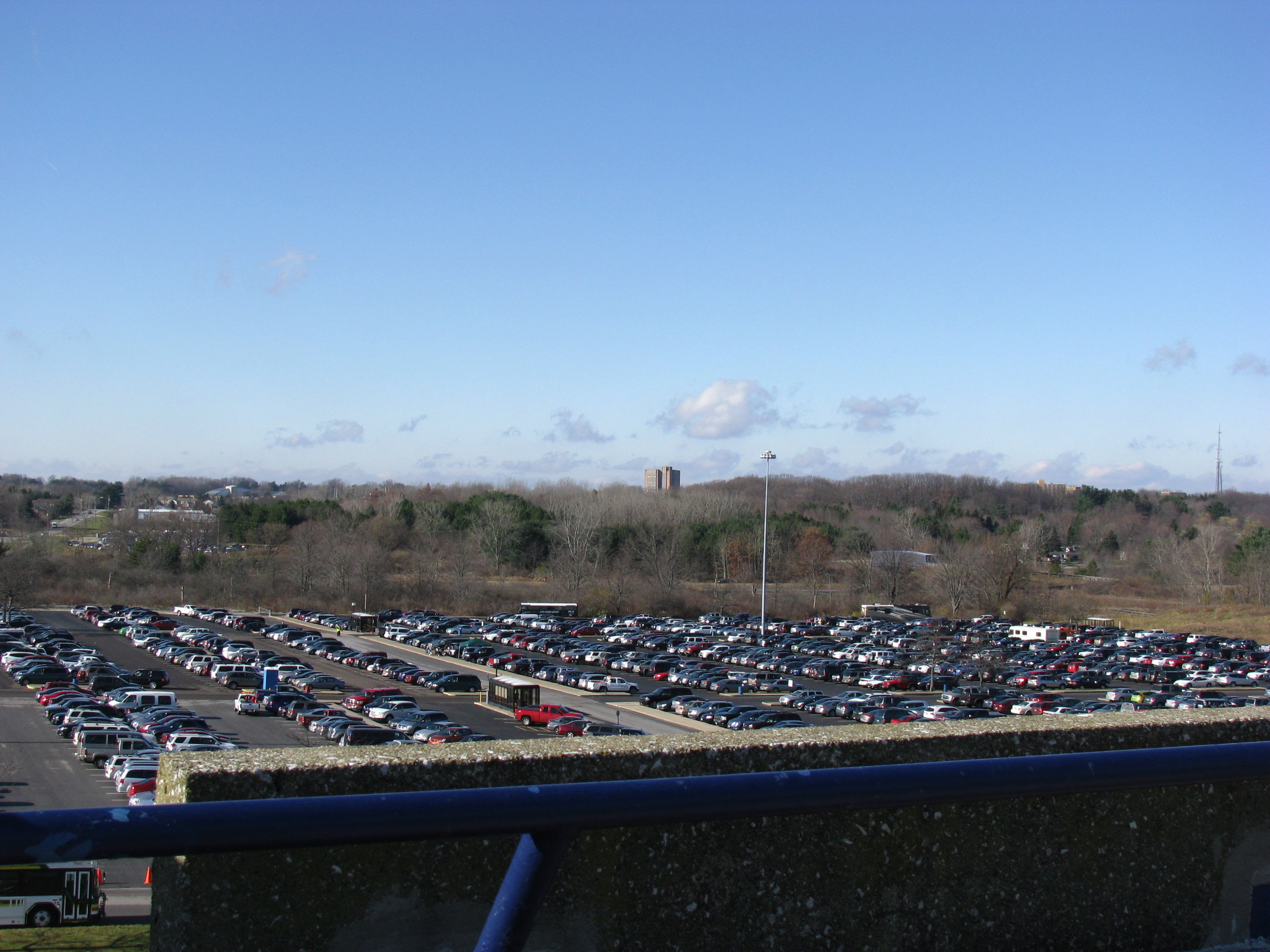
View from the top of Dix Stadium looking west towards the center of campus. The 12-story main library is visible in center, approximately 1.6 miles (2.5 km) away

Dix Stadium is located along Summit Street in Kent, just east of the intersection of Summit Street and Ohio State Route 261, on the eastern edge of the Kent State University main campus. The stadium was annexed into the city of Kent in 2002 after having previously been part of Franklin Township. Adjacent to the stadium are facilities and practice fields for several other Kent State athletic teams. When the stadium was built, a cinder track was included on the site, northeast of the stadium. While the track is no longer used for competitions, it surrounds a natural grass playing surface that was previously known as Zoeller Field, the former home of the Kent State women's soccer team. The field was constructed in 1990 as the home of the field hockey team, becoming the home of the women's soccer team in 1997. It was upgraded in 2010, but the team moved all home games to Dix Stadium in 2016 and during soccer games, the playing surface is known as Zoeller Field.

Immediately east of Dix Stadium and south of the former Zoeller Field is the Kent State Field House, built in 1990 and expanded in 2014. It includes a full-sized football field, track, weight training facilities, and locker rooms. It is primarily used by the football team for training and practice and the indoor track and field teams for practice and meets. Other KSU sports such as baseball and softball use the field house for practice during winter months. South of Dix Stadium is Devine Diamond, previously known as the Diamond at Dix, the home of the Kent State softball team, with Murphy-Mellis Field, the home of the KSU field hockey team, adjacent on the north along with two natural grass practice fields for football. Devine Diamond opened in 1999 and Murphy-Mellis Field opened in 2005.

=== Future plans ===
The university began the $60 million "Building Champions" campaign in 2013 to upgrade facilities for all of Kent State's athletic teams as well as raise additional scholarship money. The first project was expansion of the Field House with new locker rooms for indoor track and field, women's soccer, field hockey, and softball, as well as concession areas and restrooms for fans, a project completed in 2014. There were also other plans to both Dix Stadium and the surrounding athletic complex. Among the changes planned were a new Zoeller Field south of the Field House and east of Dix Stadium with seating for 2,150 and a new all-weather track surrounding a soccer field. Additionally, a new parking lot was planned north of the Field House where the former Zoeller Field stands. In front of Dix Stadium, Devine Diamond would be removed and a new parking area for alumni would be built in its place, with a new softball stadium being built adjacent to Schoonover Stadium.

Improvements planned for Dix Stadium included expanded chairback seating and suite upgrades on the west stands, a new building for the coaches' offices on the north of the stadium, and improvements to the locker room and other player facilities, including a new players' lounge. On the east side, two covered seating areas for students were to be built adjacent to the existing student seating. As of 2025, however, only the addition to the Field House was ever completed, and in 2023, the university made several upgrades to Devine Diamond.

== Other uses ==
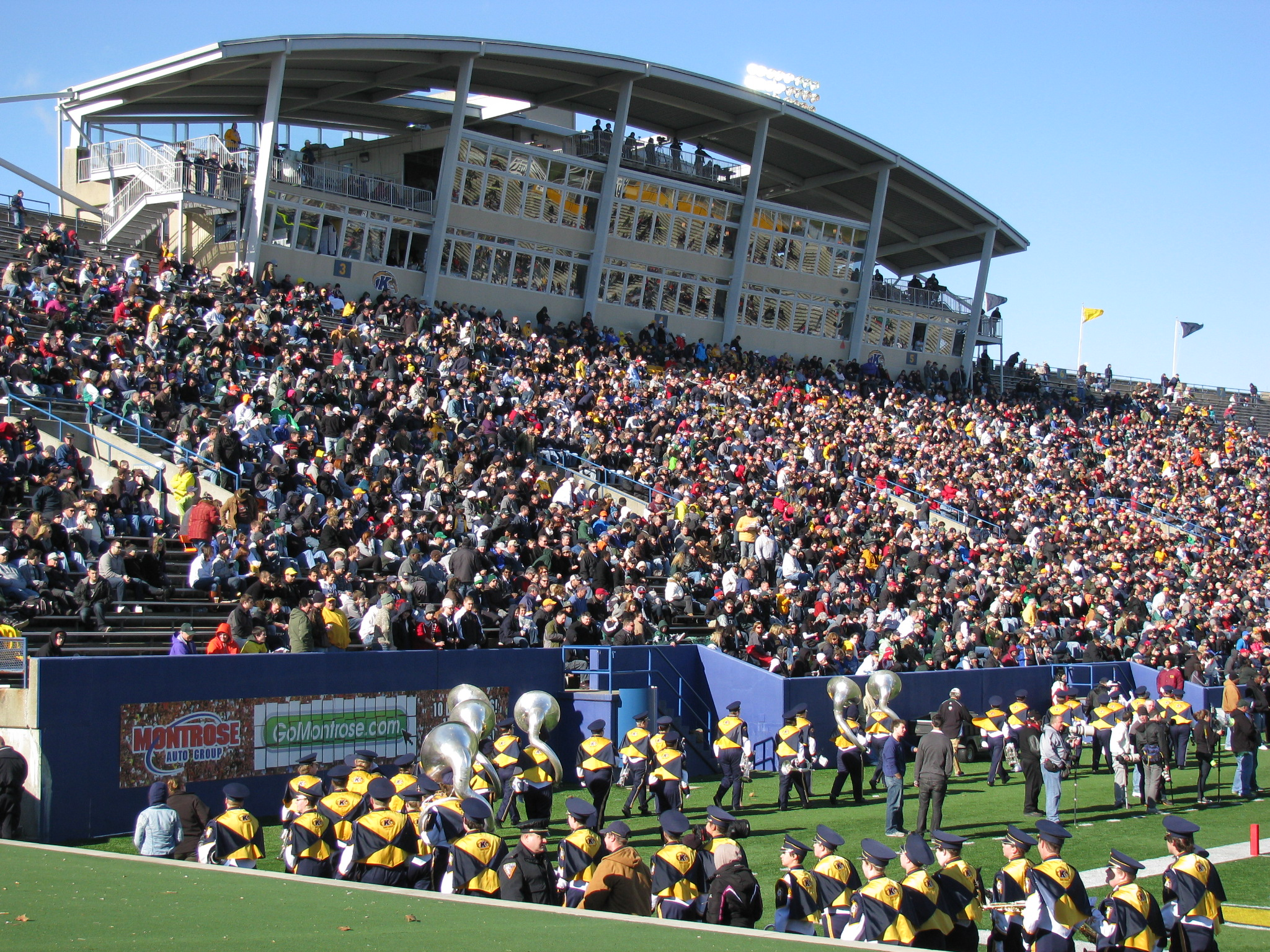
During a game in November 2012 against the Ohio Bobcats

In addition to being the home venue for the Kent State football team since 1969 and for the Kent State field hockey team from 1997 through the 2004 season, Dix Stadium has also been used for a number of other events. It is a regular host for high school football games, usually Ohio High School Athletic Association playoff games. From 1997–1999, the stadium was the site of the annual rivalry game between Theodore Roosevelt High School and Ravenna High School. In 1998, the OHSAA Division I state semifinal between Canton McKinley High School and Cleveland Saint Ignatius High School was played at the stadium in front of a near sellout crowd. The stadium hosted two state playoff games in 2012, an opening round game between Theodore Roosevelt High School and Ellet High School in Division II and a Division I second-round game between Canton McKinley High School and Massillon Washington High School that drew an estimated 20,000 fans.

From 1975 to 1981, the Cleveland Browns held their training camp on the campus of Kent State University and used the stadium and practice fields. In 1980, a controlled scrimmage with the Buffalo Bills held in the stadium drew 26,758 fans. During the field hockey team's tenure at Dix Stadium, it was the site of the Mid-American Conference Field Hockey Tournament in 1998 and 2003, and of the semifinal and championship rounds of the 2001 NCAA Division I Field Hockey Championship, held November 16 through 18. It was the first time Kent State had hosted a national championship event since the 1967 NCAA Division I Wrestling Championships were held at the Memorial Athletic and Convocation Center, and the first national championship hosted by a MAC school since 1992. The 2016 Mid-American Women's Soccer Tournament was held at Dix Stadium, with the semifinals played November 4 and the championship match played November 6, won by the Flashes. It marked the first time Kent State hosted the MAC tournament and was the first time Kent State won the tournament. In preparation for hosting the MAC Tournament, the KSU women's soccer team played most of their home games in the 2016 season at the stadium. The previous season, the team hosted its opening round match in the MAC tournament at Dix Stadium. In the 1970s, Dix Stadium was used by the KSU men's soccer team for occasional matches until the team disbanded in 1980.

From 1970 through 1973, the university's May commencement ceremony was held there, but was moved back to the Memorial Athletic and Convocation Center in 1974, where it has remained since. The stadium again hosted commencement in July 1991 because of renovations at the MAC Center. Shortly after the inauguration of university president Lester Lefton in 2006, he announced plans to have one large commencement ceremony at Dix Stadium to begin in 2008, but the plans were later canceled. The stadium was used again for commencement from 2017 through 2019 for Kent State's "One University Commencement Ceremony", which included students from all eight KSU campuses. The 2017 program was highlighted by keynote speaker Octavia Spencer, while the keynote speaker in 2018 was Kent State alum Michael Keaton, who ended his speech with "I'm Batman". The facility has also been used as a concert venue, most recently in 2012 as part of the university's Centennial Campaign when Sheryl Crow and Los Lonely Boys played there. It was the first concert held at the stadium in 25 years.

=== In film ===
During the filming for the movie Draft Day, the stadium was used as a stand-in for Ohio Stadium in a scene that depicts a football game between the Ohio State Buckeyes and the Wisconsin Badgers. Dix Stadium was chosen because of its proximity to Cleveland, where most of the filming for the movie was taking place. Filming took place May 18, 2013 primarily in the north end zone and included a number of local extras as fans, the addition of the Ohio State "Block O" on the center of the football field, and the placing of Ohio State padding on the south end goal post.

== See also ==
- List of NCAA Division I FBS football stadiums
