= Marcia Pankratz =

American field hockey player (born 1964)

Biographical details
- Born: October 1, 1964 (age 62); Wakefield, Massachusetts, U.S.
- Education: University of Iowa

Playing career
- 1982–1985: Iowa
- Position: Forward

Coaching career (HC unless noted)
- 1996–2004: Michigan
- 2009–2024: Michigan

Head coaching record
- Overall: 371–162

Accomplishments and honors

Championships
- NCAA Tournament Championship (2001); 10× Big Ten Regular Season Champions (1997, 2000, 2002, 2003, 2004, 2010, 2011, 2017, 2018, 2020); 9× Big Ten Tournament Champions (1999, 2000, 2004, 2005, 2010, 2017, 2020, 2022, 2024)

Awards
- As Coach: 5× NFHCA West Region Coach of the Year (1999, 2000, 2003, 2015, 2017); 6× Big Ten Coach of the Year (1997, 2000, 2002, 2010, 2011, 2017); As Player: All-American First Team (1984, 1985); All-Big Ten First Team (1984, 1985); NCAA All-Tournament Team (1984); Big Ten's Most Valuable Player (1984); Big Ten Offensive Player of the Year (1984); Field Hockey Big Ten Athlete of the Decade (1982–92)
Medal record
Women's field hockey
Representing the United States
Champions Trophy
Bronze medal – third place	1995 Mar del Plata	Team Competition
Pan American Games
Silver medal – second place	1995 Mar del Plata	Team competition
Bronze medal – third place	1991 Havana	Team competition

Marcia Anne Pankratz (born October 1, 1964) is an American former field hockey forward and head coach for the Michigan Wolverines. Pankratz participated in two Summer Olympics. In 1988 she finished in eighth position with Team USA, in 1996 she claimed the fifth spot. Pankratz had 110 international appearances over the course of her career.

== Career ==
=== Playing career ===
Pankratz attended Wakefield High School and the University of Iowa, where she played for the Hawkeyes. She finished her career with 76 goals to rank third among all-time Iowa goal scorers. She was chosen for the NCAA All-Tournament team in 1984 and was part of the first team of the Big Ten All-Decade Team (1981–91). She was named University of Iowa Female Athlete of the Year and was twice (1984 and 1985) selected All-American. She won the Big Ten Medal of Honor for 1985–86.

Pankratz was vice-captain of Team USA from 1985–1996. She played with the team that won a bronze medal at the Hockey World Cup in 1986 and 1994, a bronze medal at the 1991 Pan American Games, a silver at the Pan Am Games in 1995, and a bronze at the 1995 Hockey Champions Trophy tournament. She scored three goals at the 1996 Olympic Games.

=== Coaching career ===
She was assistant coach at the University of North Carolina at Chapel Hill, and was head coach at the University of Michigan when the Wolverines won the 2001 NCAA Championship, the first NCAA championship by a women's team in the history of Michigan athletics. Pankratz has guided Michigan to seven Big Ten Tournament Championships and ten Big Ten regular-season titles during her tenure.

In 2017, Michigan swept the Big Ten regular-season and tournament championships and recorded a program-record 21 wins, including 18 in a row, en route to the NCAA Final Four. In 2020, Michigan swept the Big Ten regular-season and tournament championships, and advanced to the 2020 NCAA Championship where they lost in the championship game to North Carolina in overtime. She is the winningest coach in Michigan field hockey history, with a record of 333–142.
