= Diego Chiodo =

Argentine field hockey player

Personal information
- Born: January 28, 1970 (age 56)
Medal record
Men's field hockey
Representing Argentina
Pan American Games
Gold medal – first place	1995 Mar del Plata	Team
Silver medal – second place	1999 Winnipeg	Team

Diego Chiodo (born January 28, 1970) is a former field hockey player from Argentina. He competed for his native country at the 1996 Summer Olympics, where he finished in ninth place with the national squad.
