= Tara Croxford =

Canadian field hockey player (born 1968)

Personal information
- Full name: Tara Joy Berrett
- Born: Tara Joy Croxford; January 7, 1968 (age 58) Winnipeg, Manitoba, Canada

Sport
- Sport: Field hockey
Medal record
Women's field hockey
Representing Canada
Pan American Games
| Silver medal – second place | 1991 Havana | Team competition |
| Bronze medal – third place | 1995 Mar del Plata | Team competition |

Tara Joy Berrett (née Croxford, born January 7, 1968, in Winnipeg, Manitoba) is a former field hockey player from Canada. She represented her native country at the 1992 Summer Olympics in Barcelona, Spain, where she ended up in seventh place with the Canadian National Team. She is married to veteran race walker and former Olympian Tim Berrett.
