= Jeamie Deacon =

Irish rugby union footballer and coach, and field hockey player

- Born: 25 June 1987 (age 39) County Wexford
- Height: 1.78 m (5 ft 10 in)
- Weight: 77 kg (170 lb)
- School: Newtown School, Waterford
- University: Michigan State University; University College Dublin
- Occupation: Teacher

Rugby union career
- Position: Winger/Centre
Youth career
- 199x–199x: Enniscorthy
Senior career
Years	Team	Apps	(Points)
2013–	Blackrock College		
Provincial / State sides
Years	Team	Apps	(Points)
2014–	Leinster		
International career
Years	Team	Apps	(Points)
2015–	Ireland		
National sevens team
Years	Team		Comps
201x–	Ireland		

Jeamie Deacon (born 1987), also referred to as Jamie Deacon, is an Ireland women's rugby union international and an Ireland women's rugby sevens international. Deacon represented Ireland at the 2017 Women's Rugby World Cup. Deacon is also a former Ireland women's field hockey international. Between 2007 and 2009 she was named three times as an NFHCA All-American while playing field hockey for Michigan State Spartans. She also won Irish Senior Cup and Women's Irish Hockey League titles with UCD.

== Early years, family and education ==
Deacon is the daughter of Niall and Anne Deacon. Her father played rugby union for Enniscorthy. She was raised in the Killanne/Ballinlug district of County Wexford, near Enniscorthy. She was educated at Newtown School, Waterford, Michigan State University and at University College Dublin.

== Field hockey ==
Jeamie Deacon
Sport
- Sport: Field hockey
- Position: Midfielder
Youth career
- Years: Team
- 2000–2006: Newtown School, Waterford
Senior career
Years	Team	Caps	Goals
2003–2004	Waterford	-	-
2005–2007	Old Alex	-	-
2007–2009	Michigan State Spartans	-	-
2010–2011	Railway Union	-	-
2011–2015	UCD Ladies	-	-
National team
Years	Team	Caps	Goals
2006	Ireland		-

=== Old Alex ===
In 2005–06 while playing for Old Alex, Deacon was named the club's Young Player of the Season. In 2006–07 she was named club Player of the Season. She was also the club's leading goalscorer for the season. In 2006 Deacon also played for Old Alexandra in the Irish Senior Cup final, losing 1–0 against Hermes.

=== Michigan State Spartans ===
Between 2007 and 2009 Deacon attended Michigan State University on a hockey scholarship. She majored in Civil Engineering and played for Michigan State Spartans in the 2007, 2008 and 2009 NCAA Division I Field Hockey Championships. Deacon was named as an NFHCA All-American in all three years she played for Michigan State Spartans.

=== Railway Union ===
Deacon played for Railway Union during the 2010–11 season.

=== UCD ===
Deacon began playing for UCD in 2011. She subsequently played for UCD in three successive Irish Senior Cup finals. In 2012, along with Chloe Watkins, Dora Gorman, Anna O'Flanagan and Deirdre Duke, she was a member of the UCD team that defeated Loreto 3–2. UCD where finalists again in 2013 but this time Deacon finished on the losing side as they lost 3–2 to Railway Union. In 2014 Deacon played in a third Irish Senior Cup final with UCD as they defeated Pembroke Wanderers 2–0 in the final. Her teammates on this occasion included Anna O'Flanagan, Deirdre Duke, Nicola Evans, Katie Mullan, Emily Beatty and Gillian Pinder. The 2013–14 season saw UCD and Deacon complete a national double after they also won their first Women's Irish Hockey League title. Deacon also played for UCD in the 2015 EuroHockey Club Champions Cup. While attending University College Dublin, Deacon also qualified as a teacher.

=== Ireland international ===
Deacon represented Ireland at Under-18 and Under-21 levels. She was also included in the senior squad for the 2006 Celtic Cup.

== Rugby union ==
=== Clubs ===
Deacon first played rugby union at Under-10 and Under-12 level with Enniscorthy. However, after starting at Newtown School, Waterford she switched to field hockey. In 2013 she began training and playing for Blackrock College.

=== Leinster ===
Deacon has also represented Leinster in the IRFU Women's Interprovincial Series

=== Ireland international ===
Deacon was included in the 2015 Women's Six Nations Championship squad but did not get to play. On 14 November 2015 she made her international debut in an 8–3 defeat against England in an Autumn International at Twickenham Stoop. Deacon represented Ireland at the 2017 Women's Rugby World Cup.

Deacon is also an Ireland women's rugby sevens international.

== Teacher ==
Deacon is a Maths teacher at The High School, Dublin. She has also coached the High School's rugby union and field hockey teams.

== Honours ==
=== Field hockey ===
UCD

- Women's Irish Hockey League
  - Winners: 2013–14
- Irish Senior Cup
  - Winners: 2011–12, 2013–14
  - Runners Up: 2012–13

Old Alexandra

- Irish Senior Cup
  - Runners Up: 2005–06

Individual

- NFHCA All-American
  - Winner: 2007, 2008, 2009
