= Steve Wagner (field hockey) =

American field hockey player

Medal record

Representing United States

Men's field hockey

Pan American Games
Bronze medal – third place	Mar del Plata 1995	Team Competition

Steven Wagner (born November 5, 1967, in Philadelphia) is a former field hockey goalkeeper from the United States, who finished 12th with the men's national team at the 1996 Summer Olympics in Atlanta, Georgia.
