= Deb Whitten =

Canadian field hockey player

Personal information
- Full name: Deborah Ruth Whitten
- Born: December 5, 1966 (age 59) Victoria, British Columbia, Canada

Sport
- Sport: Field hockey
Medal record
Women's field hockey
Representing Canada
Pan American Games
Silver medal – second place	1991 Havana	Team competition
Bronze medal – third place	1995 Mar del Plata	Team competition

Deborah Ruth Whitten (born December 5, 1966, in Victoria, British Columbia) is a former field hockey goalkeeper from Canada who represented her native country at the 1992 Summer Olympics in Barcelona, Spain. There she ended up in seventh place with the Canadian National Women's Team.
