= Ben Maruquin =

American field hockey player

Medal record

Representing United States

Men's field hockey

Pan American Games
Bronze medal – third place	Mar del Plata 1995	Team competition

Benjamin Maruquin (born February 26, 1970, in Ventura, California) is a former field hockey sweeper from the United States, who finished twelfth with the national team at the 1996 Summer Olympics in Atlanta, Georgia.

He was taught field hockey by his father Marvin Maruquin and his uncle Beau Stockdill (both of whom competed at the Pan American Games in the 1970s).

He was named as the USA Field Hockey male Athlete of the Year in 1991 and 1993. He competed in over 200 international matches for the USA Men's National Team from 1989 to 1997.

He moved into coaching after his competitive retirement. He became the head coach at the Ventura County High Performance Training Center in 2006 and was chosen as the USA Men's U-21 Head Coach in 2010.
