= Marq Mellor =

American field hockey player

Medal record

Representing United States

Men's field hockey

Pan American Games
| Bronze medal – third place | Mar del Plata 1995 | Team competition |

Marq Mellor (born March 5, 1968, in Long Island, New York) is a former field hockey forward from the United States, who finished twelfth with the national team at the 1996 Summer Olympics in Atlanta, Georgia.
