= Marisa López =

Argentine field hockey player

Personal information
- Born: September 10, 1964 (age 61)
Medal record
Women's field hockey
Representing Argentina
World Cup
Silver medal – second place	1994 Dublin	Team
Pan American Games
Gold medal – first place	1987 Indianapolis	Team
Gold medal – first place	1991 Havana	Team
Gold medal – first place	1995 Mar del Plata	Team

Marisa A. López (born September 10, 1964) is a retired female field hockey player from Argentina. She was a member of the Women's National Team that finished in seventh place at the 1988 Summer Olympics in Seoul, South Korea after having won the gold medal the previous year at the Pan American Games in Indianapolis.
