= Midwestern Collegiate Hockey Conference =

- Conference: ACHA
- Sports fielded: Men's ice hockey
- Division: Division III

Midwestern Collegiate Hockey Conference (MWCHC) is an American Collegiate Hockey Association Division III club level hockey-only college athletic conference with teams in the American Midwest.

== Members ==
- Butler University
- Denison University
- Eastern Kentucky
- Holy Cross College
- Indiana University-Purdue University Fort Wayne
- University of Akron
- University of Louisville
- Xavier University

== See also ==
- American Collegiate Hockey Association
- List of ice hockey leagues
