= John O'Neill (field hockey) =

American field hockey player

John Fitzgerald O'Neill (born November 23, 1968) is an American former field hockey player who competed in the 1996 Summer Olympics.
