= Silvia Corvalán =

Argentine field hockey player

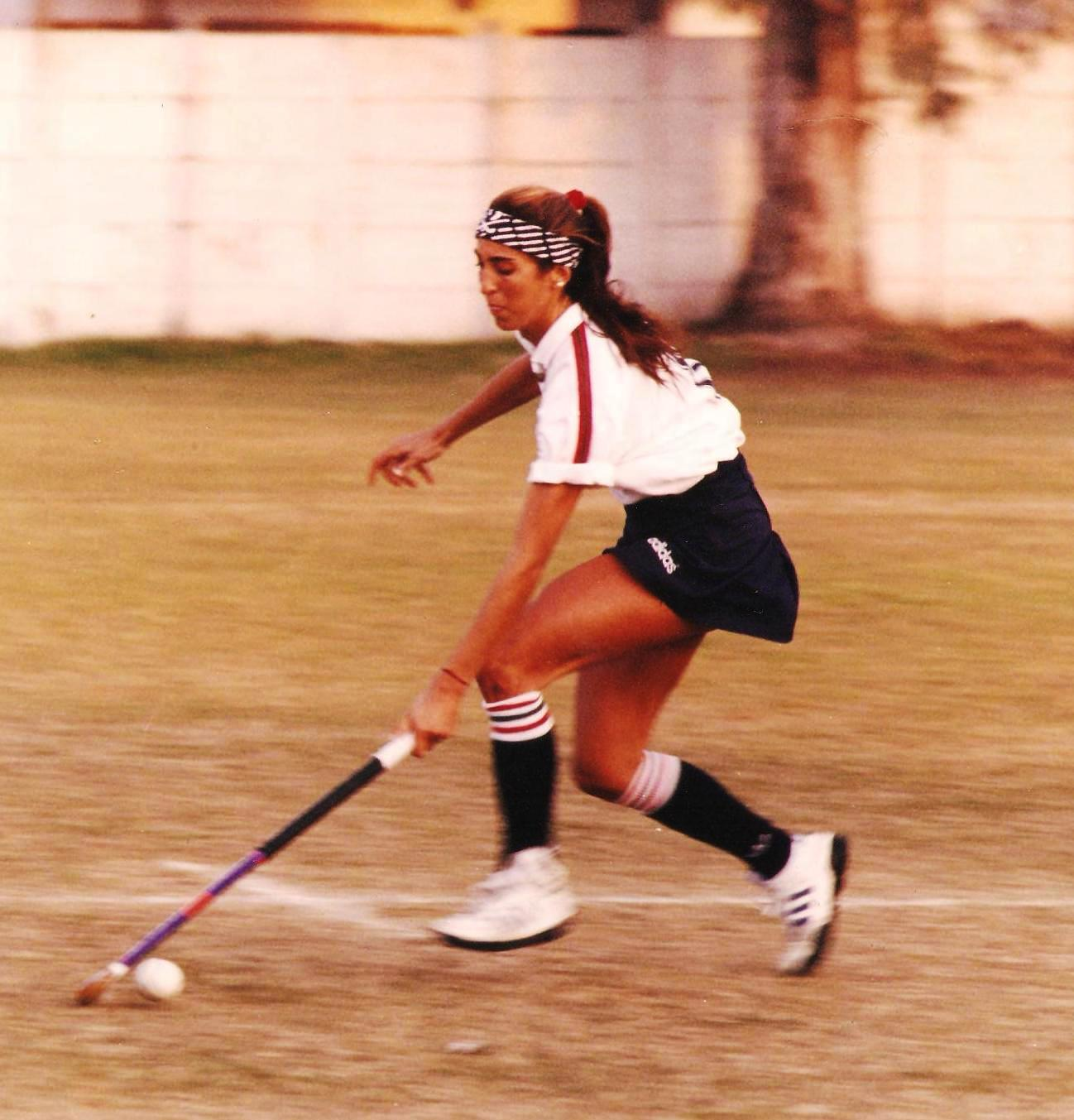
- Corvalan in 2005

Personal information
- Born: 1974 (age 51–52)
Medal record
Women's field hockey
Representing Argentina
Pan American Games
Gold medal – first place	1995 Mar del Plata	Team
Gold medal – first place	1999 Winnipeg	Team

Silvina ("Silvia") Corvalán Mayoral (born October 15, 1973) is a retired female field hockey defender from Argentina. She was a member of the Women's National Team that competed at the 1996 Summer Olympics, after having won the gold medal the previous year at the 1995 Pan American Games.
