= Gabriela Sánchez (field hockey) =

Argentine field hockey player

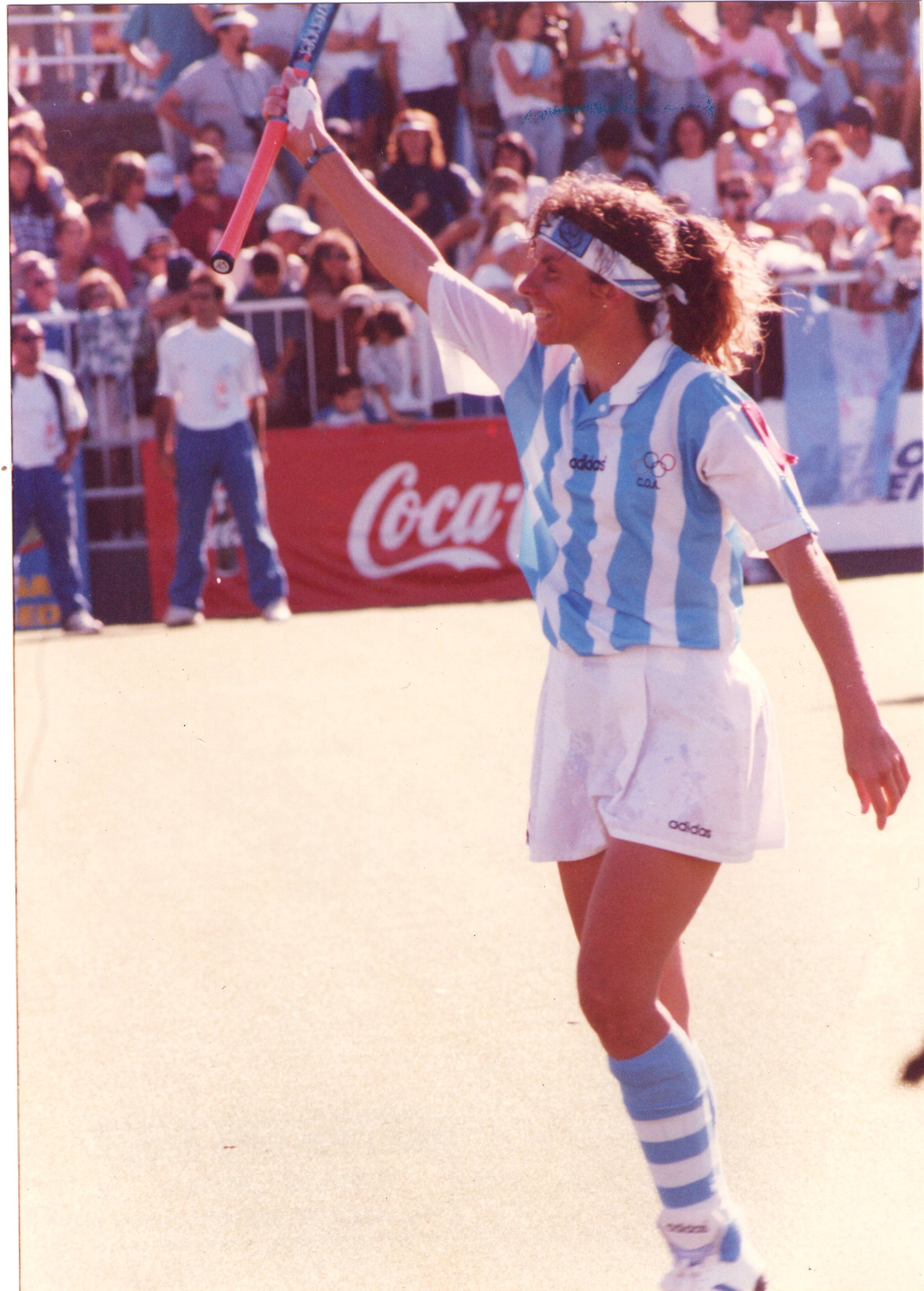

Personal information
- Born: October 27, 1962 (age 63)
Medal record
Women's field hockey
Representing Argentina
World Cup
Silver medal – second place	1994 Dublin	Team
Pan American Games
Gold medal – first place	1987 Indianapolis	Team
Gold medal – first place	1995 Mar del Plata	Team

Gabriela Edith Sánchez Grossi (born October 27, 1962) is a retired Argentinian field hockey player. She was part of the Argentina national team that competed at the Summer Olympics in 1988 and 1996. Sánchez won gold medals at the 1987 and 1995 Pan American Games.
