= Michigan State Spartans field hockey =

- University: Michigan State University
- Conference: Big Ten Conference
- Head coach: Tamara Durante; 2026 season, 0–0–0
- Field: MSU Field Hockey Complex at Ralph Young Field; Capacity: 1,500
- Location: East Lansing, Michigan
- Colors: Green and white

NCAA Tournament appearances
- 2001, 2002, 2003, 2004, 2007, 2008, 2009, 2010, 2013

The Michigan State Spartans field hockey team is the intercollegiate field hockey program representing Michigan State University. The school competes in the Big Ten Conference in Division I of the National Collegiate Athletic Association (NCAA). The Michigan State field hockey team plays its home games at the MSU Field Hockey Complex at Ralph Young Field on the university campus in East Lansing, Michigan. Since the field hockey program was established in 1972, the Spartans have won four Big Ten regular-season championships, four Big Ten tournament titles, and have appeared in the NCAA tournament nine times.

The team was coached by Helen Knull for 15 years before she stepped down after the 2025 season. Former associate head coach Tamara Durante was named the 10th head coach in program history on February 20, 2026.

== History ==
Field hockey has been a varsity sport at Michigan State University since 1972. The Spartans have competed as a member of the Big Ten Conference from 1981 to 1988 and again since 1992. From 1989 to 1991, Michigan State played in the Midwestern Collegiate Field Hockey Conference (MCFHC). Although the Spartans had never won a Big Ten championship (either in the regular-season or the tournament) or appeared in the NCAA tournament before 2001, they have found considerable success in the 21st century under the guidance of head coaches Michele Madison (1993–2005), Rolf van de Kerkhof (2006–10), and Helen Knull (2011–present). In the new millennium, Michigan State has won four Big Ten regular-season championships (2001, 2003, 2004, and 2009), four Big Ten tournament titles (2002, 2003, 2009, and 2013), and has qualified for the NCAA tournament nine times (2001, 2002, 2003, 2004, 2007, 2008, 2009, 2010, and 2013). The Spartans have advanced to the NCAA semifinals twice, in 2002 and 2004.

=== Head coaching records ===
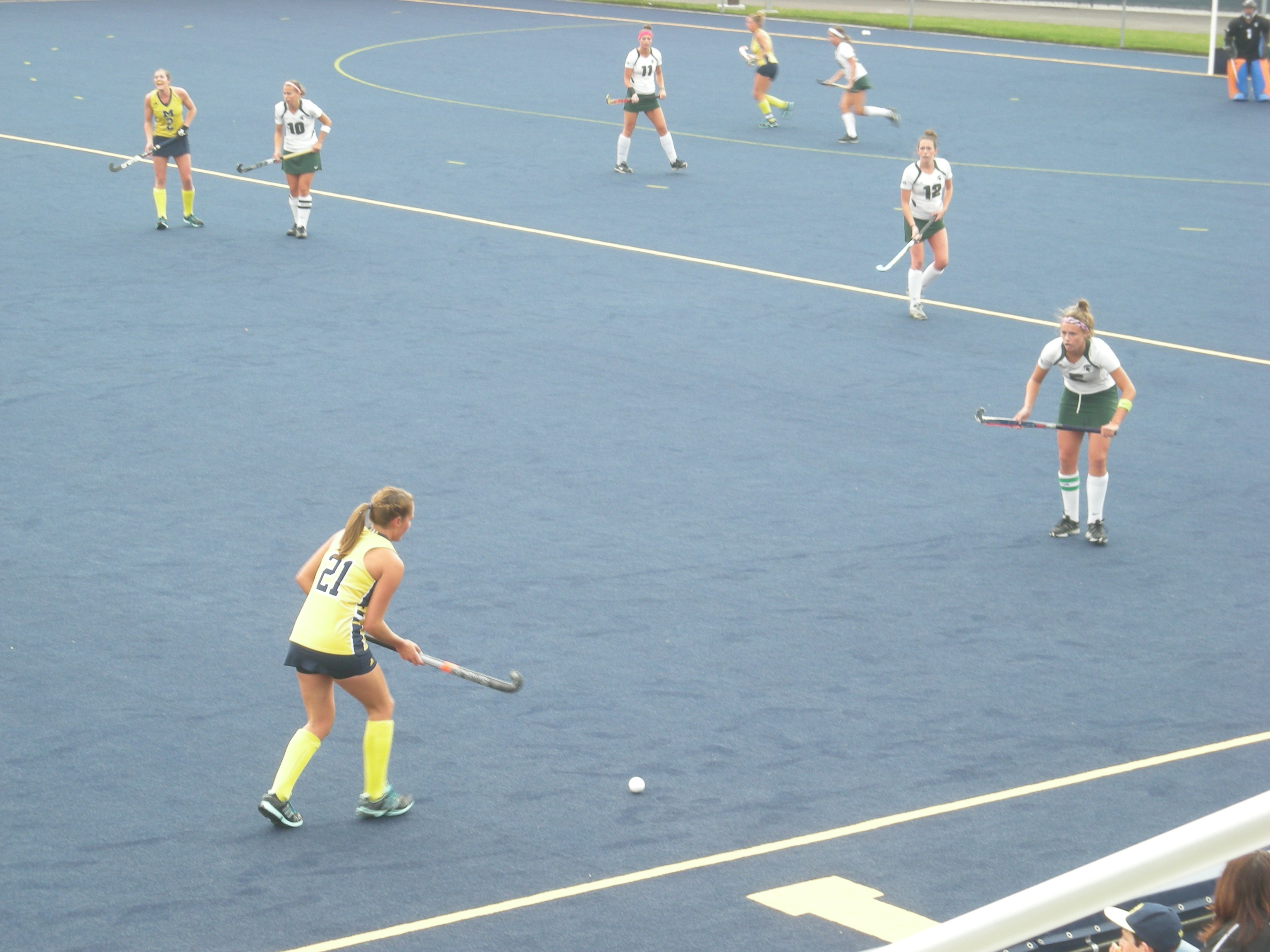
The 2014 Michigan State field hockey team in action at Michigan

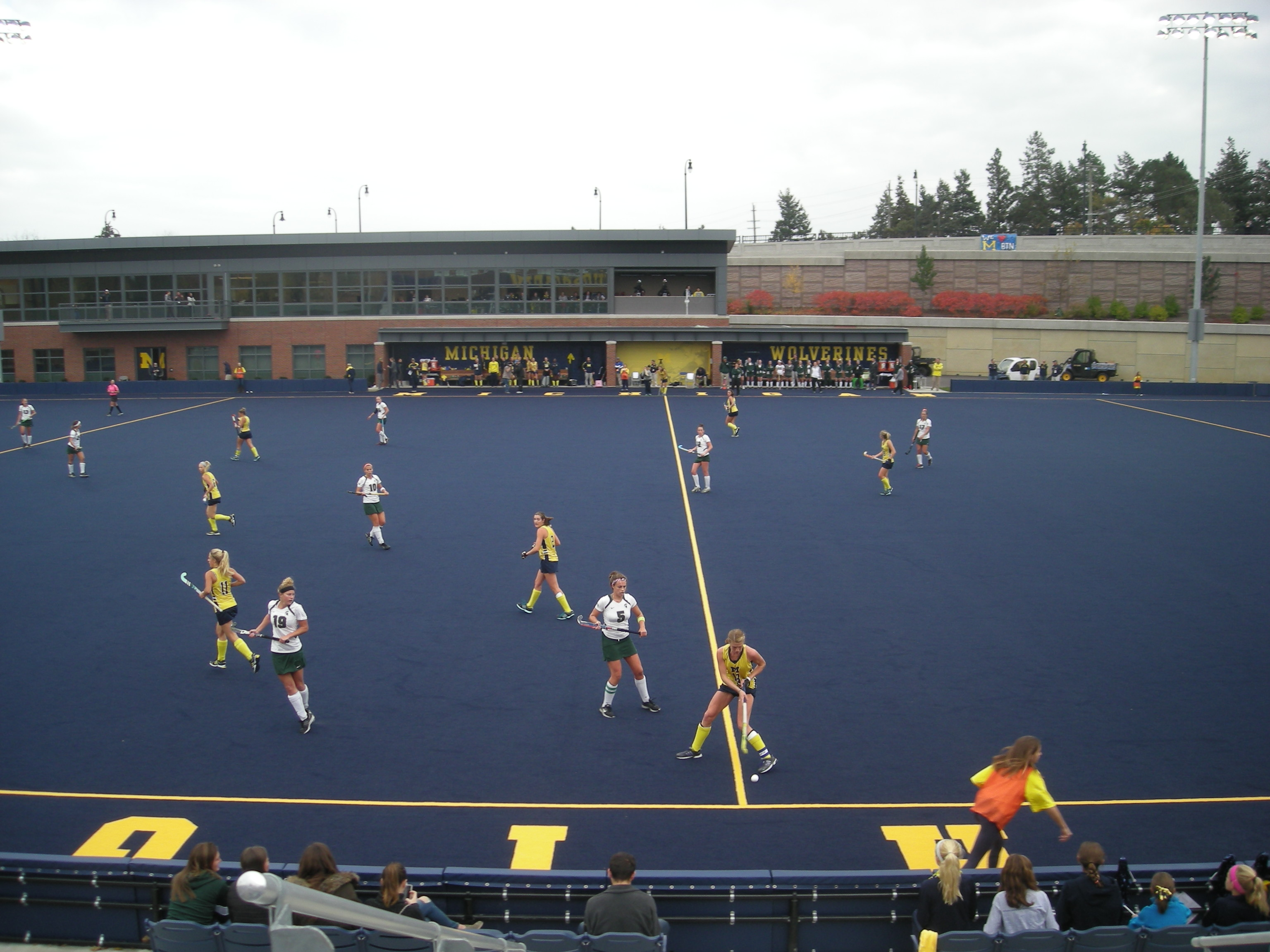

Head coach	Years	Seasons	Overall	Pct.	Best Year	NCAA Berths
Mikki Baile	1972–74	3	14–4–8	.692	1974 (8–2–1)	–
Diane Ulibarri	1975–76	2	18–4–1	.804	1976 (10–3)	–
Samnoa Kajornsin	1977–79	3	39–15–8	.694	1979 (17–8–2)	–
Nancy Reed	1980–81	2	24–17–2	.581	1981 (12–7–2)	–
Rich Kimball	1982–88	7	43–79–9	.363	1987 (9–8–5)	0
Martha Ludwig	1989–92	4	20–57–5	.274	1989 (6–12–2)	0
Michele Madison	1993–2005	13	155–116–2	.571	2002 (23–3)	4
Rolf van de Kerkhof	2006–10	5	74–34	.685	2009 (18–4)	4
Helen Knull	2011–2025	15	109-170	.391	2013 (14–10)	1
Tamara Durante	2026–					

Head coaching records through the end of the 2014 season

== Awards and accolades ==
=== Conference championships ===
Michigan State has won four regular-season conference titles, all in the Big Ten Conference.

Year	Coach	Conference Record	Conference	NCAA Result
2001	Michele Madison	5–1	Big Ten	NCAA 2nd Round
2003	Michele Madison	5–1	Big Ten	NCAA 2nd Round
2004	Michele Madison	5–1	Big Ten	NCAA Final Four
2009	Rolf van de Kerkhof	6–0	Big Ten	NCAA 2nd Round
4 Conference Championships; 4 Big Ten Championships

=== All-Americans ===
Key
First-team selection	Second-team selection	Third-team selection

Season	Player	Remarks
1991	Maggie Iezzi	
1995	Rayna Hiscox	
1995	Terry Pacheco	
1996	Rayna Hiscox	Second selection
1996	Jill Lusher	
1997	Rayna Hiscox	Third selection
1997	Jill Lusher	Second selection
1998	Melissa Pryor	
1999	Marleen Tuip	
2001	Bridget Cooper	

Season	Player	Remarks
2002	Annebet Beerman	
2002	Sophie Rosmalen	
2003	Alexandra Kyser	
2003	Sophie Rosmalen	Second selection
2004	Annebet Beerman	Second selection
2004	Veerle Goudswaard	
2005	Michelle Huynh-Ba	
2005	Christina Kirkaldy	
2007	Jeamie Deacon	
2007	Floor Rijpma	

Season	Player	Remarks
2008	Jeamie Deacon	Second selection
2008	Floor Rijpma	Second selection
2009	Jeamie Deacon	Third selection
2009	Floor Rijpma	Third selection; Second first-team selection
2012	Abby Barker	
2013	Abby Barker	Second selection
2014	Abby Barker	Third selection

Awards and accolades through the end of the 2014 season

== Stadium ==
Michigan State has played its home games at the MSU Field Hockey Complex at Ralph Young Field since September 2002. Ralph Young Field, which the field hockey program shares with the Spartan track and field team, was originally dedicated in April 1937 during a dual meet featuring Michigan State and the University of Chicago. At the turn of the 21st century, the university renovated the venue to enable it to host the field hockey team as well as its track and field counterpart. Located adjacent to Spartan Stadium, Ralph Young Field has a seating capacity of 1,500 and features an AstroTurf 12 playing surface. Its press box has a roof-mounted camera platform as well as seating for members of the media. Ralph Young Field also has permanent lighting that enables the Spartan field hockey team to play night games.

== See also ==
- List of NCAA Division I field hockey programs
