= Newtown School, Waterford =

Coordinates: 52.251518°N 7.100812°W

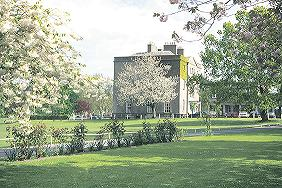
- Waterford, County Waterford; Ireland

Information
- Type: Private School; Boarding and Day School
- Motto: Education for life
- Religious affiliations: Religious Society of Friends (Quaker)
- Denomination: Multidenominational through a Quaker ethos
- Established: 1798; 228 years ago
- Principal: Keith Lemon
- Gender: Co-educational
- Age range: 12 to 18
- Enrollment: 400
- Website: newtownschool.ie

Newtown School is a multi-denominational, co-educational private school with both boarding and day pupils in Waterford, Ireland. It is run by a board of management, but owned by the Religious Society of Friends.

== History ==
Newtown School was founded in 1798 by the Religious Society of Friends (Quaker), on the estates of the former home of Sir Thomas Wyse. Its original purpose was the education of Quakers in the south of Ireland, and until 1858 no non-Quakers were admitted, although priority is still given to applicants who are Quakers. In 1924, Newtown adopted a fully co-educational policy which it has maintained to the present day.

Newtown School is a co-educational boarding and day school. Boarding facilities are offered on a three-weekly basis. Some students may opt for weekly boarding. There are two residences, for girls and boys separately. Accommodation is mostly in dorms but there are also twin and single rooms. Day students have the opportunity to become day boarders and remain in school until after evening study thus allowing them to take a full part in all aspects of school life.

== Curriculum ==
=== Junior cycle ===
For the Junior Cycle, Newtown School follows the curriculum for the Junior Certificate. All offered subjects offered are available in Higher and Ordinary levels. First Year Scholars have access to twenty-one subjects. In Second and Third Year, all Junior Certificate candidates study Art, Craft & Design and Science, may study French, German, or Spanish, and all take a practical subject, either Materials Technology (woodwork) or Home Economics, Technical graphics, business studies or music.

=== Transition year ===
Newtown School operates a compulsory Transition Year program. In recent years students have participated in kayaking, outdoor pursuits, Young Social Innovators, surfing, lifesaving courses, drama, media, personal development, nutrition, enterprise, crafts and fashion design. The programme also includes week-long work experience placements, and a European studies tour on themes pertinent to the programme, along with other courses that vary from year to year.

=== Senior cycle ===
The senior cycle begins at the end of Transition Year when students are asked to choose the subjects in which they would like to be examined at Leaving Certificate, in order of preference. The subjects offered in addition to the three compulsory subjects (English, Maths and Irish) vary each year, depending on demand (e.g. Applied Mathematics). At present, there are over 20 Leaving Certificate subjects offered, all of which are available for study at any level.

== Sports facilities ==
Newtown School has a 25m indoor swimming pool, a gym, a weights room, an astroturf hockey pitch, an athletics track, two hockey training pitches, two rugby pitches, a cricket lawn and tennis courts. A cross-country track also runs along the perimeter of the 17-acre (69,000 m^{2}) grounds.

== Notable alumni ==
- Erskine Barton Childers – writer, journalist, United Nations civil servant
- Jeamie Deacon – rugby union and field hockey player
- Ralph Fiennes – actor
- R. F. Foster – historian of the Modern Irish period
- Ian Gibson – historian, author and Hispanist
- Sinéad O'Connor – singer
- Nick Popplewell – rugby union player
- Philip Boucher-Hayes – journalist
