= 2001 NCAA Division I field hockey tournament =

Tournament details
- Host country: United States
- City: Kent, Ohio
- Dates: November 10–18, 2001
- Venue: Dix Stadium

Final positions
- Champions: Michigan (1st title)
- Runner-up: Maryland (5th title game)

Tournament statistics
- Matches played: 15
- Goals scored: 71 (4.73 per match)

The 2001 NCAA Division I field hockey tournament was the 21st annual tournament organized by the National Collegiate Athletic Association to determine the national champion of women's collegiate field hockey among its Division I members in the United States.

Michigan won their first championship, defeating Maryland in the final, 2–0.

The semifinals and championship were played at Dix Stadium in Kent, Ohio, hosted by Kent State University.

== Qualifying ==
Three teams made their debuts in the NCAA Division I field hockey tournament: Fairfield, Michigan State, and Ohio.

== Bracket ==
First round November 10; Campus sites
1	Old Dominion	6
Massachusetts	1
Princeton	4
Northeastern	1
Michigan	5
4	North Carolina	2
Michigan State	3
Kent State	1
3	Wake Forest	2
Ohio	1
Virginia	2*
Ohio State	1
2	Maryland	7
Fairfield	1
Syracuse (OT)	2
California	1

Second round November 11; Campus sites
1	Old Dominion	1
Princeton	2
Michigan	2*
Michigan State	1
3	Wake Forest	5
Virginia	1
2	Maryland	6
Syracuse	0

Semifinals; November 16; Kent, OH
Princeton	2
Michigan	4
3	Wake Forest	2
2	Maryland	3**

Championship; November 18; Kent, OH
Michigan	2
2	Maryland	0

== See also ==
- 2001 NCAA Division II field hockey tournament
- 2001 NCAA Division III field hockey tournament
