= Phil Sykes (field hockey) =

American field hockey player (born 1970)

Personal information
- Born: July 24, 1970 (age 56)
Medal record
Men's field hockey
Representing the United States
Pan American Games
Bronze medal – third place	1995 Mar del Plata	Team competition

Philip David Sykes (born July 24, 1970 in Tacoma, Washington) is a former field hockey defender from the United States, who was a member of the national team that finished twelfth at the 1996 Summer Olympics in Atlanta, Georgia.

Sykes earned his bachelor's degree in kinesiology from California State University, Hayward, in 1999.
