= Laurel Martin =

American field hockey player

Personal information
- Born: June 8, 1969 (age 57)
Medal record
Women's field hockey
Representing the United States
Champions Trophy
Bronze medal – third place	1995 Mar del Plata	Team competition
Pan American Games
Silver medal – second place	1995 Mar del Plata	Team competition
Bronze medal – third place	1991 Havana	Team competition

Laurel Hershey Martin (born June 8, 1969, in Hummelstown, Pennsylvania) is a former field hockey player from the United States, who was a member of the US women's team that finished fifth at the 1996 Summer Olympics in Atlanta, Georgia. She won a bronze medal at the 1995 Pan American Games.

== Career ==
She was the head field hockey coach at Lebanon Valley College in Annville, Pennsylvania from 2001-2011. In those 10 seasons, Martin lead Lebanon Valley to six NCAA Tournament appearances, including two Final Four and four Elite Eight berths. LVC won the 2006 Commonwealth Conference title under her guidance, one of seven CC title game appearances, and the Dutchmen achieved the nation's #1 ranking in 2010. The two-time NFCA Regional Coach of the Year had 15 all-American and 28 all-Region student-athletes pass through the program.

The 2009 season marked LVC’s fifth consecutive NCAA Tournament appearance and third Elite Eight berth in the last four years as the Dutchmen went 19-4 overall. Martin mentored a pair of all-American forwards in Shelly Lobach and national scoring leader Jocelyn Novak as LVC went to the NCAA Third Round. It was another successful season for the Dutchmen in 2008 as Martin guided them to a 19-4 record and a berth in the NCAA second round. Martin mentored three all-Americans in the process as she led LVC back to the Commonwealth Conference championship game and into the NCAA tournament for the fourth straight season. Martin directed LVC to a record-breaking season in 2007, guiding the Dutchmen to their second-straight appearance in the NCAA Division III semifinals after an undefeated regular season, the first in program history. She led the Dutchmen to a 21-2 overall record (a program record for wins), and the team sported two All-Americans and three All-Region picks. Martin was honored as the NFHCA Division III South Atlantic Region Coach of the Year for the second straight year. In 2006, her team captured the Commonwealth Conference title and advanced to the NCAA Division III Final Four. The team also tied the school record for single-season victories after finishing 20-3, and she was honored as the NFHCA Division III South Atlantic Region and Commonwealth Conference Coach of the Year. During her nine seasons at the Valley, Martin has led LVC to a stellar 150-47 record, making her the second all-time winningest coach in program history and one of just two coaches, along with Kathy Tierney, to reach 100 wins. Under Martin, Lebanon Valley has reached the NCAA final four twice, had five NCAA Tournament berths, nine appearances in the Commonwealth Conference playoffs, and won the 2004 ECAC Mid-Atlantic championship. In each of the past five seasons, Martin has coached Lebanon Valley to the Commonwealth Conference championship game. Her 2005 squad received an at-large berth in the NCAA Tournament, marking the program’s first NCAA appearance since the 2000 season. Martin has coached numerous outstanding athletes during her tenure at Lebanon Valley. Under Martin’s tutelage, 10 players have earned all-America status, as named by the NFHCA. In addition, she has coached 14 players who have received a total of 20 NFHCA All-Region awards.

Career as a player

A 1991 graduate of North Carolina, Martin was a three-time All-American and played on UNC’s 1989 National Championship team. In 1990, she was named team captain and the following year Martin competed in the World Cup.

== Accomplishments ==
Martin As A Coach • 150-47 career record (through 2009) • 58 consecutive top-20 appearances • 2 NCAA Final Four appearances • 3 NCAA Quarterfinal appearances • 5 NCAA Tournament appearances • 2 Regional Coach of the Year awards • 1 Commonwealth Conference championship • 1 ECAC Tournament championship • 6 Commonwealth Conference title game appearances • 9 Commonwealth Conference playoff appearances • 2 Commonwealth Conference Players of the Year • 3 Commonwealth Conference Rookies of the Year • 12 NFHCA All-America honorees • 25 NFHCA All-Region honorees • 8 Senior All-Star Game players • 1 NCAA Post-Graduate Scholarship recipient

Martin As A Player • 1996 U.S. Olympic Team member • 2004 inductee to the USFHA Hall of Fame • 69 international caps • 2 World Cup appearances (1990 and 1994) • 3 All-America awards at UNC • 1 National Championship at UNC
