= Sue Reid =

Canadian field hockey player

Personal information
- Born: November 10, 1970 (age 56) Nanaimo, British Columbia, Canada
Medal record
Women's field hockey
Representing Canada
Pan American Games
Bronze medal – third place	1995 Mar del Plata	Team competition

Susan "Sue" Schellinck (born November 10, 1970) is a former field hockey player from Canada, who was born as Susan Reid. She represented her native country at the 1992 Summer Olympics in Barcelona, Spain, where she ended up in seventh place with the Canadian National Team. Schellinck was inducted into the Sport Hall of Fame at Nanaimo Museum.
