= Eleanor Race =

American field hockey player

Medal record

Women's field hockey

Representing the United States

Champions Trophy
Bronze medal – third place	1995 Mar del Plata	Team competition

Pan American Games
Silver medal – second place	1995 Mar del Plata	Team competition
Silver medal – second place	1999 Winnipeg	Team competition

Eleanor Race née Stone (born November 19, 1970, in Cheshire, Connecticut) is an American field hockey player who made her international senior debut for the Women's National Team in 1991. She was a member of the team, that won the bronze medal at the 1994 World Cup in Dublin, Ireland. She won a bronze medal at the 1995 Pan American Games.

== Life ==
She was a student at the Penn State University and played as a forward.

== International senior tournaments ==
- 1994 – World Cup, Dublin, Ireland (3rd)
- 1995 – Pan American Games, Mar del Plata, Argentina (2nd)
- 1995 – Champions Trophy, Mar del Plata, Argentina (3rd)
- 1999 – Pan American Games, Winnipeg, Canada (2nd)
- 2000 – Olympic Qualifying Tournament, Milton Keynes, England (6th)
