= Julieta Castellán =

Argentine field hockey player

Personal information
- Born: August 25, 1972 (age 53)
Medal record
Women's field hockey
Representing Argentina
World Cup
Silver medal – second place	1994 Dublin	Team
Pan American Games
Gold medal – first place	1995 Mar del Plata	Team

Julieta Castellán Goytia (born August 25, 1972) is a retired female field hockey player from Argentina. She was a member of the Women's National Team that competed at the 1996 Summer Olympics, after having won the gold medal the previous year at the 1995 Pan American Games.
