= Mariana Arnal =

Argentine field hockey player

- Born: 17 August 1973 (age 52)

Mariana Arnal (born 17 August 1973) is an Argentine former field hockey player who competed in the 1996 Summer Olympics.
