= Fernando Falchetto =

Argentine field hockey player

Personal information
- Native name: Fernando Gustavo Falchetto Antognini
- National team: Argentina
- Born: August 20, 1971 (age 54)

Sport
- Sport: Field hockey

Achievements and titles
- Olympic finals: 1992 Summer Olympics: Men's field hockey, 11th

Fernando Falchetto (born 20 August 1971) is an Argentine former field hockey player who competed in the 1992 Summer Olympics.
