= List of college field hockey career coaching wins leaders =

This is a list of college field hockey career coaching wins leaders It is limited to coaches with at least 300 wins. Karen Shelton of North Carolina is the all-time leader with 745 wins. Jan Hutchinson of Bloomsburg is the all-time leader in winning percentage with a record of 591—75—20 for an .876 winning percentage.

== Key ==
*	Indicates active coaches
	300 wins with a Division I program (or historic equivalent). The list includes coaches with 300 wins regardless of division. Coaches with 300 wins at a Division I school (or historic equivalents) are designated with the referenced peach shading.

== Coaches ==
Unless otherwise noted, statistics are correct through the end of the 2025 season.

Rank	Name	Years	Wins	Losses	Ties	Pct.	Teams
1	Karen Shelton	42	745	172	9	.809	North Carolina (1981–2022)
2	Nancy Stevens	41	700	189	24	.780	Franklin & Marshall (1979-80), Northwestern (1981–1989), UConn (1990–2019)
3*	Sharon Pfluger	42	694	167	13	.801	Kean (1983), Montclair St. (1984), TCNJ (1985–present)
4	Enza Steele	41	666	247	11	.727	Lynchburg (1979–2023)
5*	Missy Meharg	38	665	180	9	.784	Maryland (1988–present)
6	Pat Rudy	45	622	249	21	.709	Franklin & Marshall (1978), SUNY Cortland (1981–1995), Lock Haven (1996–2022)
7*	Dawn Chamberlin	39	602	141	8	.807	Salisbury (1987–present)
8	Jan Hutchinson	32	591	75	20	.876	Bloomsburg (1978–2009)
9	Charlene Morett	39	575	239	17	.702	Boston College (1984–1986), Penn State (1987–2022)
10	Beth Anders	30	560	136	7	.802	Old Dominion (1980–84, 1987–2002, 2004–2013)
11	Jan Trapp	39	536	179	28	.740	Messiah (1973–2011)
12*	Sandy Miller	41	530	296	11	.640	East Stroudsburg (1984–present)
13	Sally Starr	47	520	361	21	.588	Bucknell (1979–1980), Boston U. (1981–2024)
14	Amy Watson	36	514	245	11	.675	Keene St. (1986–1989,1994–2025)
15*	Katharine DeLorenzo	34	501	134	2	.788	Oberlin (1992–1994), Skidmore (1995–2000), Middlebury (2001–present)
16	Bertie Landes	37	486	133	17	.778	Phila. Biblical (1980–1998), Shippensburg (1999–2016)
17	Sally Scatton	33	471	182	4	.720	William Smith (1988–2020)
18*	Jennifer Averill	37	461	281	6	.620	Bucknell (1989–1991), Wake Forest (1992–present)
19	Michele Madison	35	455	278	8	.619	Temple (1989–1992), Michigan State (1993–2005), Virginia (2006–2023)
20	Brenda Meese	36	426	261	10	.618	Oneonta St. (1979–1988), Wooster (1989–1992, 1994–2007, 2009–2016)
21	Cheryl Murtagh	32	407	258	13	.610	Bentley (1982–1983), Northeastern (1988–2017)
22*	Nicky Pearson	29	405	110	0	.786	Bowdoin (1996–present)
23*	Beth Hallenbeck	35	401	230	3	.635	Rensselaer (1991–2000), Skidmore, 2001–present)
24*	Ange Bradley	26	381	143	2	.726	Goucher (1991-1994), Richmond (2001–2006), Syracuse (2007–2022)
25	Dottie Zenaty	34	379	232	50	.611	Springfield (1970–2003)
26	Marcia Pankratz	25	371	161	0	.697	Michigan (1996–2004, 2009–2024)
27*	Pam Bustin	29	350	244	0	.589	Hofstra (1997), Louisville (1998–2010), Duke (2011–present)
28	Yvonne Kauffman	33	346	175	36	.654	Elizabethtown (1967–1983, 1985–2000)
29	Carol Miller	31	344	249	18	.578	Millersville (1985–1992), Delaware (1993–2010), Lebanon Valley (2011–2015)
29	Betty Wesner	33	344	257	15	.571	Kutztown (1980–2012)
31	Sharon Taylor	28	340	121	35	.721	Susquehanna (1966–69, 1971), Lock Haven (1973-1995)
32*	Robin Balducci	35	339	347	4	.494	New Hampshire (1991–present)
33	Anna Meyer	30	328	232	3	.585	Hartwick (1988–2018)
33*	Steve Jennings	27	328	179	0	.647	American (1999–present)
35	Anne Parmenter	35	321	221	7	.591	Connecticut College (1987–2000), Trinity (CT) (2001–2022)
36*	Alix Barrale	29	319	188	0	.629	Denison (1996–1999), Williams (2000–present)
37	Beth Bozman	24	318	133	6	.702	Hofstra (1987), Princeton (1988–2002), Duke (2003–2010)
38	Kathleen Parker	29	316	214	14	.594	Syracuse (1978–2006)
38*	Carrie Moura	22	316	92	0	.775	Christopher Newport (2003–present)
40	Anne Wilkinson	30	315	261	9	.546	American (1987–1995), Ohio State (1996–2016)
41*	Denise Zelenak	31	314	289	0	.521	Drexel (1995–present)
42	Cheryl Silva	29	313	200	1	.610	MIT (1991–2019)
43	Ann Petracco	33	311	306	40	.504	Rutgers (1977–2002), FDU-Florham (2003–2009)
44	Shellie Onstead	31	308	250	0	.552	California (1995–2025)
45*	Andy Whitcomb	29	307	244	1	.557	Montclair State (1996–1997), Mount Holyoke (1998–present)
46	Peel Hawthorne	30	306	251	6	.549	Connecticut College (1983–1986), William & Mary (1987–2013)
47*	Shannon LeBlanc	24	305	176	0	.634	UMass Lowell (2002–present)
48	Linda Wage	31	303	239	24	.557	Clark (MA) (1985–2015)
