= 2003 NCAA Division I field hockey tournament =

Tournament details
- Host country: United States
- City: Amherst, Massachusetts
- Dates: November 15–23, 2003
- Venue: Richard F. Garber Field

Final positions
- Champions: Wake Forest (2nd title)
- Runner-up: Duke (1st title game)

Tournament statistics
- Matches played: 15
- Goals scored: 62 (4.13 per match)

The 2003 NCAA Division I field hockey tournament was the 23rd annual tournament organized by the National Collegiate Athletic Association to determine the national champion of women's collegiate field hockey among its Division I members in the United States.

Wake Forest won their second championship, defeating Duke in the final, 3–1.

The semifinals and championship were played at Richard F. Garber Field in Amherst, Massachusetts, hosted by the University of Massachusetts Amherst.

== Qualifying ==
Two teams made their debuts in the NCAA Division I field hockey tournament: American and Louisville.

== Bracket ==
First round November 15; Campus sites
1	Wake Forest	5
Boston College	1
Connecticut	2
Northeastern	1
Michigan State	2
Louisville	0
Michigan	2
4	North Carolina	1
3	Maryland	2
California	0
Penn State	3
Princeton	1
Old Dominion	4
Richmond	2
2	Duke	3
American	1

Second round November 16; Campus sites
1	Wake Forest	3
Connecticut	0
Michigan State	1
Michigan	2
3	Maryland	5
Penn State	0
Old Dominion	2
2	Duke	8

Semifinals; November 21; Amherst, MA
1	Wake Forest	1
Michigan	0
3	Maryland	2
2	Duke	4

Championship; November 23; Amherst, MA
1	Wake Forest	3
2	Duke	1

== See also ==
- 2003 NCAA Division II field hockey tournament
- 2003 NCAA Division III field hockey tournament
