= Barb Weinberg =

American field hockey coach

Current position
- Title: Head Coach
- Team: UMass

Biographical details
- Born: Louisville, Kentucky, U.S.
- Education: Iowa

Coaching career (HC unless noted)
- 2008: Iowa (assistant)
- 2010-2012: Maryland (assistant)
- 2013: American (assistant)
- 2014-2015: Wake Forest (assistant)
- 2016: Wake Forest (associate head coach)
- 2017-present: UMass

Accomplishments and honors

Championships
- 1-time Big Ten champion (2008); 2-time ACC champion (2010, 2014); 1-time Patriot League champion (2013); 8-time NCAA tournament appearances (2008, 2010, 2011, 2012, 2013, 2014, 2015, 2024); 2-time NCAA national champion (2010, 2011); 5-time NCAA Final Four (2008, 2010, 2011, 2012, 2024)

Awards
- 2-time All-American; 3-time All-Big Ten performer

Barb Weinberg is an American field hockey coach and former player who is the head coach of the UMass Minutewomen field hockey team.

== Playing career ==
Weinberg was a 2005 graduate of the University of Iowa. At Iowa, Weinberg played for the field hockey team and had a stellar playing career, being named a two-time All-American and three-time All-Big Ten performer.

== Coaching career ==
Weinberg began her coaching career as an assistant coach for Iowa in 2008. The 2008 Hawkeyes were Big Ten champions and advanced to the NCAA Final Four.

She won two national titles with Maryland in 2010 and 2011 as an assistant. Weinberg joined Maryland in the summer of 2010 as a volunteer assistant coach, working with the goalkeeping unit. She was an assistant at Maryland from 2010 until 2012, also being a member of the team's 2010 ACC tournament title and 2012 NCAA Final Four appearance.

As an assistant at American, Weinberg helped the Eagles to a Patriot League regular season championship, Patriot League tournament championship, and NCAA tournament appearance in 2013.

With Wake Forest from 2014 to 2016, she helped the Demon Deacons to an ACC championship in 2014 and two NCAA tournament appearances in 2014 and 2015.

In 2016, Weinberg was named the associate head coach for Wake Forest.

UMass athletic director Ryan Bamford named Weinberg as head coach of UMass Minutewomen field hockey on December 15, 2016.

In 2024, Weinberg achieved her first major postseason success with the Minutewomen, leading her team to the Final Four of the 2024 NCAA Division I field hockey tournament, the program's first Final Four since 1992.

== Personal life ==
Weinberg is originally from Louisville, Kentucky.
