= 2015 NCAA Division I field hockey tournament =

2015 NCAA Division I Field Hockey Championship
Tournament details
- Country: United States
- Teams: 18

Final positions
- Champions: Syracuse (1st title)
- Runners-up: North Carolina (16th title match)

Tournament statistics
- Matches played: 17
- Goals scored: 63 (3.71 per match)

The 2015 NCAA Division I Field Hockey Championship was the 35th women's collegiate field hockey tournament organized by the NCAA, to determine the top Division I college field hockey team in the United States. The semifinals and championship match were played at the Phyllis Ocker Field in Ann Arbor, Michigan from November 20 to 22, 2015. This was the first time Michigan hosted the tournament finals.

Syracuse defeated North Carolina, 4–2, to win their first national title.

== Qualified teams ==
- A total of 18 teams qualified for the 2015 tournament, a decrease of one team from 2014. 10 teams received automatic bids by winning their conference tournaments and an additional 8 teams earned at-large bids based on their regular season records.

=== Automatic qualifiers ===
Conference	Champion	Record
America East	Albany (NY)	19–2
ACC	North Carolina	18–2
Atlantic 10	Massachusetts	11–8
Big East	Connecticut	20–0
Big Ten	Maryland	19–3
CAA	Delaware	16–5
Ivy	Princeton	10–6
MAAC	Fairfield	9–9
MAC	Kent State	11–8
Patriot	Boston University	14–6

=== At-large qualifiers ===
Team	Conference	Record
Boston College	ACC	12–8
Duke	ACC	12–6
Louisville	ACC	13–6
Michigan	Big Ten	17–4
Virginia	ACC	14–5
Stanford	MPSF	13–6
Syracuse	ACC	19–1
Wake Forest	ACC	13–5

== Bracket ==
Play-In round November 11, 2015; Campus sites
Massachusetts	1
Kent State	0
Boston U.*	6
Fairfield	1

First round November 14, 2015; Campus sites
1	Syracuse	4
Massachusetts	2
Princeton	3
Maryland	1
Albany (NY)	1
Boston College	2
Louisville	0
4	Connecticut	3
3	Virginia	4
Delaware	3
Duke	1
Stanford	0
Wake Forest	1
Michigan	2
2	North Carolina	4
Boston U.	2

Second round November 15, 2015; Campus sites
1	Syracuse	5
Princeton	0
Boston College	0
4	Connecticut	1
3	Virginia	1
Duke	2
Michigan	0
2	North Carolina	1

Semifinals; November 20, 2015; Ann Arbor, Michigan; Phyllis Ocker Field
1	Syracuse	3
4	Connecticut	1
Duke	0
2	North Carolina	2

Championship; November 22, 2015; Ann Arbor, Michigan; Phyllis Ocker Field
1	Syracuse	4
2	North Carolina	2

== All-tournament team ==
- Jess Jecko, Syracuse
- Alyssa Manley, Syracuse
- Alma Fenne, Syracuse
- Zoe Wilson, Syracuse
- Nina Notman, North Carolina
- Malin Evert, North Carolina
- Julia Young, North Carolina
- Roisin Upton, Connecticut
- Karlie Heistand, Connecticut
- Amanda Kim, Duke
- Hannah Barreca, Duke

== See also ==
- NCAA Division II Field Hockey Championship
- NCAA Division III Field Hockey Championship
