= 2013 NCAA Division I field hockey tournament =

2013 NCAA Division I Field Hockey Championship
Tournament details
- Country: United States
- Teams: 19

Final positions
- Champions: Connecticut (3rd title)
- Runners-up: Duke (4th title game)

Tournament statistics
- Matches played: 18
- Goals scored: 86 (4.78 per match)

The 2013 NCAA Division I Field Hockey Championship was the 33rd women's collegiate field hockey tournament organized by the National Collegiate Athletic Association, to determine the top college field hockey team from Division I in the United States. The Connecticut Huskies defeated the Duke Blue Devils in the finals to win their third national championship. The championship was played on November 24, 2013, at the L.R. Hill Sports Complex on the home field of the host Old Dominion Lady Monarchs in Norfolk, Virginia.

== National seeds ==
National Seeds
Seed	School	Record
#1	Maryland	20–2–1
#2	Syracuse	16–3–0
#3	North Carolina	16–5–0
#4	Duke	14–6–0

== Bracket ==
Play-In round
American	3
Quinnipiac	1
Liberty	0
Delaware	1
Miami (OH)	0
Michigan State	3

First round
1	Maryland	4
American	1
Penn State	4
Princeton	5
4	Duke	6
New Hampshire	1
Virginia	3
Massachusetts	4
3	North Carolina	6
Delaware	2
Wake Forest	3
Old Dominion	2
2	Syracuse	1
Michigan State	2
Connecticut	2
Boston College	1

Second round
1	Maryland	3
Princeton	2
4	Duke	4
Massachusetts	1
3	North Carolina	5
Wake Forest	2
Michigan State	1
Connecticut	3

Third round
1	Maryland	2
4	Duke	3
3	North Carolina	1
Connecticut	2 (2OT, PS)

Championship; Norfolk, Virginia; L.R. Hill Sports Complex
4	Duke	0
Connecticut	2
