= Big East Conference field hockey tournament =

- Conference field hockey championship
- Sport: Field Hockey
- Conference: Big East Conference
- Number of teams: 4
- Format: Single-elimination tournament
- Current stadium: Liberty Field Hockey Field
- Current location: Lynchburg, Virginia
- Played: 1989–present
- Last contest: 2025
- Current champion: Liberty
- Most championships: Connecticut (21)

The Big East Conference field hockey tournament is the conference championship tournament in field hockey for the Big East Conference. The tournament has been held every year since 1989. It is a single-elimination tournament and seeding is based on regular season records. The winner, declared conference champion, receives the conference's automatic bid to the NCAA Division I Field Hockey Championship.

== Format ==
The top four finishers from the conference regular season play a single-elimination tournament, held at a campus site which rotates among conference members.

== Champions ==
=== By year ===
Year	Champion	Site	Most Outstanding Player
1989	Providence	Chestnut Hill, MA	Chris Wajda, Connecticut
1990	Villanova	J.S. Coyne Field • Syracuse, NY	Jennifer Peacock, Villanova
1991	Providence	Chestnut Hill, MA	Debbie Hagie, Providence
1992	Connecticut	Chestnut Hill, MA	Yolanda Muntz, Connecticut
1993	Syracuse	Chestnut Hill, MA	Julie Williamson, Syracuse
1994	Boston College	Chestnut Hill, MA	Sarah Egnaczyk, Boston College
1995	Syracuse	Chestnut Hill, MA	Cheri Herr, Syracuse
1996	Connecticut	George J. Sherman Family-Sports Complex • Storrs, CT	Wendy Brady, Connecticut
1997	Boston College	Chestnut Hill, MA	Andrea Durko, Boston College
1998	Connecticut	Villanova Stadium • Villanova, PA	Alison Sharpe, Connecticut
1999	Connecticut	J.S. Coyne Field • Syracuse, NY	Nicole Castonguay, Connecticut
2000	Connecticut	George J. Sherman Sports Complex • Storrs, CT	Katie Stephens, Connecticut
2001	Syracuse	Chestnut Hill, MA	Michelle Aronowicz, Syracuse
2002	Connecticut	J.S. Coyne Field • Syracuse, NY	Lauren Henderson, Connecticut
2003	Boston College	Chestnut Hill, MA	Bronwen Kelly, Boston College
2004	Connecticut	J.S. Coyne Field • Syracuse, NY	Lauren Henderson, Connecticut
2005	Connecticut	Bauer Field • Piscataway, NJ	Meagan Hoffman, Connecticut
2006	Connecticut	Trager Stadium • Louisville, KY	Lauren Aird, Connecticut
2007	Connecticut	J.S. Coyne Field • Syracuse, NY	Katie Semanoff, Connecticut
2008	Syracuse	George J. Sherman Sports Complex • Storrs, CT	Shannon Taylor, Syracuse
2009	Connecticut	Lennon Family Field • Providence, RI	Loren Sherer, Connecticut
2010	Syracuse	George J. Sherman Sports Complex • Storrs, CT	Lindsey Conrad, Syracuse
2011	Syracuse	J.S. Coyne Field • Syracuse, NY	Lauren Brooks, Syracuse
2012	Connecticut	Trager Stadium • Louisville, KY	Louisa Boddy, Connecticut
2013	Connecticut	George J. Sherman Sports Complex • Storrs, CT	Chloe Hunnable, Connecticut
2014	Connecticut	Lennon Family Field • Providence, RI	Roisin Upton, Connecticut
2015	Connecticut	L.R. Hill Sports Complex • Norfolk, VA	Charlotte Veitner, Connecticut
2016	Connecticut	Howarth Field • Philadelphia, PA	Amanda Collins, Connecticut
2017	Connecticut	Lennon Family Field • Providence, RI	Amanda Collins, Connecticut
2018	Connecticut	Liberty Field Hockey Field • Lynchburg, VA	Cécile Pieper, Connecticut
2019	Connecticut	Quinnipiac Field Hockey Stadium • Hamden, CT	Svea Boker, Connecticut
2020	Connecticut	The Proving Grounds • Conshohocken, PA	Sophie Hamilton, Connecticut
2021	Liberty	George J. Sherman Sports Complex • Storrs, CT	Jill Bolton, Liberty
2022	Liberty	L.R. Hill Sports Complex • Norfolk, VA	Azul Iritxity Irigoyen, Liberty
2023	Old Dominion	Howarth Field • Philadelphia, PA	Nicole Fredricks, Old Dominion
2024	Connecticut	Lennon Family Field • Providence, RI	Natalie McKenna, Connecticut
2025	Liberty	Liberty Field Hockey Field • Lynchburg, VA	Lou Combrinck, Liberty

=== By school ===
School	Championships	Years
Connecticut	20	1992, 1996, 1998, 1999, 2000, 2002, 2004, 2005, 2006, 2007, 2009, 2012, 2013, 2014, 2015, 2016, 2017, 2018, 2019, 2020, 2024
Syracuse	6	1993, 1995, 2001, 2008, 2010, 2011
Boston College	3	1994, 1997, 2003
Liberty	3	2021, 2022, 2025
Providence	2	1989, 1991
Old Dominion	1	2023
Villanova	1	1990
