= List of NCAA Division I field hockey programs =

The following is a list of schools that participate in NCAA Division I field hockey, according to NCAA.org. In the most recent 2025 season, 83 Division I schools have competed.

Conference affiliations are as of the coming 2026 NCAA field hockey season. These reflect field hockey affiliations, which do not necessarily match schools' primary affiliations.

== Division I programs ==
School	Nickname	Conference	Home field	National titles
Albany	Great Danes	America East	Alumni Turf Field	
Bryant	Bulldogs	America East	Bryant Turf Complex	
Maine	Black Bears	America East	UMaine Field Hockey Complex	
New Hampshire	Wildcats	America East	Memorial Field	
UMass Lowell	River Hawks	America East	Cushing Field Complex	
Vermont	Catamounts	America East	Moulton Winder Field	
Davidson	Wildcats	Atlantic 10	Carol Grotnes Belk Turf Field	
La Salle	Explorers	Atlantic 10	Hank DeVincent Field	
Lock Haven	Bald Eagles	Atlantic 10	Charlotte E. Smith Field	
Richmond	Spiders	Atlantic 10	Crenshaw Field	
Saint Joseph's	Hawks	Atlantic 10	Ellen Ryan Field	
Saint Louis	Billikens	Atlantic 10	SLU Field Hockey Complex	
VCU	Rams	Atlantic 10	Cary Street Field	
Boston College	Eagles	ACC	Newton Field Hockey Complex	
California	Golden Bears	ACC	Maxwell Family Field	
Duke	Blue Devils	ACC	Jack Katz Stadium	
Louisville	Cardinals	ACC	Trager Stadium	
North Carolina	Tar Heels	ACC	Karen Shelton Stadium	1989, 1995, 1996, 1997, 2007, 2009, 2018, 2019, 2020, 2022, 2023
Stanford	Cardinal	ACC	Varsity Field Hockey Stadium	
Syracuse	Orange	ACC	J.S. Coyne Stadium	2015
Virginia	Cavaliers	ACC	University Hall Turf Field	
Wake Forest	Demon Deacons	ACC	Kentner Stadium	2002, 2003, 2004
Georgetown	Hoyas	Big East	Cooper Field	
Liberty	Lady Flames	Big East	Liberty Field Hockey Field	
Old Dominion	Monarchs	Big East	L.R. Hill Sports Complex	1982, 1983, 1984, 1988, 1990, 1991, 1992, 1998, 2000
Providence	Friars	Big East	Lennon Family Field	
Temple	Owls	Big East	Howarth Field	
UConn	Huskies	Big East	George J. Sherman Family-Sports Complex	1981, 1985, 2013, 2014, 2017
Villanova	Wildcats	Big East	Villanova Stadium	
Indiana	Hoosiers	Big Ten	Deborah Tobias Field	
Iowa	Hawkeyes	Big Ten	Dr. Christine H. B. Grant Field	1986
Maryland	Terrapins	Big Ten	Maryland Field Hockey & Lacrosse Complex	1987, 1993, 1999, 2005, 2006, 2008, 2010, 2011
Michigan	Wolverines	Big Ten	Phyllis Ocker Field	2001
Michigan State	Spartans	Big Ten	MSU Field Hockey Complex at Ralph Young Field	
Northwestern	Wildcats	Big Ten	Lakeside Field	2021, 2024, 2025
Ohio State	Buckeyes	Big Ten	Buckeye Varsity Field	
Penn State	Nittany Lions	Big Ten	Penn State Field Hockey Complex	
Rutgers	Scarlet Knights	Big Ten	Bauer Track and Field/Field Hockey Complex	
Drexel	Dragons	CAA	Buckley Field	
Fairfield	Stags	CAA	University Field	
Hofstra	Pride	CAA	Hofstra Field Hockey Stadium	
Monmouth	Hawks	CAA	So Sweet a Cat Field	
Northeastern	Huskies	CAA	Dedham Field	
Towson	Tigers	CAA	Johnny Unitas Stadium	
William & Mary	Tribe	CAA	Busch Field	
Brown	Bears	Ivy League	Goldberger Family Field	
Columbia	Lions	Ivy League	Columbia Field Hockey Stadium	
Cornell	Big Red	Ivy League	Dodson Field	
Dartmouth	Big Green	Ivy League	Chase Astroturf Field	
Harvard	Crimson	Ivy League	Berylson Family Field Hockey Field	
Penn	Quakers	Ivy League	Ellen Vagelos Field	
Princeton	Tigers	Ivy League	Bedford Field	2012
Yale	Bulldogs	Ivy League	Johnson Field	
App State	Mountaineers	MAC	Adcock Field Hockey Complex	
Ball State	Cardinals	MAC	Ball State Turf Field	
Bellarmine	Knights	MAC	Owsley B. Frazier Stadium	
Central Michigan	Chippewas	MAC	Cristy Freese Field	
James Madison	Dukes	MAC	JMU Field Hockey Complex	1994
Kent State	Golden Flashes	MAC	Murphy-Mellis Field	
Longwood	Lancers	MAC	Longwood University Athletics Complex	
Miami (OH)	RedHawks	MAC	Miami Field Hockey Complex	
Ohio	Bobcats	MAC	Pruitt Field	
UMass	Minutewomen	MAC	Gladchuk Sports Complex	
Delaware	Fightin' Blue Hens	MPSF (MAC in 2027)	Fred P. Rullo Stadium	2016
Queens (NC)	Royals	MPSF	Bessant Field	
UC Davis	Aggies	MPSF	Aggie Field Hockey Facility	
LIU	Sharks	NEC	Bethpage Federal Credit Union Stadium	
Mercyhurst	Lakers	NEC	Saxon Stadium	
Merrimack	Warriors	NEC	Duane Stadium	
New Haven	Chargers	NEC	Ralph F. DellaCamera Stadium	
Quinnipiac	Bobcats	NEC	Quinnipiac University Field Hockey/Lacrosse Field	
Rider	Broncs	NEC	Ben Cohen Field	
Sacred Heart	Pioneers	NEC	Johnson Field (Note: Sacred Heart plays its home games at Yale's field hockey venue.)	
Stonehill	Skyhawks	NEC	W.B. Mason Stadium	
Wagner	Seahawks	NEC	Wagner College Field Hockey Complex	
American	Eagles	Patriot	Jacobs Recreational Complex	
Boston University	Terriers	Patriot	Nickerson Field	
Bucknell	Bison	Patriot	Graham Field	
Colgate	Raiders	Patriot	Tyler’s Field	
Holy Cross	Crusaders	Patriot	Hart Turf Field	
Lafayette	Leopards	Patriot	Rappolt Field	
Lehigh	Mountain Hawks	Patriot	Ulrich Sports Complex	
