= Saint Joseph's Hawks field hockey =

College field hockey team

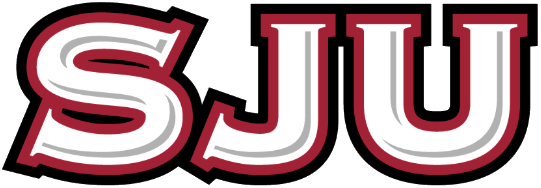
- University: Saint Joseph's University
- Head coach: Sam Brown
- Stadium: Ellen Ryan Field
- Location: Philadelphia, Pennsylvania
- Conference: Atlantic 10
- Nickname: Hawks
- Colors: Crimson and gray

NCAA Tournament Runner-Up
- 2024

NCAA Tournament Final Fours
- 2024

NCAA Tournament appearances
- 2017, 2018, 2019, 2021, 2022, 2023, 2024, 2025, 2026

Conference Tournament championships
- 1995, 2017, 2018, 2019, 2021, 2022, 2023, 2024, 2025, 2026

The Saint Joseph's Hawks field hockey team represents Saint Joseph's University in NCAA Division I field hockey competition. They compete in the Atlantic 10 Conference. The Hawks are led by head coach Sam Brown. Saint Joseph's plays their home games at Ellen Ryan Field.

== History ==
The Hawks began field hockey competition in the 1975 season.

In 2024, Saint Joseph's made the program's deepest NCAA tournament run in school history, making it to the 2024 national championship game. The Hawks lost in the title game to Northwestern. 2024 also marked the program’s first Final Four appearance.

In the 2025 NCAA tournament, Saint Joseph's won its opening round game over #20 Drexel 2-0. In the first round, the Hawks lost to #1 North Carolina 2-1.

In March 2026, Saint Joseph’s named Sam Brown as the field hockey program’s new head coach.

In 2026, Saint Joseph's defeated Vermont in the NCAA tournament opening round before losing to #1 Northwestern 5-0.

== See also ==
- List of NCAA Division I field hockey programs
