= 1997 NCAA Division I field hockey tournament =

Tournament details
- Host country: United States
- City: Storrs, Connecticut
- Dates: November 15–23, 1997
- Venue: Sherman Family Sports Complex

Final positions
- Champions: North Carolina (4th title)
- Runner-up: Old Dominion (10th title game)

Tournament statistics
- Matches played: 11
- Goals scored: 64 (5.82 per match)

The 1997 NCAA Division I field hockey tournament was the 17th women's collegiate field hockey tournament organized by the National Collegiate Athletic Association, to determine the top college field hockey team in the United States.

North Carolina won their third championship, defeating Old Dominion in the final, 3–2.

The championship rounds were held at the Sherman Family Sports Complex on the main campus of the University of Connecticut in Storrs, Connecticut.

== Bracket ==
First round November 15; Campus sites
Connecticut	1
James Madison	0
Princeton	3
Boston College	2
Ball State	5
Northeastern	0
Penn State	5
Massachusetts	3

Second round November 16; Campus sites
1	North Carolina	4
Connecticut	0
4	Maryland	0
Princeton	4
2	Old Dominion	9
Ball State	3
3	Virginia	4
Penn State	2

Semifinals; November 21; Storrs, CT
1	North Carolina	4
Princeton	3
2	Old Dominion	3
3	Virginia	2

Championship; November 23; Storrs, CT
1	North Carolina	3
2	Old Dominion	2

- * indicates overtime period
- † indicates penalty shoot-out

== See also ==
- 1997 NCAA Division II field hockey tournament
- 1997 NCAA Division III field hockey tournament
