= Nancy Stevens =

American field hockey coach

Current position
- Title: Volunteer assistant coach
- Team: UConn
- Conference: Big East Conference

Playing career
- 1972–1975: West Chester

Coaching career (HC unless noted)
- 1990–2019: UConn
- 1981–1989: Northwestern
- 1979–1980: Franklin & Marshall
- 1977–1979: Penn State (Asst.)

Head coaching record
- Overall: 700–189–24

Nancy Stevens is an American field hockey coach, most notable for serving as the head coach of the UConn Huskies field hockey team. She served as head coach for 30 seasons, compiling a 700–189–24 record, the most wins of any field hockey coach in Division I.

She has made 17 NCAA Tournaments and won 12 Big East championships, a record. After UConn defeated Louisville 6–0 on October 11, 2013, Stevens passed Beth Anders for most wins all time of any Division I field hockey coach. Stevens won her first national championship in 2013 when the Huskies beat the Duke Blue Devils 2–0 in the national championship game. Stevens and the Huskies would repeat as champions the following year with a 1–0 win over Syracuse in the final.

She also coached at Northwestern University for nine years and Franklin & Marshall College for two years.
