= 2014 NCAA Division I field hockey tournament =

2014 NCAA Division I Field Hockey Championship
Tournament details
- Country: United States
- Teams: 19

Final positions
- Champions: Connecticut (4th title)
- Runners-up: Syracuse (1st title game)

Tournament statistics
- Matches played: 18
- Goals scored: 65 (3.61 per match)

The 2014 NCAA Division I Field Hockey Championship is the 34th women's collegiate field hockey tournament organized by the National Collegiate Athletic Association, to determine the top college field hockey team from Division I in the United States. The championship was played on November 23, 2014 at the Maryland Field Hockey & Lacrosse Complex, the home field of the host Maryland Terrapins, in College Park, Maryland. The Connecticut Huskies won their fourth national championship, and second consecutive title, by defeating the Syracuse Orange, 1–0, in the final match.

== National seeds ==
National Seeds
Seed	School	Record
#1	North Carolina	17–3–0
#2	Maryland	18–3–0
#3	Connecticut	16–3–0
#4	Syracuse	15–5–0

== Bracket ==
Play-In round
Richmond	1
Liberty	3
Kent State	2
Delaware	1
Princeton	4
Monmouth	3

First round
1	North Carolina	2
Liberty	1
Duke	2
Northwestern	1
4	Syracuse	2
Boston U.	1
Penn State	2
Boston College	1
3	Connecticut	6
Kent State	1
Louisville	1
Stanford	2
2	Maryland	5
Princeton	1
Wake Forest	1
Albany	2

Second round
1	North Carolina	3
Duke	0
4	Syracuse	3
Penn State	1
3	Connecticut	3
Stanford	1
2	Maryland	1
Albany	2

Third round
1	North Carolina	2
4	Syracuse	3
3	Connecticut	1
Albany	0

Championship; College Park, Maryland; Maryland Field Hockey & Lacrosse Complex
4	Syracuse	0
3	Connecticut	1
