= UMass Minutewomen field hockey =

College field hockey team

- University: University of Massachusetts Amherst
- Head coach: Barb Weinberg (10th season)
- Stadium: Gladchuk Field Hockey Complex
- Location: Amherst, Massachusetts
- Conference: Mid-American Conference
- Nickname: Minutewomen
- Colors: Maroon and white

NCAA Tournament Runner-Up
- 1981

NCAA Tournament Final Fours
- 1981, 1983, 1987, 1992, 2024

NCAA Tournament Quarterfinals
- 1983, 1987, 1989, 1990, 1992, 1993, 1999, 2000, 2013, 2024

NCAA Tournament appearances
- 1982, 1983, 1984, 1985, 1986, 1987, 1988, 1989, 1990, 1991, 1992, 1993, 1996, 1997, 1998, 1999, 2000, 2001, 2007, 2008, 2010, 2012, 2013, 2015, 2016, 2024, 2026

Conference Tournament championships
- 1988, 1992, 1993, 1996, 1997, 1998, 1999, 2000, 2001, 2007, 2008, 2010, 2012, 2013, 2015, 2016

The UMass Minutewomen field hockey is the team represents the University of Massachusetts Amherst in the sport of field hockey in the NCAA Division I level Mid-American Conference. The team is coached by Barb Weinberg. The Minutewomen have been runner-up once in the national championship in 1981. They have been to the NCAA Final Four in Field Hockey five times in their history, in 1981, 1983, 1987, 1992, and 2024.

== History ==
The UMass field hockey team began competition in 1975, initially competing in AIAW-sponsored tournaments between 1975 and 1980. Then starting in 1981, the Minutewomen began to compete in the newly founded NCAA Division I field hockey tournament. In the inaugural NCAA tournament in 1981, UMass made it to the NCAA championship game where they lost to the UConn Huskies.

To date, the 1981 run to the national title game is the team's best finish in the national tournament. UMass began to compete in Atlantic 10 field hockey tournaments in 1988, in which they have won 16 Atlantic 10 championships. The Minutewomen have appeared in five NCAA Final Fours, most recently in 2024.

Starting in 2025, the Minutewomen play in the Mid-American Conference.

== Stadium ==
The Minutewomen play their games at the Gladchuk Field Hockey Complex in Amherst, Massachusetts. The team has played its games at the Gladchuk Complex since Fall 2015, previously playing at Garber Field from 1997 to 2014.

== See also ==
- List of NCAA Division I field hockey programs
