= Fairfield Stags field hockey =

College field hockey team

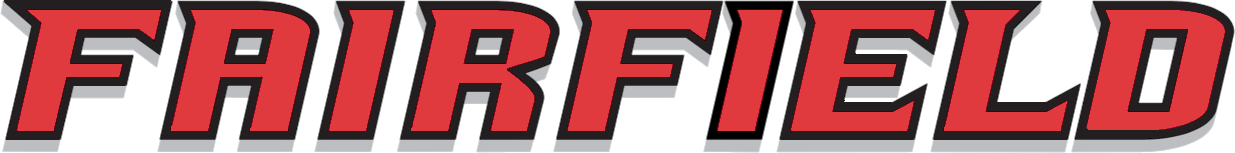
- Founded: 1974
- University: Fairfield University
- Head coach: Laura Gebhart
- Location: Fairfield, Connecticut, U.S.
- Conference: Coastal Athletic Association (CAA)
- Nickname: Stags
- Colors: Red

NCAA Tournament appearances
- 2001, 2015, 2017, 2019, 2021, 2024, 2025, 2026

The Fairfield Stags field hockey team represents Fairfield University in NCAA Division I field hockey competition. The Stags compete in the Coastal Athletic Association (CAA). Fairfield is led by head coach Laura Gebhart.

== History ==
Fairfield field hockey began as a club sport in 1974, becoming a varsity sport in 1980 at the NCAA Division III level. In 1982, the Stags gained NCAA Division I status.

The 2001 team with an 11-10 record won the Patriot League tournament title and made the program's first NCAA tournament appearance, losing to Maryland in round 1.

In 2015, Fairfield won the Metro Atlantic Athletic Conference (MAAC) tournament title over Quinnipiac and qualified for the NCAA tournament despite a losing 9-10 record. The Stags lost to Boston University 6-1 in the first round.

In 2017, the Stags won their second MAAC tournament title in 3 years, defeating Monmouth in the finals and qualifying for the NCAA tournament despite a 9-12 overall record. They lost to Boston University 5-0 in the first round.

In 2019, Fairfield had a record-breaking 19-3 season that led to the program's first NCAA tournament victory 3-1 over American in the opening round play-in game. In the first round the Stags lost to UConn. The 19-win season surpassed the previous record of 14 wins held by the 2008 team.

In 2021, the Stags lost in the NCAA tournament first round to Delaware 4-3 in OT.

In 2024, Fairfield lost in the NCAA tournament first round to Delaware 2-1.

In 2025, the Stags defeated Boston University 1-0 in the NCAA tournament opening round. In the first round they lost to Princeton 3-1.

In 2026, Fairfield defeated Monmouth 2-1 to win the CAA tournament title, they lost in the NCAA tournament first round to Wagner 1-0.

== See also ==
- List of NCAA Division I field hockey programs
