= Didio =

Didio or DiDio is a surname. Notable people with the surname include:

- Mark Didio (born 1969), American football player
- Marisa Didio (born 1956), American field hockey coach
- Dan DiDio (born 1959), American writer, editor, and publisher

== See also ==
- Palmiro Di Dio (born 1985), Italian footballer
