= Róisín Upton =

Ireland women's hockey international

Personal information
- Born: 1 April 1994 (age 32) Limerick, Ireland
- Height: 5 ft 5 in (165 cm)

Sport
- Sport: Field hockey
- Position: Midfielder, defender
National team
Years	Team	Caps	Goals
2016–	Ireland	159	(52)
Medal record
FIH World Cup
Silver medal – second place	2018 London
FIH Nations Cup
Silver medal – second place	2023–24 Terrassa
Silver medal – second place	2024–25 Santiago

Róisín Upton (born 1 April 1994) is an Ireland women's field hockey international and Irish Hockey League club Catholic Institute. She was a member of the Ireland team that played in the 2018 Women's Hockey World Cup final.

Upton was also a member of the Connecticut Huskies teams that won the 2013 and 2014 NCAA Division I Field Hockey Championships.

== Early years and education ==
Upton is the daughter of Dermot and Pauline Upton and is originally from Janesboro on the south side of the city. She has two older brothers, Diarmaid and Sean, both of whom have played rugby union for Munster at schoolboy level and have played for Young Munster in the All-Ireland League. Upton attended An Mhodh Scoil and Crescent College before studying at the University of Connecticut where she gained a BA in Psychology. In 2019 she completed her two years Masters in Primary education in Mary Immaculate College Limerick. As well as playing field hockey in her youth, Upton also played ladies' Gaelic football for Mungret St.Pauls winning numerous County medals.She also won a munster and All-Ireland title with Limerick underage football. and women's association football for Janesboro Football club.

== Domestic teams ==
=== Early years ===
Upton started playing field hockey at Crescent College and then subsequently with Catholic Institute. She helped Crescent College win two Munster Schools Junior Cup and two Senior Cup titles. She also captained the Crescent College team. She helped Catholic Institute challenge for Munster club honours.

Munster and Ireland youth player of the year in 2011

=== Connecticut Huskies ===
Between 2012 and 2016 Upton attended the University of Connecticut. During this time she was a prominent member of the Connecticut Huskies teams that won the 2013 and 2014 NCAA Division I Field Hockey Championships. Upton captained the team during the 2014 season and in 2014 and 2015 was nominated for the Honda Sports Award. Upton also helped the team win four consecutive Big East Conference Field Hockey Tournaments between 2012 and 2015. During her time with the Connecticut Huskies, Upton also worked as a member of the teams coaching staff.

=== Cork Harlequins ===
In November 2016 Upton began playing for Cork Harlequins in the Women's Irish Hockey League. Her teammates at Harlequins include Yvonne O'Byrne. Upton, along with O'Byrne and Naomi Carroll, played for Harlequins in the 2017 Irish Senior Cup final, losing 1–0 to UCD. In 2017–18 she helped Harlequins finish as runners up in both the Women's Irish Hockey League and the EY Champions Trophy.

=== Catholic Institute ===
In 2018 Upton re-joined Catholic Institute as they became founder members of the Women's Irish Hockey League Division 2.

== International career ==
Róisín Upton made her senior debut for the Ireland women's field hockey team in 2016. She quickly established herself as a key midfielder and penalty corner specialist. Upton has earned 159 senior caps for Ireland, scoring 52 goals, with most coming from penalty corners and penalty strokes. She reached her 100th cap milestone in December 2022. Her 150th cap in June 2026.

Upton has had standout performances in major tournaments. At the 2019 EuroHockey Championship, she scored four goals against Belarus, helping Ireland secure a decisive victory. She has also contributed important goals in World Cup qualifiers, Nations Cup matches, and the FIH Olympic Qualifiers. Her most recent goal was scored on 20 August 2026 in the World Cup against New Zealand.

=== Historic Olympic Achievement ===
Upton played a pivotal role in Ireland's qualification for the Tokyo 2020 Olympics. She scored the winning goal in the Olympic qualifier shootout against Canada, securing Ireland's first-ever Olympic appearance in women's hockey.

At the Tokyo 2020 Olympics, Upton became the first Irish female hockey player, to score at an Olympic Games. She scored in Ireland's opening match against South Africa on 24 July 2021, converting a penalty corner in the 9th minute to give Ireland an early lead. The match ended in a 2–0 victory, marking Ireland's first-ever win in Olympic women's hockey.

== Ireland international ==
Together with Emily Beatty and Katie Mullan, Upton represented Ireland at the 2010 Youth Olympic Games. Graham Shaw first included Upton in an Ireland squad in 2015. In January 2016 she was also included in a squad for series of away games against Spain. However, on both occasions Upton had to withdraw from the squads because of injuries. She eventually made her senior debut on 6 November 2016 against Scotland. In January 2017 she was a member of the Ireland team that won a 2016–17 Women's FIH Hockey World League Round 2 tournament in Kuala Lumpur, defeating Malaysia 3–0 in the final. Upton scored four goals in the tournament. On 17 January 2017 she scored her first senior Ireland goal in a 10–0 win against Hong Kong. On 19 January 2017 she scored a hat-trick in a 10–0 against Singapore.

Upton represented Ireland at the 2018 Women's Hockey World Cup and was a prominent member of the team that won the silver medal. She featured in all of Ireland's games throughout the tournament, including the pool games against the United States, India and England, the quarter-final against India, the semi-final against Spain and the final against the Netherlands. In opening game against the United States, Upton provided an assist for Anna O'Flanagan. In the quarter-final against India, she was the first Ireland player to score in the penalty shoot-out.

=== International Goals ===
Goal	Date	Location	Opponent	Score	Result	Competition
1.	17 January 2017	Kula Lumpur, Malaysia	Hong Kong	1–0	10–0	2017 World League Round 2
2.	19 January 2017	Kula Lumpur, Malaysia	Singapore	4–0	10–0	2017 World League Round 2
3.	19 January 2017	Kula Lumpur, Malaysia	Singapore	5–0	10–0	2017 World League Round 2
4.	19 January 2017	Kula Lumpur, Malaysia	Singapore	8–0	10–0	2017 World League Round 2
5.	16 June 2017	Berlin, Germany	China	2–2	2–5	2017 4 Nations Invitational
6.	8 July 2017	Johannesburg, South Africa	Japan	1–0	1–1	2016–17 World League Semifinals
7.	18 July 2017	Johannesburg, South Africa	Argentina	1–2	1–2	2016–17 World League Semifinals
8.	24 August 2017	Amstelveen, Netherlands	Czech Republic	2–1	3–1	2017 EuroHockey
9.	11 June 2019	Banbridge, Ireland	Singapore	4–0	11–0	2018–19 FIH Series Finals
10.	11 June 2019	Banbridge, Ireland	Singapore	6–0	11–0	2018–19 FIH Series Finals
11.	19 August 2019	Antwerp, Belgium	Belarus	1–0	11–0	2019 EuroHockey
12.	19 August 2019	Antwerp, Belgium	Belarus	5–0	11–0	2019 EuroHockey
13.	19 August 2019	Antwerp, Belgium	Belarus	7–0	11–0	2019 EuroHockey
14.	19 August 2019	Antwerp, Belgium	Belarus	11–0	11–0	2019 EuroHockey
15.	26 January 2020	Stellenbosch, South Africa	South Africa	3–0	5–1	2020 Test matches vs South Africa
16.	28 January 2020	Stellenbosch, South Africa	South Africa	2–1	2–1	2020 Test matches vs South Africa
17.	9 June 2021	Amstelveen, Netherlands	Spain	1–0	1–1	2021 EuroHockey
18.	24 July 2021	Tokyo, Japan	South Africa	1–0	2–0	2020 Olympic Games
19.	21 October 2021	Pisa, Italy	France	1–0	4–1	2022 World Cup European Qualifier
20.	2 July 2022	Wagener Stadium, Amstelveen	Netherlands	1–2	1–5	2022 World Cup
21.	10 July 2022	Wagener Stadium, Amstelveen	South Africa	2–0	2–0	2022 World Cup
22.	18 August 2022	National Sports Campus, Dublin, Ireland	Poland	2–0	3–0	2023 Women's EuroHockey Qualifiers
23.	18 August 2022	National Sports Campus, Dublin, Ireland	Poland	3–0	3–0	2023 Women's EuroHockey Qualifiers
24.	21 August 2022	National Sports Campus, Dublin, Ireland	Turkey	6–0	7–0	2023 Women's EuroHockey Qualifiers
25.	24 August 2023	Warsteiner HockeyPark, Germany	Spain	1–0	2–2	2023 EuroHockey
26.	15 January 2024	Estadio Beteró, Valencia, Spain	Ukraine	5–0	8–0	2024 Olympic Qualifiers
27.	16 January 2024	Estadio Beteró, Valencia, Spain	South Korea	3–1	3–1	2024 Olympic Qualifiers
28.	6 June 2024	Terrassa, Spain	South Korea	4–0	4–0	2023–24 Nations Cup
29.	1 March 2025	Santiago, Chile	United States	1–1	2–1	2024–25 Nations Cup
30.	15 August 2025	Warsteiner HockeyPark, Germany	Scotland	1–0	2–3	2025 EuroHockey
31.	2 March 2026	Santiago, Chile	Malaysia	5–0	5–0	2026 World Cup Qualifiers

Tournaments	Place
2010 Youth Olympic Games	5th
2016–17 Women's FIH Hockey World League	13th
→ 2017 Kuala Lumpur Tournament	1st
2017 Women's Four Nations Cup	2nd
2017 Women's EuroHockey Nations Championship	6th
2018 Women's Hockey World Cup	2nd place, silver medalist(s)
2018–19 Women's FIH Series Finals	2nd
2019 Women's EuroHockey Nations Championship	5th

== Honours ==
Ireland

- Women's Hockey World Cup
  - Runners Up: 2018
- Women's FIH Hockey World League
  - Winners: 2017 Kuala Lumpur Tournament
- Women's FIH Hockey Series
  - Runners Up: 2019 Banbridge
- Women's Four Nations Cup
  - Runners Up: 2017

TOYKO OLYMPICS 2020

Connecticut Huskies

- NCAA Division I Field Hockey Championship
  - Winners: 2013, 2014
- Big East Conference Field Hockey Tournament
  - Winners: 2012, 2013, 2014, 2015

Cork Harlequins

- Women's Irish Hockey League
  - Runners Up: 2017–18
- Irish Senior Cup
  - Runners Up: 2016–17
- EY Champions Trophy
  - Winners: 2024,2025

Railway Union

IRISH SENIOR CUP winner 2022 Catholic Institute

Winner 2024, 2025 Railway Union

Crescent College

- Munster Schools Senior Cup
  - Winners 2010, 2011
- Munster Schools Junior Cup
  - Winners: 2008, 2009
