= 2024 NCAA Division I field hockey tournament =

2024 NCAA Division I Field Hockey Championship

Tournament details
- Country: United States

Final positions
- Champions: Northwestern (2nd title)
- Runners-up: Saint Joseph's (1st title game)

Tournament statistics
- Matches played: 17

Awards
- Best player: Maddie Zimmer

The 2024 NCAA Division I Field Hockey Championship was the 44th annual tournament organized by the NCAA, to determine the national champion of Division I women's college field hockey in the United States.

The semi-finals and championship match were played at Phyllis Ocker Field at the University of Michigan in Ann Arbor, Michigan on November 22 and 24, 2024. Northwestern defeated Saint Joseph's 5-0 in the national championship game.

== Qualified teams ==
=== Automatic qualifiers ===
Conference	Champion	Record	Appearance	Last
America East	Vermont	11–8	1st	—
ACC	North Carolina	18-0	41st	2023
Atlantic 10	Saint Joseph's	17–3	7th	2022
Big East	UConn	17–3	33nd	2020
Big Ten	Michigan	15–4	20th	2022
CAA	Delaware	11–9	14th	2022
Ivy	Princeton	13–5	26th	2022
Mid-American	Miami (OH)	13–7	9th	2023
Northeast	Fairfield	12–8	6th	2021
Patriot	Lafayette	14–6	3rd	2012

=== At-large qualifiers ===
Team	Conference	Record	Appearance	Last
Boston College	ACC	14–6	13th	2019
Duke	ACC	12–6	12th	2023
Syracuse	ACC	13–6	18th	2023
Virginia	ACC	13–4	28th	2023
Massachusetts	Atlantic 10	15–5	27th	2022
Maryland	Big Ten	13–6	36th	2023
Northwestern	Big Ten	19–1	20th	2023
Harvard	Ivy	15–3	9th	2023

== Bracket ==
Opening round November 13, 2024; Campus sites
Delaware	2
Fairfield	1
Miami (OH)	2
Vermont	1

First round November 15, 2024; Campus sites
1	North Carolina*	4
Delaware	0
Maryland	0
Duke	1
Boston College	0
Princeton	1
Lafayette	0
4	Saint Joseph's*	1
3	UConn*	1
Massachusetts	2
Harvard	1
Syracuse	0
Virginia	2
Michigan	1
Miami (OH)	2
2	Northwestern*	9

Second round November 17, 2024; Campus sites
1	North Carolina	3
Duke	0
Princeton	0
4	Saint Joseph's	1
Massachusetts	1
Harvard	0
Virginia	2
2	Northwestern	3

Semifinals; November 22, 2024; Ann Arbor, Michigan; Phyllis Ocker Field
1	North Carolina	1
4	Saint Joseph's	2
Massachusetts	0
2	Northwestern	1

Championship; November 24, 2024; Ann Arbor, Michigan; Phyllis Ocker Field
4	Saint Joseph's	0
2	Northwestern	5

== See also ==
- NCAA Division II Field Hockey Championship
- NCAA Division III Field Hockey Championship
