= Sharon Pfluger =

American athletic coach (born 1960)

Current position
- Title: Head coach
- Team: TCNJ
- Conference: NJAC
- Record: 621–87–1 (lacrosse); 697–154–9 (field hockey)

Biographical details
- Born: November 16, 1960 (age 65); Pompton Lakes, New Jersey, U.S.
- Education: Trenton State College (B.S., 1982)

Coaching career (HC unless noted)

Field hockey
- 1982: Drew (assistant)
- 1983: Kean
- 1984: Montclair State
- 1985–present: Trenton State/TCNJ

Lacrosse
- 1984: Drew (assistant)
- 1986–present: Trenton State/TCNJ

Head coaching record
- Overall: 621–87–1 (.877) (lacrosse); 697–154–9 (.816) (field hockey)

Accomplishments and honors

Championships
- Field Hockey; 9 NCAA Division III (1985, 1988, 1990, 1991, 1995, 1996, 1999, 2011, 2014); 25x NJAC Tournament (1985–1997, 1999, 2001, 2004, 2006–2008, 2010, 2011, 2014, 2015, 2017, 2019); Lacrosse; 11* NCAA Division III (1987, 1988, 1991–1996, 2000, 2005, 2006); 16x NJAC Tournament (2009, 2011–2019, 2021–2026)

Records
- Most wins in women's college lacrosse (621)
- U.S. Lacrosse Hall of Fame; Inducted in 2007

Sharon Pfluger (née Goldbrenner; born November 16, 1960) is an American women's college lacrosse and field hockey coach for The College of New Jersey (TCNJ). With 621 wins, Pfluger is the NCAA career wins leader of women's lacrosse, and her 697 field hockey wins is the third-highest total of all time among NCAA field hockey coaches. She has amassed 19 (Note: Not including NCAA vacated 1992 Trenton State lacrosse title due to use of an ineligible player during the tournament.) Division III National Championships between the two sports. Before becoming the head coach for TCNJ, she was an assistant for both sports at Drew University, and the head field hockey coach for Kean University and Montclair State University.

== Early life ==
Raised in Pompton Lakes, New Jersey, she attended Pompton Lakes High School, where she competed in basketball, field hockey and softball.

Pfluger was a member of the 1981 Trenton State College field hockey team that won the inaugural NCAA Division III field hockey tournament. She graduated from Trenton State with a Bachelor of Science in 1982, majoring in health and physical education.

== Coaching career ==
Pfluger started her coaching career in 1982 at Drew University in Madison, New Jersey, assisting with field hockey. She then became the head field hockey coach at Kean in 1983, leading the school to a 4–8–3 record. In 1984, she became the head at Montclair State and led the field hockey team to a 5–11–1. That same year she would return to Drew to assist with the lacrosse.

In 1985 she returned to her alma mater, The College of New Jersey, then known as Trenton State College, to coach the field hockey team. The next year she was assigned to coach the lacrosse team as well. Under her lead, TCNJ has consistently been one of the best Division III programs for both lacrosse and field hockey. She has won the NCAA Division III women's lacrosse national championship 11 times with one being vacated, (1987, 1988, 1991, 1992*, 1993–1996, 2000, 2005, 2006). She has won the NCAA Division III field hockey national championship nine times, (1985, 1988, 1990, 1991, 1995, 1996, 1999, 2011, 2014).

In 2007, she was inducted into the National Lacrosse Hall of Fame

In the fall of 2022, Pfluger became the first coach in NCAA history to reach 1,200 career victories while coaching two different sports.

On April 23, 2025, she became the first women's lacrosse coach to reach 600 career wins

== Head coaching record ==
=== Lacrosse ===
Record table
Season	Team	Overall	Conference	Standing	Postseason
Trenton State/TCNJ Lions (NJAC) (1986–present)
1986	Trenton State	13–3–1			NCAA Division III runner-up
1987	Trenton State	16–2			NCAA Division III champion
1988	Trenton State	17–2			NCAA Division III champion
1989	Trenton State	17–1			NCAA Division III runner-up
1990	Trenton State	12–3			NCAA Division III semifinals
1991	Trenton State	16–1			NCAA Division III champion
1992	Trenton State	16–0			NCAA Division III champion (Note: NCAA vacated the 1992 Trenton State lacrosse title due to use of an ineligible player during the tournament.)
1993	Trenton State	15–0			NCAA Division III champion
1994	Trenton State	15–0			NCAA Division III champion
1995	Trenton State	17–0			NCAA Division III champion
1996	TCNJ	14–0			NCAA Division III champion
1997	TCNJ	14–1			NCAA Division III runner-up
1999	TCNJ	14–1			NCAA Division III semifinals
2000	TCNJ	17–0			NCAA Division III champion
2001	TCNJ	12–2			NCAA Division III semifinals
2002	TCNJ	17–1			NCAA Division III runner-up
2003	TCNJ	15–1			NCAA Division III semifinals
2004	TCNJ	18–1			NCAA Division III runner-up
2005	TCNJ	16–2			NCAA Division III champion
2006	TCNJ	15–2			NCAA Division III champion
2007	TCNJ	12–3			NCAA Division III quarterfinals
2008	TCNJ	17–2			NCAA Division III semifinals
2009	TCNJ	16–3	5–0	1st	NCAA Division III quarterfinals
2010	TCNJ	16–4	4–1	2nd	NCAA Division III quarterfinals
2011	TCNJ	20–1	5–0	1st	NCAA Division III semifinals
2012	TCNJ	16–4	5–0	1st	NCAA Division III quarterfinals
2013	TCNJ	15–5	5–0	1st	NCAA Division III quarterfinals
2014	TCNJ	19–2	6–0	1st	NCAA Division III quarterfinals
2015	TCNJ	18–4	6–0	1st	NCAA Division III quarterfinals
2016	TCNJ	20–2	6–0	1st	NCAA Division III regional
2017	TCNJ	19–2	6–0	1st	NCAA Division III runner-up
2018	TCNJ	20–3	6–0	1st	NCAA Division III semifinals
2019	TCNJ	14–6	6–0	1st	NCAA Division III regional
2020	TCNJ	4–0			Season ended due to COVID-19
2021	TCNJ	9–3	3–1	2nd	NCAA Division III quarterfinals
2022	TCNJ	18–3	6–0	1st	NCAA Division III semifinals
2023	TCNJ	16–4	5–0	T-2nd	NCAA Division III third round
2024	TCNJ	14–5	5–0	1st	NCAA Division III second round
2025	TCNJ	14–5	5–0	1st	NCAA Division III second round
2026	TCNJ	18–3	5–0	1st	NCAA Division III quarterfinals
Trenton State/TCNJ:		621–87–1 (.877)	91–2 (.978)		
Total:		621–87–1 (.877)			
National champion Postseason invitational champion Conference regular season champion Conference regular season and conference tournament champion Division regular season champion Division regular season and conference tournament champion Conference tournament champion

=== Field hockey ===
Record table
Season	Team	Overall	Conference	Standing	Postseason
Kean Cougars (NJSAC) (1983)
1983	Kean	4–8–3			
Kean:		4–8–3 (.367)			
Montclair State Indians (NJSAC) (1984)
1984	Montclair State	5–11–1			
Montclair State:		5–11–1 (.324)			
Trenton State/TCNJ Lions (NJAC) (1985–present)
1985	Trenton State	22–3	8–0	1st	NCAA Division III champion
1986	Trenton State	24–3	7–1	1st	NCAA Division III semifinals
1987	Trenton State	18–4	8–0	1st	NCAA Division III tournament
1988	Trenton State	21–0–2	8–0	1st	NCAA Division III champion
1989	Trenton State	21–1	8–0	1st	NCAA Division III runner-up
1990	Trenton State	18–0–1	7–0–1	1st	NCAA Division III champion
1991	Trenton State	19–0–1	8–0	1st	NCAA Division III champion
1992	Trenton State	18–2	8–0	1st	NCAA Division III runner-up
1993	Trenton State	18–1–1	8–0	1st	NCAA Division III semifinals
1994	Trenton State	19–1	8–0	1st	NCAA Division III runner-up
1995	Trenton State	20–0	8–0	1st	NCAA Division III champion
1996	TCNJ	21–1	7–1	1st	NCAA Division III champion
1997	TCNJ	16–3	8–0	1st	NCAA Division III regional
1998	TCNJ	14–4	6–2	3rd	NCAA Division III regional
1999	TCNJ	20–0	8–0	1st	NCAA Division III champion
2000	TCNJ	13–4	3–1	2nd	NCAA Division III regional
2001	TCNJ	13–4	3–1	T-1st	NCAA Division III semifinals
2002	TCNJ	13–3	3–1	2nd	NCAA Division III semifinals
2003	TCNJ	17–3	3–2	3rd	NCAA Division III semifinals
2004	TCNJ	14–6	5–1	1st	NCAA Division III regional
2005	TCNJ	15–5	4–2	T-2nd	NCAA Division III second round
2006	TCNJ	17–3	6–0	1st	NCAA Division III regional
2007	TCNJ	17–3	6–0	1st	NCAA Division III regional
2008	TCNJ	16–3	6–0	1st	NCAA Division III quarterfinals
2009	TCNJ	9–6	5–1	2nd	
2010	TCNJ	17–5	6–0	1st	NCAA Division III second round
2011	TCNJ	24–2	6–0	1st	NCAA Division III champion
2012	TCNJ	15–5	4–2	T-2nd	
2013	TCNJ	16–4	5–1	T-1st	
2014	TCNJ	23–1	6–0	1st	NCAA Division III champion
2015	TCNJ	20–2	6–0	1st	NCAA Division III semifinals
2016	TCNJ	16–4	6–0	1st	NCAA Division III second round
2017	TCNJ	17–4	5–1	T-1st	NCAA Division III semifinals
2018	TCNJ	16–5	4–2	3rd	NCAA Division III regional
2019	TCNJ	18–1	6–0	1st	NCAA Division III second round
2020	TCNJ				Season canceled due to COVID-19
2021	TCNJ	11–5	3–2	3rd	
2022	TCNJ	13–7	5–1	2nd	NCAA Division III second round
2023	TCNJ	11–8	3–2	T-2nd	
2024	TCNJ	13–7	5–1	2nd	
2025	TCNJ	13–6	5–1	2nd	
2026	TCNJ	12–6	6–1	2nd	
Trenton State/TCNJ:		688–135–5 (.834)	231–27–1 (.894)		
Total:		697–154–9 (.816)			
National champion Postseason invitational champion Conference regular season champion Conference regular season and conference tournament champion Division regular season champion Division regular season and conference tournament champion Conference tournament champion

== See also ==
- List of college women's lacrosse career coaching wins leaders
- List of college field hockey career coaching wins leaders
