= Garber Field =

Lacrosse stadium in Massachusetts, USA

Coordinates: 42.3865°N 72.5293°W

- Interactive map of Garber Field
- Full name: Richard F. Garber Field
- Former names: Upper Boyden Field
- Address: Amherst, Massachusetts; United States
- Owner: UMass
- Operator: UMass Athletics
- Capacity: 5,000
- Type: Stadium
- Current use: Lacrosse

Tenants
- UMass Minutemen (NCAA); men's and women's lacrosse

Website
- umassathletics.com/garber-field

Richard F. Garber Field is a lacrosse stadium in Amherst, Massachusetts. It is currently the home of the UMass Minutemen and UMass Minutewomen lacrosse teams. The field has also hosted games for the UMass field hockey team, men's soccer team and women's soccer team.

== History ==
Previously known as "Upper Boyden Field", the athletic field was renamed to Richard F. Garber Field in 1992. The field was rededicated at halftime of a 8-7 win over Yale on April 11, 1992.

Garber Field is named in honor of Richard F. Garber, the famed coach of the UMass men's lacrosse program from 1955 to 1990. At the time of his retirement, Garber was the winningest coach in college lacrosse history and had amassed 300 collegiate victories.

Several upgrades have been made to Garber Field over the years. In 1997, permanent lights were installed to allow for nighttime play. In 2006, there were playing surface, spectator stands, and press box upgrades. In 2015, a resurfacing project upgraded the playing surface. In 2020, a new video board was installed at the field.

In 2003, Garber Field was the host site for 2003 NCAA Division I field hockey tournament Final Four.
