= List of college women's lacrosse career coaching wins leaders =

This is a list of National Collegiate Athletic Association (NCAA) women's lacrosse head coaches by number of career wins. Head coaches with a combined career record of at least 275 wins at the Division I, Division II, Division III, or historically equivalent level are included here.

== Coaches ==
Statistics current as of the end of the 2026 season.

*	Active coach
†	National Lacrosse Hall of Fame inductee

Rank	Name	Years	Wins	Losses	Ties	Pct.	Teams
1*	Sharon Pfluger†	40	621	87	1	.877	Trenton State/TCNJ (1986–1997, 1999–present)
2*	Cindy Timchal†	44	613	169	0	.784	Northwestern (1982–1990), Maryland (1991–2006), Navy (2008–present)
3*	Jim Nestor	33	521	102	1	.836	Colby–Sawyer (1993–1994), Gannon (1996–2001), Salisbury (2002–present)
4	Carol Cantele	34	470	138	0	.773	Plymouth State (1988–92), Gettysburg (1993–2022)
5*	Jenny Levy†	31	462	132	0	.778	North Carolina (1996–present)
6*	Ginny Martino	29	441	89	0	.832	West Chester (1998–present)
7*	Amanda O'Leary†	31	437	132	0	.768	Yale (1994–2007), Florida (2010–present)
8	Chris Sailer†	35	433	168	0	.720	Princeton (1987–2022)
9	Missy Foote†	35	422	114	1	.787	Middlebury (1978–1983, 1987-–2015)
10*	Kelly Amonte Hiller†	25	408	97	0	.808	Northwestern (2002–present)
11*	Cathy Reese	23	394	86	0	.821	Denver (2004–2006), Maryland (2007–present)
12	Pat Genovese†	39	385	158	1	.709	William Smith (1972–73, 1976–2012)
13	Scott Tucker	26	375	89	0	.808	Oswego State (2000–2001), Limestone (2002–2025)
14*	Kerstin Kimel	32	373	214	0	.635	Davidson (1994), Duke (1996–present)
15*	Jackie Neary	30	370	176	0	.678	Cabrini (1997–2024), Neumann (2025–present)
16	Julie Meyers	27	348	174	0	.667	Virginia (1996–2023)
17*	Liza Kelly	25	346	124	0	.736	Boston University (2002–2006), Denver (2007–present)
18*	Karen Henning	26	333	114	0	.745	LIU Post (2000–2007), Colby (2008–present)
19	Susan Stuart	31	330	154	1	.681	Colorado College (1996–2025)
20*	Tracy Coyne	37	329	253	0	.565	Denison (1988–1989), Roanoke (1990–1996), Notre Dame (1997–2011), Washington & Jefferson (2013), George Washington (2015–2019), Saint Francis (PA) (2020–2024), Duquesne (2025–present)
21*	Kate Livesay	18	322	38	0	.894	Trinity (CT) (2007–2014), Middlebury (2016–present)
22	Christine Paradis	27	321	123	0	.723	Amherst (1995–2022)
23	Carol Rappoli	35	320	159	4	.667	Wellesley (1979–1980), Colgate (1981–1985), Tufts (1986–2013)
24*	Joe Spallina	19	316	50	0	.863	Adelphi (2008–2011), Stony Brook (2012–present)
25	Janine Tucker	29	313	180	0	.635	Johns Hopkins (1994–2022)
26*	Mike Faith	22	309	108	0	.741	Elizabethtown (2005–2012), Marshall (2012–2024), Millersville (2025), Stevenson (2026–present)
26*	Shelley Klaes	25	309	146	0	.679	Hofstra (2002–2006), James Madison (2007–present)
28*	Kara Reber	22	307	95	0	.764	Lycoming (2004–2008), St. Mary's (MD) (2009–2010), Florida Southern (2012–present)
29*	Anne Phillips	24	303	127	0	.705	Franklin & Marshall (2003–2008) Yale (2009–2015), William Smith (2016–present)
29*	Karen Borbee†	33	303	227	0	.572	Swarthmore (1993–present)
29	Chris Mason	33	303	171	0	.639	Williams (1981, 1985–2000, 2002–2017)
29*	Karin Corbett	29	302	170	0	.640	Drew (1995–1996), Penn (2000–present)
33*	Aimee Klepacki	27	298	180	0	.623	Western New England (2000–present)
34	Jan Hathorn	24	277	112	0	.712	Denison (1983–1987), Washington & Lee (1989–2007)
