= Chris DeBow =

American field hockey player

Medal record

Representing United States

Women's field hockey

Pan American Games
Silver medal – second place	Winnipeg 1999	Team

Christine ("Chris") DeBow (born October 19, 1976 in Media, Pennsylvania) is a former field hockey defender from the United States, who earned a total number of 53 caps for the Women's National Team. The former student of the University of Maryland, where she played for the Terrapins, earned the bronze medal at the 1997 Junior Pan American Championships. She is now currently coaching and is co owner and founder of the field hockey club the eliminators, which is a club based in southern maryland.

== International senior tournaments ==
- 1997 – Champions Trophy, Berlin, Germany (6th)
- 1998 – World Cup, Utrecht, The Netherlands (8th)
- 1999 – Pan American Games, Winnipeg, Canada (2nd)
- 2000 – Olympic Qualifying Tournament, Milton Keynes, England (6th)
