= George J. Sherman Family-Sports Complex =

AstroTurf field on the main campus of the University of Connecticut in Storrs

Coordinates: 41.80628°N 72.25702°W

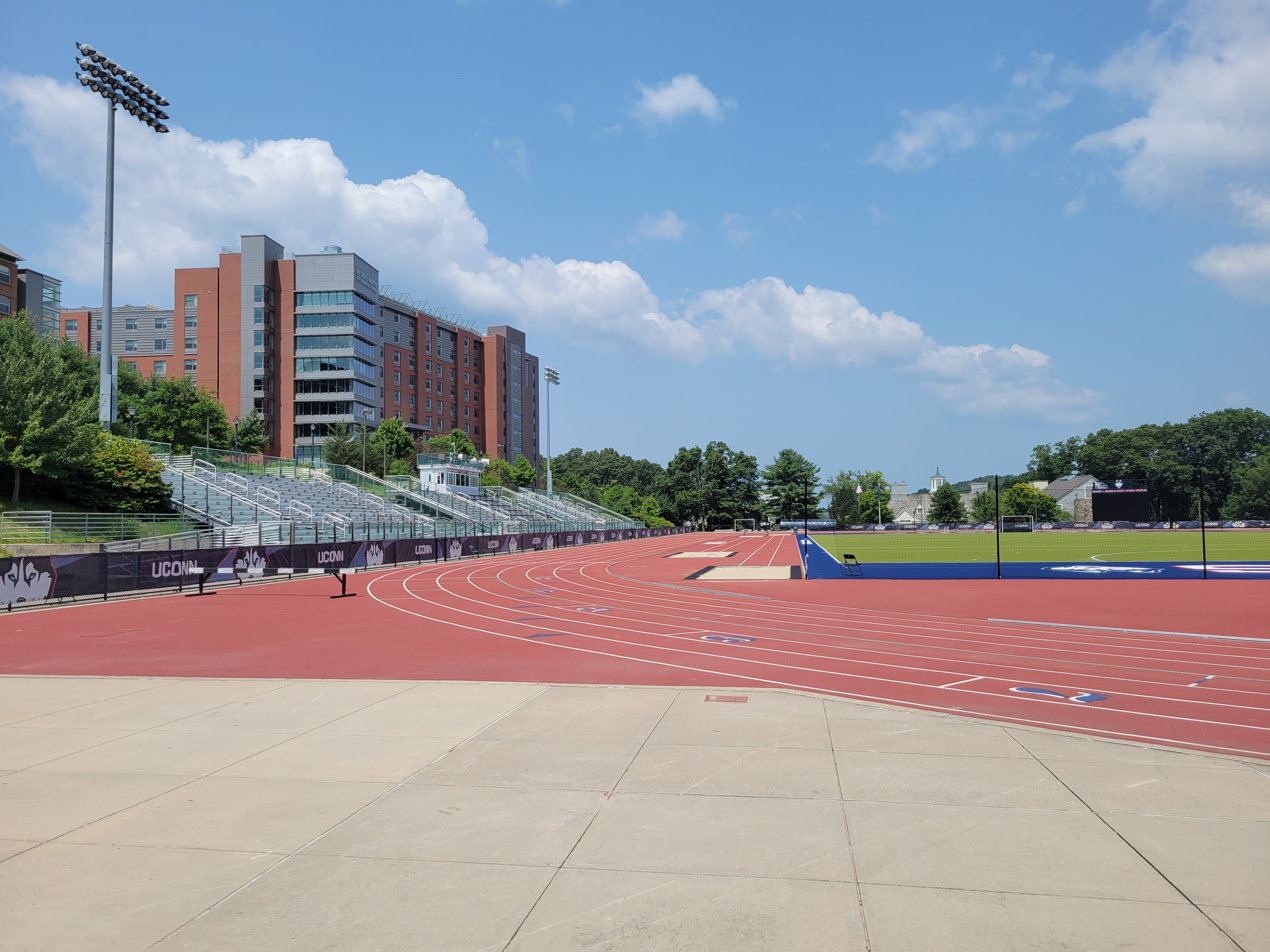
George J. Sherman Family-Sports Complex

The George J. Sherman Family Sports Complex is an AstroTurf field on the main campus of the University of Connecticut in Storrs, Connecticut. Its seating capacity is 2,000. It is home to the school's field hockey and lacrosse teams as well as the outdoor track program. It hosted the semifinals and final of the 1997 NCAA Division I Field Hockey Championship along with the 2022 NCAA Division I Field Hockey Championship. Sherman also has played host to the Big East Conference Field Hockey Tournament five times - 1996, 2000, 2008, 2010, and 2013. In 2015, it hosted the Big East women's lacrosse tournament for the first time.
