= University Hall Turf Field =

Stadium in Charlottesville, Virginia

- Interactive map of University Hall Turf Field
- Full name: University Hall Turf Field
- Location: Charlottesville, Virginia
- Coordinates: 38.04301°N 78.5081°W
- Owner: University of Virginia
- Operator: University of Virginia
- Capacity: 2,500
- Surface: AstroTurf

Tenant
- Virginia Cavaliers

University Hall Turf Field is a field hockey stadium in Charlottesville, Virginia. It is the home field of the University of Virginia Cavaliers field hockey program as well as acting as an alternate home for the men's and women's lacrosse teams when Klöckner Stadium is unavailable.

The Turf Field features a blue surface similar to the one used at the Riverbank Arena in London and was used by the United States women's national field hockey team prior to the 2012 Olympics for this reason.
