= J.S. Coyne Stadium =

Field-Hockey stadium in Syracuse, New York

- Interactive map of J.S. Coyne Stadium
- Location: Lampe Athletics Complex; Syracuse, New York, US
- Coordinates: 43.02421°N 76.12634°W
- Owner: Syracuse University
- Operator: Syracuse University
- Capacity: 2700
- Surface: AstroTurf
- Field size: 120 x 70 yards

Construction
- Opened: 1975

Tenants
- Syracuse Orange football (1975-1990); Syracuse Orange field hockey (NCAA) (1982-present)

J.S. Coyne Stadium is a field hockey stadium in Syracuse, New York, United States. It is the home field of the Syracuse University's women's field hockey program.

== History ==
J.S. Coyne Field, named after John Stanley Coyne who donated $600,000 for a synthetic field surface, was dedicated in July 1975 and was used as practice facility for the Syracuse Orange football. The team field hockey initially practiced in front of the Women's Building on an unkempt field with overgrown grass. Head coach Kathleen Parker fought the athletics department and the program began to practice on the grass fields by Coyne Stadium.

The stadium hosted the 2021 ACC Field Hockey Tournament.

== Field ==
A field hockey-specific AstroTurf was installed in 2005. After the Syracuse Orange field hockey won the 2015 national championship, the field was renovated in 2016 by GreenFields USA. The renovation made it a faster surface, similar to the field that was installed at the 2014 Hockey World Cup at the Kyocera Stadion in The Hague, Netherlands.
