= Marisa Didio =

American field hockey player and coach

Marisa Didio (born 1956) is a former United States women's national field hockey coach, having coached teams for U.S. Olympic Festivals in 1989, 1990 and 1991, and at Northwestern University and Yale University. She represented the United States as a player at national level in field hockey (1978-1980) and lacrosse (1978).

== Career ==
Marisa played field hockey throughout college under the guidance of the University of New Hampshire's coach Jean Rillings. Jean then invited her to be her assistant field hockey coach after Marisa graduated in 1978. The following year she moved to the University of Massachusetts as assistant coach to Pam Hixon, Head Lacrosse Coach. Later in 1979 she moved to Tufts University where she was hired as Head Coach for lacrosse and field hockey at the age of 22. She stayed at Tuffts until 1983 when Jean Rillings resigned from the University of New Hampshire and Marisa returned to coach their field hockey and lacrosse teams until 1988.

Under Didio's supervision the lacrosse and field hockey teams performed well in National Collegiate Athletic Association tournaments with many players representing both sports. In 1985 the UNH team won the National Lacrosse Championship and achieved second place in the NCAA field hockey championship in 1986 where they lost to the University of Iowa team under coach Judith Davidson.

Marisa's first Olympic experience was in 1988 when she left UNH to assist Dutch coach Baldwin Castling with the U.S. Olympic team. She returned briefly to UNH to focus solely on field hockey as both athletes and coaches began to specialise in single sports. In 1990, Marisa moved West to Northwestern University, Illinois, where she knew she would have the opportunity to compete in the NCAA's Big Ten Conference and where she stayed for four years until 1994. During this time she was voted the Big Ten Coach of the Year.

In 1996 she was again involved with the national Olympic team as well as coaching the U.S. Field Hockey Association development camps. She was hired as a consultant to review Yale University's programme, and in 1997 she was hired to implement the changes she recommended. This brought some success, with the team winning eight games in her first year and in 1998 the Yale women's field hockey team won the Eastern College Athletic Conference.

== Coaching philosophy ==
Athletic scholarships are not offered at Yale, and Marisa feels this allows athletes to play because they want to. She has described herself as a "70s kind of coach " and Marisa asks athletes to write and share a written statement about their ambition as a way to:

have athletes progressively define who they are, what they represent, and what they want to represent. What they want to accomplish and how they are going to make that happen!

== Personal life ==
Marisa spent her childhood in Lynnfield, Massachusetts. Her father John Didio was President of Candy Co. and owner of the New England Oyster House, and her mother Jacqueline (née Williams) raised Marisa and her two older brothers Keneth Burnham and John Didio, Jr. As a child she swam for an Amateur Athletic Union team and competed in field hockey and softball. She achieved a Bachelor of Science in Physical Education from the University of New Hampshire's College of Health Studies in 1978.
