= American Eagles field hockey =

College field hockey team

- Founded: 1964
- University: American University
- Head coach: Steve Jennings (28th season)
- Stadium: Jacobs Recreational Complex
- Location: Washington, D.C.
- Conference: Patriot League
- Nickname: Eagles
- Colors: Blue, white, and red

NCAA Tournament Quarterfinals
- 2004, 2005

NCAA Tournament appearances
- 2003, 2004, 2005, 2006, 2007, 2008, 2009, 2010, 2013, 2016, 2019, 2021, 2023

Conference Tournament championships
- 2003, 2004, 2005, 2006, 2007, 2008, 2009, 2010, 2013, 2016, 2019, 2021, 2023

Conference regular season championships
- 2003, 2004, 2005, 2006, 2007, 2008, 2009, 2010, 2011, 2013, 2019, 2020, 2021, 2023

5

American Eagles field hockey team is who represents American University and the program plays their home games at Jacobs Recreational Complex in Washington, D.C. It competes as part of the Patriot League in NCAA Division I. The Eagles are coached by Steve Jennings.

== History ==
The field hockey program began play in 1964, finishing with a 5-1-2 record under head coach Virginia Hawke.

American joined the CAA in 1985 and later the Patriot League in 2001.

After the hiring of Steve Jennings for the 1999 season, the Eagles experienced its first major success. From 2003 to present the Eagles have made 13 NCAA tournament appearances and won 13 conference tournament titles.

American has only won NCAA tournament games two times. The Eagles defeated Iowa 2–1 at the 2004 NCAA Division I field hockey tournament, advancing to the Elite 8 before losing to Maryland 2–0 in the national quarterfinal. The 2004 win over Iowa was the program's first-ever NCAA tournament win. The Eagles also won a game at the 2005 NCAA Division I field hockey tournament, beating Penn State 3–2 before advancing to the Elite 8 and again falling to Maryland in a 3–0 loss.

== See also ==
- List of NCAA Division I field hockey programs
