= Steve Jennings (field hockey) =

American field hockey player (born 1969)

Medal record

Representing United States

Men's field hockey

Pan American Games
Bronze medal – third place	Mar del Plata 1995	Team competition

Steven Michael Jennings (born July 24, 1969, in Bethesda, Maryland) is a former field hockey midfielder, who competed for the United States since 1991 and finished twelfth with the national team at the 1996 Summer Olympics in Atlanta, Georgia. He is currently field hockey head coach at the American University in Washington DC for over 26 seasons.
