= Northwestern Wildcats field hockey =

Athletic team of Northwestern University

- Founded: 1975; 51 years ago (varsity since 1980)
- University: Northwestern University
- Head coach: Tracey Fuchs (18th season season)
- Conference: Big Ten Conference
- Location: Evanston, Illinois
- Stadium: Lakeside Field (capacity: 300)
- Nickname: Wildcats
- Colors: Purple and white

NCAA tournament championships
- 2021, 2024, 2025, 2026

NCAA tournament runner-up
- 2022, 2023

NCAA tournament Semifinals
- 1983, 1985, 1989, 1994, 2021, 2022, 2023, 2024, 2025, 2026

NCAA tournament appearances
- 1983, 1984, 1985, 1986, 1987, 1988, 1989, 1990, 1991, 1993, 1994, 2014, 2017, 2019, 2020, 2021, 2022, 2023, 2024, 2025, 2026

Conference tournament championships
- 2014, 2023, 2025, 2026

Conference regular season championships
- 1983, 1984, 1985, 1988, 1994, 2013, 2023, 2024, 2025, 2026

The Northwestern Wildcats field hockey team is the intercollegiate field hockey program that is representing Northwestern University. The school competes in the Big Ten Conference in Division I of the National Collegiate Athletic Association (NCAA). The Northwestern field hockey team plays its home games at Lakeside Field on the university campus in Evanston, Illinois. The Wildcats have won ten regular-season conference titles, four conference tournament championships, and have appeared in the NCAA tournament 21 times, advancing to the Final Four on ten occasions. In 2021, the Wildcats won their first NCAA tournament. After a pair of losses in the national championship in 2022 and 2023, the Wildcats won back-to-back-to-back NCAA tournaments in 2024, 2025, and 2026. The team is currently coached by Tracey Fuchs.

== History ==
Field hockey has been a varsity sport at Northwestern University since 1980, although the school has fielded intercollegiate teams since 1974. From 1981 to 1988 and then again since 1992, the Wildcats have played in the Big Ten Conference. Between 1989 and 1991, Northwestern was a member of the Midwestern Collegiate Field Hockey Conference (MCFHC). The university also considers its 1977 and 1978 teams to have competed in the Big Ten, although field hockey was not a varsity sport at Northwestern for either of these seasons. As a Big Ten member, the Wildcats have won six regular-season conference titles as well as one conference tournament championship. Four of these Big Ten regular-season titles were won under the guidance of head coach Nancy Stevens, who lead the team from 1981 to 1989. Northwestern qualified for the NCAA tournament every year between 1983 and 1994 except for 1992, and it has reached the Final Four on four occasions. The Wildcats are currently coached by Tracey Fuchs. Prior to her tenure, Northwestern has been coached by Mary Ann Kelling (1975), Mary DiStanislao (1976–78), Sharon Drysdale (1979–80), Stevens (1981–89), Marisa Didio (1990–94 and 2000–03), Debra Brickey (1995–97), Diane Loosbrock (1998–99), and Kelly McCollum (2004–08).

=== Season-by-season results ===
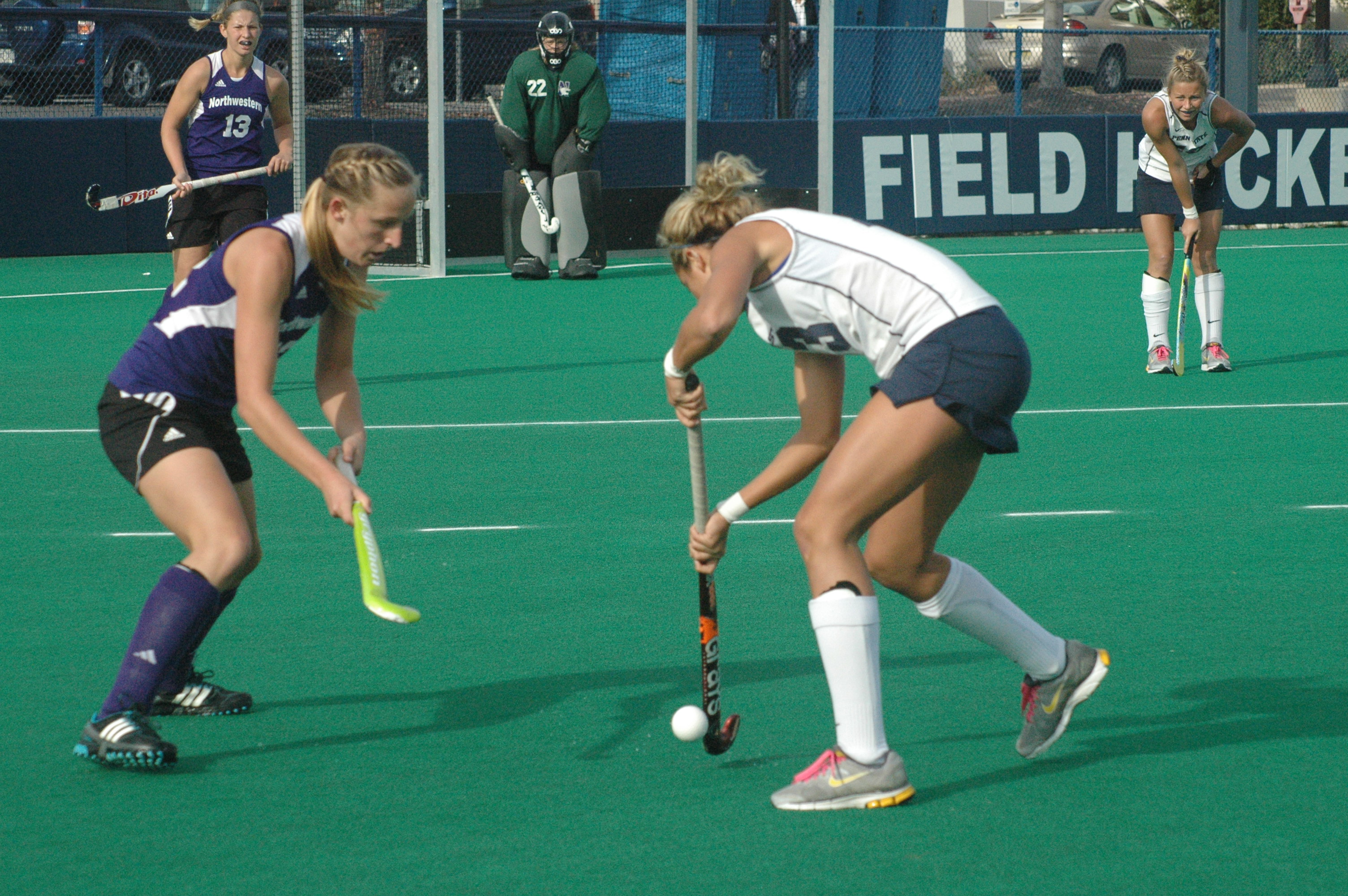
The 2011 Northwestern field hockey team in action at Penn State during the Big Ten Field Hockey Tournament

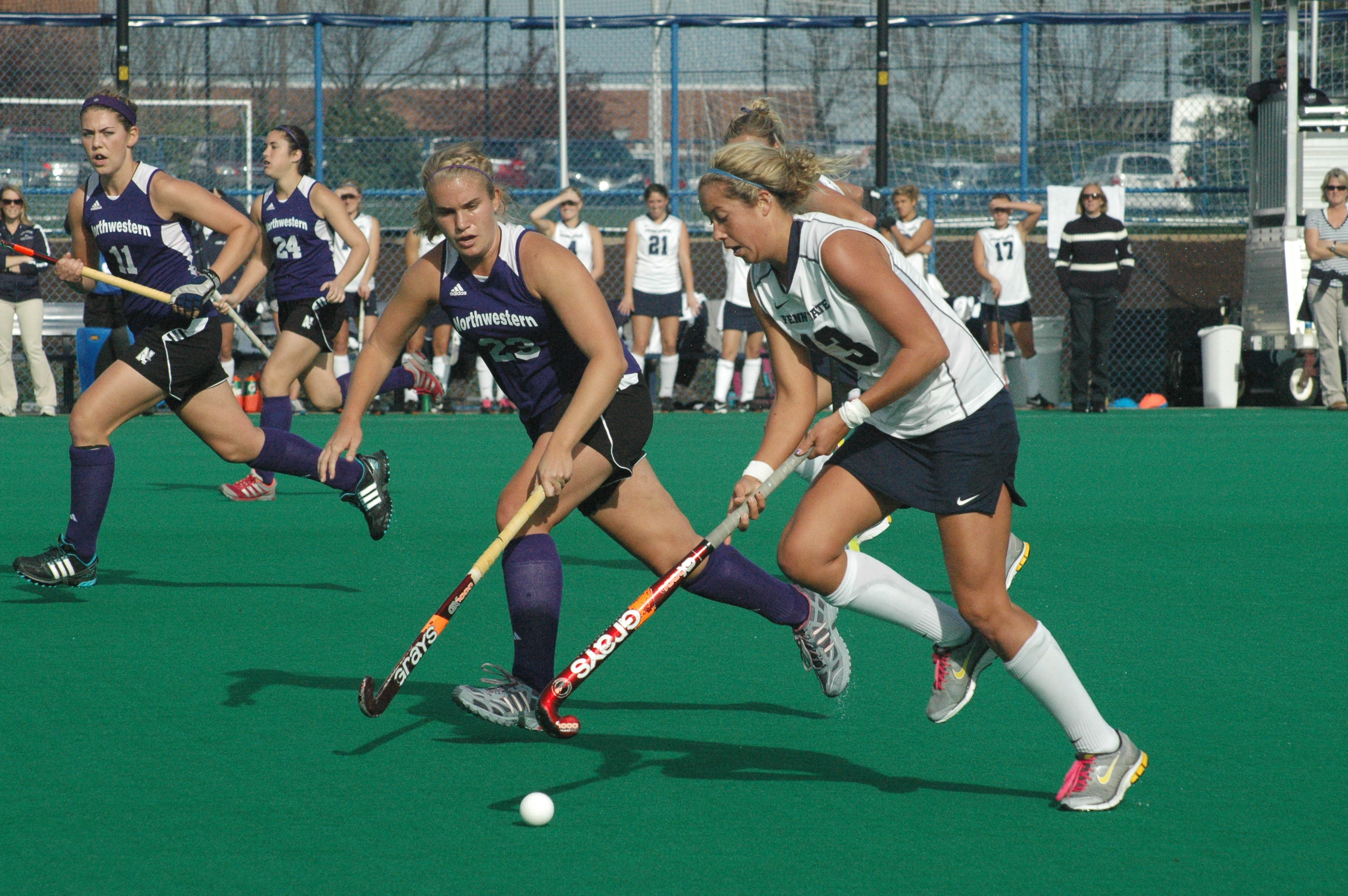

Year	Head coach	Overall	Pct.	Conf.	Pct.	Conf. Place	Conf. Tourn.	Postseason
1975	Mary Ann Kelling	5–3–1	.611	–	–	–	–	–
1976	Mary DiStanislao	6–2–3	.682	–	–	–	–	–
1977	Mary DiStanislao	8–7–2	.529	1–4	.200	–	–	–
1978	Mary DiStanislao	13–5–1	.711	1–2	.333	–	–	–
1979	Sharon Drysdale	8–10–1	.447	–	–	–	–	–
1980	Sharon Drysdale	18–6–3	.722	–	–	–	–	–
1981	Nancy Stevens	14–5–4	.696	7–2	.778	–	3rd	–
1982	Nancy Stevens	17–5	.773	4–1	.800	2nd	–	–
1983	Nancy Stevens	20–5	.800	9–1	.900	T1st	–	NCAA Final Four
1984	Nancy Stevens	17–2–1	.875	9–0–1	.950	1st	–	NCAA 1st Round
1985	Nancy Stevens	20–2	.909	9–1	.900	T1st	–	NCAA Final Four
1986	Nancy Stevens	15–4–2	.762	6–2–2	.700	2nd	–	NCAA 2nd Round
1987	Nancy Stevens	14–6–3	.674	6–2–2	.700	2nd	–	NCAA 2nd Round
1988	Nancy Stevens	17–2–1	.875	8–0	1.000	1st	–	NCAA 1st Round
1989	Nancy Stevens	18–4–1	.804	8–1–1	.850	–	–	NCAA Final Four
1990	Marisa Didio	15–3–1	.816	7–1	.875	–	–	NCAA 1st Round
1991	Marisa Didio	12–7–1	.625	5–3	.625	–	–	NCAA 1st Round
1992	Marisa Didio	6–11	.353	3–7	.300	T4th	–	–
1993	Marisa Didio	12–6–1	.658	6–4	.600	3rd	–	NCAA 2nd Round
1994	Marisa Didio	15–4–2	.762	8–1–1	.850	1st	2nd	NCAA Final Four
1995	Debra Brickey	13–6	.684	6–4	.600	T2nd	T3rd	–
1996	Debra Brickey	9–12	.429	3–7	.300	T4th	T3rd	–
1997	Debra Brickey	7–13	.350	3–7	.300	T5th	T5th	–
1998	Diane Loosbrock	7–13	.350	2–8	.200	6th	T5th	–
1999	Diane Loosbrock	4–14	.222	0–10	.000	6th	T5th	–
2000	Marisa Didio	6–13	.316	2–4	.333	T5th	T5th	–
2001	Marisa Didio	2–13	.133	1–5	.167	6th	T5th	–
2002	Marisa Didio	6–13	.316	1–5	.167	6th	T5th	–
2003	Marisa Didio	9–9	.500	1–5	.167	6th	T5th	–
2004	Kelly McCollum	7–13	.350	1–5	.167	T5th	T5th	–
2005	Kelly McCollum	7–11	.389	0–6	.000	6th	T5th	–
2006	Kelly McCollum	7–12	.368	1–5	.167	6th	T5th	–
2007	Kelly McCollum	4–14	.222	0–6	.000	7th	T5th	–
2008	Kelly McCollum	7–13	.350	1–5	.167	6th	T5th	–
2009	Tracey Fuchs	12–8	.600	1–5	.167	6th	T5th	–
2010	Tracey Fuchs	11–9	.550	3–3	.500	T4th	T5th	–
2011	Tracey Fuchs	12–9	.571	1–5	.167	T6th	T5th	–
2012	Tracey Fuchs	16–4	.800	4–2	.667	T2nd	T5th	–
2013	Tracey Fuchs	15–5	.750	5–1	.833	T1st	T5th	–
2014	Tracey Fuchs	16–7	.696	6–2	.750	T2nd	1st	NCAA 1st Round
2015	Tracey Fuchs	13–8	.619	4–4	.500	T4th	T3rd	–
2016	Tracey Fuchs	13–8	.619	5–3	.625	T3rd	T3rd	–
2017	Tracey Fuchs	15–7	.682	6–2	.750	T2nd	T3rd	NCAA 2nd Round
2018	Tracey Fuchs	9–10	.474	3–5	.375	7th	T5th	–
2019	Tracey Fuchs	14–7	.667	5–3	.625	4th	T5th	NCAA 1st Round
2020	Tracey Fuchs	12-6	.667	5-3	.625	T3rd	T4th	NCAA 2nd Round
2021	Tracey Fuchs	18-5	.783	5-3	.625	5th	T5th	NCAA Champions
2022	Tracey Fuchs	20-5	.800	5-3	.625	3rd	2nd	NCAA Runner-Up
2023	Tracey Fuchs	21-2	.913	8-0	1.000	1st	1st	NCAA Runner-Up
2024	Tracey Fuchs	23-1	.958	8-0	1.000	1st	2nd	NCAA Champions
2025	Tracey Fuchs	22-1	.957	8-0	1.000	1st	1st	NCAA Champions

Season-by-season results through the end of the 2025 season

== Awards and accolades ==
=== Conference championships ===
Northwestern has won nine conference titles, all in the Big Ten Conference. Four of their championships were won during the tenure of head coach Nancy Stevens in the 1980s.

Year	Coach	Conference Record	Overall Record	Conference	NCAA Result
1983	Nancy Stevens	9–1	20–5	Big Ten	NCAA Final Four
1984	Nancy Stevens	9–0–1	17–2–1	Big Ten	NCAA 1st Round
1985	Nancy Stevens	9–1	20–2	Big Ten	NCAA Final Four
1988	Nancy Stevens	8–0	17–2–1	Big Ten	NCAA 1st Round
1994	Marisa Didio	8–1–1	15–4–2	Big Ten	NCAA Final Four
2013	Tracey Fuchs	5–1	15–5	Big Ten	–
2023	Tracey Fuchs	8-0	21–2	Big Ten	NCAA Runner-Up
2024	Tracey Fuchs	8-0	23–1	Big Ten	NCAA Champions
2025	Tracey Fuchs	8-0	22–1	Big Ten	NCAA Champions
9 Conference Championships; 9 Big Ten Championships

=== Honda Sports Award winners ===
Year	Player
1986	Jennifer Averill
1994	Gretchen Scheuermann
2024	Maddie Zimmer
2025	Maddie Zimmer

=== All-Americans ===
Key
First-team selection	Second-team selection	Third-team selection

Season	Player
1982	Kathleen Kochmansky
1983	Jennifer Averill
1983	Kathleen Kochmansky
1984	Kathleen Kochmansky
1985	Robin Clark
1985	Amy Kekeisen
1986	Jennifer Averill
1989	Antoinette Lucas
1989	Kim Metcalf
1990	Natalie Beckerman
1990	Kathy Halley
1990	Antoinette Lucas
1990	Tami Neuhause
1990	Colleen Senich
1991	Kathy Halley
1991	Colleen Senich
1991	Kathleen Sullivan
1992	Kathy Halley
1992	Amy Vail
1993	Gretchen Scheuermann
1993	Shannon Small
1994	Donna Barg

Season	Player
1994	Amy Borneman
1994	Gretchen Scheuermann
1994	Betsy Vance
1995	Amy Borneman
1995	Linda Formosi
1995	Betsy Vance
1996	Ellie Karvoski
2004	Candice Cooper
2010	Chelsea Armstrong
2011	Chelsea Armstrong
2012	Chelsea Armstrong
2012	Tara Puffenberger
2013	Nikki Parsley
2013	Tara Puffenberger
2014	Lisa McCarthy
2015	Lisa McCarthy
2016	Isabel Flens
2017	Sophia Miller
2017	Puck Pentenga
2019	Bente Baekers
2020	Bente Baekers
2020	Kayla Blas

Season	Player
2020	Maddie Zimmer
2021	Bente Baekers
2021	Maddie Zimmer
2022	Bente Baekers
2022	Maddie Zimmer
2022	Kayla Blas
2023	Annabel Skubisz
2023	Lauren Wadas
2023	Olivia Bent-Cole
2023	Peyton Halsey
2023	Alia Marshall
2024	Ashley Sessa
2024	Annabel Skubisz
2024	Lauren Wadas
2024	Maddie Zimmer
2024	Ilse Tromp
2025	Ashley Sessa
2025	Ilse Tromp
2025	Maddie Zimmer
2025	Juliana Boon
2025	Olivia Bent-Cole

=== Olympians ===
Olympics	Player	Country
1996	Antoinette Lucas	United States
2024	Ashley Sessa	United States
2024	Maddie Zimmer	United States

Awards and accolades through the end of the 2024 season

== Stadium ==
Northwestern has played its home games at Lakeside Field since its construction in 1997. Located on the shore of Lake Michigan, the field is part of the university's $3.5-million Leonard B. Thomas Athletic Complex on the north end of its main campus in Evanston. Lakeside Field features an AstroTurf playing field that was installed in 2015 and a seating capacity of 300, as well as a permanent scoreboard, a sound system, and lighting that allows for the playing of night games. The venue has hosted the Big Ten Field Hockey Tournament three times, in 2002, 2004, 2018. Lakeside Field is located adjacent to Lenny and Sharon Martin Stadium, previously also known as Lakeside Field, which is home to Northwestern's women's lacrosse, men's soccer, and women's soccer teams.

== See also ==
- List of NCAA Division I field hockey programs
