= Syracuse Orange field hockey =

Field hockey team of Syracuse University

- University: Syracuse University
- Conference: Atlantic Coast Conference
- Head coach: Lynn Farquhar
- Field: Capacity: 2,700, AstroTurf
- Location: Syracuse, New York
- Colors: Orange

NCAA Tournament championships
- 2015

NCAA Tournament Runner-up
- 1984 (AIAW), 2014

NCAA Tournament appearances
- 1993, 1995, 2001, 2008, 2009, 2010, 2011, 2012, 2013, 2014, 2015, 2016, 2017, 2019, 2021, 2022, 2023, 2024, 2025, 2026

Conference Tournament championships
- Big East: 1993, 1995, 2001, 2008, 2010, 2011

Conference regular season championships
- Big East: 1993, 1994, 1995, 2001, 2008, 2009, 2010, 2012; ACC: 2015

The Syracuse Orange field hockey team is the intercollegiate field hockey program representing Syracuse University. The school competes in the Atlantic Coast Conference of NCAA Division I field hockey.

The team plays its home games at the J.S. Coyne Stadium on the university campus in Syracuse, New York. Syracuse has won one NCAA Championship as well as 9 conference regular season titles and 6 conference tournaments since the creation of the field hockey program in 1972. Lynn Farquhar was named the head coach in 2022, taking over from long-time head coach Ange Bradley who retired after coaching for 14 seasons with the Orange.

== History ==
The field hockey team played its first season in 1971-72 and had a record of 1-3-1. Syracuse played its first game against Potsdam, losing 0-4. The team began competing in Division-I in 1982. In 2008, the team was ranked No. 1, capturing the top spot in the polls for the first time in Syracuse history.

== Head coaches ==
In nearly 50 years of the programs existence, only four coaches have coached the team. The first head coach Muriel K. Smith served as the head coach for both the field hockey and women’s basketball head coach for six seasons. She led the field hockey team to a 22-16-7 record from 1972-1977.

Kathleen Parker served as the head coach for 28 seasons from 1978 until 2006. She was named the Big East coach of the year in 1993, 1994, 1995, 2001. Parker led the team to a 316-214-14 record and 20 winning seasons. She was named to the NFHCA Hall of Fame in 2006.

Ange Bradley was hired by Athletic director Daryl Gross in 2006. The team was soon ranked No. 1 in October 2008, holding the top spot in the polls for the first time in Syracuse history. As of 2021, the program made 11 NCAA Tournament appearances in her 14 year of coaching at Syracuse. Bradley is a five-time conference Coach of the Year (ACC: 1; Big East: 4). She was named the Big East coach of the year in 2007, 2009, 2010, 2012 and the ACC Coach of the Year in 2015 after winning the national championship. Bradley was also named the NFHCA National Coach of the Year in 2015.

Lynn Farquhar has been the head coach since the 2023 season.

== Wins and records ==
=== All-time record ===
As of 2025, the program has compiled an all-time record of 621-334-21. The program has won nine conference regular season championships, six league tournament championships. In 2016, The team recorded its 500th victory all-time with a 8-0 win against Temple.

=== NCAA appearances and 2015 National championship ===
Since 1972, Syracuse has accumulated a total of 19 appearances in the NCAA tournament. In 1993, Syracuse made their first NCAA Tournament appearance against Penn, winning 3-0.

In 1981, the Orange finished runner-up for the AIAW Division II National Championship, losing to Lock Haven in the championship game.

In 2015 the Orange won their first NCAA championship by defeating North Carolina in the final by a score of 4–2. The victory made them the first women's team at the university to win a national championship. This record-breaking squad had 21-1 record.

== Individual honors ==
As of 2023, Syracuse has produced two olympians, 11 U.S. National Team players, and 49 All-Americans, including eight three-time All-Americans.

- Olympians (2): Shannon Taylor (2012) and Alyssa Manley (2016) have played for the United States women's national field hockey team.
- National team players (11): Julie Williamson, (1993), Laura Fitzpatrick (1997), Audrey Latsko (2000), Michelle Marks (2000), Shannon Taylor (2010-12), Jordan Page (2012-13), Alyssa Manley (U19, 2012-13), Alyssa Manley (2015-16), Jess Jecko (2016), Laura Hurff (2015-16), Charlotte De Vries (2021-present).
- Honda Award: Alyssa Manley (2015)
- BIG East Player(s) of the Year: Julie Williamson (1994), Jodi Carter (1995), Kristin Aronowicz (2001), and Heather Susek (2011)
- All-Americans: 52 (total 61 selections) made up of 19 First-Team All-Americans, 19 Second-Team All-Americans, and 17 Third-Team All-Americans. Kelly Larkin (1991) was the first-ever All-Americans for the Orange.
  - Four-time All-American are Charlotte de Vries (2019, 20, 21, 22) and Eefke van den Nieuwenhof (2020, 21, 22, 23)
  - Three-time All-Americans are Julie Williamson (1992-94), Martina Loncarica (2008-10), Laura Hahnefeldt (2010, 2012/13), Alyssa Manley (2013-15), Laura Hurff (2015-17), Roos Weers (2016-18).
  - Two-time All-Americans are Heather Chase (1994, 95), Audrey Latsko (2000, 02), Lindsey Conrad (2008, 09), Heather Susek (2010, 11), Kelsey Millman (2011, 12), Emma Russell (2014, 15), Lies Lagerweij (2016, 17), Quirine Comans (2021, 22), and Bo van Kempen (2024, 2025).
- Total All-Conference selections: 140, of which 89 came from the Big East years and 51 from the ACC.

== Stadium ==
J.S. Coyne Stadium, named after J. Stanley Coyne who donated $600,000 for a synthetic field surface, was dedicated in 1975. The team initially practiced in front of the Women's Building on an unkempt field with overgrown grass. Head coach Kathleen Parker fought the athletics department and the program began to practice on the grass fields by J.S. Coyne Stadium.

A field hockey-specific AstroTurf was installed in 2005. The field was renovated in 2016. The team also use other practice facilities on the campus including the Carrier Dome and Manley Field House.

== Season-by-season results ==
Season-by-season results through the end of the 2025 season.

Year	Head coach	Overall	Pct.	Conf.	Pct.	Conf. tourn.	Conf. pct.	Postseason
1972	Muriel K. Smith (Independent)	1-3-1	.300	–	–	–	–	–
1973	Muriel K. Smith (Independent)	1-3-0	.250	–	–	–	–	–
1974	Muriel K. Smith (Independent)	2-2-2	.500	–	–	–	–	–
1975	Muriel K. Smith (Independent)	3-4-0	.429	–	–	–	–	–
1976	Muriel K. Smith (Independent)	8-2-2	.750	–	–	–	–	–
1977	Muriel K. Smith (Independent)	7-2-2	.727	–	–	–	–	–
	Muriel K. Smith	22-16-7	.567					
1978	Kathleen Parker (Independent & Big East)	6-6-1	.500	–	–	–	–	–
1979	Kathleen Parker (Independent & Big East)	5-9-0	.357	–	–	–	–	–
1980	Kathleen Parker (Independent & Big East)	9-8-0	.529	–	–	–	–	–
1981	Kathleen Parker (Independent & Big East)	18-5-0	.783	–	–	–	–	–
1982	Kathleen Parker (Independent & Big East)	10-5-0	.667	–	–	–	–	–
1983	Kathleen Parker (Independent & Big East)	6-9-0	.400	–	–	–	–	–
1984	Kathleen Parker (Independent & Big East)	7-9-0	.438	–	–	–	–	–
1985	Kathleen Parker (Independent & Big East)	10-6-1	.618	–	–	–	–	–
1986	Kathleen Parker (Independent & Big East)	11-5-2	.667	–	–	–	–	–
1987	Kathleen Parker (Independent & Big East)	7-12-1	.375	–	–	–	–	–
1988	Kathleen Parker (Independent & Big East)	9-8-2	.526	–	–	–	–	–
1989 *	Kathleen Parker (Independent & Big East)	12-7-0	.632	0-2-0	.000	0-1	.000	–
1990	Kathleen Parker (Independent & Big East)	17-3-0	.850	4-1-0	.800	0-1	.000	–
1991	Kathleen Parker (Independent & Big East)	12-4-1	.735	4-1-0	.800	0-1	.000	–
1992	Kathleen Parker (Independent & Big East)	12-7-2	.619	4-2-1	.643	1-1	.500	–
1993	Kathleen Parker (Independent & Big East)	17-4-1	.795	6-0-1	.929	2-0	1.00	1-1 (quarterfinals)
1994	Kathleen Parker (Independent & Big East)	11-5-3	.658	4-0-1	.900	1-1	.500	
1995	Kathleen Parker (Independent & Big East)	14-7-0	.667	4-1-0	.800	2-0	1.00	0-1 (first round)
1996	Kathleen Parker (Independent & Big East)	9-10-0	.474	3-2-0	.600	0-1	.000	
1997	Kathleen Parker (Independent & Big East)	13-8-0	.619	3-2-0	.600	0-1	.000	
1998	Kathleen Parker (Independent & Big East)	11-8-0	.579	3-2-0	.600	0-1	.000	
1999	Kathleen Parker (Independent & Big East)	13-8-0	.619	3-2-0	.600	1-1	.500	
2000	Kathleen Parker (Independent & Big East)	12-8-0	.600	2-3-0	.400	0-1	.000	
2001	Kathleen Parker (Independent & Big East)	16-4-0	.800	5-0-0	1.000	2-0	1.00	1-1 (quarterfinals)
2002	Kathleen Parker (Independent & Big East)	10-11-0	.476	2-3-0	.400	0-1	.000	
2003	Kathleen Parker (Independent & Big East)	7-11-0	.389	1-4-0	.200	–	–	
2004	Kathleen Parker (Independent & Big East)	11-9-0	.550	3-2-0	.600	0-1	.000	
2005	Kathleen Parker (Independent & Big East)	11-9-0	.550	3-2-0	.600	0-1	.000	
2006	Kathleen Parker (Independent & Big East)	10-9-0	.526	2-4-0	.333	–	–	
	Kathleen Parker	316-214-14	.594	56-33-3	.625	9-13	.409	2-3 (.400)
2007	Ange Bradley (Big East & Atlantic Coast Conference 2013 onwards)	12-7-0	.632	3-3-0	.500	0-1	.000	
2008	Ange Bradley (Big East & Atlantic Coast Conference 2013 onwards)	22-2-0	.917	5-1-0	.833	2-0	1.00	2-1 (semifinals)
2009	Ange Bradley (Big East & Atlantic Coast Conference 2013 onwards)	18-4-0	.818	6-0-0	1.000	1-1	.500	1-1 (quarterfinals)
2010	Ange Bradley (Big East & Atlantic Coast Conference 2013 onwards)	16-5-0	.762	6-0-0	1.000	2-0	1.00	1-1 (quarterfinals)
2011	Ange Bradley (Big East & Atlantic Coast Conference 2013 onwards)	19-4-0	.826	5-1-0	.833	2-0	1.00	1-1 (quarterfinals)
2012	Ange Bradley (Big East & Atlantic Coast Conference 2013 onwards)	19-3-0	.864	6-0-0	1.000	1-1	.500	2-1 (semifinals)
2013 †	Ange Bradley (Big East & Atlantic Coast Conference 2013 onwards)	16-4-0	.800	4-2-0	.667	1-1	.500	0-1 (first round)
2014	Ange Bradley (Big East & Atlantic Coast Conference 2013 onwards)	18-6-0	.750	2-4-0	.333	2-1	.667	3-1 (final)
2015	Ange Bradley (Big East & Atlantic Coast Conference 2013 onwards)	21-1-0	.955	6-0-0	1.000	1-1	.500	4-0 (national champions)
2016	Ange Bradley (Big East & Atlantic Coast Conference 2013 onwards)	15-4-0	.789	4-2-0	.667	1-0	1.00	1-1 (quarterfinals)
2017	Ange Bradley (Big East & Atlantic Coast Conference 2013 onwards)	12-7-0	.632	2-4-0	.333	0-1	.000	0-1 (first round)
2018	Ange Bradley (Big East & Atlantic Coast Conference 2013 onwards)	8-8-0	.500	1-5-0	.167	0-1	.000	–
2019	Ange Bradley (Big East & Atlantic Coast Conference 2013 onwards)	12-7-0	.632	3-3-0	.500	0-1	.000	0-1 (first round)
2020	Ange Bradley (Big East & Atlantic Coast Conference 2013 onwards)	8-8-0	.500	4-6-0	.400	1-1	.500	–
2021	Ange Bradley (Big East & Atlantic Coast Conference 2013 onwards)	14-6-0	.700	4-2-0	.667	1-1	.500	1-1 (quarterfinals)
2022	Ange Bradley (Big East & Atlantic Coast Conference 2013 onwards)	16-6-0	.727	3-3-0	.500	1-1	.500	1-1 (quarterfinals)
	Ange Bradley	246-82-0	.750	64-36-0	.640	16-12	.571	
2023	Lynn Farquhar (Atlantic Coast Conference)	11-8-0	.579	2-4-0	.333	1-1	.500	1-1 (quarterfinals)
2024	Lynn Farquhar (Atlantic Coast Conference)	13-7-0	.650	4-4-0	.500	1-1	.500	0-1 (first round)
2025	Lynn Farquhar (Atlantic Coast Conference)	13-7-0	.650	3-5-0	.375	1-1	.500	1-1 (quarterfinals)
Program Totals		621-334-21	.647	129-82-3	.610			21-17 .553 (19 appearances)

* began competing in the Big East.
† began competing in the ACC.

== See also ==
- List of NCAA Division I field hockey programs
