= Maryland Terrapins field hockey =

American college field hockey team

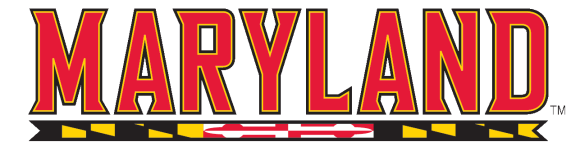
- Founded: 1974
- University: University of Maryland, College Park
- Head coach: Missy Meharg (38th season season)
- Conference: Big Ten
- Location: College Park, Maryland
- Stadium: Field Hockey & Lacrosse Complex (capacity: 2,000)
- Nickname: Terrapins
- Colors: Red, white, black, and gold

NCAA tournament championships
- 1987, 1993, 1999, 2005, 2006, 2008, 2010, 2011

NCAA tournament runner-up
- 1995, 2001, 2009, 2017, 2018, 2026

NCAA tournament Semifinals
- 1987, 1991, 1993, 1995, 1999, 2000, 2001, 2003, 2004, 2005, 2006, 2008, 2009, 2010, 2011, 2012, 2013, 2017, 2018, 2021, 2022, 2026

NCAA tournament appearances
- 1985, 1987, 1988, 1990, 1991, 1992, 1993, 1995, 1996, 1997, 1998, 1999, 2000, 2001, 2002, 2003, 2004, 2005, 2006, 2007, 2008, 2009, 2010, 2011, 2012, 2013, 2014, 2015, 2017, 2018, 2019, 2021, 2022, 2023, 2024, 2026

Conference tournament championships
- 1992, 1998, 1999, 2000, 2001, 2005, 2008, 2009, 2010, 2013, 2015, 2018

Conference regular season championships
- 2014, 2015, 2016, 2018, 2019, 2022, 2026

The Maryland Terrapins field hockey is the team that is the intercollegiate field hockey program who is representing the University of Maryland. The school currently competes in the Big Ten Conference in Division I of the National Collegiate Athletic Association (NCAA), although it was a member of the Atlantic Coast Conference (ACC) before 2014. The Maryland field hockey team plays its home games at the Field Hockey & Lacrosse Complex on the university campus in College Park, Maryland. The Terrapins are among the most accomplished field hockey programs in the country, and they have won a total of eight NCAA national championships and 16 conference championships (10 in the ACC and 6 in the Big Ten). The team is currently coached by Missy Meharg.

== History ==
Field hockey has been a varsity sport at the University of Maryland since 1974. Between 1983 and 2013, the Terrapins competed as a member of the Atlantic Coast Conference (ACC). Beginning with the 2014 season, however, Maryland (along with Rutgers) has joined the Big Ten Conference, expanding it to nine field hockey members. The Terrapins are among the most accomplished field hockey programs in the country, amassing 12 conference championships (all but two in the ACC), eight NCAA national championships, and a record 57 wins in the NCAA tournament. In the entire history of the field hockey program, Maryland has only had two head coaches: Sue Tyler (1974–87) and Missy Meharg (1988–present). The program has been particularly successful under Meharg, who has guided the Terrapins to seven national titles, nine ACC Tournament titles, and 15 NCAA Final Four appearances while collecting nine National Coach of the Year awards herself.

=== Season-by-season results ===
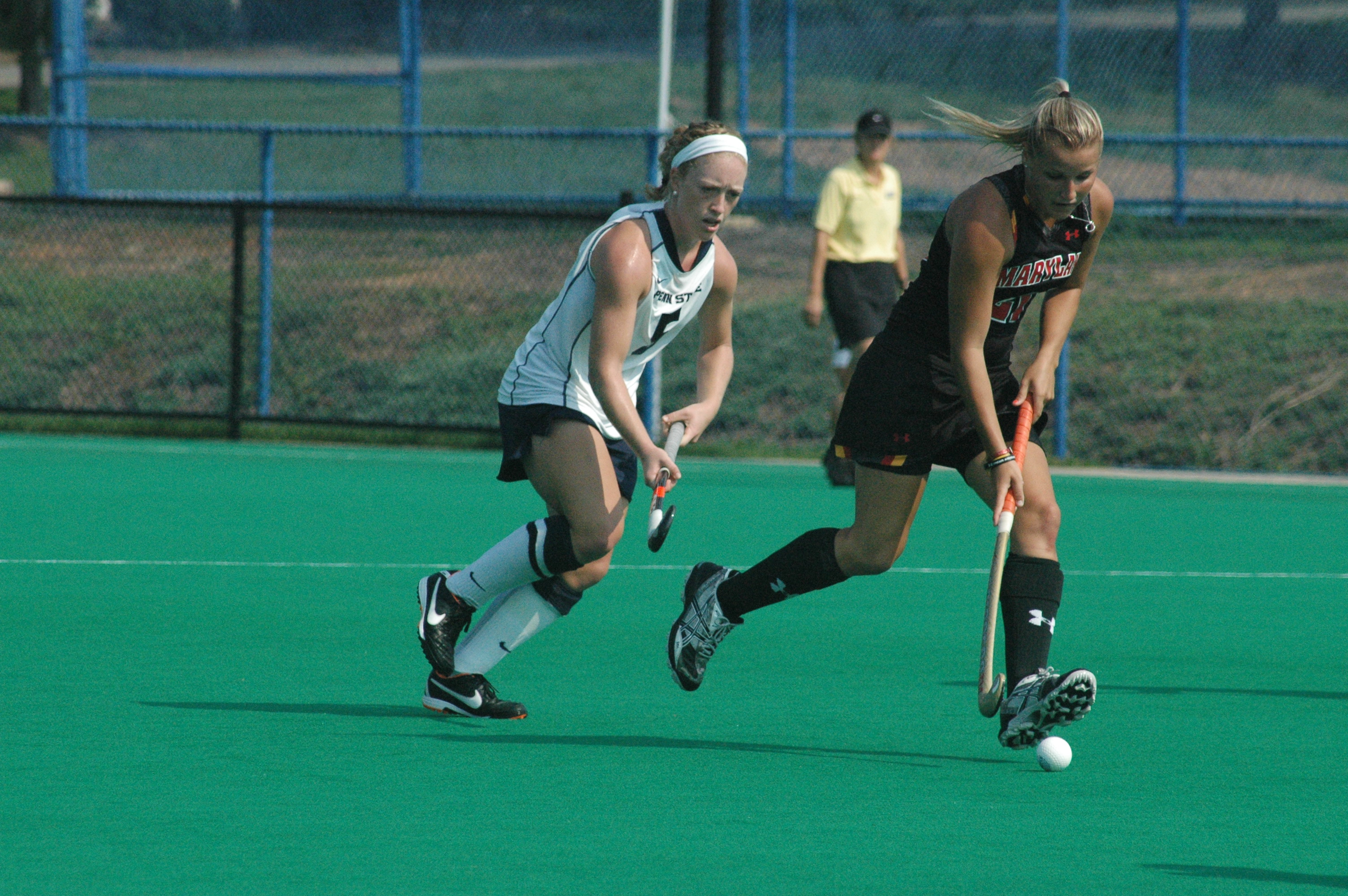
The 2011 Maryland field hockey team in action at Penn State

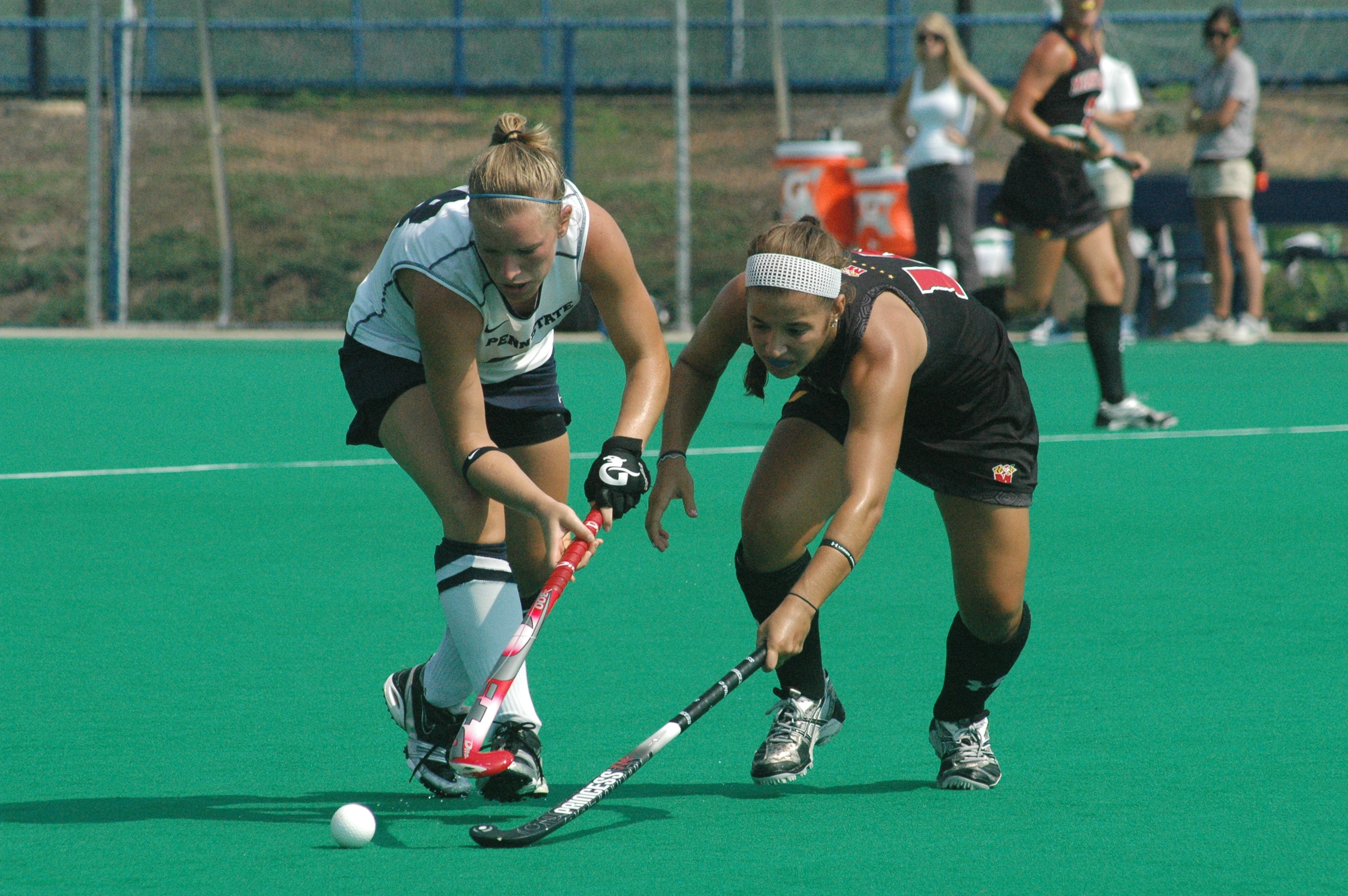

Year	Head coach	Overall	Pct.	Conf.	Pct.	Conf. Place	Conf. Tourn.	Postseason
1974	Sue Tyler	11–3–4	.722	–	–	–	–	–
1975	Sue Tyler	12–5	.706	–	–	–	–	–
1976	Sue Tyler	6–7	.462	–	–	–	–	–
1977	Sue Tyler	7–6–3	.531	–	–	–	–	–
1978	Sue Tyler	7–5–2	.571	–	–	–	–	–
1979	Sue Tyler	15–4–4	.739	–	–	–	–	AIAW semifinals
1980	Sue Tyler	9–5–3	.618	–	–	–	–	–
1981	Sue Tyler	6–8–2	.438	–	–	–	–	–
1982	Sue Tyler	13–8	.619	–	–	–	–	–
1983	Sue Tyler	12–6–2	.650	0–1	.000	–	2nd	–
1984	Sue Tyler	15–7–1	.674	1–0	1.000	–	T3rd	–
1985	Sue Tyler	14–7–3	.646	1–1–1	.500	–	T3rd	NCAA 2nd Round
1986	Sue Tyler	9–10–2	.476	1–1–1	.500	–	2nd	–
1987	Sue Tyler	18–4–1	.804	2–1	.667	–	2nd	NCAA Champions
1988	Missy Meharg	11–9–2	.545	1–1–1	.500	–	2nd	NCAA 1st Round
1989	Missy Meharg	11–8–1	.575	1–2	.333	–	2nd	–
1990	Missy Meharg	11–6–2	.632	1–2	.333	–	T3rd	NCAA 1st Round
1991	Missy Meharg	17–5–1	.761	2–0–1	.833	–	2nd	NCAA Final Four
1992	Missy Meharg	15–5–1	.738	2–2	.500	–	1st	NCAA 2nd Round
1993	Missy Meharg	21–3	.875	4–0	1.000	–	2nd	NCAA Champions
1994	Missy Meharg	10–9–2	.524	3–4–1	.438	–	2nd	–
1995	Missy Meharg	19–5	.792	6–2	.750	–	2nd	NCAA Runner-Up
1996	Missy Meharg	15–7	.682	3–5	.375	–	2nd	NCAA 2nd Round
1997	Missy Meharg	18–4	.818	2–2	.500	–	T3rd	NCAA 2nd Round
1998	Missy Meharg	16–6	.727	3–1	.750	–	1st	NCAA 2nd Round
1999	Missy Meharg	24–1	.960	4–0	1.000	–	1st	NCAA Champions
2000	Missy Meharg	19–4	.826	2–2	.500	–	1st	NCAA Final Four
2001	Missy Meharg	20–4	.833	3–1	.750	–	1st	NCAA Runner-Up
2002	Missy Meharg	17–5	.773	2–2	.500	–	2nd	NCAA 2nd Round
2003	Missy Meharg	20–4	.833	2–2	.500	–	T3rd	NCAA Final Four
2004	Missy Meharg	17–6	.739	2–2	.500	–	2nd	NCAA Final Four
2005	Missy Meharg	23–2	.920	4–1	.800	–	1st	NCAA Champions
2006	Missy Meharg	23–2	.920	4–1	.800	–	2nd	NCAA Champions
2007	Missy Meharg	18–3	.857	4–1	.800	–	T3rd	NCAA 2nd Round
2008	Missy Meharg	22–2	.917	4–1	.800	–	1st	NCAA Champions
2009	Missy Meharg	23–1	.958	5–0	1.000	–	1st	NCAA Runner-Up
2010	Missy Meharg	23–1	.958	5–0	1.000	–	1st	NCAA Champions
2011	Missy Meharg	19–4	.826	4–1	.800	–	T3rd	NCAA Champions
2012	Missy Meharg	18–6	.750	3–2	.600	–	2nd	NCAA Final Four
2013	Missy Meharg	22–2	.917	6–0	1.000	–	1st	NCAA Final Four
2014	Missy Meharg	19–4	.826	7–1	.875	1st	2nd	NCAA 2nd Round
2015	Missy Meharg	19-4	.826	8-0	1.000	1st	1st	NCAA 1st Round
2016	Missy Meharg	19-4	.783	7-1	.875	1st	2nd	NCAA 2nd Round
2017	Missy Meharg	16-7	.696	6-2	.750	T-2nd	3rd	NCAA Runner-Up
2018	Missy Meharg	22-3	.880	7-1	.875	T-1st	1st	NCAA Runner-Up
2019	Missy Meharg	17-4	.810	7-1	.875	1st	1st	NCAA 2nd Round
2020	Missy Meharg	8-7	.533	5-3	.625	T-4th	4th	Conference 2nd Round
2021	Missy Meharg	15-7	.682	4-4	.500	6th	6th	NCAA Final Four
2022	Missy Meharg	19-4	.826	7-1	.875	T-1st	2nd	NCAA Final Four

Season-by-season results through the end of the 2014 season

== Honours ==
=== National championships ===
Maryland has achieved considerable success in the NCAA tournament, winning eight national championships as well as reaching 21 Final Fours in 34 total tournament appearances. In 1987, the Terrapins won their first NCAA title under Sue Tyler, defeating North Carolina in the final. Under the guidance of Missy Meharg since 1988, Maryland has amassed seven more national titles.

Year	Coach	Opponent	Score	Record
1987	Sue Tyler	North Carolina Tar Heels	2–1	18–4–1
1993	Missy Meharg	North Carolina Tar Heels	2–1 (ps)	21–3
1999	Missy Meharg	Michigan Wolverines	2–1	24–1
2005	Missy Meharg	Duke Blue Devils	1–0	23–2
2006	Missy Meharg	Wake Forest Demon Deacons	1–0	23–2
2008	Missy Meharg	Wake Forest Demon Deacons	4–2	22–2
2010	Missy Meharg	North Carolina Tar Heels	3–2 (2OT)	23–1
2011	Missy Meharg	North Carolina Tar Heels	3–2 (OT)	19–4

=== Conference championships ===
Maryland has won 16 conference titles, 10 of which were conference tournament championships in the Atlantic Coast Conference (ACC) with the other 6 being Big Ten Conference regular-season titles.

Year	Coach	Conference Record	Overall Record	Conference	NCAA Result
1992	Missy Meharg	2–2	15–5–1	ACC	NCAA 2nd Round
1998	Missy Meharg	3–1	16–6	ACC	NCAA 2nd Round
1999	Missy Meharg	4–0	24–1	ACC	NCAA Champions
2000	Missy Meharg	2–2	19–4	ACC	NCAA Final Four
2001	Missy Meharg	3–1	20–4	ACC	NCAA Runner-Up
2005	Missy Meharg	4–1	23–2	ACC	NCAA Champions
2008	Missy Meharg	4–1	22–2	ACC	NCAA Champions
2009	Missy Meharg	5–0	23–1	ACC	NCAA Runner-Up
2010	Missy Meharg	5–0	23–1	ACC	NCAA Champions
2013	Missy Meharg	6–0	22–2	ACC	NCAA Final Four
2014	Missy Meharg	7–1	19–4	Big Ten	NCAA 2nd Round
2015	Missy Meharg	8-0	19-4	Big Ten	NCAA 1st Round
2016	Missy Meharg	7-1	18-5	Big Ten	NCAA 2nd Round
2018	Missy Meharg	7-1	22-3	Big Ten	NCAA Runner-up
2019	Missy Meharg	7-1	17-4	Big Ten	NCAA 2nd Round
2022	Missy Meharg	7-1	19-4	Big Ten	NCAA Final Four
16 Conference Championships; 10 ACC Championships, 6 Big Ten Championship

== Notable players ==
=== Honda Award winners ===
Year	Player
2001	Autumn Welsh
2005, 2006	Paula Infante
2008	Susie Rowe
2009, 2010	Katie O'Donnell
2011	Megan Frazer

=== All-Americans ===
Key
First-team selection	Second-team selection	Third-team selection

Season	Player	Remarks
1979	Laura LeMire	
1983	Andrea LeMire	
1985	Kim Turner	
1986	Kim Chorosiewski	
1986	Kim Turner	Second selection
1986	Jessica Wilk	
1987	Kim Turner	Third selection; Second first-team selection
1987	Jessica Wilk	Second selection
1988	Kim Turner	Fourth selection; Third first-team selection
1988	Jessica Wilk	Third selection
1989	Lisa Buente	
1990	Lisa Buente	Second first-team selection
1991	Lisa Rowe	
1991	Amy Schubert	
1991	Mandy Stevenson	
1992	Lisa Rowe	Second selection
1992	Sabrina Salam	
1992	Amy Schubert	Second selection
1992	Boukje Vermeulen	
1993	Laura Harmon	
1993	Irene Horvat	
1993	Sabrina Salam	Second first-team selection
1993	Amy Schubert	Third selection
1993	Maureen Scott	
1993	Lori Vile	
1994	Laura Harmon	Second selection
1994	Irene Horvat	Second selection
1994	Katie Kauffman	
1995	Tricia Burdt	
1995	Christine DeBow	
1995	Sarah Rosenwinkel	
1996	Tricia Burdt	Second first-team selection
1996	Christine DeBow	Second first-team selection
1996	Katie Kauffman	Second first-team selection
1996	Jen Pratt	
1997	Nadine Bennett	
1997	Christine DeBow	Third first-team selection
1997	Lynsey McVicker	
1997	Jen Pratt	Second selection
1997	Carla Tagliente	

Season	Player	Remarks
1998	Jen Pratt	Third selection
1998	Keli Smith	
1998	Carla Tagliente	Second selection
1999	Rachel Hiskins	
1999	Keli Smith	Second selection
1999	Carla Tagliente	Third selection; Second first-team selection
1999	Caroline Walter	
2000	Rachel Hiskins	Second selection
2000	Molly Kauffman	
2000	Keli Smith	Third selection
2000	Carla Tagliente	Fourth selection; Third first-team selection
2000	Caroline Walter	Second selection
2000	Autumn Welsh	
2001	Rachel Hiskins	Third selection
2001	Carissa Messimer	
2001	Dina Rizzo	
2001	Autumn Welsh	Second selection
2002	Colleen Barbieri	
2002	Carissa Messimer	Second selection
2002	Izzy Palmer	
2002	Lauren Powley	
2003	Jackie Ciconte	
2003	Paula Infante	
2003	Lauren Powley	Second selection
2004	Jackie Ciconte	
2004	Kristin Harris	
2004	Paula Infante	Second first-team selection
2004	Lauren Powley	Third selection; Second first-team selection
2004	Sara Silvetti	
2005	Emily Beach	
2005	Jackie Ciconte	Second selection
2005	Paula Infante	Third first-team selection
2005	Kathryn Masson	
2005	Lauren Powley	Fourth selection; Third first-team selection
2006	Kristina Edmonds	
2006	Paula Infante	Fourth first-team selection
2006	Kathryn Masson	Second selection
2006	Nicole Muracco	
2006	Susie Rowe	

Season	Player	Remarks
2007	Kathryn Masson	Third selection; Second first-team selection
2007	Katie O'Donnell	
2007	Susie Rowe	Second first-team selection
2007	Janneke van Leeuwen	
2008	Brianna Davies	
2008	Alicia Grater	
2008	Katie O'Donnell	Second first-team selection
2008	Susie Rowe	Third first-team selection
2009	Alicia Grater	Second selection
2009	Nicole Muracco	Second selection
2009	Katie O'Donnell	Third first-team selection
2009	Alexis Pappas	
2009	Emma Thomas	
2010	Jemma Buckley	
2010	Megan Frazer	
2010	Katie O'Donnell	Fourth first-team selection
2010	Jill Witmer	
2011	Jemma Buckley	Second selection
2011	Megan Frazer	Second first-team selection
2011	Harriet Tibble	
2011	Jill Witmer	Second selection
2012	Megan Frazer	Third first-team selection
2012	Harriet Tibble	Second selection
2012	Jill Witmer	Third selection; Second first-team selection
2013	Maxine Fluharty	
2013	Natalie Hunter	
2013	Ali McEvoy	
2013	Sarah Sprink	
2014	Maxine Fluharty	Second selection
2014	Katie Gerzebek	
2014	Sarah Sprink	Second selection

=== Olympians ===
Olympics	Player	Country
1996	Katie Kauffman	United States
2008	Lauren Powley	United States
2008	Dina Rizzo	United States
2008	Sara Silvetti	United States
2008	Keli Smith	United States

Awards and accolades through the end of the 2014 season

=== Internationals ===
United States

- Chris DeBow
- Katie Kauffman
- Katie O'Donnell Bam
- Lauren Powley
- Dina Rizzo
- Sara Silvetti
- Keli Smith Puzo
- Carla Tagliente
- Jill Witmer

Ireland

- Lauren Barr
- Megan Frazer
- Lynsey McVicker
- Angela Platt

England/Great Britain

- Grace Balsdon

== Stadium ==
Maryland has played its home games at the Field Hockey & Lacrosse Complex since its opening in 2003. The facility, which the field hockey team shares with the school's women's lacrosse program, has a seating capacity of 2,000 as well as an AstroTurf 12 playing surface. The complex was built adjacent to the Xfinity Center, the home of the Maryland men's and women's basketball teams, which also houses field hockey locker rooms, showers, and training room facilities. Built in two stages, the Complex was fully completed in time for the Terrapins to host the 2005 ACC Tournament. The playing surface itself and a remote watering system were constructed during the first stage, while athletic training facilities, locker rooms, and a concourse-level plaza complete with restrooms and concession facilities were added in the second stage.

== See also ==
- List of NCAA Division I field hockey programs
