= Wake Forest Demon Deacons field hockey =

College field hockey team

- Founded: 1971
- University: Wake Forest University
- Head coach: Jennifer Averill (35th season)
- Stadium: Kentner Stadium
- Location: Winston-Salem, North Carolina
- Conference: ACC
- Nickname: Demon Deacons
- Colors: Old gold and black

NCAA Tournament championships
- 2002, 2003, 2004

NCAA Tournament Runner-Up
- 2006, 2008

NCAA Tournament Final Fours
- 2000, 2001, 2002, 2003, 2004, 2005, 2006, 2007, 2008, 2018

NCAA Tournament Quarterfinals
- 1999, 2000, 2001, 2002, 2003, 2004, 2005, 2006, 2007, 2008, 2009, 2013, 2018

NCAA Tournament appearances
- 1999, 2000, 2001, 2002, 2003, 2004, 2005, 2006, 2007, 2008, 2009, 2010, 2013, 2014, 2015, 2017, 2018, 2022

Conference Tournament championships
- 2002, 2003, 2006, 2014

Wake Forest Demon Deacons field hockey is the team who represents Wake Forest University and they play their home games at Kentner Stadium in Winston-Salem, North Carolina. It competes as part of the ACC in NCAA Division I. The Demon Deacons are coached by Jennifer Averill.

== History ==
The Wake Forest field hockey program began in 1971 but experienced minimal success in its first three decades of existence.

After the arrival of head coach Jennifer Averill in 1992, the program experienced major national success.

In 2002, Wake Forest broke through to win its first ACC championship and went on to win the 2002 national title. The Demon Deacons were a dynasty in college field hockey in the 2000s, winning three consecutive national titles in 2002, 2003, and 2004.

In 2006 and 2008 Wake Forest was national runner-ups, losing both times to Maryland in the championship.

== See also ==
- List of NCAA Division I field hockey programs
