= UConn Huskies field hockey =

- University: University of Connecticut
- Conference: Big East Conference
- Head coach: Paul Caddy (7th season)
- Location: Storrs, Connecticut
- Colors: National flag blue and white

NCAA Tournament championships
- 1981, 1985, 2013, 2014, 2017

NCAA Tournament Runner-up
- 1982, 1983

NCAA Tournament Final Four
- 1981, 1982, 1983, 1984, 1985, 1998, 1999, 2006, 2007, 2011, 2013, 2014, 2015, 2016, 2017, 2026

NCAA Tournament appearances
- 1981, 1982, 1983, 1984, 1985, 1986, 1988, 1990, 1996, 1997, 1998, 1999, 2000, 2002, 2003, 2004, 2005, 2006, 2007, 2008, 2009, 2010, 2011, 2012, 2013, 2014, 2015, 2016, 2017, 2018, 2019, 2020, 2024, 2025, 2026

Conference Tournament championships
- 1992, 1996, 1998, 1999, 2000, 2002, 2004, 2005, 2006, 2007, 2009, 2012, 2013, 2014, 2015, 2016, 2017, 2018, 2019, 2020, 2024

Conference regular season championships
- 1996, 1997, 1998, 1999, 2000, 2002, 2003, 2004, 2005, 2007, 2008, 2011, 2013, 2014, 2015, 2016, 2017, 2018, 2019, 2020, 2024, 2026

The UConn Huskies field hockey team represents the University of Connecticut in the sport of field hockey at the NCAA Division I level Big East Conference. The Huskies play at Nancy Stevens Field at the George J. Sherman Complex. UConn is led by head coach Paul Caddy.

The Huskies have won five national championships, including 1981, 1985, 2013, 2014, and 2017, also finished as runner up twice (1982 and 1983), and appeared in 16 total Final Fours. The team most recently appeared in the NCAA tournament in 2026.

== Notable players ==
=== Internationals ===
United States

- Tracey Fuchs
- Melissa González
- Diane Madl

Germany

- Cécile Pieper

Great Britain

- Sophie Hamilton

Ireland

- Roisin Upton

== Head coaches ==
| Name | First season | Final season | Total seasons | W | L | T | Pct |
|---|---|---|---|---|---|---|---|
| Faye Delmore | 1974 | 1974 | 1 | 6 | 1 | 3 | .750 |
| Diane Wright | 1975 | 1989 | 15 | 212 | 62 | 25 | .751 |
| Nancy Stevens | 1990 | 2019 | 30 | 700 | 189 | 24 | .780 |
| Paul Caddy | 2020 | | 5 | 56 | 37 | | .602 |

== See also ==
- List of NCAA Division I field hockey programs
