= Penn State Nittany Lions field hockey =

Field hockey team of Penn State University

Penn State Nittany Lions
- University: Pennsylvania State University
- Conference: Big Ten Conference
- First season: 1964
- Athletic director: Dr. Patrick Kraft
- Head coach: Hannah Prince; 2026 season
- Field: Char Morett-Curtiss Field at the Penn State Field Hockey Complex; Capacity: 1200
- Location: State College, Pennsylvania
- Colors: Blue and white

NCAA Tournament championships
- 1980 (AIAW), 1981 (AIAW)

NCAA Tournament Runner-up
- 1979 (AIAW), 2002, 2007

NCAA Tournament Final Four
- 1982, 1986, 1990, 1991, 1993, 2002, 2007, 2022

NCAA Tournament appearances
- 1982, 1983, 1984, 1985, 1986, 1987, 1988, 1989, 1990, 1991, 1992, 1993, 1994, 1995, 1996, 1997, 1998, 1999, 2000, 2002, 2003, 2005, 2006, 2007, 2008, 2010, 2011, 2012, 2013, 2014, 2016, 2017, 2018, 2021, 2022

Conference Tournament championships
- 1989, 1990, 1995, 1996, 1997, 1998, 2011, 2012, 2016

Conference regular season championships
- 1988, 1989, 1990, 1993, 1997, 1998, 2005, 2008, 2012, 2013, 2022

The Penn State Nittany Lions field hockey team is the intercollegiate field hockey program representing Pennsylvania State University. The school competes in the Big Ten Conference in Division I of the National Collegiate Athletic Association (NCAA), although it was also previously a member of the Atlantic 10 Conference (A-10). The Penn State field hockey team plays its home games at Char Morett-Curtiss Field at the Penn State Field Hockey Complex on the university campus in State College, Pennsylvania. The Nittany Lions captured the Association for Intercollegiate Athletics for Women (AIAW) national championship twice, in 1980 and 1981, and have won 10 regular-season conference titles as well as eight conference tournament championships. While Penn State has qualified for the NCAA tournament 30 times, and has made seven appearances in the semifinals and two in the championship game, it has never won the NCAA national championship.

Penn State's head coaching position became open for just the second time since 1986 in December 2025, when the team did not renew the contract of Lisa Bervinchak Love after three seasons. On January 13, 2026, former Saint Joseph's head coach Hannah Prince was hired to become the seventh head coach in program history. Three days later, Prince appointed Mark Wadsley, with whom she had coached at Saint Joseph’s from 2023 to 2025, as Penn State associate head coach.

The Nittany Lions clinched their first postseason appearance since 2023 during their first year under Prince, doing so just four games into the eight-game Big Ten schedule.

== History ==
Field hockey has been a varsity sport at Penn State since 1964. In 1980 and 1981, the Nittany Lions won back-to-back Association for Intercollegiate Athletics for Women (AIAW) national championships. Penn State played in the Atlantic 10 Conference (A-10) between 1988 and 1990, and has been a member of the Big Ten Conference since 1992. The team has won 10 regular-season conference titles (three in the A-10 and seven in the Big Ten) as well as eight conference tournament championships (two in the A-10 and six in the Big Ten). The Nittany Lions have appeared in the NCAA tournament 30 times, including seven appearances in the semifinals and two in the championship game, but have never won the NCAA national championship.

=== Season-by-season results ===
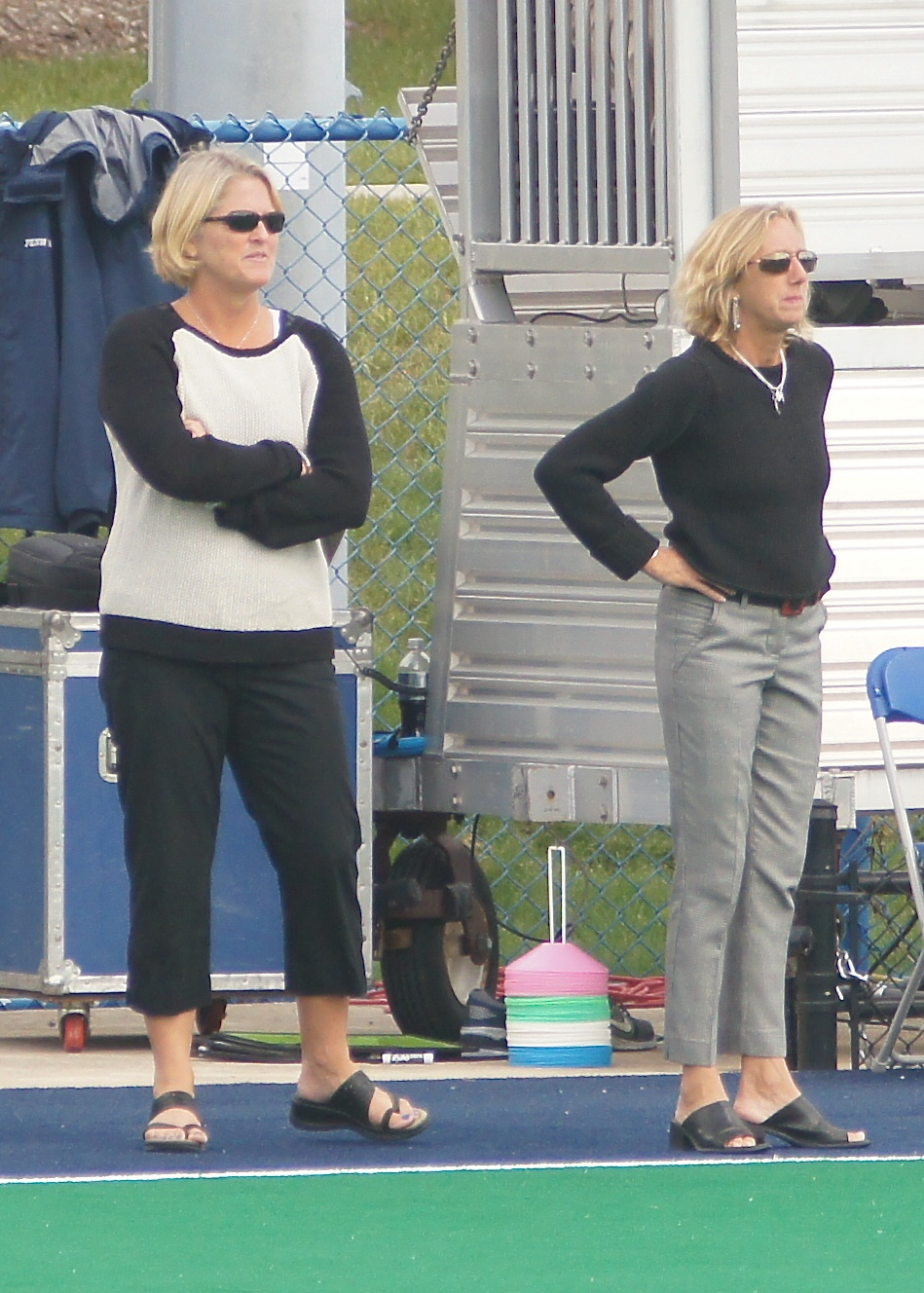
Coaches Lisa Bervinchak-Love (L) and Charlene Morett-Curtiss (R) on sideline during a game on September 14, 2014

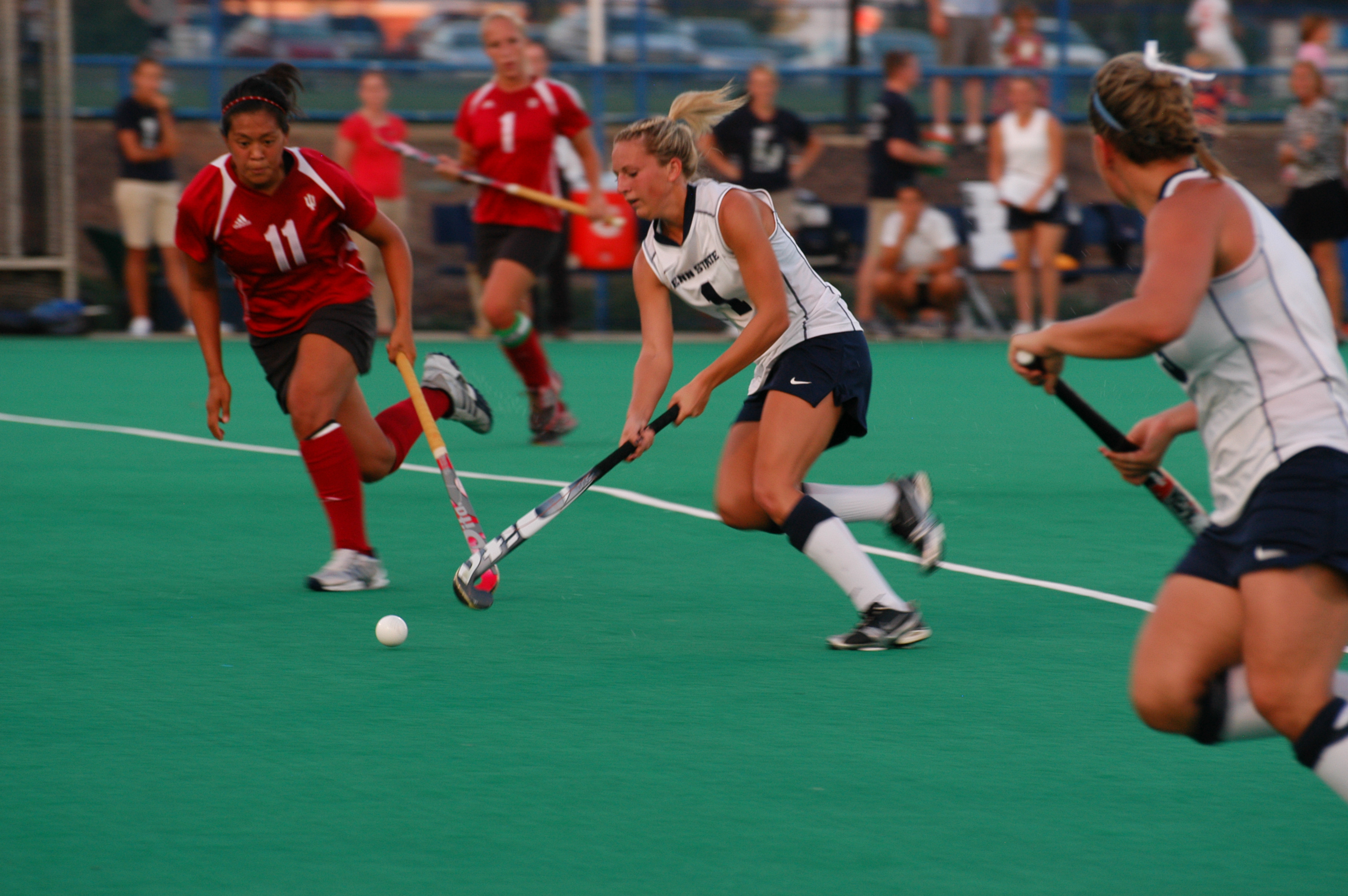
The 2010 Penn State field hockey team in action against Indiana

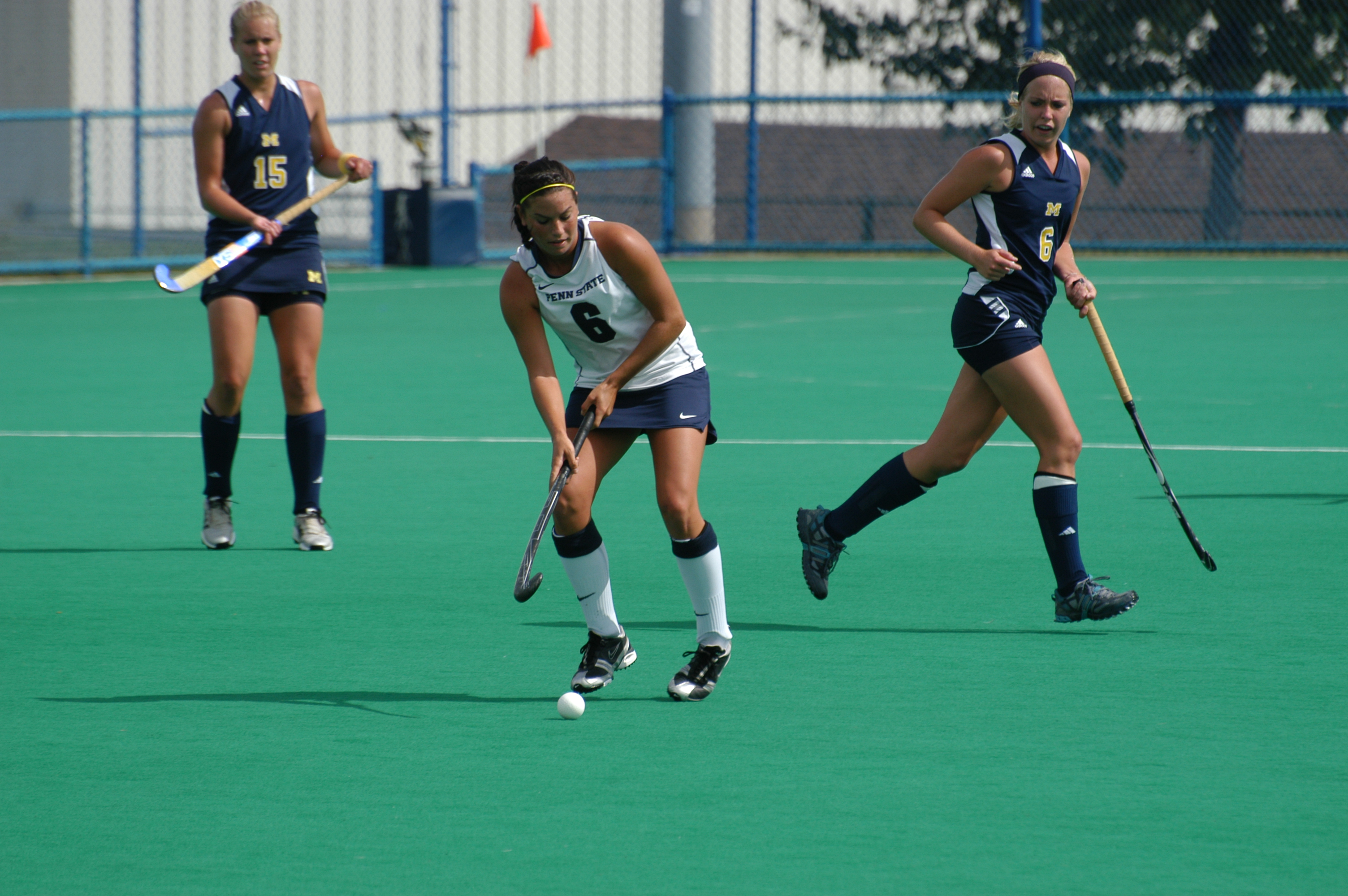
The 2010 Penn State field hockey team in action against Michigan

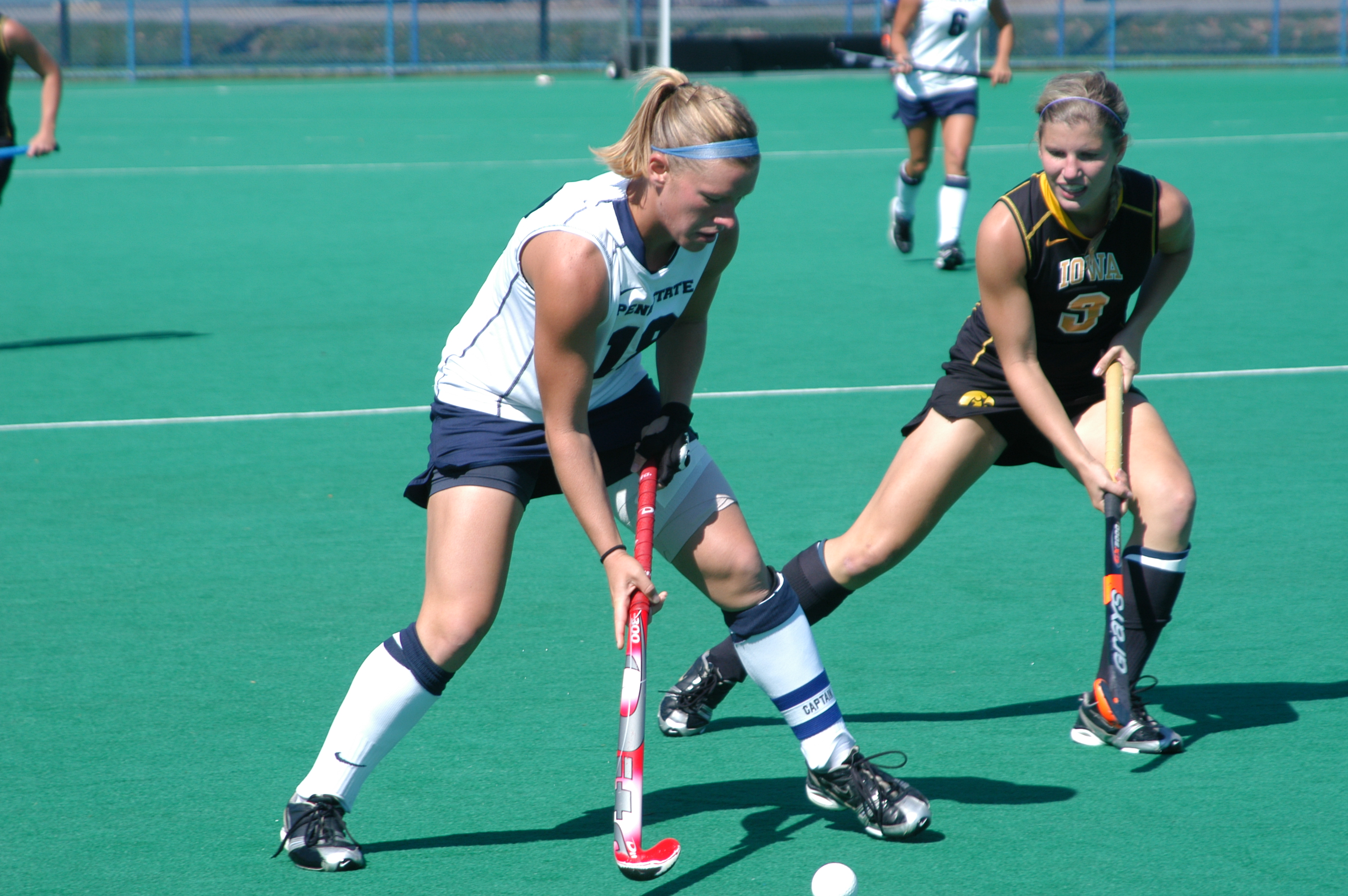
The 2010 Penn State field hockey team in action against Iowa

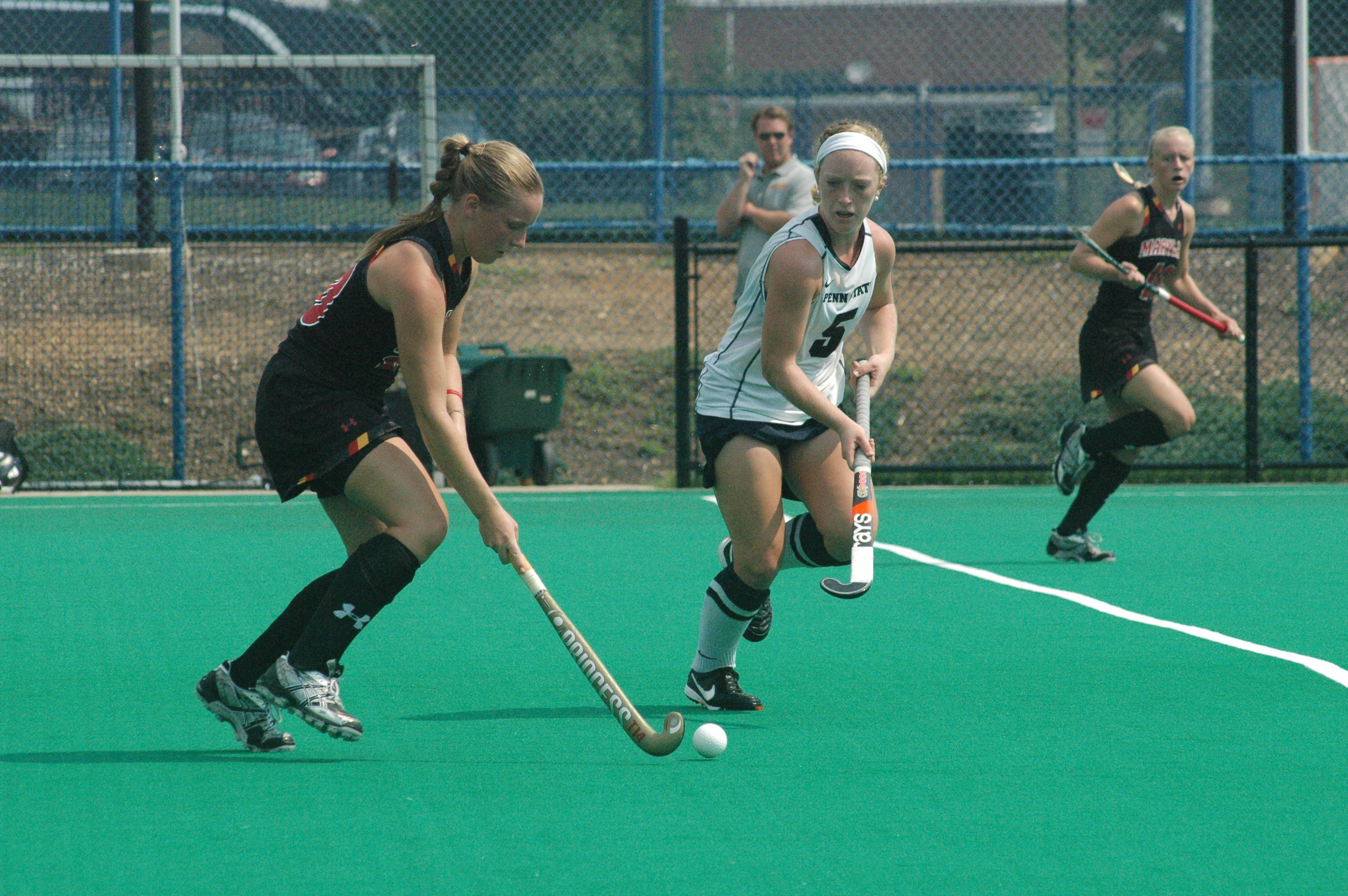
The 2011 Penn State field hockey team in action against Maryland

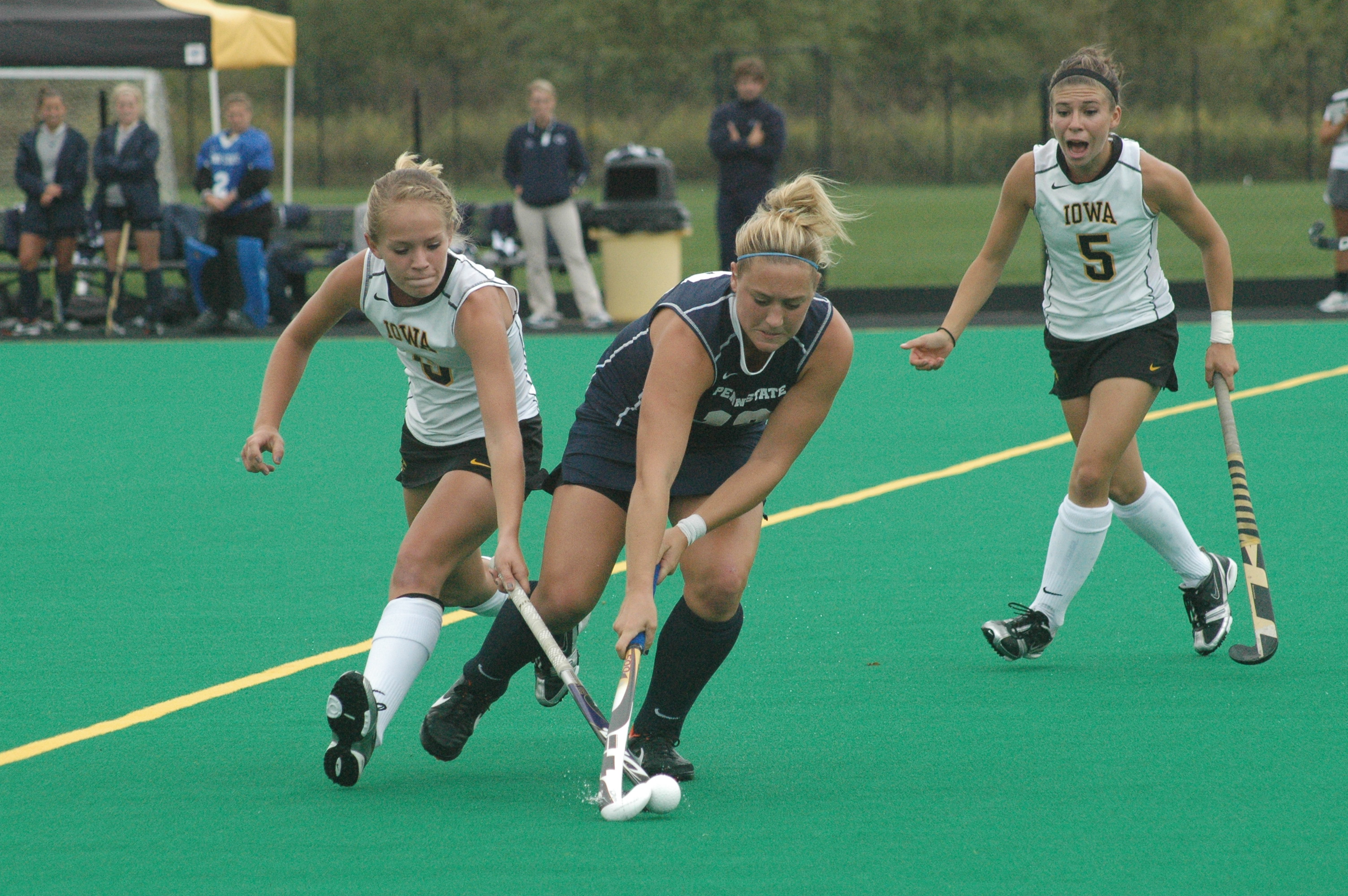
The 2011 Penn State field hockey team in action at Iowa

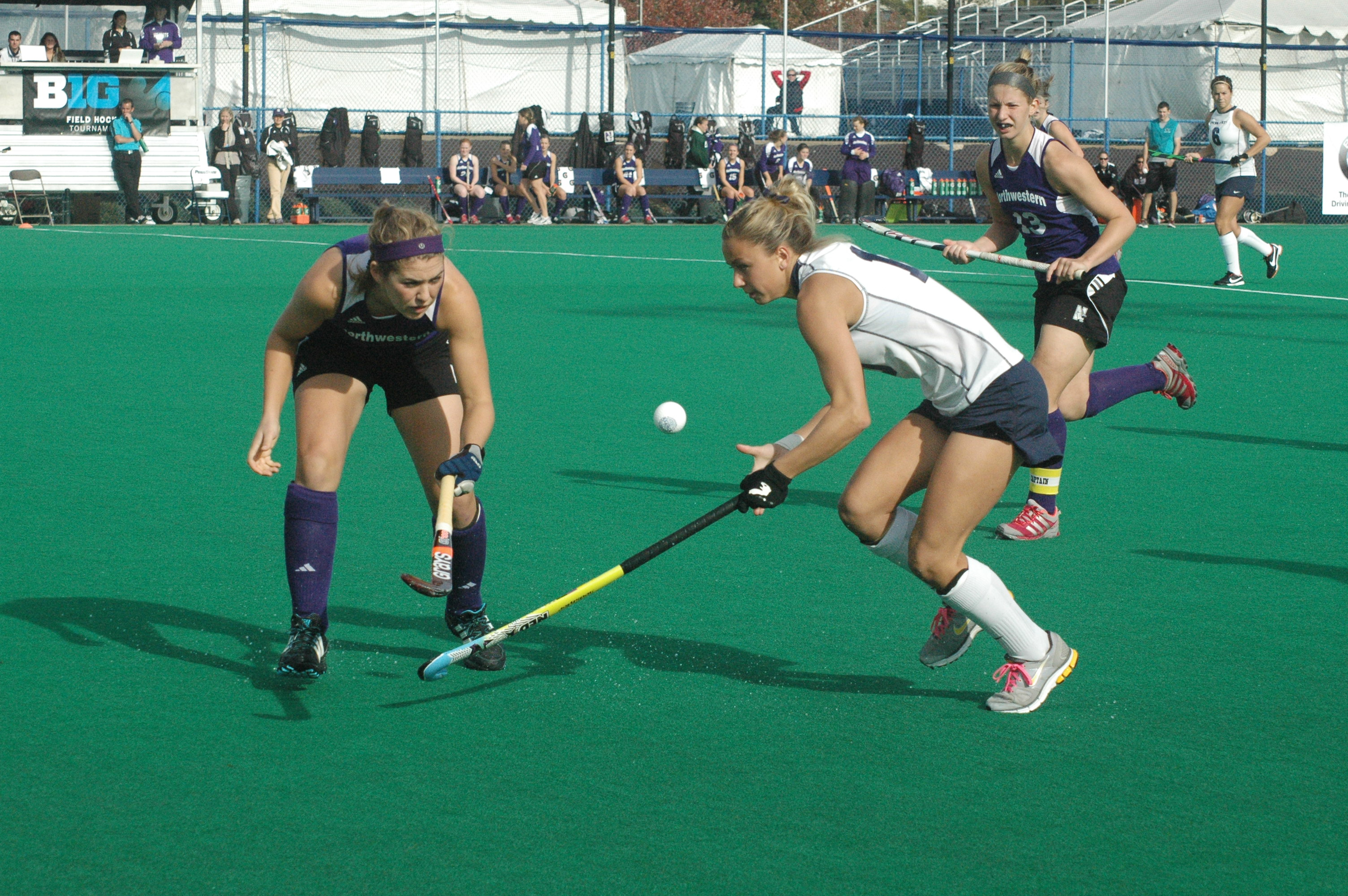
The 2011 Penn State field hockey team in action against Northwestern

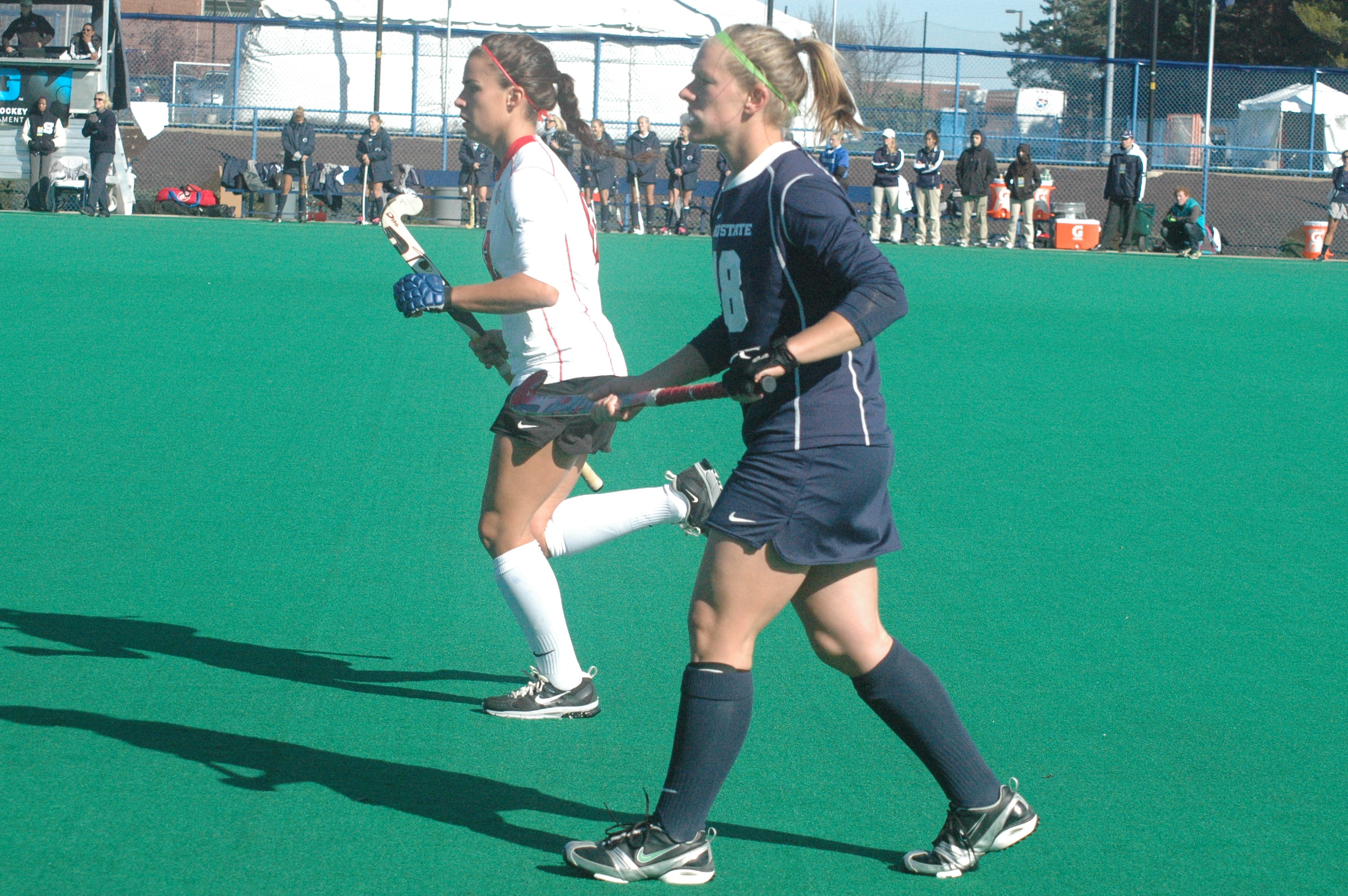
The 2011 Penn State field hockey team in action against Ohio State

Year	Head coach	Overall	Pct.	Conf.	Pct.	Conf. Place	Conf. Tourn.	Postseason
1964	Pat Seni	4–0	1.000	–	–	–	–	–
1965	Pat Seni	1–3–1	.300	–	–	–	–	–
1966	Pat Seni	1–2–1	.375	–	–	–	–	–
1967	Pat Seni	3–2	.600	–	–	–	–	–
1968	Pat Seni	2–2–1	.500	–	–	–	–	–
1969	Nancy Bailey	3–3	.500	–	–	–	–	–
1970	Tonya Toole	1–5–1	.214	–	–	–	–	–
1971	Tonya Toole	5–3	.625	–	–	–	–	–
1972	Tonya Toole	4–3–1	.563	–	–	–	–	–
1973	Tonya Toole	3–2–3	.563	–	–	–	–	–
1974	Gillian Rattray	5–2–2	.667	–	–	–	–	–
1975	Gillian Rattray	6–4–2	.583	–	–	–	–	–
1976	Gillian Rattray	9–3–2	.714	–	–	–	–	–
1977	Gillian Rattray	8–8	.500	–	–	–	–	–
1978	Gillian Rattray	13–1–3	.853	–	–	–	–	–
1979	Gillian Rattray	18–3	.857	–	–	–	–	AIAW Runner-Up
1980	Gillian Rattray	20–0–2	.955	–	–	–	–	AIAW Champions
1981	Gillian Rattray	19–2–1	.886	–	–	–	–	AIAW Champions
1982	Gillian Rattray	14–6	.700	–	–	–	–	NCAA Final Four
1983	Gillian Rattray	14–3–5	.750	–	–	–	–	NCAA 2nd Round
1984	Gillian Rattray	14–8–1	.630	–	–	–	–	NCAA 1st Round
1985	Gillian Rattray	16–4–1	.786	–	–	–	–	NCAA 1st Round
1986	Gillian Rattray	18–5–2	.760	–	–	–	–	NCAA Final Four
1987	Charlene Morett	14–5–2	.714	–	–	–	–	NCAA 1st Round
1988	Charlene Morett	15–6–1	.705	2–0	1.000	1st (West)	2nd	NCAA 2nd Round
1989	Charlene Morett	18–3–1	.841	4–0–1	.900	1st	1st	NCAA 1st Round
1990	Charlene Morett	21–4	.840	4–1	.800	T1st	1st	NCAA Final Four
1991	Charlene Morett	18–3–1	.841	–	–	–	–	NCAA Final Four
1992	Charlene Morett	16–5–1	.750	8–2	.800	2nd	–	NCAA 2nd Round
1993	Charlene Morett	20–2	.909	9–1	.900	1st	–	NCAA Final Four
1994	Charlene Morett	13–7–2	.636	6–3–1	.650	2nd	T3rd	NCAA 2nd Round
1995	Charlene Morett	15–9	.625	6–4	.600	T2nd	1st	NCAA 2nd Round
1996	Charlene Morett	14–9	.609	6–4	.600	T2nd	1st	NCAA 1st Round
1997	Charlene Morett	18–6	.750	7–3	.700	T1st	1st	NCAA 2nd Round
1998	Charlene Morett	18–5	.783	8–2	.800	1st	1st	NCAA 2nd Round
1999	Charlene Morett	17–5	.773	8–2	.800	2nd	T3rd	NCAA 1st Round
2000	Charlene Morett	17–6	.739	5–1	.833	2nd	2nd	NCAA 1st Round
2001	Charlene Morett	12–7	.632	3–3	.500	T4th	T5th	–
2002	Charlene Morett	19–5	.792	4–2	.667	3rd	T3rd	NCAA Runner-Up
2003	Charlene Morett	18–7	.720	3–3	.500	4th	2nd	NCAA 2nd Round
2004	Charlene Morett	10–10	.500	3–3	.500	4th	T5th	–
2005	Charlene Morett	17–4	.810	6–0	1.000	1st	T3rd	NCAA 1st Round
2006	Charlene Morett	16–6	.727	4–2	.667	T2nd	2nd	NCAA 2nd Round
2007	Charlene Morett	16–8	.667	3–3	.500	4th	T3rd	NCAA Runner-Up
2008	Charlene Morett	13–7	.650	5–1	.833	1st	T3rd	NCAA 1st Round
2009	Charlene Morett	7–13	.350	1–5	.167	T6th	T3rd	–
2010	Charlene Morett	14–6	.700	4–2	.667	3rd	T3rd	NCAA 1st Round
2011	Charlene Morett	17–6	.739	4–2	.667	3rd	1st	NCAA 2nd Round
2012	Charlene Morett	18–4	.818	5–1	.833	1st	1st	NCAA 2nd Round
2013	Charlene Morett	13–6	.684	5–1	.833	T1st	T3rd	NCAA 1st Round
2014	Charlene Morett	16–6	.727	5–3	.625	4th	T3rd	NCAA 2nd Round
2015	Charlene Morett	9–10	.474	4–4	.500	T4th	T3rd	-
2016	Charlene Morett	17–2	.895	6–2	.750	2nd	1st	NCAA 1st Round
2017	Charlene Morett	16–4	.800	6–2	.750	T2nd	2nd	NCAA 2nd Round
2018	Charlene Morett	12–6	.667	6–2	.750	3rd	T5th	NCAA 1st Round
2019	Charlene Morett	8–12	.400	4–4	.500	T5th	2nd	-
2020	Charlene Morett	7–7	.500	5–2	.714	2nd	T5th	-
2021	Charlene Morett	14–6	.700	6–2	.750	T2nd	T3rd	NCAA 1st Round
2022	Charlene Morett	17-4	.810	7–1	.875	1st	T3rd	NCAA Final Four
2023	Lisa Bervinchak-Love	9-8	.529	4-5	.444	T4th	T5th	-
2024	Lisa Bervinchak-Love	8-9	.471	2-6	.250	T7th	–	-
2025	Lisa Bervinchak-Love	7-10	.412	2-6	.250	8th	–	-
2026	Hannah Prince	12-6	.667	6-3	.667	3rd	T5th	-

*

=== Coaching history ===
Years	Head coach	Overall	Pct.	Conf.	Pct.
1964–1968	Pat Seni	11-9-3	.543	-	-
1969	Nancy Bailey	3-3	.500	-	-
1970–1973	Tonya Toole	13-13-5	.500	-	-
1974–1986	Gillian Rattray	174-49-16	.762	-	-
1987–2022	Charlene Morett	530-221-6	.704	172-73-2	.700
2023–2025	Lisa Bervinchak-Love	24-27	.471	8-17	.320
2026-present	Hannah Prince	12-6	.667	6-3	.667

== Awards and accolades ==
=== National championships ===
Before the advent of NCAA field hockey, Penn State won two AIAW national championships, in 1980 and 1981. Since the NCAA has sanctioned field hockey, the Nittany Lions have appeared in the NCAA tournament 30 times, including seven appearances in the semifinals and two in the championship game, although they have never won the NCAA national championship.

Year	Coach	Opponent	Score	Record
1980	Gillian Rattray	California Golden Bears	2–1	20–0–2
1981	Gillian Rattray	Temple Owls	5–1	19–2–1

=== Conference championships ===
Penn State has won 11 conference titles, three in the Atlantic 10 Conference (A-10) and eight in the Big Ten Conference.

Year	Coach	Conference Record	Overall Record	Conference	NCAA Result
1988	Charlene Morett	2–0	15–6–1	A-10	NCAA 2nd Round
1989	Charlene Morett	4–0–1	18–3–1	A-10	NCAA 1st Round
1990	Charlene Morett	4–1	21–4	A-10	NCAA Final Four
1993	Charlene Morett	9–1	20–2	Big Ten	NCAA Final Four
1997	Charlene Morett	7–3	18–6	Big Ten	NCAA 2nd Round
1998	Charlene Morett	8–2	18–5	Big Ten	NCAA 2nd Round
2005	Charlene Morett	6–0	17–4	Big Ten	NCAA 1st Round
2008	Charlene Morett	5–1	13–7	Big Ten	NCAA 1st Round
2012	Charlene Morett	5–1	18–4	Big Ten	NCAA 2nd Round
2013	Charlene Morett	5–1	13–6	Big Ten	NCAA 1st Round
2022	Charlene Morett	7–1	17–4	Big Ten	NCAA Final Four
11 Conference Championships; 3 A-10 Championships, 8 Big Ten Championships

=== National Player of the Year winners ===
Year	Player
1982	Brenda Stauffer

=== All-Americans ===
Key
First-team selection	Second-team selection	Third-team selection

Season	Player	Remarks
1977	Charlene Morett	
1978	Chris Larson	
1978	Charlene Morett	Second first-team selection
1979	Candy Finn	
1979	Jeannie Fissinger	
1979	Charlene Morett	Third first-team selection
1979	Jan Snyder	
1980	Candy Finn	Second first-team selection
1981	Brenda Stauffer	
1982	Tracy Houston	
1982	Judy Mahaffey	
1982	Brenda Stauffer	Second first-team selection
1985	Mary McCarthy	
1985	Chris Vitale	
1986	Mary McCarthy	Second first-team selection
1987	Tami Worley	
1988	Lisa Bervinchak	
1988	Tami Worley	Second first-team selection
1989	Kristen Winters	
1990	Chelle Frates	
1990	Eleanor Stone	
1990	Kristen Winters	Second first-team selection
1991	Susann Bisignaro	
1991	Michelle Brennan	
1991	Stacy Gilburg	
1991	Christine McGinley	
1991	Jen Stewart	
1991	Eleanor Stone	Second first-team selection
1992	Becca Main	
1992	Christine McGinley	Second selection
1992	Amy Stairs	
1992	Jen Stewart	Second selection
1993	Kirstie Benedict	
1993	Chris Blais	
1993	Becca Main	Second selection
1993	Christine McGinley	Third selection; Second first-team selection
1993	Shelly Meister	
1994	Chris Blais	Second selection
1994	Sharon Kuntz	
1994	Jill Pearsall	
1995	Jen Coletta	
1995	Meghann Spratt	

Season	Player	Remarks
1996	Heather Gorlaski	
1996	Tara Maguire	
1997	Heather Gorlaski	Second selection
1997	Kim Hicks	
1997	Dawn Lammey	
1997	Sonje Volla	
1998	Traci Anselmo	
1998	Heather Gorlaski	Third selection; Second first-team selection
1998	Dawn Lammey	Second selection
1998	Jamie Smith	
1998	Sonje Volla	Second selection
1999	Traci Anselmo	Second selection
1999	Maegan Gaile	
1999	Tracy Larson	
1999	Mandy Robinson	
2000	Traci Anselmo	Third selection; Second first-team selection
2000	Kiley Kulina	
2000	Jill Martz	
2001	Kiley Kulina	Second selection
2001	Timarie Legel	
2001	Jill Martz	Second selection
2002	Kelly Concini	
2002	Heather Conroy	
2002	Timarie Legel	Second selection
2002	Jill Martz	Third selection; Second first-team selection
2003	Heather Conroy	Second first-team selection
2003	Timarie Legel	Third selection
2003	Neilye Stoner	
2004	Amanda Eckert	
2004	Bekah Hostetler	
2005	Natalie Berrena	
2005	Sara Cahill	
2005	Kiersten Wood	
2006	Jen Beaumont	
2006	Annelise Legel	
2006	Jen Long	
2006	Kiersten Wood	Second selection

Season	Player	Remarks
2007	Jen Long	Second selection
2007	Allison Scola	
2007	Mallory Weisen	
2007	Kiersten Wood	Third selection; Second first-team selection
2008	Jen Beaumont	Second selection
2008	Jen Long	Third selection; Second first-team selection
2008	Allison Scola	Second selection
2010	Kelsey Amy	
2010	Ayla Halus	
2010	Jessica Longstreth	
2011	Kelsey Amy	Second selection
2011	Laura Gebhart	
2011	Ayla Halus	Second selection
2012	Kelsey Amy	Third selection; Second first-team selection
2012	Laura Gebhart	Second selection
2012	Brittany Grzywacz	
2013	Laura Gebhart	Third selection
2013	Brittany Grzywacz	Second selection
2014	Laura Gebhart	Fourth selection
2014	Taylor Herold	
2016	Aurelia Meijer	
2016	Moira Putsch	
2017	Skyler Fretz	
2017	Moira Putsch	Second selection
2018	Gini Bramley	
2018	Cori Conley	
2018	Moira Putsch	Third selection
2019	Maddie Morano	
2020	Sophia Gladieux	
2021	Mackenzie Allessie	
2021	Sophia Gladieux	Second selection; First first-team selection
2022	Mackenzie Allessie	Second selection
2022	Brie Barraco	
2022	Sophia Gladieux	Third selection; Second first-team selection
2022	Anna Simon	
2023	Mackenzie Allessie	Third selection
2023	Sophia Gladieux	Fourth selection; Third first-team selection

=== Olympians ===
Olympics	Player	Country
1980	Chris Larson	United States
1980	Charlene Morett	United States
1984	Chris Larson	United States
1984	Charlene Morett	United States
1984	Brenda Stauffer	United States
2024	Sophia Gladieux	United States

Individual honors through the end of the 2023 season

== Stadium ==
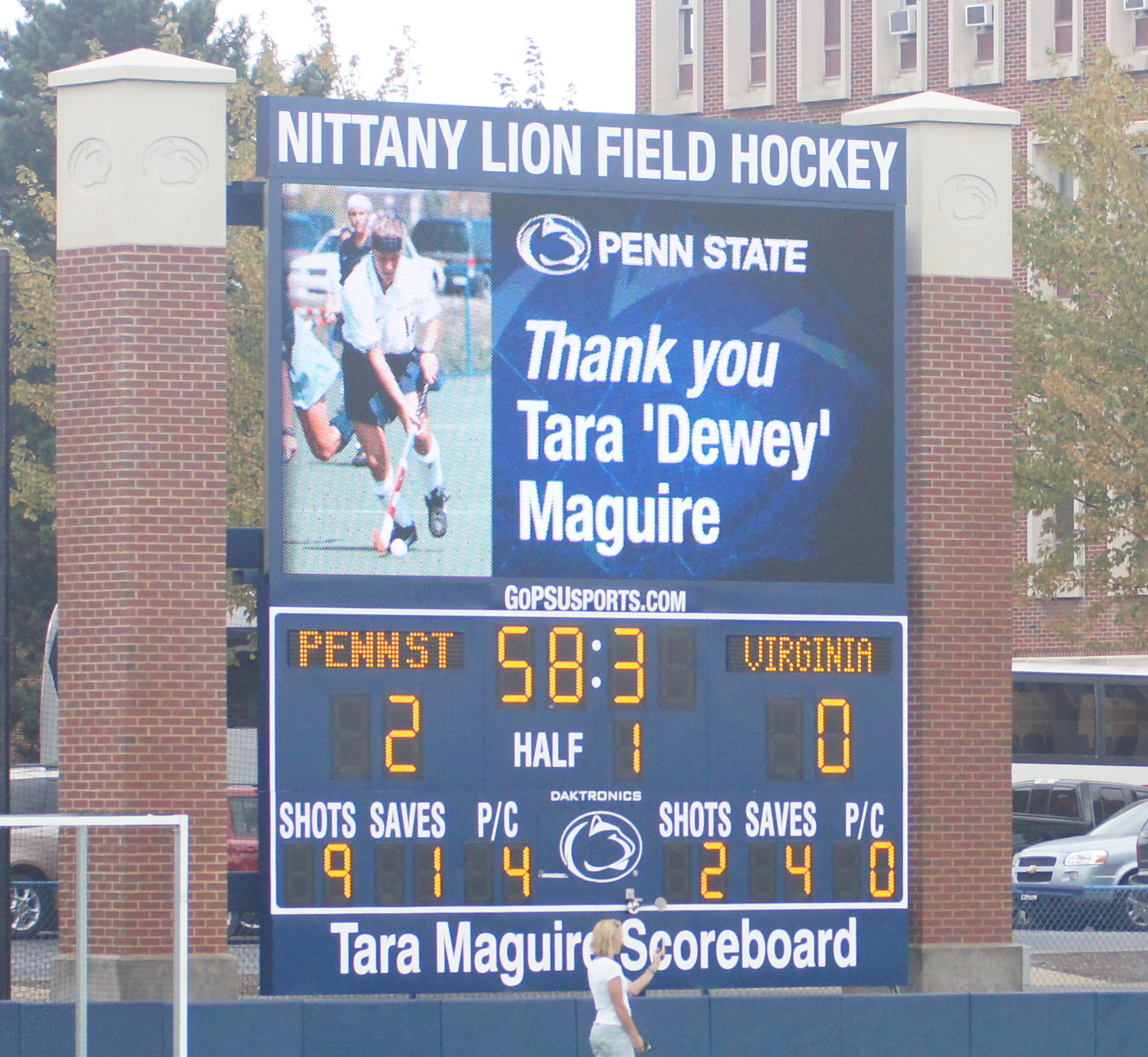
New scoreboard during dedication ceremony at halftime, August 26, 2012

Penn State has played its home games at the Penn State Field Hockey Complex since its opening in 2005. The complex was renovated in 2022-2023, increasing the seating capacity to 1,200 as well as adding an enclosed press booth, locker room space for officials, a ticket office, public restrooms and concession areas. Upgrades were also made to the home and visiting team dressing areas. The scoreboard was upgraded in 2012 to include a 20' x 10' video screen. The field itself boasts an advanced field watering system as well as floodlights that allow for the playing of night games. Built adjacent to Bigler Field, the former home of the Nittany Lions field hockey program, the Penn State Field Hockey Complex has witnessed success both on the field and in the stands; in both 2005 and 2006, Penn State did not lose a home game all season, while in 2006 the school finished fifth in the country in home attendance (2006 was the first year that the NCAA kept attendance statistics for field hockey). Before the Nittany Lions field hockey team moved to the complex in 2005, it had previously played at four other venues: Pollock Field (1964–75), Lady Lion Field (1976–88), Holuba Hall (1989–95), and Bigler Field (1996–2004).

== See also ==
- List of NCAA Division I field hockey programs
