= Eastern Lancaster County School District =

School district in Pennsylvania

Location
- New Holland; Lancaster County; Pennsylvania United States

District information
- Grades: K–12
- Superintendent: Michael Snopkowski

Students and staff
- Colors: Blue and gray

Other information
- Website: elanco.org

The Eastern Lancaster County School District (ELanCo) is a school district in Lancaster County, Pennsylvania, United States. It serves the townships of Brecknock, Caernarvon, Earl, and East Earl, as well as the boroughs of New Holland and Terre Hill. The school district is a member of Lancaster–Lebanon Intermediate Unit (IU) 13.

== Schools ==
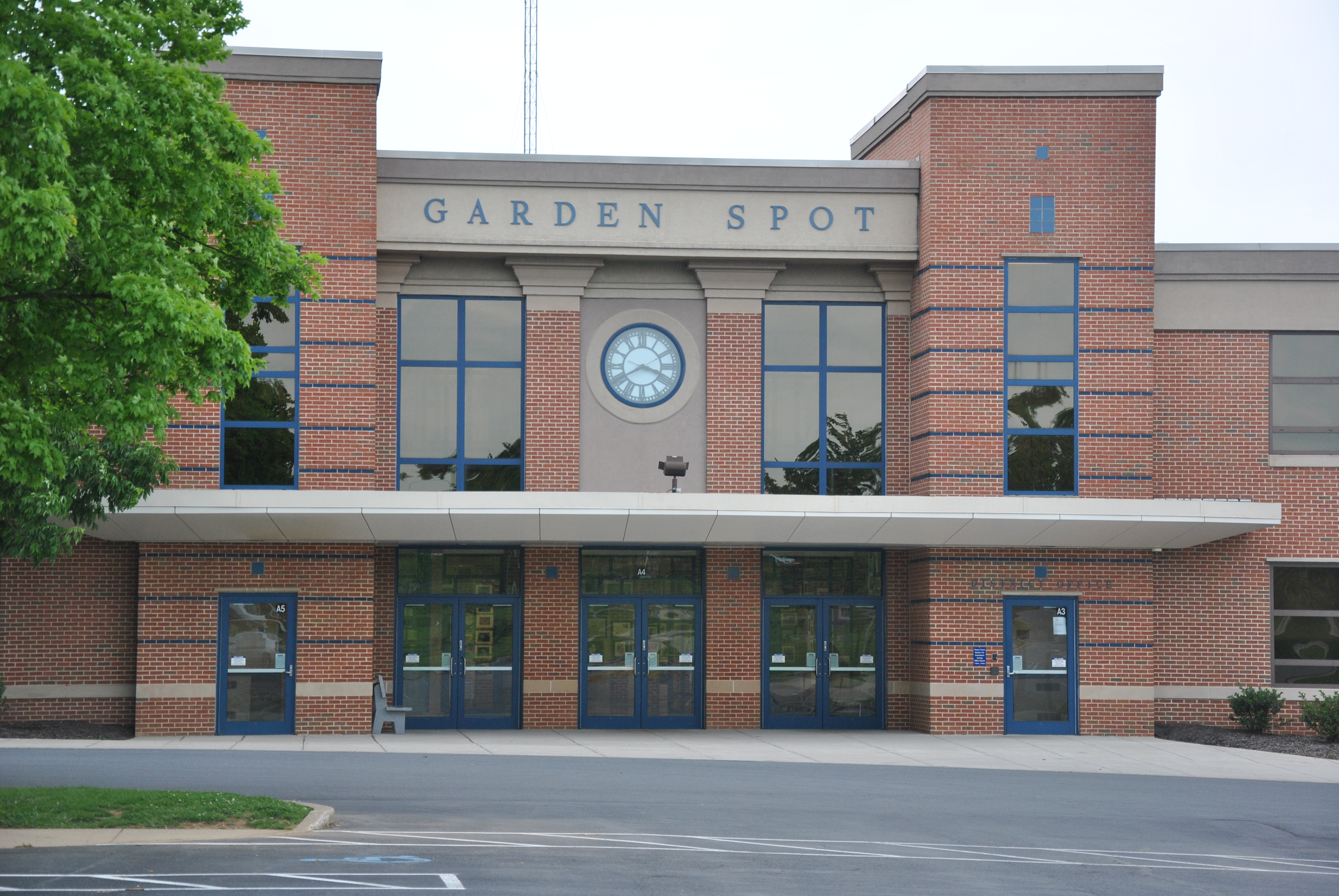
The main entrance to Garden Spot High School and Garden Spot Middle School

- Brecknock Elementary School – Denver, Pennsylvania
- Blue Ball Elementary School – Blue Ball, Pennsylvania
- New Holland Elementary School – New Holland, Pennsylvania
- Garden Spot Middle School – New Holland, Pennsylvania
- Garden Spot Senior High School – New Holland, Pennsylvania
- Caernarvon Elementary – closed in 2008, demolished in 2009
- The old New Holland Elementary School conjoined with Summit Valley, which was renamed New Holland Elementary.
  - The old New Holland Elementary building has been cleared.
