= 1980 AIAW Division I field hockey tournament =

1980 AIAW-USFHA Division I field hockey tournament
Tournament details
- Host country: United States
- City: Carbondale, Illinois
- Teams: 16
- Venue: Southern Illinois University

Final positions
- Champions: Penn State (1st title)
- Runner-up: California
- Third place: Delaware

Tournament statistics
- Matches played: 27
- Goals scored: 86 (3.19 per match)

The 1980 Division I AIAW-USFHA field hockey tournament was the sixth annual single-elimination tournament joint hosted by the Association for Intercollegiate Athletics for Women and the United States Field Hockey Association to determine the national champion of women's collegiate field hockey among their Division I members in the United States, the culmination of the 1980 AIAW Division I field hockey season.

This was the final AIAW Division I tournament before the NCAA introduced its own tournament for its affiliated field hockey programs. As such, this was the final tournament a sixteen-team field.

Penn State won its first AIAW national title, defeating California in the final, 1–0.

The tournament was played at Southern Illinois University in Carbondale, Illinois.

== Bracket ==
=== Championship ===
First round
San Jose State	3
Southern Illinois	1
Davis & Elkins	3
Saint Louis	1
New Hampshire	1
William & Mary	0
California	1
Ursinus	0
Connecticut	3
Old Dominion	2
Delaware	3
Iowa	0
Long Beach State	2
Washington State	0
Miami (OH)	0
Penn State	2

Second round
San Jose State	4
Davis & Elkins	1
New Hampshire	0
California	2
Connecticut	3
Delaware	4 (ps)
Long Beach State	0
Penn State	2

Semifinals
San Jose State	1
California	2**
Delaware	2
Penn State	3*

Championship
California	1
Penn State	2
Third place
San Jose State	2
Delaware	3**

=== Consolation ===
Consolation first round
Old Dominion	1 (ps)
Iowa	0
Washington State	1
Miami (OH)	2
Southern Illinois	1
Saint Louis	2
William & Mary	3
Ursinus	0

Consolation quarterfinals
Old Dominion	4
Davis & Elkins	2
Miami (OH)	0
New Hampshire	1
Saint Louis	1
Connecticut	2
William & Mary	1
Long Beach State	2

Consolation semifinals
Old Dominion	4
New Hampshire	1
Connecticut	2
Long Beach State	1

Fifth place
Old Dominion	2
Connecticut	0

- * indicates an overtime period

== See also ==
- 1980 AIAW Division II field hockey tournament
- 1980 AIAW Division III field hockey tournament
