= Garden Spot High School =

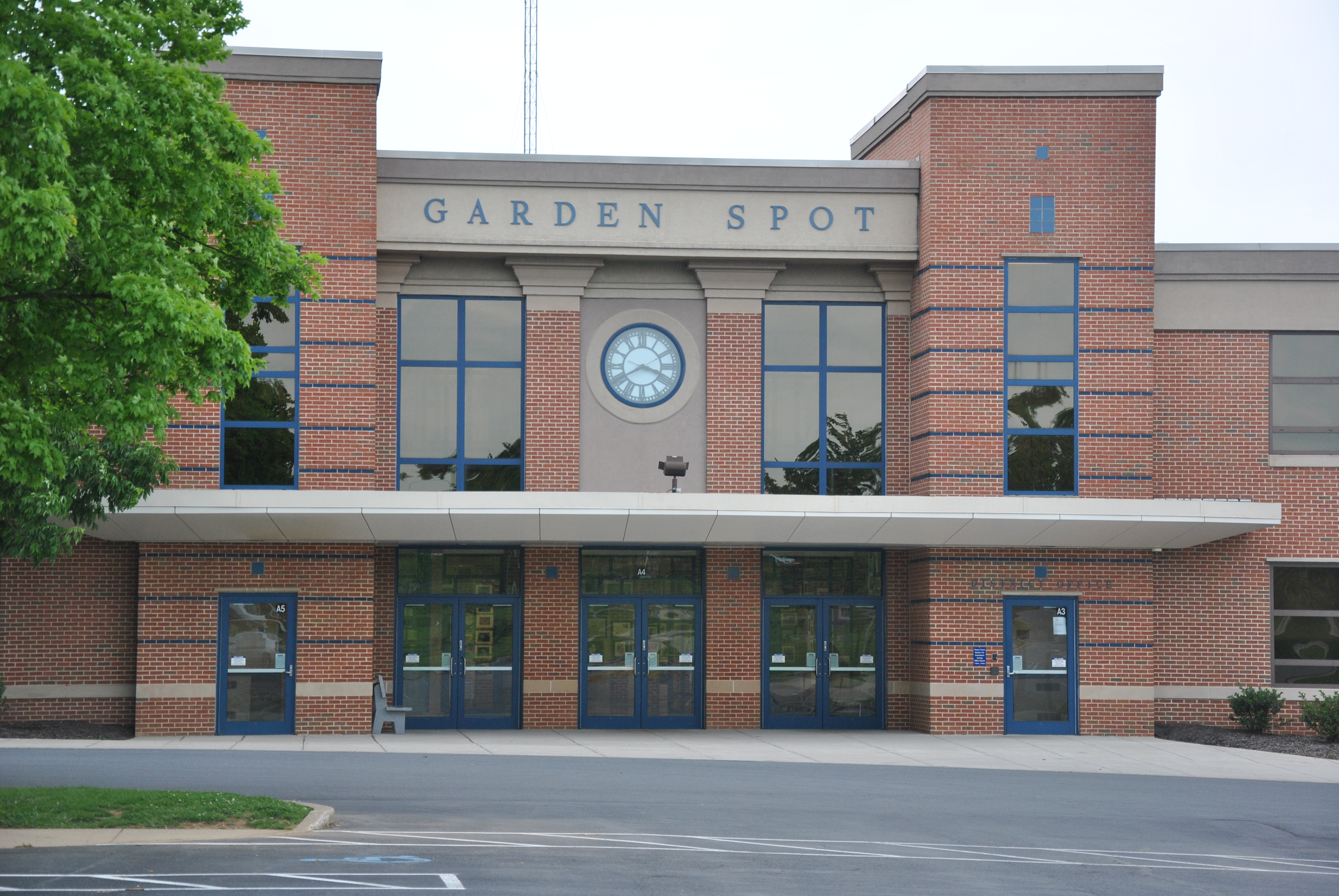
- Garden Spot High School entrance, 2013

Location
- 669 East Main Street; New Holland, Lancaster, Pennsylvania 17557; United States; 40.1109°N 76.0692°W

Information
- School type: Public, Secondary
- Established: 1 September 1954; 72 years ago
- School district: Eastern Lancaster County School District
- Superintendent: Michael Snopkowski
- Principal: Christopher Miller
- Staff: 65.94 (FTE)
- Gender: Co-educational
- Enrollment: 914 (2023–2024)
- Student to teacher ratio: 13.86
- Colors: Blue and gray
- Mascot: Spartans
- Yearbook: Spartanus
- Feeder schools: Garden Spot Middle School
- Website: Garden Spot High School
- Garden Spot Spartan athletic logo

Garden Spot High School is located in New Holland, Lancaster County, Pennsylvania, United States. Founded in 1954, this is the only senior high school in the Eastern Lancaster County School District. It is attached to Garden Spot Middle School, making it easy for those students to go to the high school. It was joined together from six small schools, starting in 1947.

The vestibule of the school building's main entrance contains a functioning reconstructed pendulum mechanism taken from the former New Holland High School's clock tower prior to its demolition.

== Administration ==
The secondary campus principal is Christopher Miller, and the assistant principals are Edalmira Rivera and Zachary Fulmer.

== Extra-curricular activities ==
=== Garden Spot Performing Arts ===
The theater program at Garden Spot High School, known as "Garden Spot Performing Arts," was established in 1967 by Stanley Deen (1937-2016). In recognition of his significant contributions to the arts, the high school’s auditorium was named in his honor following a comprehensive school renovation during the 2010-2011 academic year.

== KGSH ==
KGSH, the television station of Garden Spot High School, provides a morning news program designed to inform students and faculty about upcoming school events, weather conditions, sports updates, and electronic news segments. Initially established as a radio station, KGSH transitioned to an in-house television format in 1991. The station also serves as a comprehensive educational platform where students acquire skills in video editing software to produce original or parodic graphics and opening segments. The operation of KGSH is primarily student-led, with the guidance of a single instructor present during each session, which takes place during the second block of the school day.

=== Orchestra and concert band ===
The Garden Spot High School Orchestra constitutes a symphonic ensemble primarily composed of string instrumentalists selected through a competitive audition process overseen by the director. Wind musicians are chosen based on their performances during auditions for the Garden Spot High School Concert Band. The orchestra presents a holiday concert in December and an end-of-year concert in May, while the Concert Band delivers a concert in February. Musicians from Garden Spot High School consistently participate in county and district orchestra festivals, showcasing their talents and contributing to the broader musical community.

== Sports ==
=== Girls' volleyball ===
The girls' volleyball team have been Lancaster-Lebanon Section 2 Champions in 2006, 2007, 2008, 2010, 2012, 2013, 2015, 2016, 2018, 2019 and 2020. They appeared as Lancaster/Lebanon League finalists in 2007, 2009, 2012, 2013, 2015, 2016, 2018 and 2020; they won the LL League Championship in 2008. They were 2007, 2008 and 2019 PIAA District III AAA semifinalists, 2020 PIAA District III AAA finalists, 2007 PIAA AAA runners-up, 2008 PIAA AAA semifinalists and 2019 PIAA AAA semifinalists.

=== Boys' volleyball ===
The boys volleyball team have been Lancaster-Lebanon Section 2 Champions in 1998, 2000, 2014 and 2021. They appeared as Lancaster/Lebanon League semifinalists in 2014 and 2021. They were 2008 and 2014 District III AA Finalists, 2014 PIAA AA quarterfinalists and 2008 and 2021 PIAA AA semifinalists.

=== Boys' basketball ===
The basketball team won Section 2 Championships from 1999–2001. They won a record 34 straight league games, and were ranked no lower than No. 2 each year in districts. The teams qualified each of those years for the league, district, and state playoffs, and placed second in districts in the 2001 season. Garden Spot boys' basketball star Todd O'Brien went on to play division 1 basketball at Saint Joseph's University and is currently playing professionally overseas.

=== Boys' football ===
The 2008 football team reached the District 3 semi-finals. The previous team to make it past the first round was the 2004 squad. The 2023 football team reached the second playoffs.

=== Boys' soccer ===
The 2002 Lancaster Lebanon League Section 2 soccer team won 14–0, and are the only undefeated soccer team in the school's history.

The 1967 soccer team was 12–1–3, winning the League Championship, the PIAA District 3 Championship and the Inter-District 1–3 Championship (over Ridley Twp. 2–1). There was no state tournament during this era.

== School changes ==
=== Block scheduling ===
GSHS decided to shift to block scheduling beginning in the 2008–2009 school year.

=== Renovations ===
GSHS underwent major renovations in 2010 and 2011. Changes were made to the science wing, family consumer science classrooms (middle and high school), art and visual arts classrooms, cafeteria, performing arts rooms (band, orchestra and chorus), auditorium, library, staircases, health room, and administration and guidance offices (middle and high school). Renovations were also made to the middle school, high school and main entrances. The middle school (the side towards Tower Road) was renovated along with the courtyards in the high school. Outdoors, new bleachers and scoreboard were added, along with a concession stand and restrooms.

== Notable alumni ==
- Todd O'Brien (2007), basketball player who played overseas
