= New Holland, Pennsylvania =

Borough in Pennsylvania, US

New Holland, Pennsylvania Seischwamm (Pennsylvania German)
- Borough
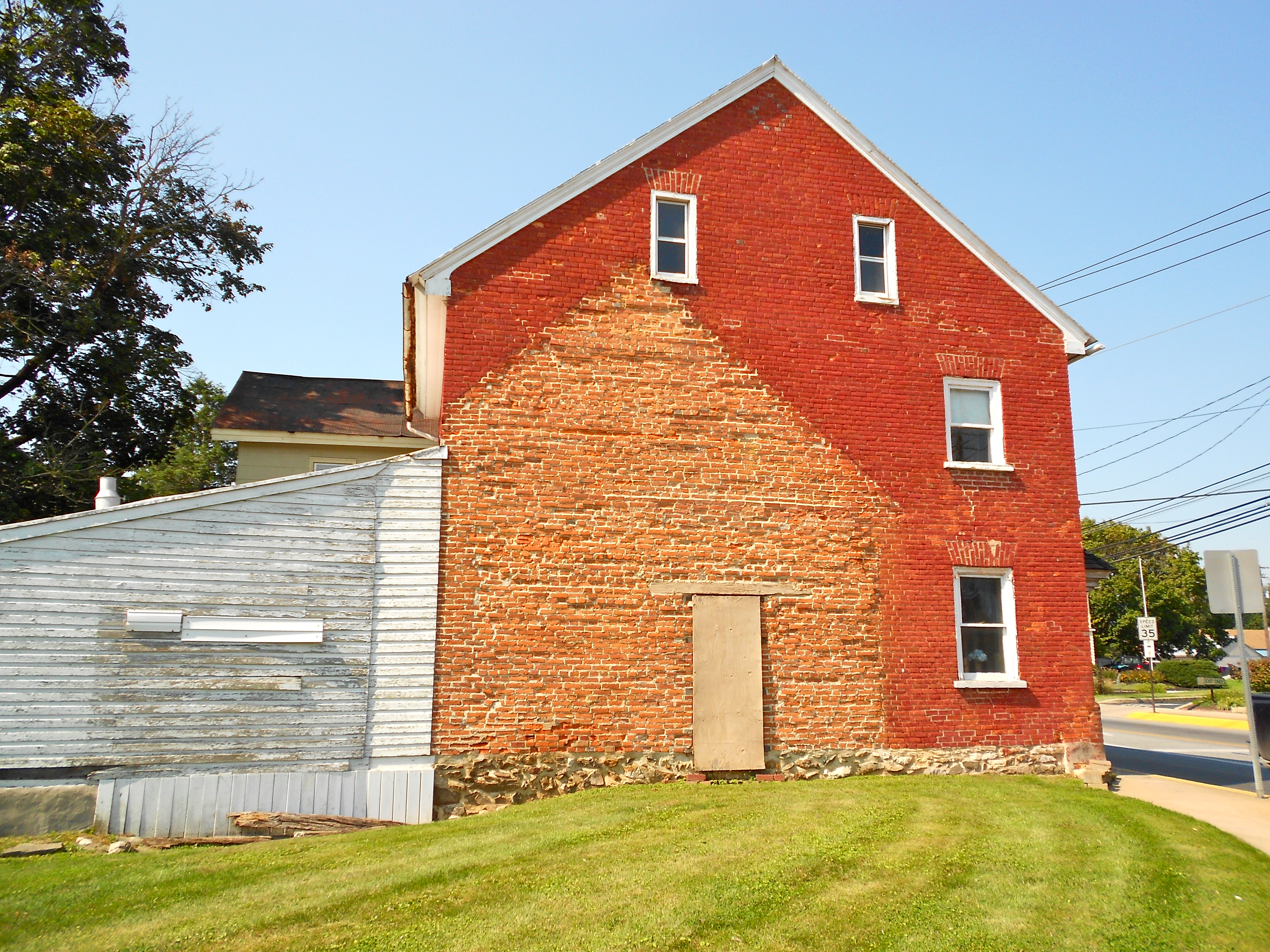
- House on West Main Street
- Etymology: Holland
- Location in Lancaster County, Pennsylvania

- Location in Pennsylvania Location in the United States
- Coordinates: 40°06′08″N 76°05′16″W
- Country: United States
- State: Pennsylvania
- County: Lancaster

Government
  - Mayor: Bryant J. Glick

Area
  - Total: 1.94 sq mi (5.03 km^{2})
  - Land: 1.94 sq mi (5.03 km^{2})
  - Water: 0 sq mi (0.00 km^{2})
- Elevation: 495 ft (151 m)

Population (2020)
  - Total: 5,743
  - Density: 2,955.6/sq mi (1,141.16/km^{2})
- Time zone: UTC−5 (EST)
  - Summer (DST): UTC−4 (EDT)
- ZIP Code: 17557
- Area codes: 717
- FIPS code: 42-53696
- Website: www.newhollandborough.org

New Holland (Pennsylvania German: Seischwamm or Nei Holland) is a borough in Lancaster County, Pennsylvania, United States. As of the 2020 census, the population was 5,762, an increase over the figure of 5,378 tabulated in 2010.

== History ==
New Holland was settled in 1728 by brothers John Michael and John Phillip Ranc (Ranck). Before it became known as New Holland, it had been called "Hog Swamp", "Earltown" and "New Design".

The New Holland Machine Company, which later became New Holland Agriculture, was founded here in 1895 by Abe Zimmerman. New Holland Machine Company is listed alongside John Casper Stoever Log House on the National Register of Historic Places.

New Holland has been the twin city of Longvic, France, since 1967 because there was a Case New Holland plant in the French commune.

== Geography ==
New Holland is located in eastern Lancaster County at 40°6′8″N 76°5′16″W (40.102095, -76.087646). The municipality is an enclave of Earl Township. Pennsylvania Route 23 passes through the borough as Main Street, leading east 11 miles (18 km) to Morgantown and west 14 miles (23 km) to Lancaster, the county seat.

According to the United States Census Bureau, the borough has a total area of 1.9 square miles (4.9 km^{2}), all land. The borough lies on a low ridge, with the north side draining via Groff Creek and other small streams to the Conestoga River and the south side draining to Mill Creek, a westward-flowing tributary of the Conestoga, which flows southwestward to the Susquehanna River.

== Climate ==
According to the Köppen Climate Classification system, New Holland has a humid subtropical climate, abbreviated "Cfa" on climate maps. The hottest temperature recorded in New Holland was 105 °F (40.6 °C) on July 2, 2026, while the coldest temperature recorded was −13 °F (−25.0 °C) on January 19, 1994.

Climate data for New Holland, Pennsylvania, 1991–2020 normals, extremes 1992–present
Month	Jan	Feb	Mar	Apr	May	Jun	Jul	Aug	Sep	Oct	Nov	Dec	Year
Record high °F (°C)	70 (21)	80 (27)	87 (31)	93 (34)	95 (35)	98 (37)	105 (41)	101 (38)	96 (36)	93 (34)	82 (28)	75 (24)	105 (41)
Mean maximum °F (°C)	60.4 (15.8)	60.6 (15.9)	72.7 (22.6)	83.0 (28.3)	89.4 (31.9)	92.9 (33.8)	95.7 (35.4)	92.7 (33.7)	90.3 (32.4)	83.2 (28.4)	71.2 (21.8)	62.7 (17.1)	96.7 (35.9)
Mean daily maximum °F (°C)	38.7 (3.7)	41.6 (5.3)	50.5 (10.3)	63.0 (17.2)	72.9 (22.7)	81.4 (27.4)	85.9 (29.9)	84.3 (29.1)	77.2 (25.1)	65.2 (18.4)	53.6 (12.0)	43.2 (6.2)	63.1 (17.3)
Daily mean °F (°C)	31.1 (−0.5)	33.2 (0.7)	41.2 (5.1)	52.7 (11.5)	62.8 (17.1)	71.5 (21.9)	76.1 (24.5)	74.6 (23.7)	67.4 (19.7)	56.1 (13.4)	45.1 (7.3)	36.0 (2.2)	54.0 (12.2)
Mean daily minimum °F (°C)	23.5 (−4.7)	24.7 (−4.1)	31.9 (−0.1)	42.4 (5.8)	52.7 (11.5)	61.7 (16.5)	66.3 (19.1)	64.8 (18.2)	57.6 (14.2)	47.0 (8.3)	36.5 (2.5)	28.8 (−1.8)	44.8 (7.1)
Mean minimum °F (°C)	6.5 (−14.2)	7.9 (−13.4)	15.6 (−9.1)	27.7 (−2.4)	39.1 (3.9)	48.9 (9.4)	56.3 (13.5)	54.3 (12.4)	44.6 (7.0)	32.1 (0.1)	22.1 (−5.5)	14.9 (−9.5)	3.7 (−15.7)
Record low °F (°C)	−13 (−25)	−2 (−19)	2 (−17)	20 (−7)	28 (−2)	40 (4)	50 (10)	44 (7)	34 (1)	27 (−3)	13 (−11)	2 (−17)	−13 (−25)
Average precipitation inches (mm)	3.34 (85)	2.78 (71)	4.11 (104)	3.56 (90)	3.52 (89)	4.50 (114)	4.43 (113)	4.27 (108)	4.90 (124)	4.56 (116)	3.18 (81)	3.69 (94)	46.84 (1,189)
Average snowfall inches (cm)	10.3 (26)	10.6 (27)	5.5 (14)	1.2 (3.0)	0.0 (0.0)	0.0 (0.0)	0.0 (0.0)	0.0 (0.0)	0.0 (0.0)	0.3 (0.76)	1.0 (2.5)	4.6 (12)	33.5 (85.26)
Average precipitation days (≥ 0.01 in)	12.0	10.1	11.2	11.6	12.8	11.6	11.1	10.1	9.1	9.8	9.1	11.0	129.5
Average snowy days (≥ 0.1 in)	5.5	5.0	2.8	0.6	0.0	0.0	0.0	0.0	0.0	0.0	0.7	2.7	17.3
Source 1: NOAA
Source 2: National Weather Service (mean maxima/minima 2006–2020)

== Rail ==
New Holland is a terminus of the New Holland Secondary rail line, which splits off the Amtrak Keystone Line just east of Lancaster. The line is owned by Norfolk Southern Railway and serves a number of businesses along the way, notably RR Donnelley and Sons Printing in Lancaster, as well as one of the Dart Container factories, and L&S Sweeteners, both in Leola.

== Demographics ==
Historical population
Census	Pop.	Note	%±
1850	672		—
1870	778		—
1880	1,005		29.2%
1890	1,060		5.5%
1900	902		−14.9%
1910	1,106		22.6%
1920	1,453		31.4%
1930	1,725		18.7%
1940	2,153		24.8%
1950	2,602		20.9%
1960	3,425		31.6%
1970	3,971		15.9%
1980	4,147		4.4%
1990	4,484		8.1%
2000	5,092		13.6%
2010	5,378		5.6%
2020	5,743		6.8%
2021 (est.)	5,759	▲	0.3%

As of the census of 2000, there were 5,092 people, 2,084 households, and 1,448 families residing in the borough. The population density was 2,444.2 people per square mile (943.7 people/km^{2}). There were 2,159 housing units at an average density of 1,036.3 per square mile (400.1/km^{2}). The racial makeup of the borough was 90.34% White, 1.02% African American, 0.08% Native American, .025% Asian, 0.02% Pacific Islander, 2.57% from other races, and 1.67% from two or more races. Hispanic or Latino of any race were 6.42% of the population.

The age demographics in the borough are diverse, with 22.4% under the age of 18, 8.1% from 18 to 24, 28.6% from 25 to 44, 24.9% from 45 to 64, and 16.1% who were 65 years of age or older. The median age was 40 years. For every 100 females there were 95.3 males. For every 100 females age 18 and over, there were 94.1 males.

The median income for a household in the borough was $44,446, and the median income for a family was $50,758. Males had a median income of $37,002 versus $25,766 for females. The per capita income for the borough was $20,187. About 3.4% of families and 5.2% of the population were below the poverty line, including 7.5% of those under age 18 and 1.5% of those age 65 or over.

== Public services ==
=== Education ===
The Eastern Lancaster County School District has its district headquarters in New Holland. This site houses Garden Spot High School and Garden Spot Middle School. Elementary schools within the district include New Holland, Blue Ball and Brecknock.

The area is served by the Eastern Lancaster County Library (ELANCO Library), formerly known as New Holland Library. The ELANCO Library is located on Chestnut Drive in New Holland and is a member of the Library System of Lancaster County.

== Culture ==
The New Holland Farmers Fair is an annual festival held in New Holland. Since its inception in 1927, the fair has been held 88 times; due to World War II, the fair was not held from 1941 to 1945. The fair was not held in 2020 due to the COVID-19 pandemic.

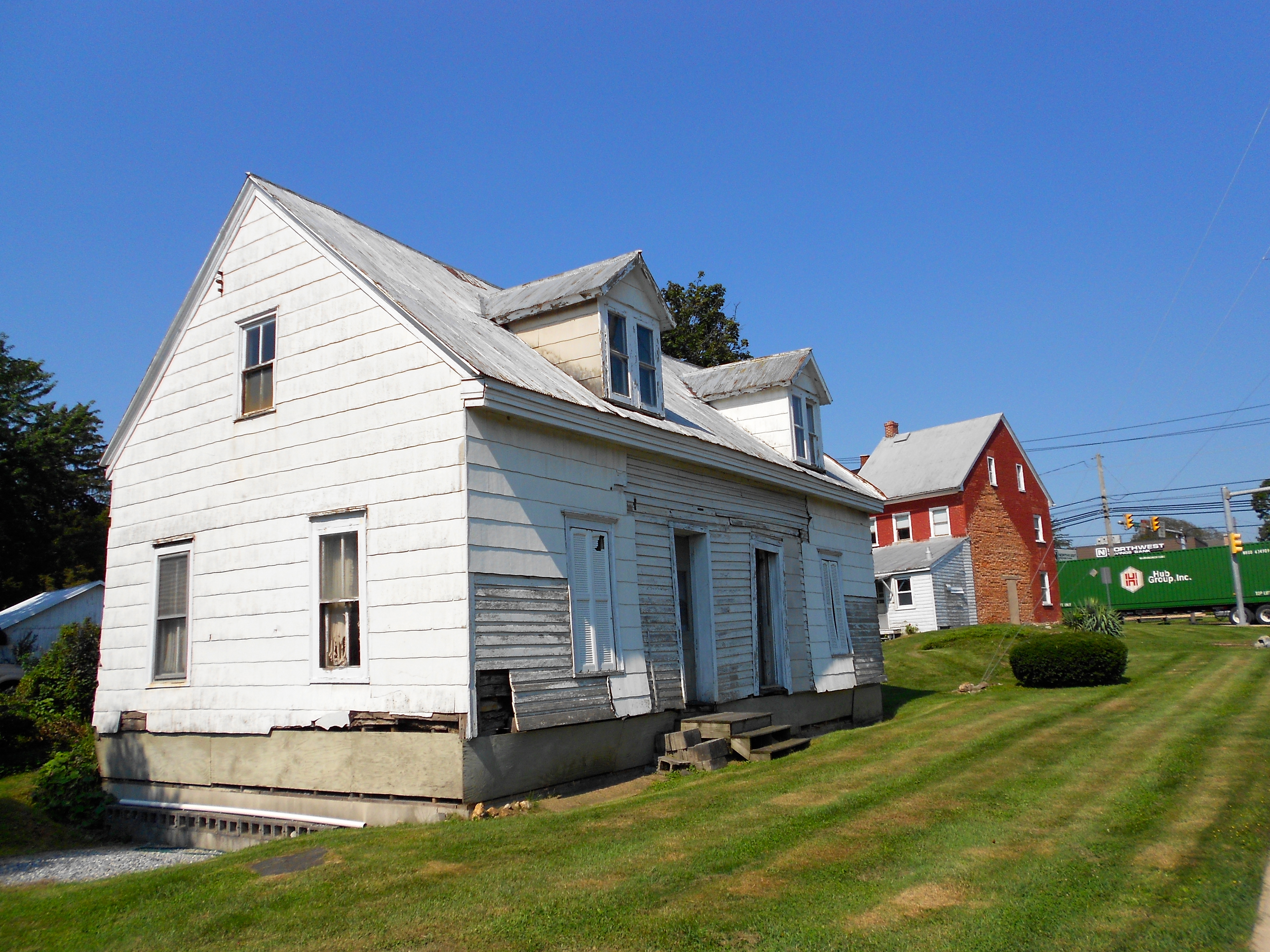
John Casper Stoever Log House

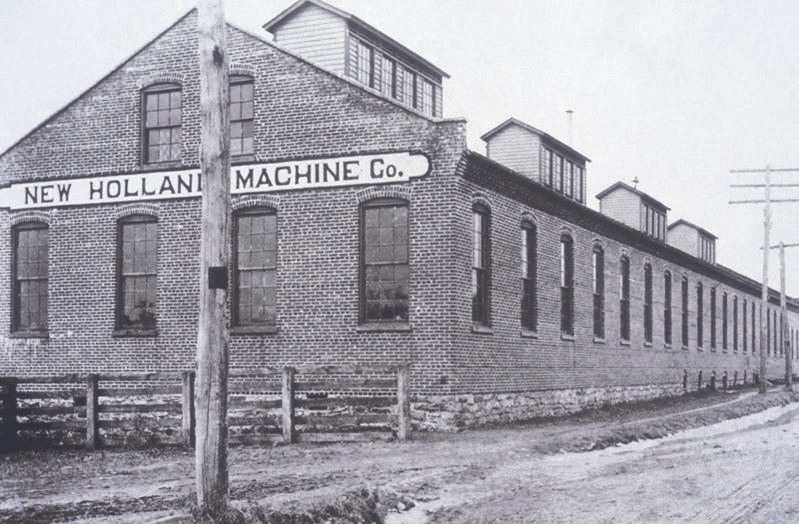
New Holland Machine Company, c. 1895

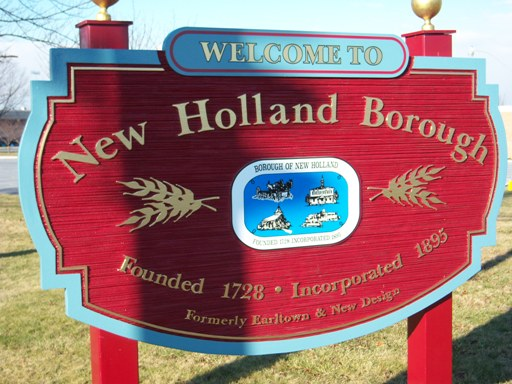
New Holland Borough sign in front of Garden Spot High School

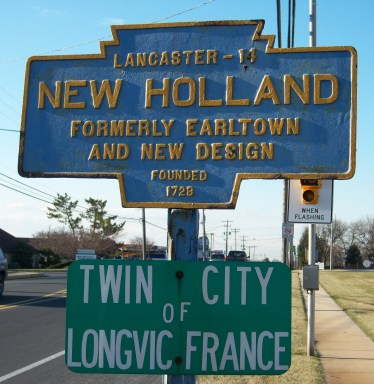
Keystone marker and Sister City sign on Route 23 near Garden Spot High School

== Notable people ==
- John Wesley Davis, former Speaker of the United States House of Representatives
- Todd O'Brien, professional basketball player
- Brenda Stauffer, bronze medal recipient in the 1984 Summer Olympics
- Richard Winters, WWII officer and veteran of D-Day, Market Garden, Carentan and the Battle of the Bulge; main character in Band of Brothers
