= Charlene Morett =

American field hockey player

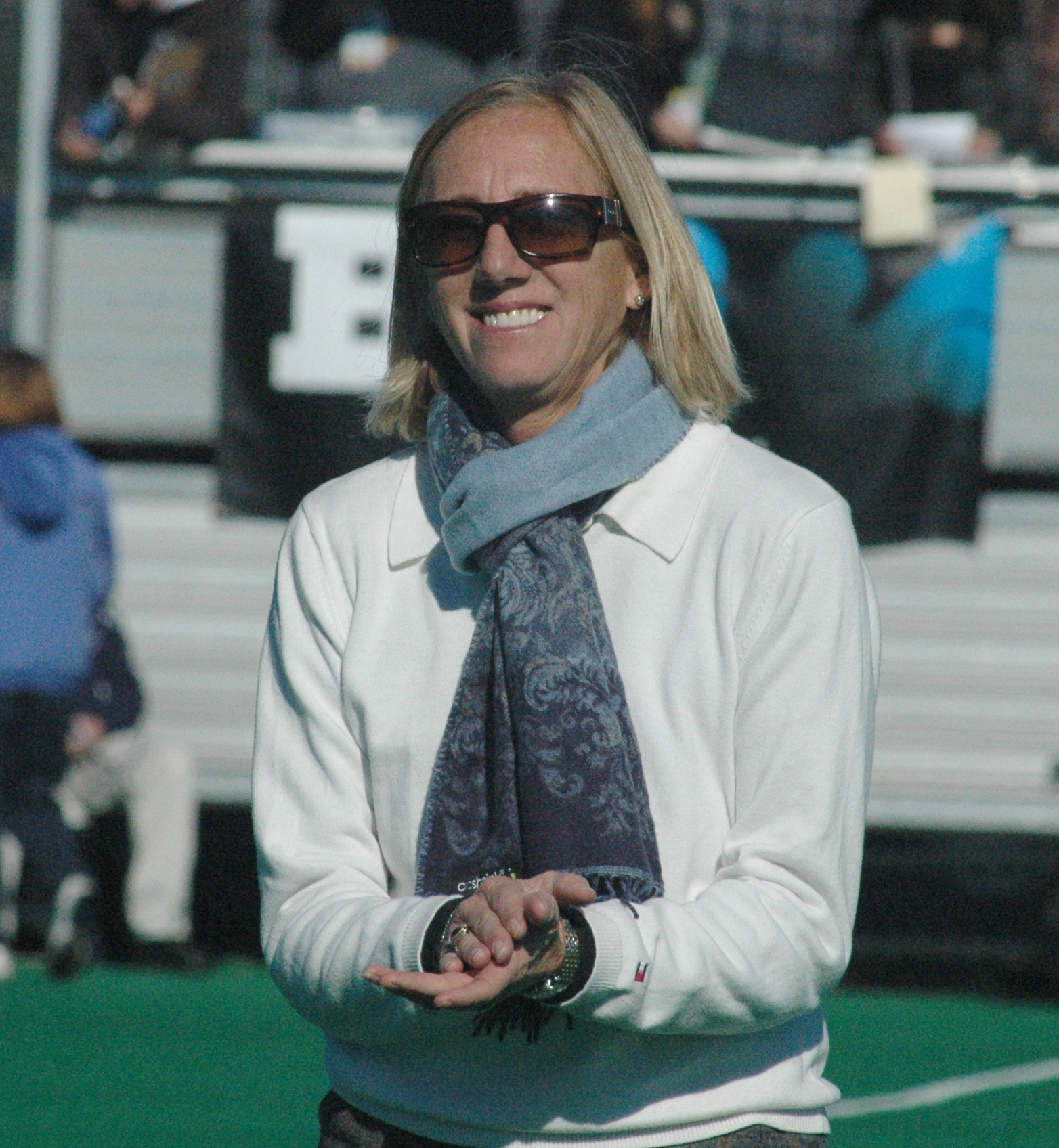
- Penn State Nittany Lions field hockey head coach Charlene Morett in 2011

Personal information
- Born: December 5, 1957 (age 68) Darby, Pennsylvania, U.S.
Medal record
Women's Field Hockey
Representing the United States
Olympic Games
Bronze medal – third place	1984 Los Angeles	Team competition

Charlene Frances "Char" Morett-Curtiss (born December 5, 1957) is a field hockey coach, and former player from the United States. She was a member of the Women's National Team that won the bronze medal at the 1984 Summer Olympics in Los Angeles, California.

== Playing career ==
Morett attended Lansdowne-Aldan High School, before applying to Pennsylvania State University to study physical education. A member of the Nittany Lions field hockey team under coach Gillian Rattray, she became the all-time leading scorer with 50 goals – a record which remained for 21 years. She is the only player from the program to have been selected three times for the All-American first team. Morett was also a member of the United States women's national field hockey team for the 1980 and 1984 Summer Olympics. Unable to compete in 1980 due to the US boycott of the Moscow games, she won a bronze medal with the team four years later in Los Angeles.

== Honors ==
She was inducted into the Pennsylvania Sports Hall of Fame in 2011. As consolation for the 1980 boycott, she was one of 461 athletes to receive a Congressional Gold Medal many years later. Morett has twice been inducted into the USA Field Hockey Hall of Fame, individually in 1989 and as part of the 1984 Olympic team in 2014.

== Coaching career ==
After graduating in 1979, Morett became an assistant field hockey coach at Old Dominion University under coach Beth Anders. In 1984, she took up the position of head coach at Boston College. Morett returned to Pennsylvania State in 1987, succeeding her retiring former coach.

She has since become the longest serving field hockey coach at the college, winning a total of 11 regular season conference titles, including three in the Atlantic 10 Conference and eight in the Big Ten Conference, to go along with nine conference tournament titles, two in the A-10 and seven in the Big Ten. She retired in 2023 after earning a 17-4 record in 2022, winning another Big Ten regular season championship and advancing to the national semifinals that season.

== See also ==
- List of Pennsylvania State University Olympians
