= John Casper Stoever Log House =

Historic house in Pennsylvania, United States

- U.S. National Register of Historic Places
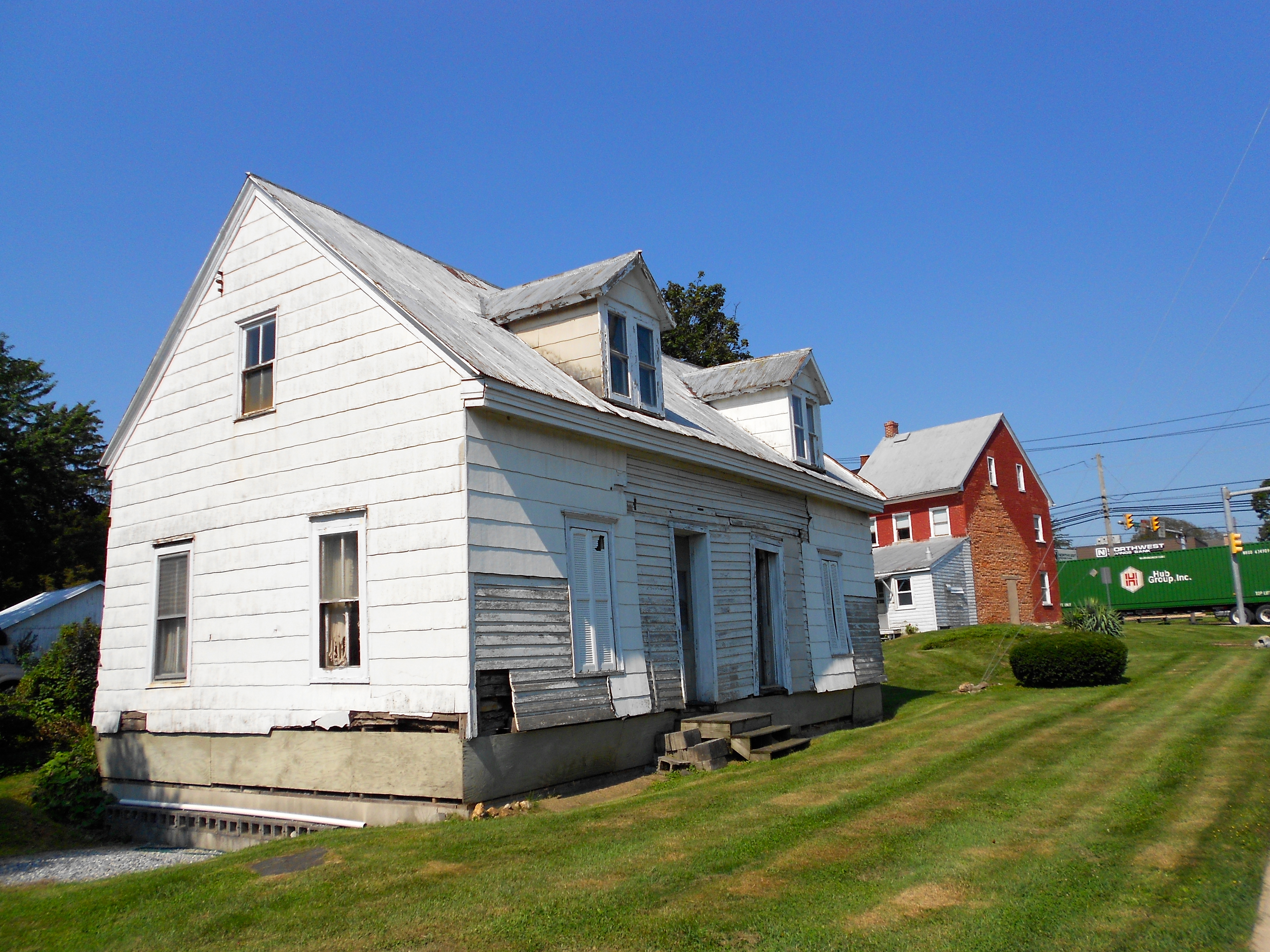
- Photo taken September, 2012

- Location within Pennsylvania Location within the United States
- Location: 200 W. Main St., New Holland, Pennsylvania
- Coordinates: 40°6′4″N 76°5′33″W
- Area: 0.3 acres (0.12 ha)
- Built: c. 1740
- Architectural style: Corner posted log building
- NRHP reference No.: 86003561
- Added to NRHP: January 6, 1987

The John Casper Stoever Log House is an historic home that is located in New Holland, Lancaster County, Pennsylvania, United States.

It was listed on the National Register of Historic Places in 1987.

== History and architectural features ==
Built circa 1740, this historic structure is a 1 1/2-story, log dwelling that measures thirty-six feet, six inches by twenty-two feet. It has corner posts, to which the logs are attached with mortise and tenon joints. Featuring a gable roof with dormers, it was originally erected on a stone foundation. The log structure was covered with asbestos shingles over novelty siding. A one-story, rear addition was built during the 1880s and a glass entryway was added during the 1920s. Its builder, Rev. John Casper Stoever (1707–1779), was a prominent figure in the development of the Lutheran church.

The house is no longer located at 200 West Main Street, and appears to have been moved about thirty feet south and turned ninety degrees.

== Gallery ==
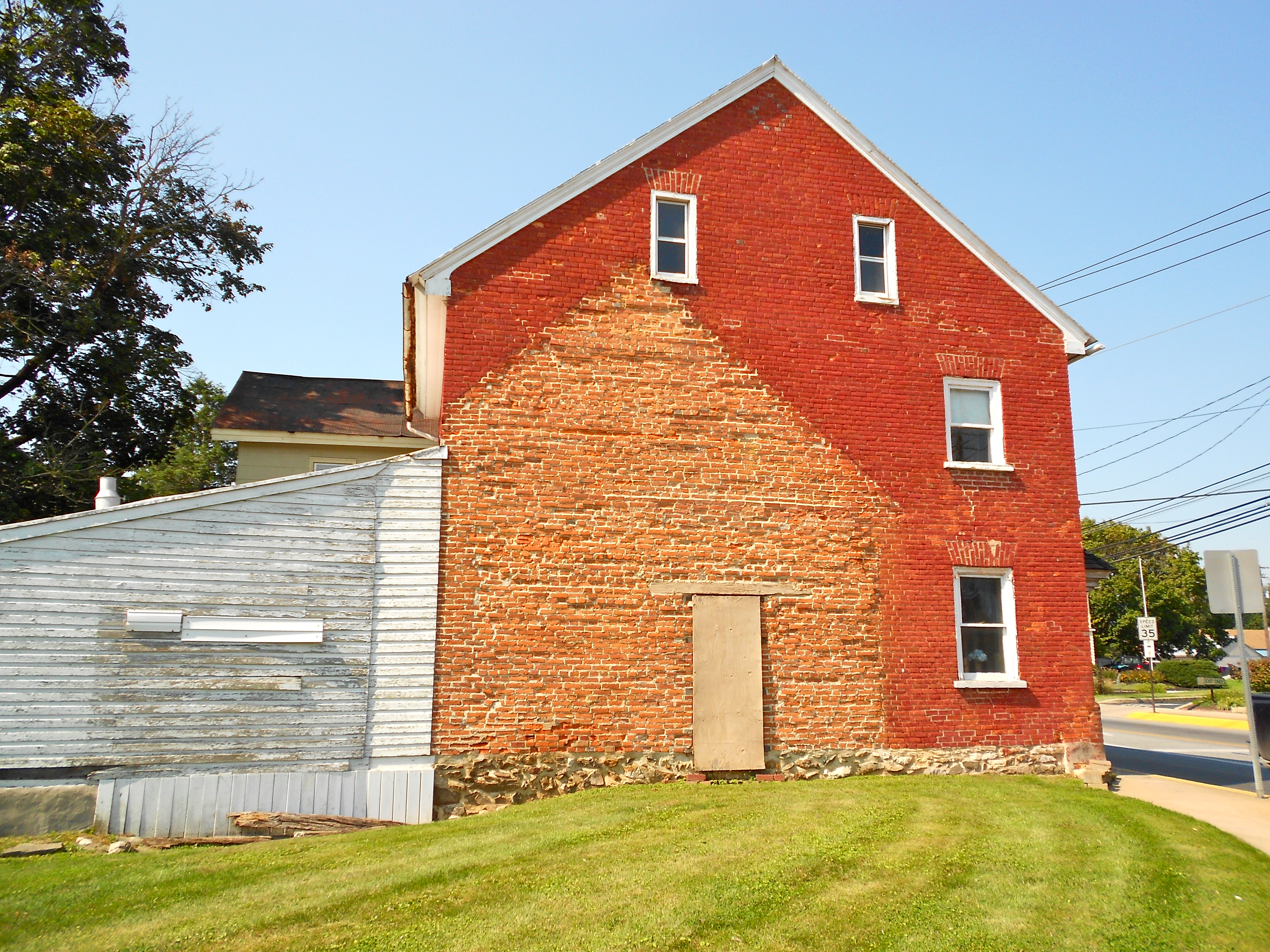
The house's "shadow" on the building at 204 W. Main

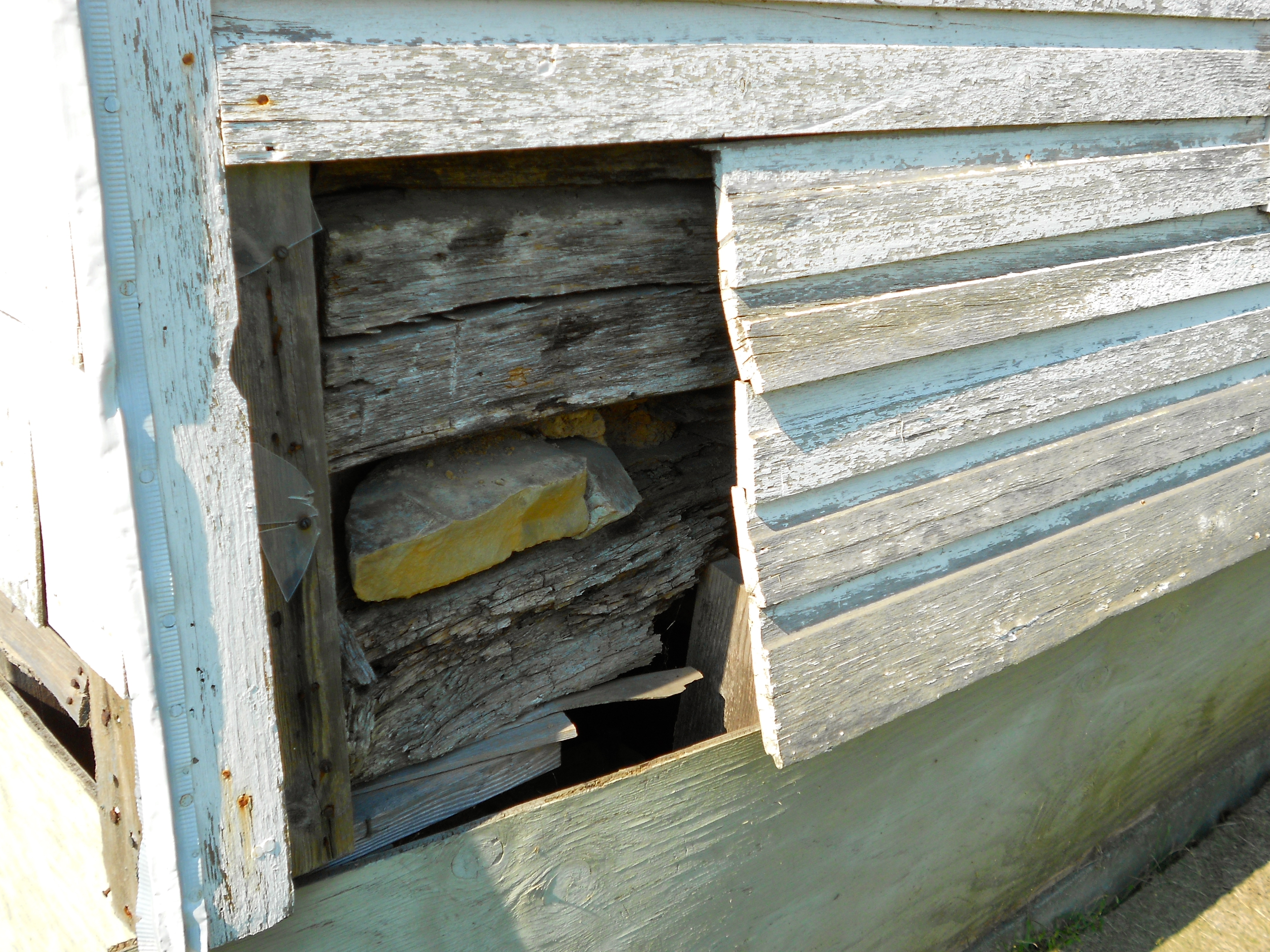
Log structure beneath the siding

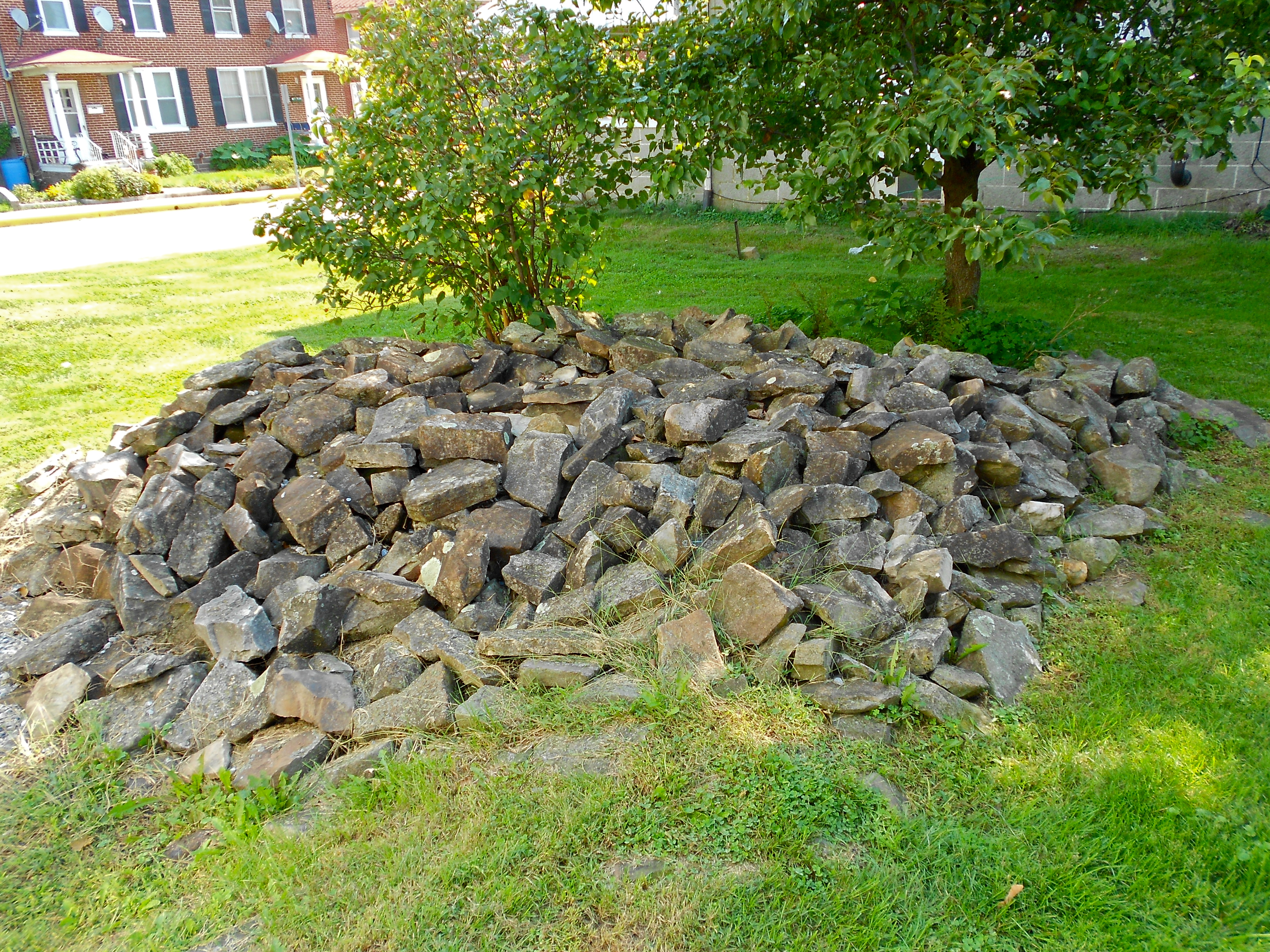
Foundation stones lying beside the moved building
