= New Holland Machine Company =

- U.S. National Register of Historic Places
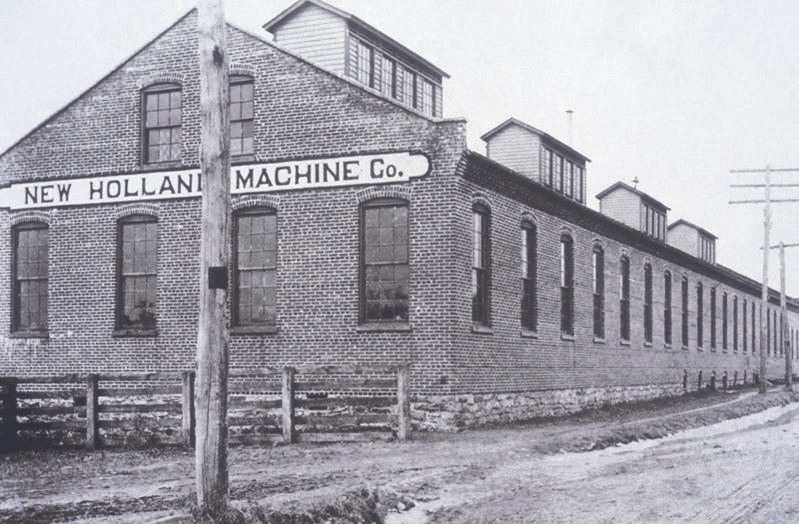
- New Holland Machine Company building, c. 1895

- Location within Pennsylvania Location within the United States
- Location: 146 E. Franklin St., New Holland, Pennsylvania, U.S.
- Coordinates: 40°6′3″N 76°5′19″W
- Area: 1.7 acres (0.69 ha)
- NRHP reference No.: 00000846
- Added to NRHP: August 9, 2000

The New Holland Machine Company was founded in 1895, when an American young man by the name of Abram Zimmerman purchased a horse barn in New Holland, Pennsylvania, and established a blacksmith shop. Zimmerman was the third of seven children born to the Martin W. and Anna (Martin) Zimmerman. The Zimmermans were a very conservative Mennonite family. Abram Zimmerman was a mechanical genius who brought his talents to bear in the new blacksmith business as he began repairing and making farm machinery for the local farmers.

It was listed on the National Register of Historic Places in 2000.

== Historic building ==
The New Holland Machine Company building located at 146 E. Franklin St. in New Holland, was built in eight sections between 1903 and 1952. It is a two-story, irregularly shaped, evolutionary industrial brick building. The facility closed in 1992.

== Otto and Columbus engines ==
Abram Zimmerman began retailing the German Otto four-cycle engine as part of his new business. The Otto was a single-cylinder dual flywheel stationary engine which was manufactured in Philadelphia. After a short while of selling the Otto, Abe Zimmerman switched to selling another single-cylinder dual-flywheel stationary engine called the Columbus. Retailing these engines added income to the Zimmerman blacksmith shop. By 1896, the Zimmerman blacksmith was employing three employees. However, Zimmerman's innovative nature soon had developed a "better idea".

== "Freeze-proof" engine ==
Zimmerman thought that he could build and manufacture his own stationary engine which would be lighter in weight and would be easier to repair and operate. By 1900, he had designed his own stationary engine and built prototypes of the engine.

=== Water cooling ===
Like most stationary engines of the time, Zimmerman's new engine was water-cooled - a jacket around the cylinder was filled with water to keep the engine cool while the engine was in use. Generally, the water evaporated as the engine was operated and more water had to be added to the water jacket of the typical engine throughout the day.

=== Risk of freezing ===
In the wintertime, the water jacket had to be drained of water when the farmer was through working with the engine. If not drained, the water would freeze in the water jacket, the ice would expand when freezing and this expansion would crack the cast iron engine.

=== Zimmerman's solution ===
One of the innovations incorporated into Zimmerman's new engine was that the water jacket was shaped like a bowl and was larger at the top than at the bottom. If water were left in the bowl-shaped water jacket of this new engine during a cold winter's night, the ice could expand harmlessly upwards and outwards without cracking the castings of the cylinder or engine. Thus, because of this bowl-shaped water jacket, Zimmerman's new engine was "freeze-proof."

== Incorporation ==
With prototypes of his new engine completed, Zimmerman, now wished to manufacture and sell his new engine. To do this he needed to incorporate and take on some new investors. Accordingly, Zimmerman raised $50,000 by selling 500 shares in the new company to his neighbors. Thus, in 1903, the New Holland Machine Company was born.

Zimmerman was selected chief executive of the new company. With this new capital, the company acquired a brick factory on Franklin Street in the city of New Holland and hired on 40 employees to mass-produce the new stationary engine.

== Engine range ==
Eventually, six different horsepower (hp) models of the New Holland stationary engine were mass-produced by the New Holland Company. These six models started with the little ½ hp engine and ranged upwards to a 5 hp model. The most popular seller among the line of stationary engines offered by New Holland was the 5 hp model. By 1911, sales of the 5 hp model New Holland stationary engine were up more than 253% over sales of the same engine in 1904.

1/2HP, 1 1/2HP, 2HP, 3HP, 4HP, 5HP

== Expansion ==
Success attended the company from the very beginning. In its first annual report dated March 29, 1904, the company was able to report profits of $1,859.40 following its very first year of incorporation. Success in selling the stationary engines, led the New Holland Machine Company to expand into the manufacture of other farm machine products.

=== Feed grinder ===
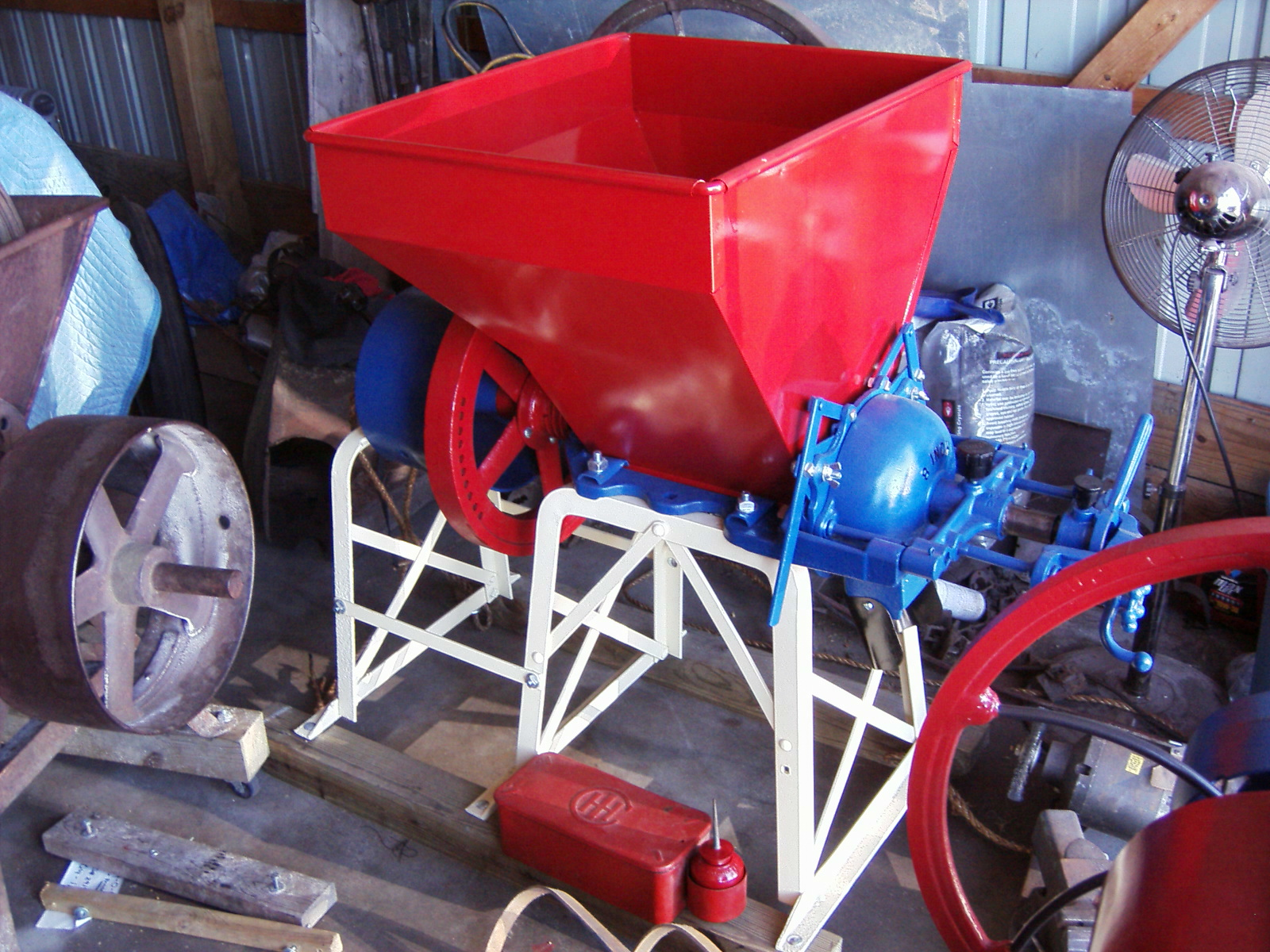
A feed grinder

As early as November 1899, even before the company had been incorporated, Abe Zimmerman's blacksmith shop had been advertising a feed grinder of his own design. This "feed and cob mill" had a capacity of 10 to 30 bushels of feed per hour and was being offered to the farming public for $15.00.

Later, after incorporation, the New Holland Machine Company sold these feed grinders with the option of being mounted on a wooden or steel truck and also with the option of having one of the four larger New Holland engines (4 hp through the 16 hp models) mounted on the truck together with the feed grinder. In this way the feed grinder and engine would form a single unit which could easily be moved around the farm.

=== Rock crusher and wood saw ===
Following incorporation, other machines had been added to the line of New Holland machinery. In 1912, the company began manufacturing its own rock crusher and, by 1914, the New Holland Machine Company had also added a wood saw to its line of farm machinery. By 1911, the company had 150 employees. By 1927, the number of employees at the company had risen to 225.

== Sale to Sperry ==
The New Holland Machine Company was purchased by the Sperry Corporation in 1947, to form Sperry-New Holland. For the subsequent history see New Holland Agriculture.
