= Brenda Stauffer =

American field hockey player

Personal information
- Born: April 8, 1961 (age 65) New Holland, Pennsylvania, U.S.
Medal record
Women's Field Hockey
Representing the United States
Olympic Games
Bronze medal – third place	1984 Los Angeles	Team competition

Brenda Lee Stauffer (born April 8, 1961 in New Holland, Pennsylvania) is a former field hockey player from the United States. She was a member of the United States bronze medal winning team at the 1984 Summer Olympics in Los Angeles, California. Brenda played field hockey at Pennsylvania State University making "collegiate player of the year" in 1982.

== See also ==
- List of Pennsylvania State University Olympians
