= Dittigheim =

- Stadtteil of Tauberbischofsheim
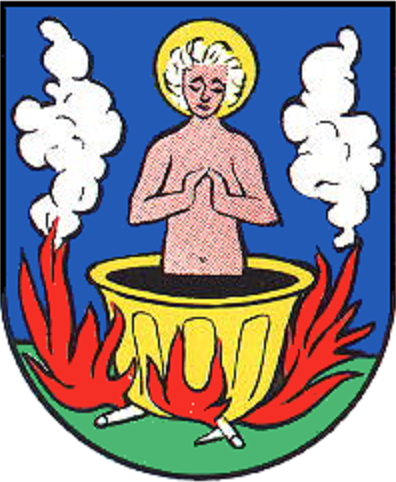
- Coat of arms
- Interactive map of Dittigheim
- Location within Germany Location within Baden-Württemberg
- Coordinates: 49°36′39″N 09°40′28″E
- Country: Germany
- State: Baden-Württemberg
- District: Main-Tauber-Kreis
- Town: Tauberbischofsheim
- Time zone: UTC+01:00 (CET)
  - Summer (DST): UTC+02:00 (CEST)
- Postal codes: 97941
- Dialling codes: 09341
- Vehicle registration: TBB

Dittigheim is a district of Tauberbischofsheim with 915 residents.

== Geography ==
Dittigheim is located south-east of Tauberbischofsheim in the Tauberfranken region of Franconia.

== History ==
Dittigheim is one of seven districts of Tauberbischofsheim. The other districts are the town of Tauberbischofsheim, as well as Dienstadt, Distelhausen, Dittwar, Hochhausen and Impfingen.

Dittigheim was incorporated to Tauberbischofsheim during the local government reform in Baden-Württemberg on January 1, 1975.
