= Hochhausen (Tauberbischofsheim) =

- Stadtteil of Tauberbischofsheim
- Interactive map of Hochhausen
- Location within Germany Location within Baden-Württemberg
- Coordinates: 49.6621°N 9.6353°E
- Country: Germany
- State: Baden-Württemberg
- District: Main-Tauber-Kreis
- Town: Tauberbischofsheim
- Time zone: UTC+01:00 (CET)
  - Summer (DST): UTC+02:00 (CEST)
- Postal codes: 97941
- Dialling codes: 09341
- Vehicle registration: TBB

Hochhausen is a district of Tauberbischofsheim with 712 residents.

== Geography ==
Hochhausen is located north-northwest of Tauberbischofsheim in the Tauberfranken region of Franconia.

== History ==
Hochhausen is one of seven districts of Tauberbischofsheim. The other districts are the town of Tauberbischofsheim, as well as Dienstadt, Distelhausen, Dittigheim, Dittwar and Impfingen.

Hochhausen was incorporated to Tauberbischofsheim during the local government reform in Baden-Württemberg on January 1, 1971.
