= Reicholzheim =

Coordinates: 49°44′N 9°32′E

Reicholzheim is a district of Wertheim am Main in Germany. It is located in the Tauber valley at the foothills of the Odenwald and the quiet forests of the Spessart on the banks of the Tauber river near the mouth of the Tauber into the Main river. Reicholzheim had 1,450 inhabitants in 2003.

== Description and location ==
It is located in the state of Baden-Württemberg near the most northern point of that state. Located in the beautiful Tauber Valley in a historical area between the picturesque old town of Wertheim and the monastery of Bronnbach. Reicholzheim is part of the Franconian region of Baden-Württemberg and became a part of Baden only through political manoeuvres in 1806. The landscape of Tauber Franconia has been split since that time between Bavaria and Baden.

== History ==
=== Early history ===
"All indications suggest Reicholzheim was a community by the 8th and 9th Century", according to Reicholzheim - Ältestes Dorf im unteren Taubertal by Dr. Paul Benz, 1984 (written in German). It may be that Reicholzheim is even older because excavations show evidence that dates back to the 5th century AD.

Reicholzheim is first mentioned in a document of 1178 as Richolfsheim. Bishop Reinhard von Würzburg confirms that the Cistercian abbey Bronnbach lies in the area of the Parish of Reicholzheim. Reicholzheim received the place name either from the knight Richolt or from Richulf, the Archbishop of Mainz (in office 787-813).

=== Reicholzheim in the Middle Ages ===
In the Middle Ages Reicholzheim had different names: Reicholtsheim, Reichelsheim, Richolfsheim and Richolvesheim. The village then belonged to the land of the count of Wertheim. In 1369 Reicholzheim became part of the lands of the monastery in Bronnbach. There were three other villages beside Reicholzheim that also belonged to Bronnbach.

Reicholzheim was

- 1573–1622 Catholic
- 1622–1628 Lutheran
- 1628–1631 Catholic
- 1631–1634 Lutheran
- 1635–1647 Catholic
- 1648–1674 Lutheran
- 1674–1803 Catholic

The first entry in the baptisimal book of recatholized Reicholzheim is from April 25, 1674. Today the majority of people in Reicholzheim remain Catholic.

In the 12th century the village was subordinated to the county village of the Wertheimer count. After the establishment of the monastery at Bronnbach in the year 1151 Reicholzheim is mentioned as a monastery village. Thus everything in Reicholzeim belongs to the monastery Bronnbach in the year 1285 of count Rudolf. By the sales of the road court in the 1369 also the last right of the Wertheimer count turned everything into the monastery Bronnbach, so that Reicholzheim was now fully subordinate to the monastery of Bronnbach. During the reformation in 1524, Reicholzheim ignored the Reicholzheimer, for 150 years again in came into the possession of the count in Wertheim and thus began an alternation of denomination from Catholic to Evangelist 7 times. Thus the sovereignty over Reicholzheim in the Middle Ages changed again and again between the count von Wertheim and the monastery Bronnbach that to the diocese of Wuerzburg. The lay administration offices of the monastery were accommodated, so e.g. in Reicholzheim the tax collection place of the Wuerzburg diocese. Starting from the 16th century the viticulture of Reicholzheim was of great importance. This was above all the Bronnbachern monks doing, which affected the culture of the village in religious and mental regard. Thus the monastery promoted the viticulture and the agriculture in Reicholzheim and operated in addition in Bronnbach a brewery, brennerei and a mill.

=== Reicholzheim in the 19th and 20th centuries ===
Reicholzheim belonged until 1803 to the (Zisterzienser) monastery of Bronnbach. This was the feudal system and all inhabitants had to work for the feudal lords. The monks as other village people had to work for their aristocratic masters. Bronnbach which is and was just to the south of Reicholzheim had under its rule at least three other villages. Bronnbach is still existence today, and has a huge ancient castle-like monastery, now home of a big historical archive of Baden. Bronnbach itself belonged at a certain time to the Bistum of Wuerzburg, which was a big and important "state?" in Germany at that time. Also there was a big rivalry between Bistum of Wuerzburg and the Bistum of Mainz. Mainz was very active in the area and had some influence in Bronnbach. Beside these church states and areas the very small place of Wertheim which was to the north, reigned by a Count, This political administration played a role, but never regained control over Bronnbach and Reicholzheim after the loss of the villages in Thirty Year War. In 1803 the Old German Reich ceased to exist, the church states were extinguished, and Wertheim and Reicholzheim after three years of interregnum both came to the grand duke of Baden.

Up to 1927 the village had had only ten wells, which then were replaced by a modern water supply system. From the 1950s to 1970s, the agricultural character of the village changed into a more and more industrially structured area. In 1951 the wine-growers-cooperative was founded. The vineyards of Reicholzheim are about 25 hectares and feature Tauberfranken wines.

== Objects of interest ==
Reicholzheim possesses several objects of interest, under it also the largest stone cross collection in Germany and is a place of cultivation of wine in the Tauber Valley.

=== Stone cross collection ===
The stone cross collection in Reicholzheim is the largest well-known accumulation of stone cross collection of Germany with 14 stone crosses, which are from sandstone, The crosses are embedded in a red sandstone retaining wall, on the old road way between Reicholzheim and Bronnbach. Eight of the stone crosses are engraved with different indications / symbols: Swords, Dolchmesser, hammer, Lillie and a jug or a port up. Beside the stone crosses a bildstock (prayer column) is from the year 1722.

Around the stone cross collection the following legend has come about.: a beautiful girl is to have been killed near the roadway, the boy that killed her survived, he went to Gamburg, where he killed himself. His family had the cross made to prevent a bloody revenge from the family of the girl.

Historically the stone crosses were from different places in Reicholzheim, they were gathered and were then set up and the wall built. In a village order of 1494 the stone crosses are first mentioned, so that it may be assumed, that at this time already a first accumulation of crosses were to be found there. Generally the stone crosses are from between the 14th and 16th centuries.

=== Saint George Catholic Church ===
The Catholic Church in Reicholzheim The old Church of St. George was probably established 1673 or 1674. Tho it is reported that Reicholzheim was Catholic as early as 1573. In 1711 the church of Reicholzheim was established under the Abbot of Joseph Hartmann in the years 1711 -1713. (The Abbot of the Church was likely selected by the Monks at Bronnbach)?. The builder was Johann Josef GREISING of Wu(e)rzburg. In the year 1903 the building was extended under the Priest Martin Noe and 43 meter, high, church tower was built. The baroque altars were built by master carpenter, Balthasar Esterbauer of Wu(e)rzburg, and they are particularly worth seeing. Also on the west side of the Church statues of St. George, made by Sculptor Johann Thomas MUELLER of Freudenberg Also a "Bildstock" or praying column which contains an image of a holy figure. The Bildstocks are registered usually in maps, and so that represents an important orienting point. Very common in areas like Franconia and Swabia. Reicholzheim was from 1573 - 1622 Catholic 1622 - 1628 Evangelist 1628 - 1631 Catholic 1631 - 1634 Evangelist 1635 - 1647 Catholic 1648 - 1674 Evangelist 1674 - today the majority of people in Reicholzheim are Catholic. That is because Reicholzheim belonged either alternating to the monastery Bronnbach (Roman Catholic) or to the counts von Wertheim (Evangelical ) The first entry in the oldest baptizing book of St. Georg, Catholic Church in Reicholzheim built in 1673, comes from 25.4.1674.

=== Chapel and the war memorial ===
The Dreifaltigkeits Chapel was established to 1893–1894 by Adam Umert with the assistance of several village inhabitants and stands exactly next to the war memorial on the mountain, from which one can grasp the whole village. The chapel is built from the red sandstone found in Reicholzheim. The war memorial makes a wonderful view on the place and the Tauber Valley from Reicholzheim. In 1932 under the direction of the Krieger Kamerad Schaft, the War Memorial was built with two engraved red sandstone boards standing with the names of the people from Reicholzheim who died in World War I and World War II.

== Public mechanisms and village lives ==
Reicholzheim possesses a primary school (primary school Reicholzheim) and a kindergarten, a community center, in which the local administration, a general physician and a fire-brigade are accommodated. Reicholzheim possesses a festival hall, in which has a capacity of 500 people; also it possesses two sports fields with 100 m course and far jump course and a race course. Reicholzheim has several associations, Sportverein (VfB Reicholzheim), Faschingsverein (RNC Reicholzheim), An association for local history There is a history club (Heimatverein) in Reicholzheim,

There are two local history books Paul Benz's book Reicholzheim - �ltestes Dorf im unteren Taubertal (1984), and Reicholzheim- Blut und Boden (1938) by Fridolin Bischof.

A fishing rod association, a Gesangsverein (Saengerkranz Reicholzheim) Motorsportclub (MSC Reicholzheim). There are several association celebrations due to the high number of associations. The most important meetings are: The carnival stranger meetings of the RNCs, The wine celebration, with which there are regional wines auto+free Sunday, every 2 years in the lower Tauber Valley to 2. Sunday in August in Reicholzheim with a celebration involved. Weihnachtsmarkt, with which there are regional products to buy.

== Nearby ==
In the forests of Reicholzheim, there are mainly oak trees, beech trees, Douglas fir and black pine trees. All together there are more than 30 different kinds of tree. Also rare kinds, such as "Speierling", which is a type of a wild apple tree, that is used for making apple cider. And very old types of wild fruits are found as well. About half of the forest retains softwood, the other half hardwood. There are about 5,598 acres (23 km^{2}) of forest that belong to Reicholzheim. Woods with approximately 126,000 trees. The oak trees are up to 160 years old, and the oldest pine trees are 140 years old.

Tauber Bridge Reicholzheim/ Tauberbrücke Reicholzheim was completed in 1772. It is located Reicholzheim, Wertheim, Main-Tauber-Kreis, Baden-Württemberg, Germany. It is an "Arch Road" bridge made of stone. The dimensions of the spans are 6.048 m - 8.658 m - 6.346 m - 5.318 m.

Also interesting is the newly built observatory.

== Economics ==
Reicholzheim has several company enterprises among them:

- Oxygen work Friedrich Gutroff GmbH, which manufacture industrial gases and oxygen.
- TFA Dostmann, which manufacture thermometers and digital weather stations
- PRACTICE GmbH & PRACTICE Medical GmbH, which fiber thermometer and blood pressure apparatuses manufacturer

Beyond that also tourism became a crucial factor of the economy in Reicholzheim, which increased lovely Tauber valley "by the wheel drive" in the last years having increased. Reicholzheim also has some glass blowing enterprises, a furniture factory and the winegrowers' co-operative. Reicholzheim also has a branch office to the area winegrowers' co-operative Franconia (GWF). (39 wines, - 5 current an excellent wine grows here, too. The best known is a strong wine called Bocksbeutel, grown in the area of Reicholzheim. A very good vineyard, located in the northern Baden village of Reicholzheim grows some smart, deeply flavored Silvaner.

== People of Recholzheim ==
Data concerning population 1850 about 900; 1946 about 1600; 1984 about 1500; February 1, 2003: exactly 1455 among those live 58 peoples from foreign countries

The name Amend (also Amenth and Amendt) Dorbath, Matzer and Trabold belongs for centuries to the most frequent names in Reicholzheim.

In 1680 the mayor was Hans Hans-Joerg Amendt.

== Sources ==
Research information For Reicholzheim

- Parish register of Reicholzheim Church of St. Georg,
- Baptisms Records of Reicholzheim Church of St. Georg,
- Marriages Records of Reicholzheim Church of St. Georg,
- Deaths Records of Reicholzheim Church of St. Georg,
- Family book: By Padre Benard Schierstein and Reicholzheim Priests

=== Archives ===
- http://www.landesarchiv-bw.de/sixcms/detail.php?template=hp_artikel&id=11174&sprache=en
- Archive sources: http://www.landesarchiv-bw.de/sixcms/media.php/25/transf_roeschner.pdf

=== Books ===
- Ältestes Dorf im unteren Taubertal by Dr. Paul Benz, 1984
- Fridolin Bischof tittle, "Reicholzheim- Blut und Boden" 1938
- Pfarrgemeinde St. Georg Reicholzheim Damals und Heute 2003

=== German websites ===
- http://www.reicholzheim.de/
- de:Reicholzheim
- http://www.s-line.de/homepages/horber-privat/reicho1.htm
- http://www.suehnekreuz.de/bw/reicholzheim.htm
- de:Wertheim (Main)
- de:Main-Tauber-Kreis

=== English websites ===
- Main-Tauber-Kreis
