= Dittwar =

- Stadtteil of Tauberbischofsheim
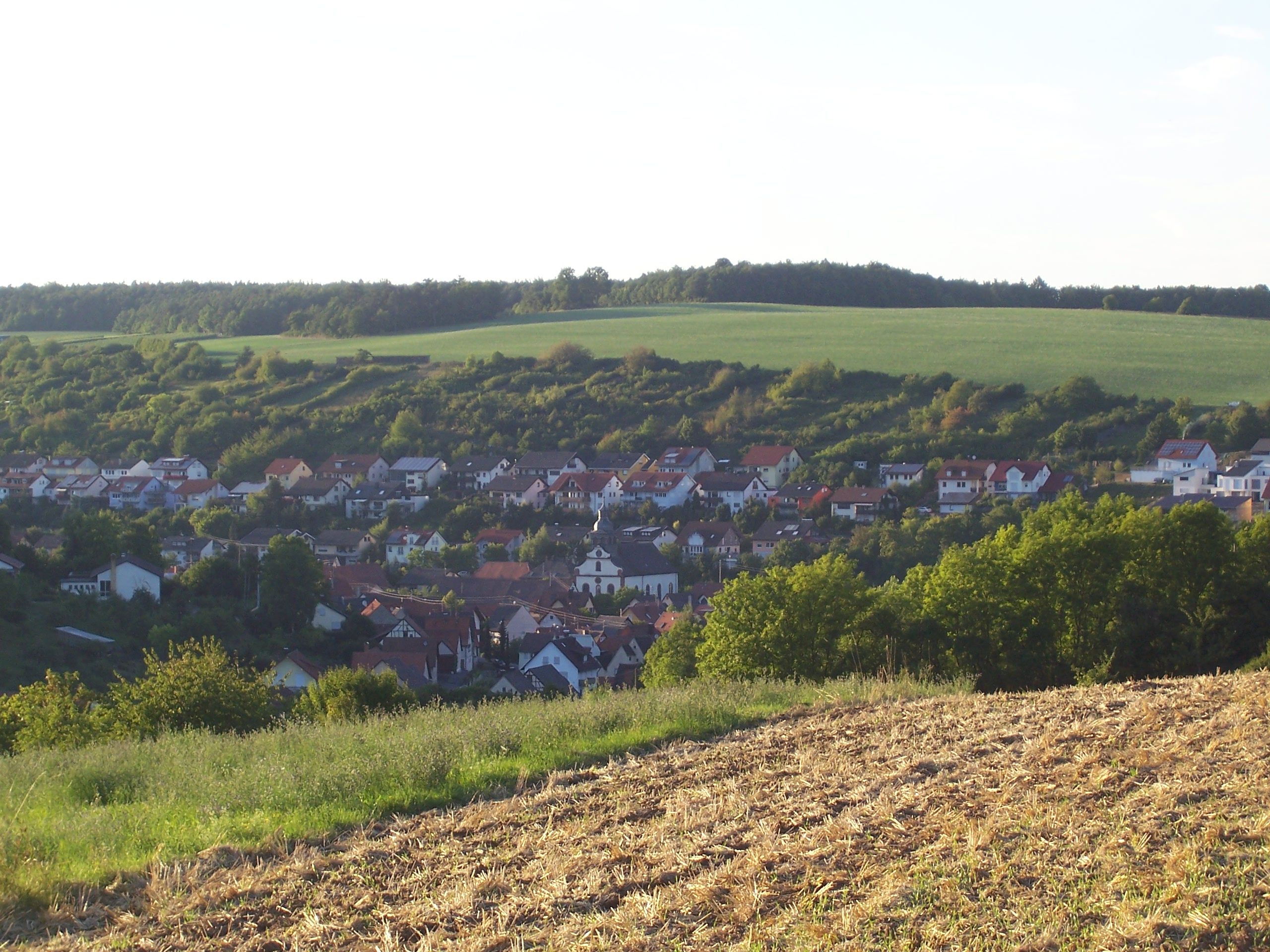

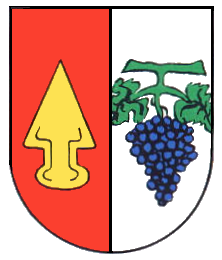
- Coat of arms
- Interactive map of Dittwar
- Location within Germany Location within Baden-Württemberg
- Coordinates: 49°35′20″N 9°38′10″E
- Country: Germany
- State: Baden-Württemberg
- District: Main-Tauber-Kreis
- Town: Tauberbischofsheim

Government
  - Mayor: Carsten Lotter (CDU)
- Elevation: 234 m (768 ft)
- Time zone: UTC+01:00 (CET)
  - Summer (DST): UTC+02:00 (CEST)
- Postal codes: 97941
- Dialling codes: 09341
- Vehicle registration: TBB
- Website: www.oelbachblaettle.de

Dittwar is a district of Tauberbischofsheim with 693 residents.

== Geography ==
=== Location ===
Dittwar is located south-west of Tauberbischofsheim in the Tauberfranken region of Franconia.

=== District ===
Dittwar is one of seven districts of Tauberbischofsheim. The other districts are the town of Tauberbischofsheim, as well as Dienstadt, Distelhausen, Dittigheim, Hochhausen and Impfingen. Dittwar was incorporated to Tauberbischofsheim during the local government reform in Baden-Württemberg on January 1, 1975.

== History ==
=== History of the village ===
Dittwar was first mentioned in 1100 as Ditebure (dit (mhd) = people / common / usually; bure (mhd) = farmer / neighbour). The name evolved to Dydebuor in 1343, Dytbuer in 1368, Dietbur in 1371, Dytewure in 1383, Dietwar in 1407, and finally Dittwar in 1615. The first mention Dittwar is related to the donation of the Castrum Dietebure by Count Henricus de Luden to the Prince-Bishop of Würzburg.

=== Coat of arms ===
The coat of arms of Dittwar show a bunch of grapes and a plough iron, both derived from the old seal of the village. The oldest known seal of the village dates from 1768 and shows a crowned wheel, flanked by the grapes and plough. The wheel is the symbol of the State of Mainz, to which the village belonged from medieval times until 1803. In the 19th century the village used a seal with a shield showing only the wheel. As the wheel is very common, it was decided to use the typical village symbols of the 18th century seal in the new arms.

== Culture ==
=== Church and chapel ===
The baroque church of St. Lawrence dating back to 1753. Pilgrimages to the "Kreuzhölzle" have taken place since 1660. Inside the church, the chapel at "Kreuzhölzle" and in the village baroque portals and ornate shrines can be found.

Views of the baroque church of St. Lawrence and the chapel at Kreuzhölzle in Dittwar

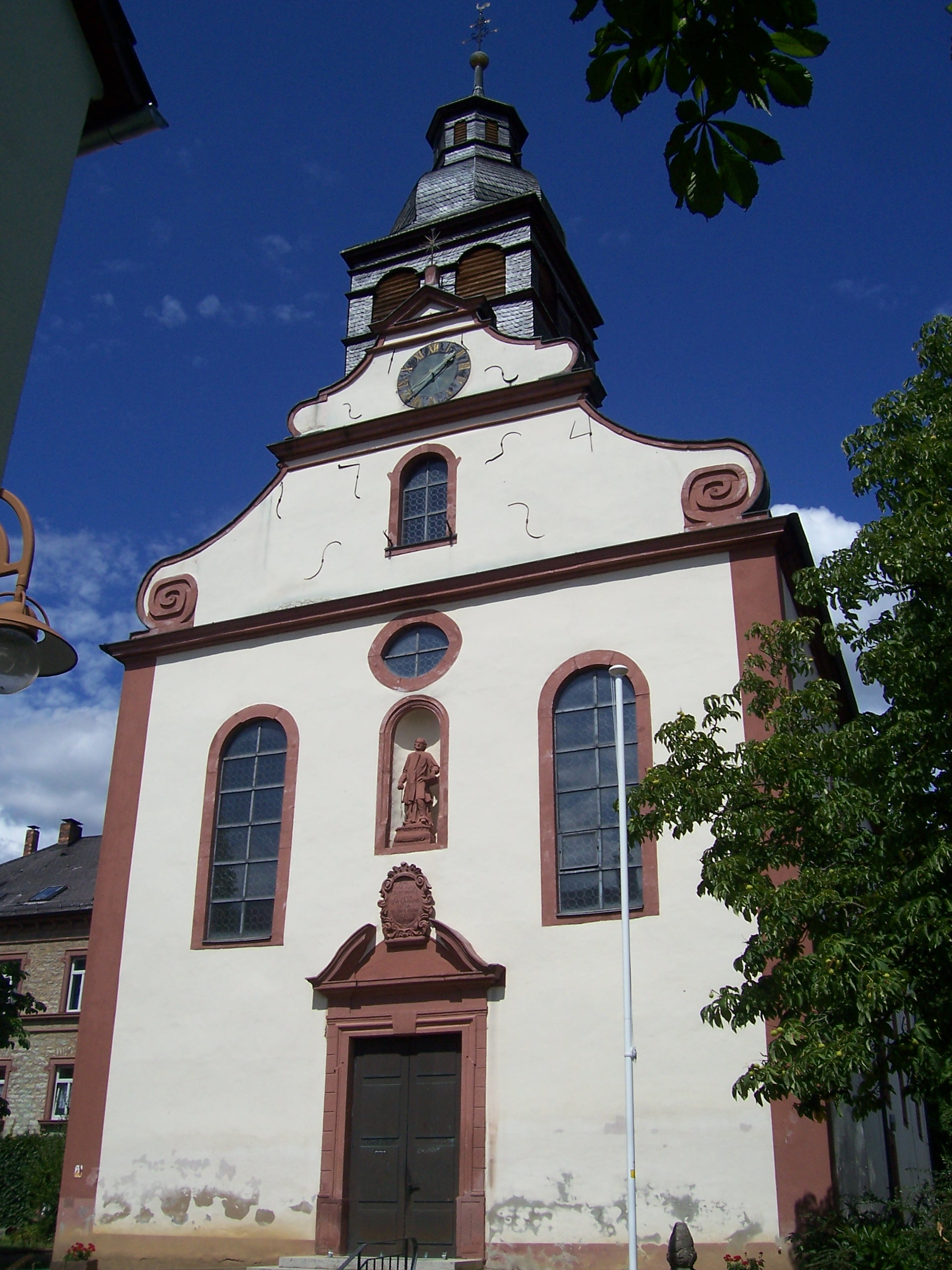
St. Lawrence in Dittwar

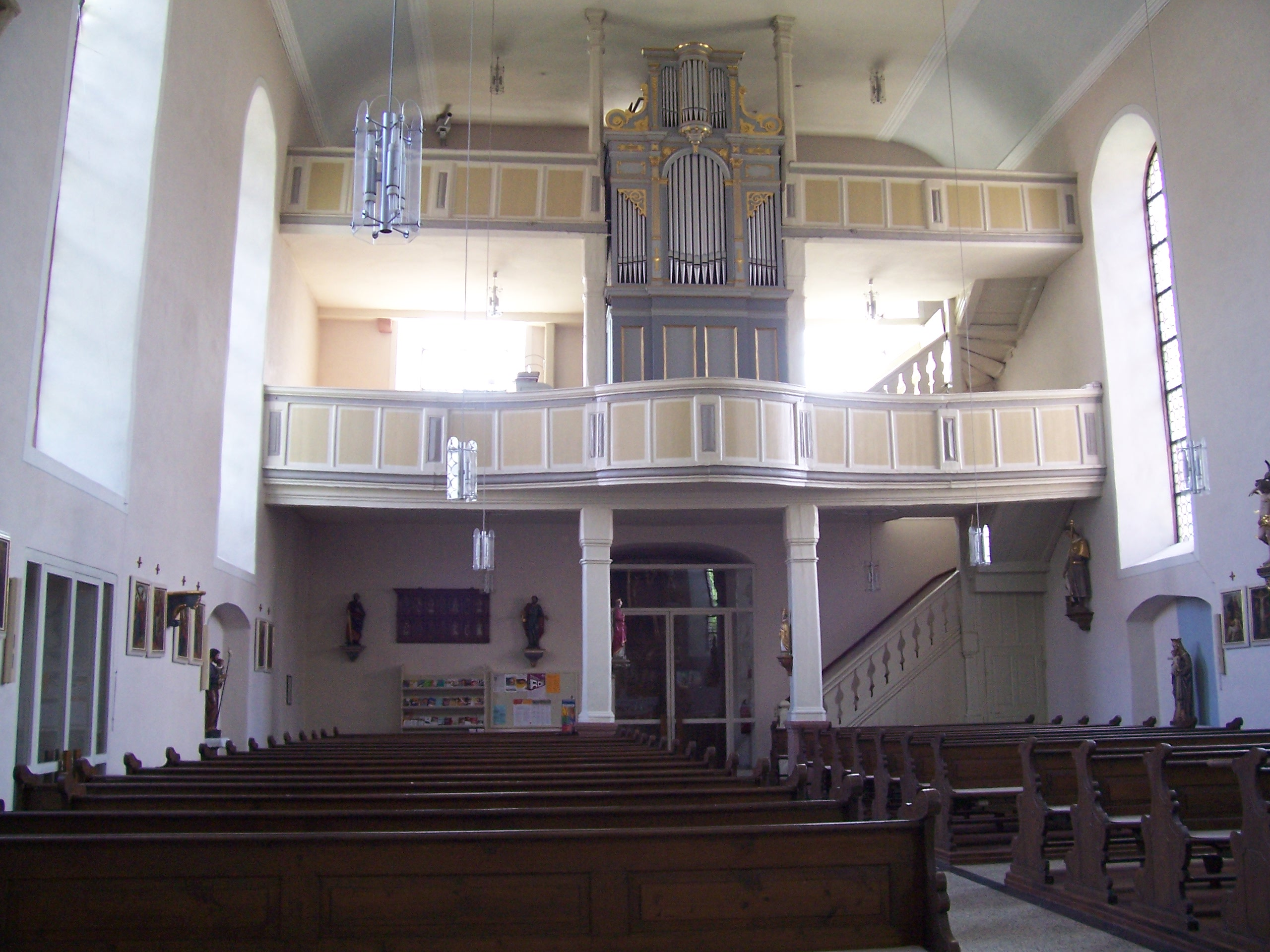
The gallery of St. Lawrence
with an organ of Wilhelm Schwarz & Sohn

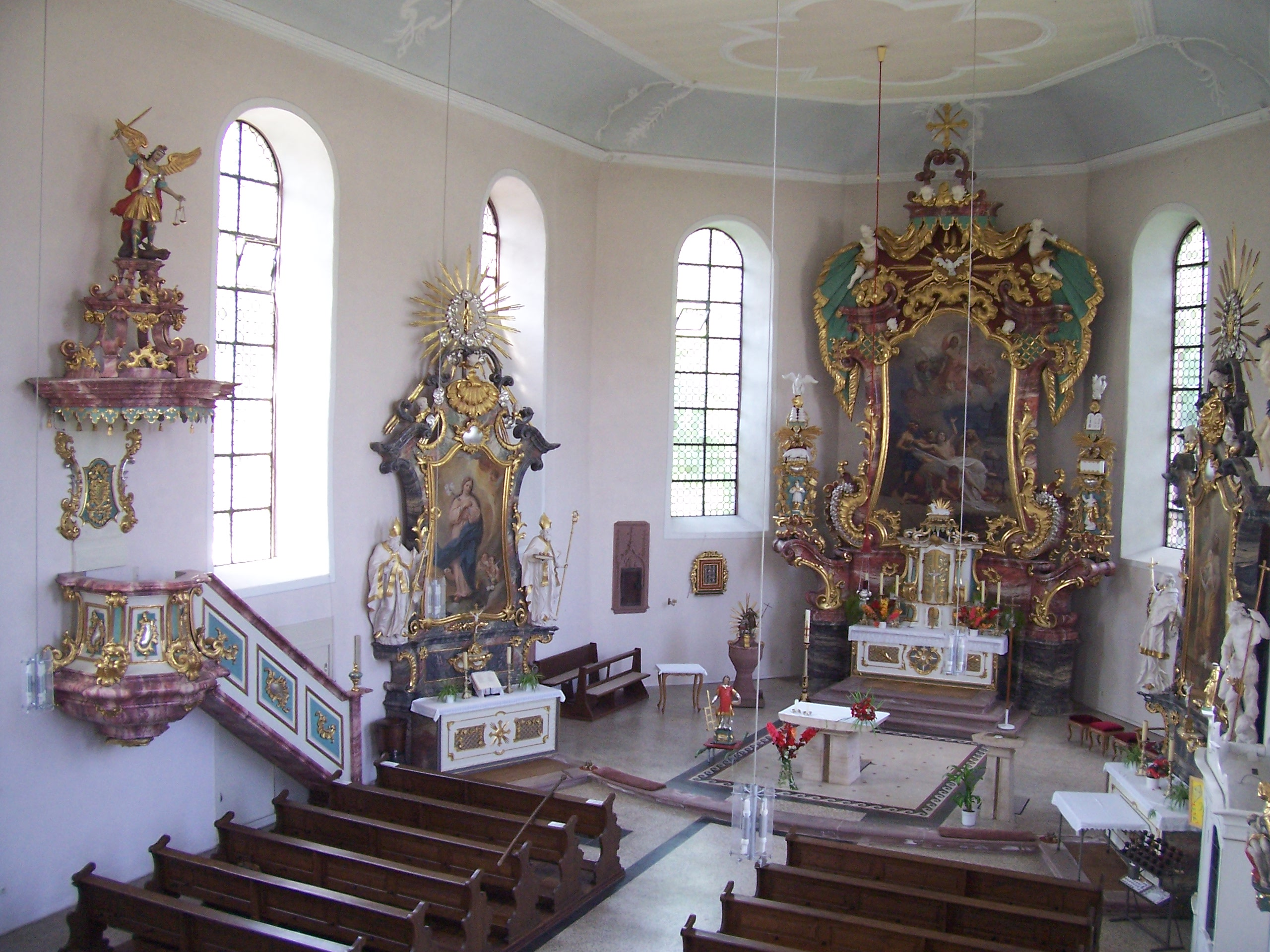
The interior of the church
with baroque portals and ornate shrines

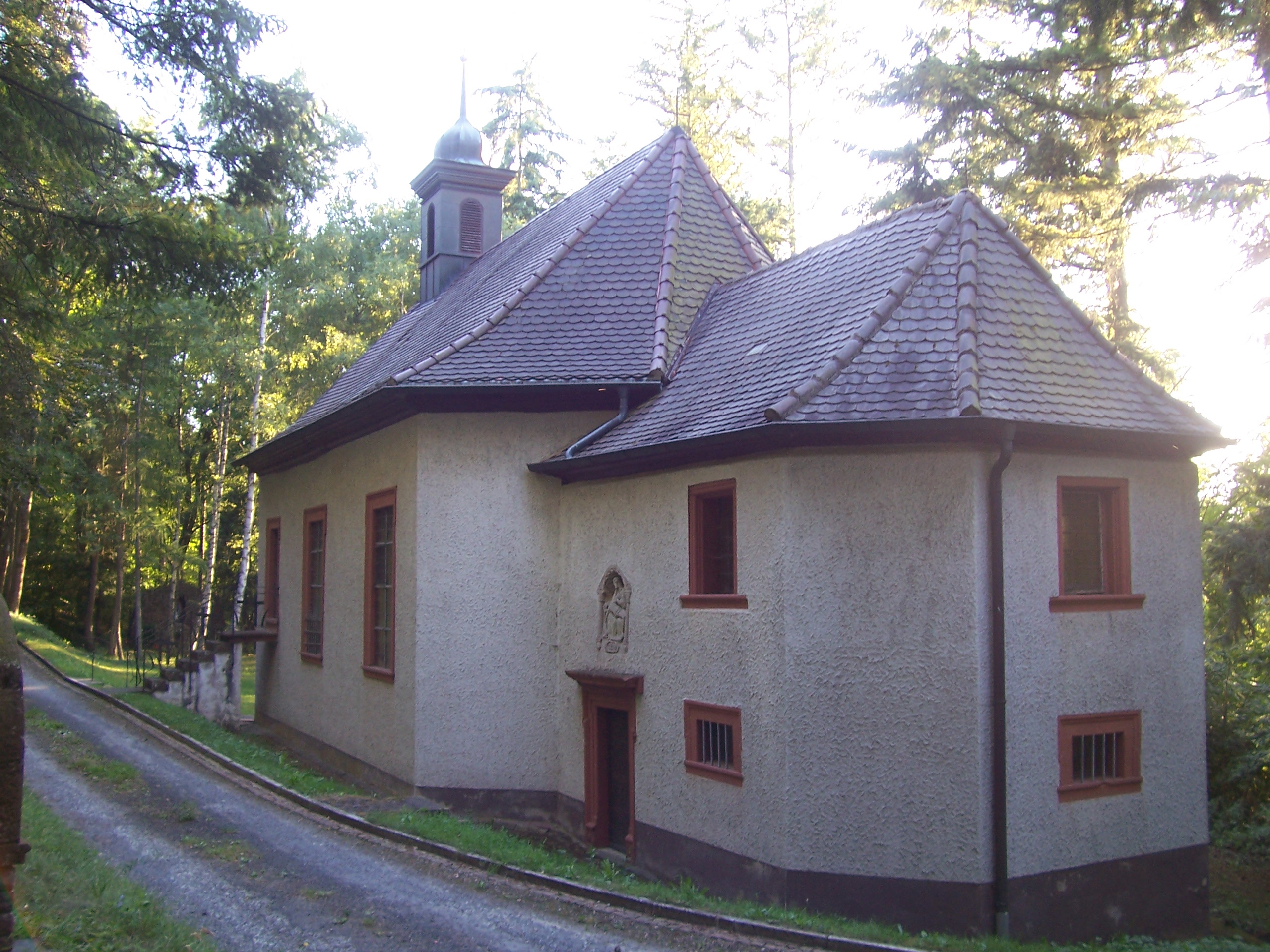
The chapel at "Kreuzhölzle", inaugurated in 1683

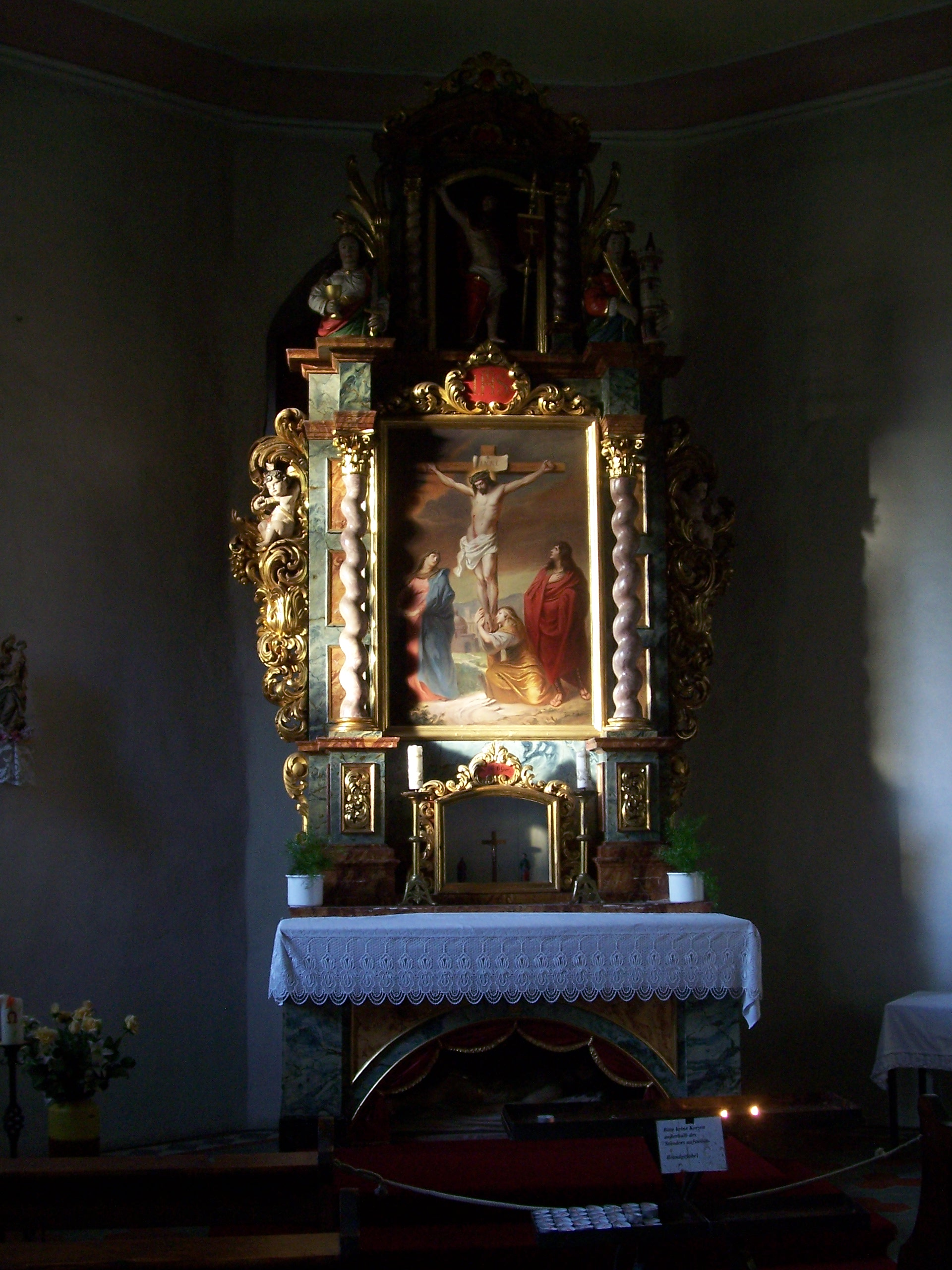
The altar of the chapel, with duplicates of 1669 found wooden figures (Mary and John) in the middle

=== Museum ===
In Dittwar there is a village-museum. It is a former farmhouse. In this farmhouse are housed flat, barn, cellar and stable in one building. In addition to exhibits from the period after 1900, a historic shoemaker's workshop is exhibited in a room.

=== Wayside shrines and crosses ===
There are more than 30 wayside shrines and crosses in the area of Dittwar.

Wayside shrines and crosses in Dittwar

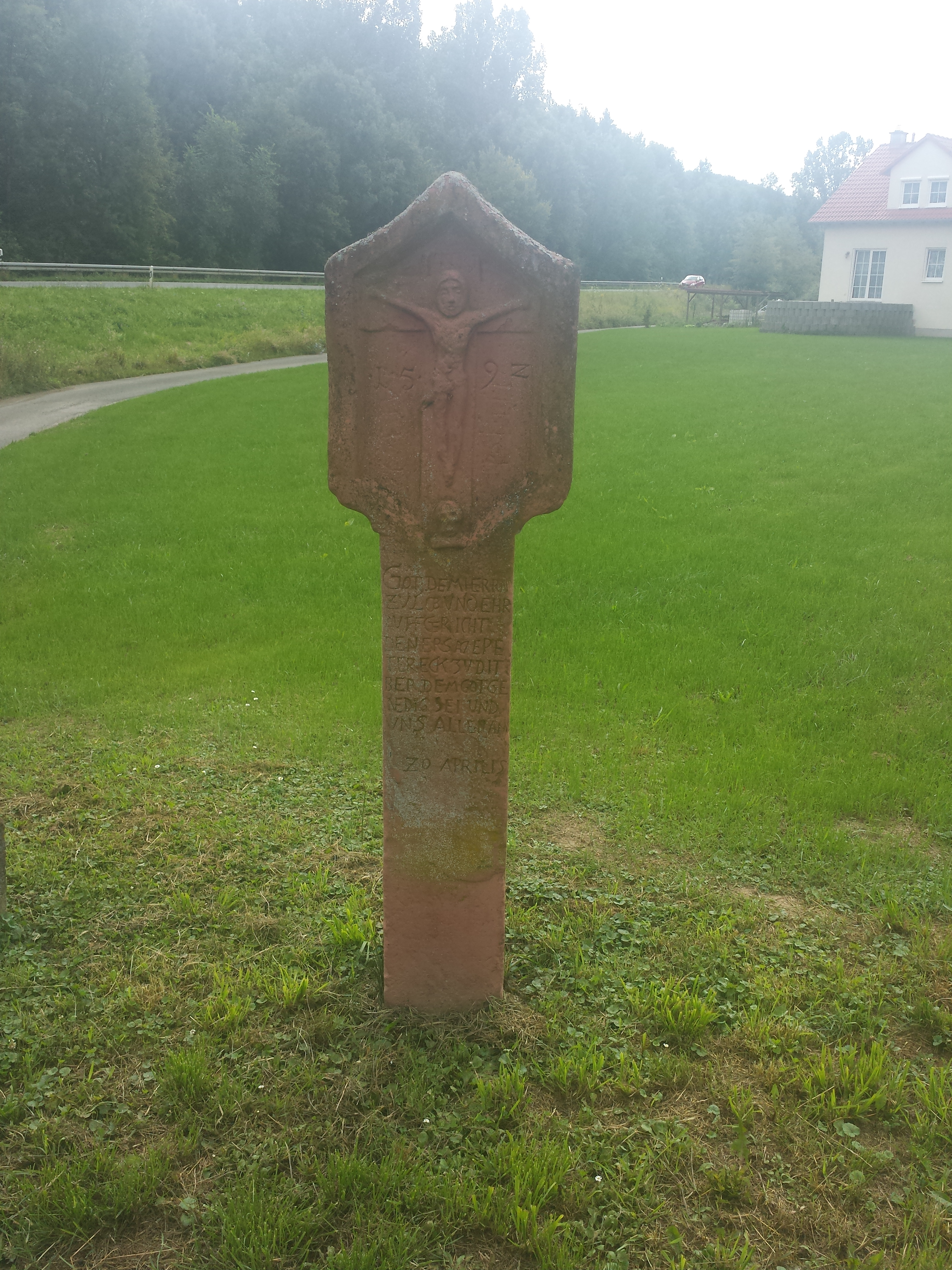
Wayside shrine at the entrance of the village from 1592

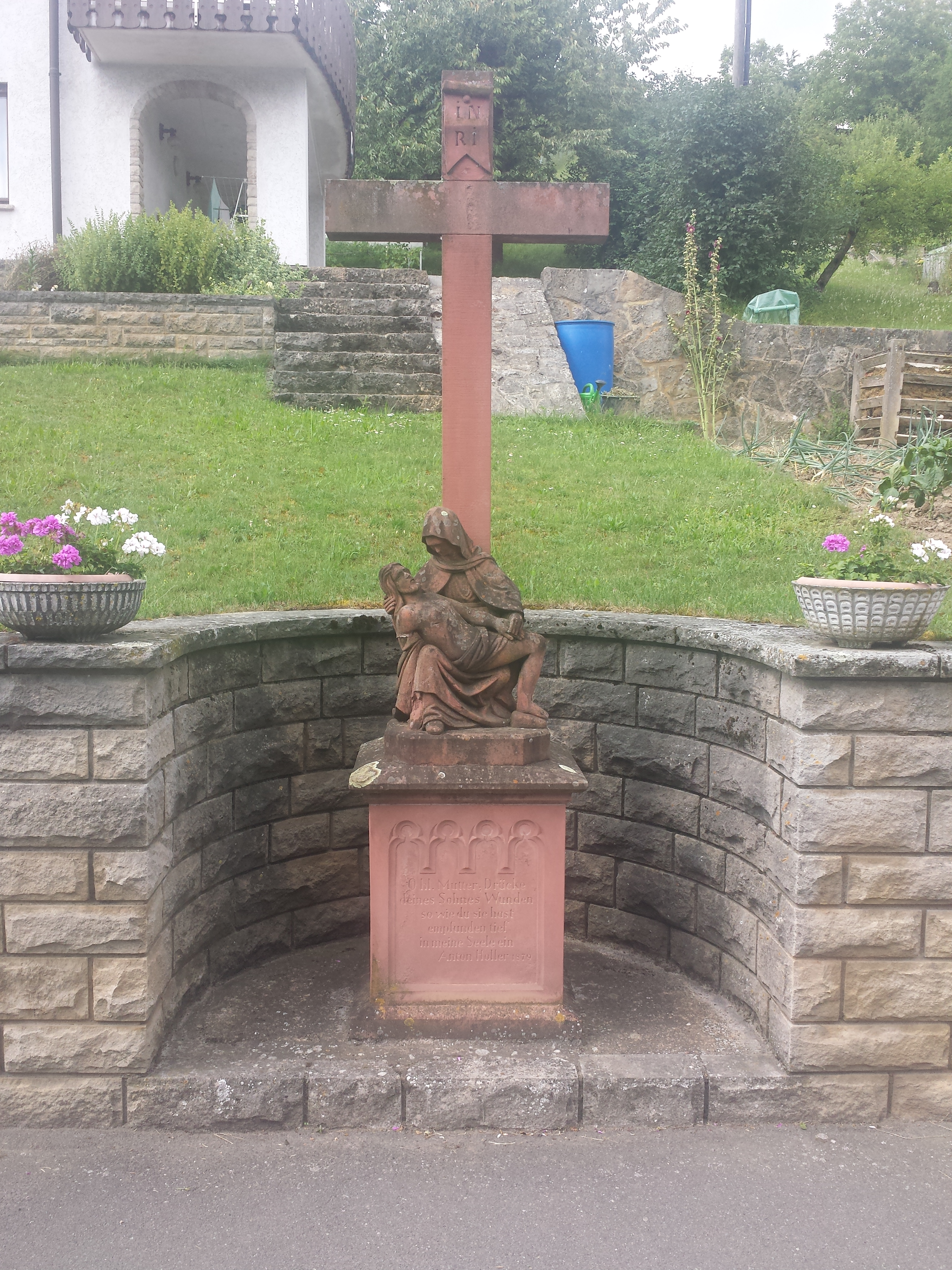
Pietà

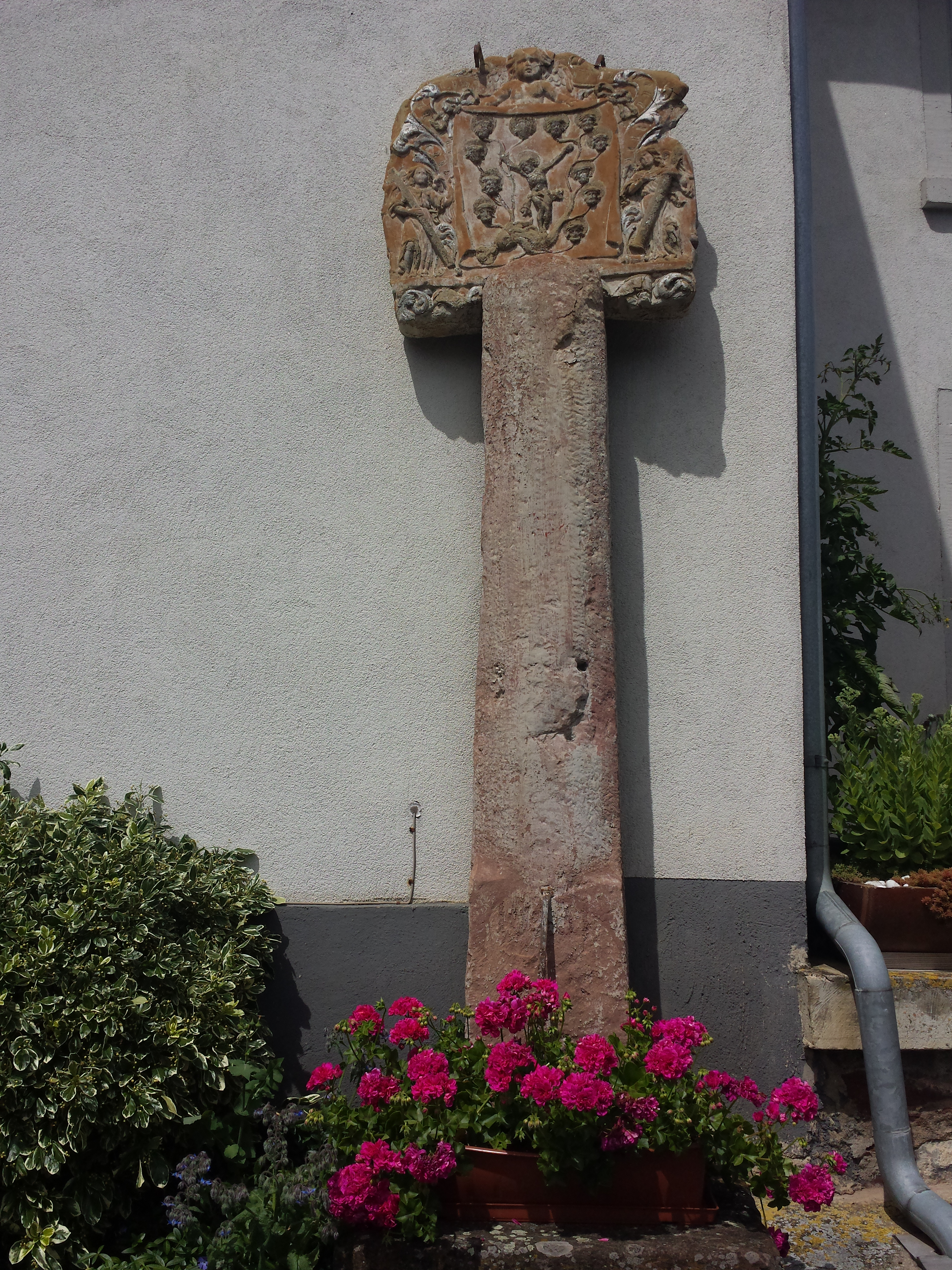
Wayside shrine about the blood miracle of Walldürn

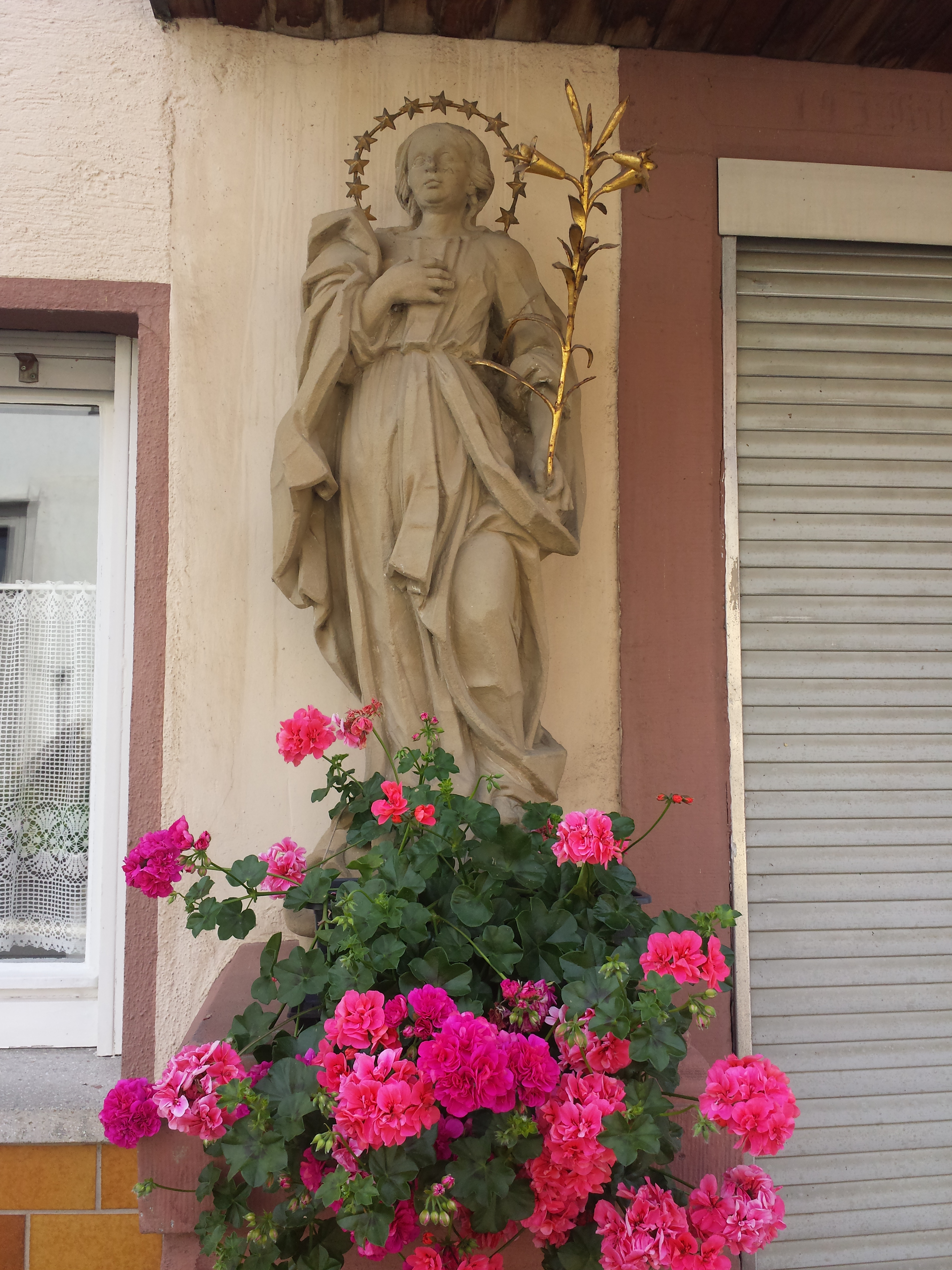
Wayside shrine at the valley road

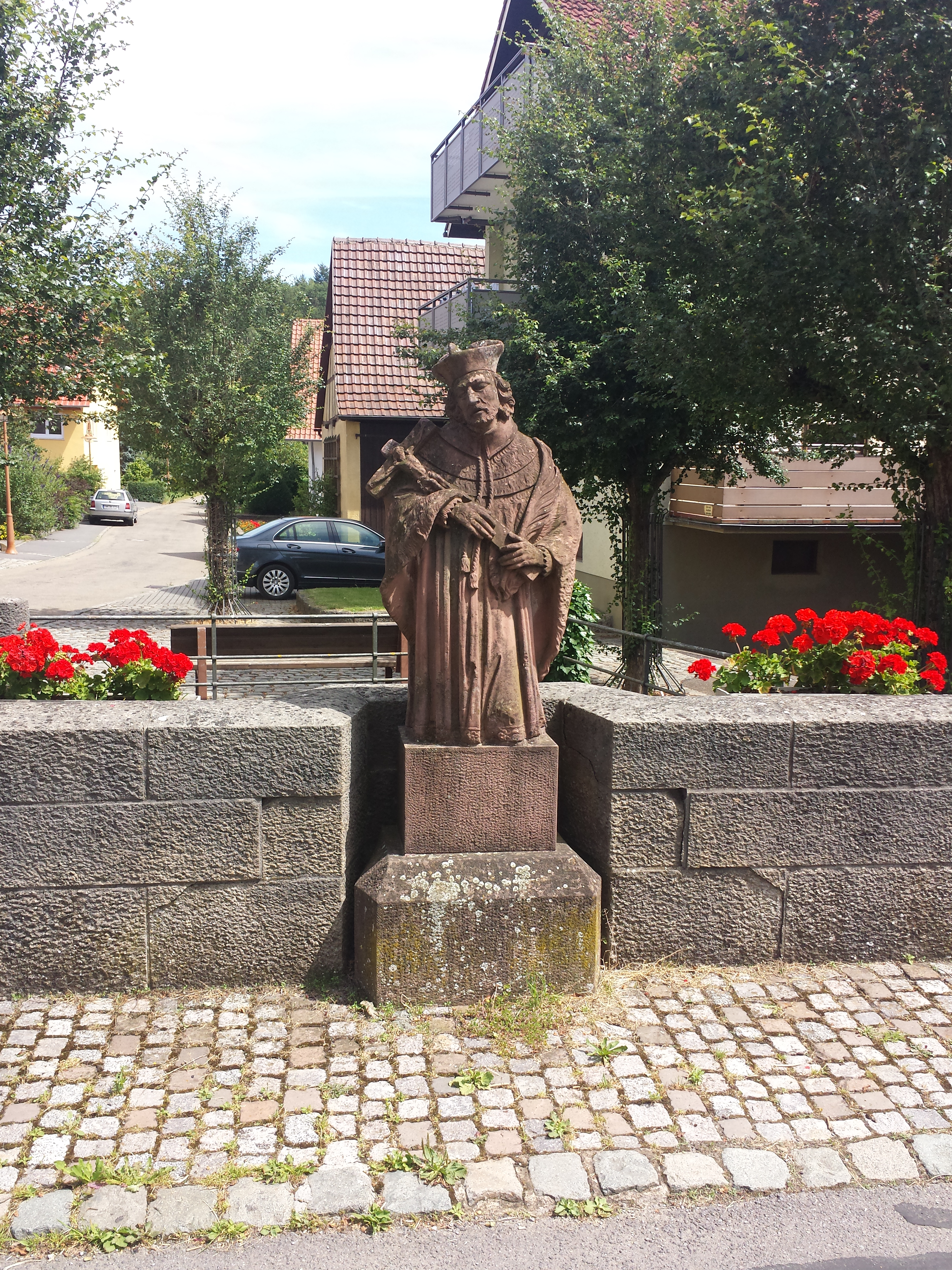
John of Nepomuk at a bridge

== People from Dittwar ==
- Franz Heffner (born 17th century–c. 1700), Premonstratensian in the monastery Oberzell, theologian and preacher
- Gottfried Hammerich (c. 1630–1710), Abbot of the monastery Obernzell
- Franz Callenbach (1663–1743), satirical writer and Jesuit
- Günter Clauser (4 January 1923 – 12 July 1982), doctor, psychoanalyst and nonfiction author.
