= Dienstadt =

- Stadtteil of Tauberbischofsheim
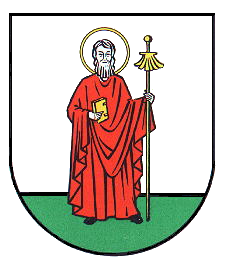
- Coat of arms
- Interactive map of Dienstadt
- Location within Germany Location within Baden-Württemberg
- Coordinates: 49°38′8″N 09°36′39″E
- Country: Germany
- State: Baden-Württemberg
- District: Main-Tauber-Kreis
- Town: Tauberbischofsheim

Population
  - Total: 315
- Time zone: UTC+01:00 (CET)
  - Summer (DST): UTC+02:00 (CEST)
- Postal codes: 97941
- Dialling codes: 09341
- Vehicle registration: TBB

Dienstadt is a district of Tauberbischofsheim with 315 residents.

== Geography ==
Dienstadt is located west of Tauberbischofsheim in the Tauberfranken region of Franconia.

== History ==
Dienstadt was first mentioned in 1314 as Diestadt, in 1341 it was renamed Dienstadt.

Dienstadt is one of seven districts of Tauberbischofsheim. The other districts are the town of Tauberbischofsheim, as well as Distelhausen, Dittigheim, Dittwar, Hochhausen and Impfingen.

Dienstadt was incorporated to Tauberbischofsheim during the local government reform in Baden-Württemberg on January 1, 1972.
