= Impfingen =

- Stadtteil of Tauberbischofsheim
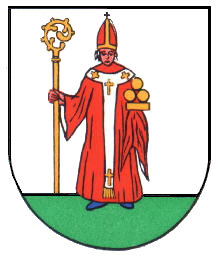
- Coat of arms
- Interactive map of Impfingen
- Location within Germany Location within Baden-Württemberg
- Coordinates: 49°38′51″N 09°39′35″E
- Country: Germany
- State: Baden-Württemberg
- District: Main-Tauber-Kreis
- Town: Tauberbischofsheim
- Time zone: UTC+01:00 (CET)
  - Summer (DST): UTC+02:00 (CEST)
- Postal codes: 97941
- Dialling codes: 09341
- Vehicle registration: TBB

Impfingen is a district of Tauberbischofsheim with 1023 residents.

== Geography ==
Impfingen is located north of Tauberbischofsheim in the Tauberfranken region of Franconia.

== History ==
Impfingen is one of seven districts of Tauberbischofsheim. The other districts are the town of Tauberbischofsheim, as well as Dienstadt, Distelhausen, Dittigheim, Dittwar and Hochhausen.

Impfingen was incorporated to Tauberbischofsheim during the local government reform in Baden-Württemberg on January 1, 1971.
