= Distelhausen =

- Stadtteil of Tauberbischofsheim
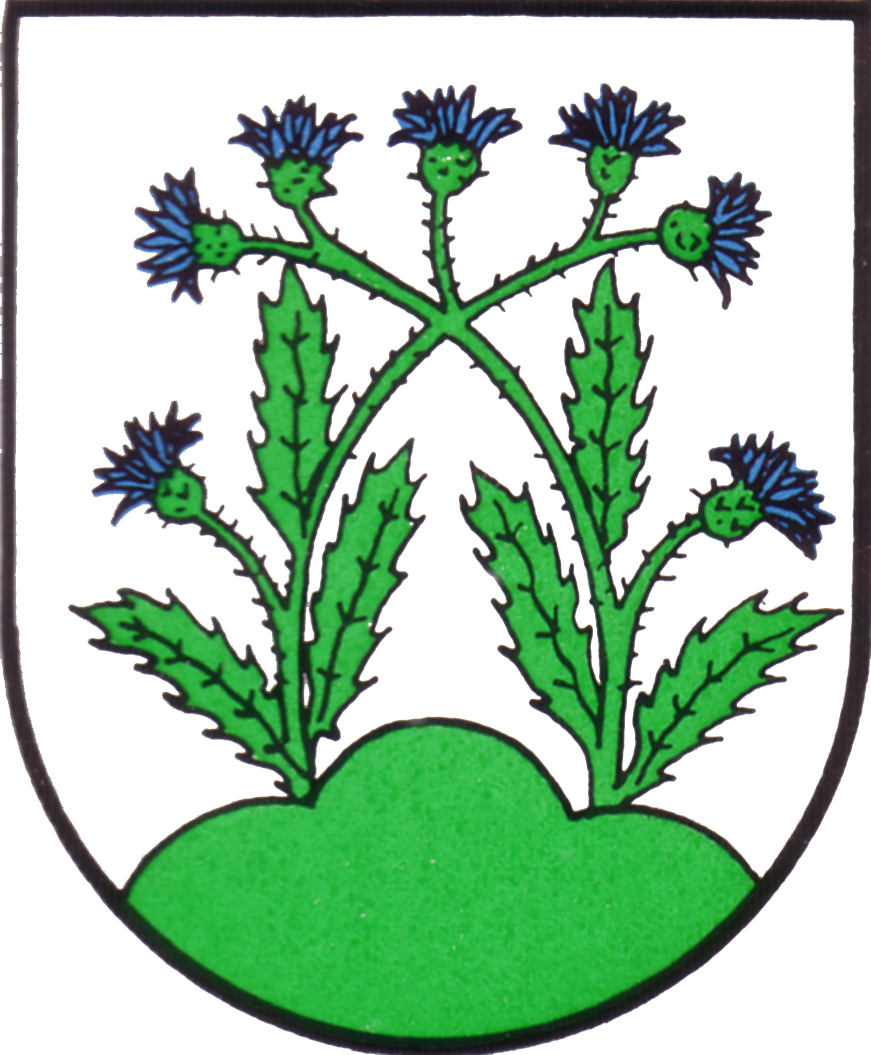
- Coat of arms
- Interactive map of Distelhausen
- Location within Germany Location within Baden-Württemberg
- Coordinates: 49°35′55″N 09°41′40″E
- Country: Germany
- State: Baden-Württemberg
- District: Main-Tauber-Kreis
- Town: Tauberbischofsheim
- Time zone: UTC+01:00 (CET)
  - Summer (DST): UTC+02:00 (CEST)
- Postal codes: 97941
- Dialling codes: 09341
- Vehicle registration: TBB

Distelhausen is a district of Tauberbischofsheim with 882 residents.

== Geography ==
Distelhausenis located south-east of Tauberbischofsheim in the Tauberfranken region of Franconia.

== History ==
Distelhausen is one of seven districts of Tauberbischofsheim. The other districts are the town of Tauberbischofsheim, as well as Dienstadt, Dittigheim, Dittwar, Hochhausen and Impfingen.

Distelhausen was incorporated to Tauberbischofsheim during the local government reform in Baden-Württemberg on January 1, 1975.
