= Großrinderfeld =

- Municipality
- Coat of arms

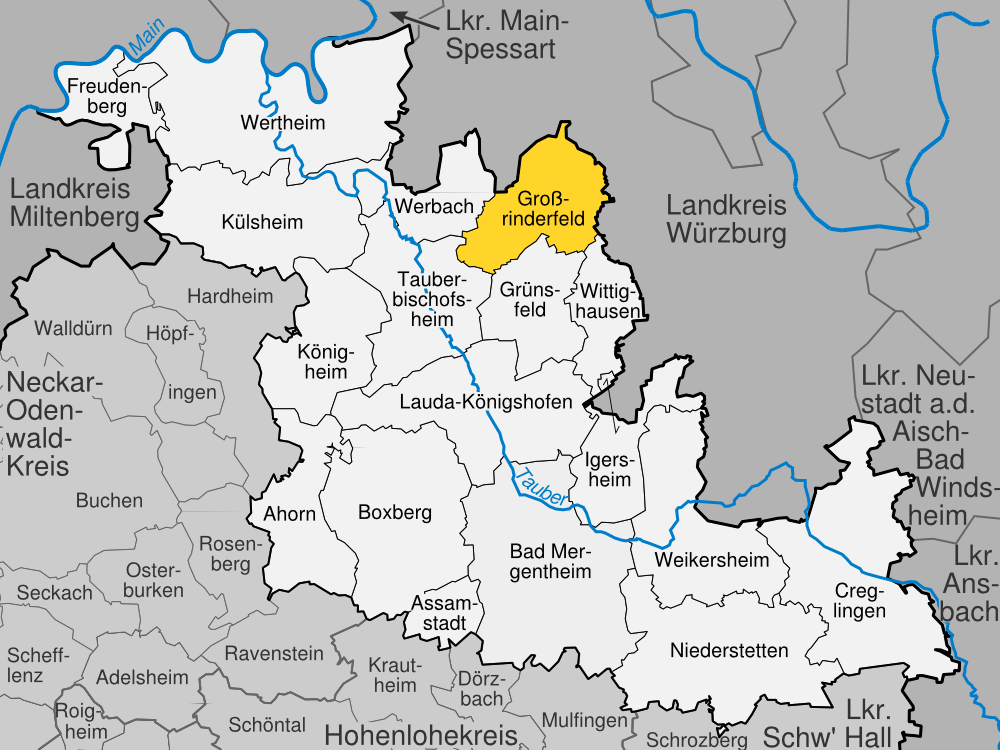
- Location of Großrinderfeld within Main-Tauber-Kreis district
- Interactive map of Großrinderfeld
- Location within Germany Location within Baden-Württemberg
- Coordinates: 49°39′53″N 09°44′05″E
- Country: Germany
- State: Baden-Württemberg
- Admin. region: Stuttgart
- District: Main-Tauber-Kreis

Government
  - Mayor (2019–27): Johannes Leibold

Area
  - Total: 56.28 km^{2} (21.73 sq mi)
- Elevation: 311 m (1,020 ft)

Population (2025-12-31)
  - Total: 4,101
  - Density: 72.87/km^{2} (188.7/sq mi)
- Time zone: UTC+01:00 (CET)
  - Summer (DST): UTC+02:00 (CEST)
- Postal codes: 97950
- Dialling codes: 09349 / 09344
- Vehicle registration: TBB, MGH
- Website: www.grossrinderfeld.de

Großrinderfeld is a municipality in southwestern Germany, in the state of Baden-Württemberg. It is located between Tauberbischofsheim and Würzburg.

Großrinderfeld consists of the four villages of Großrinderfeld, Gerchsheim, Schönfeld and Ilmspan.

== History ==
- Until 1803, Großrinderfeld belonged to the "Kurfürstentum Mainz", then it became part of the Grand Duchy of Baden
- On 25 July 1866 the area of Großrinderfeld and the village Gerchsheim were the place of one of the last combats of the Austro-Prussian War. The Prussians there defeated troops of the South-German allies of Austria during the Campaign of the Main.
- In 1975 the three villages of Gerchsheim, Schönfeld und Ilmspan have been merged with Großrinderfeld to form greater Großrinderfeld
