= Badischer Hof (Tauberbischofsheim) =

Coordinates: 49°37′34.8″N 9°39′21.5″E

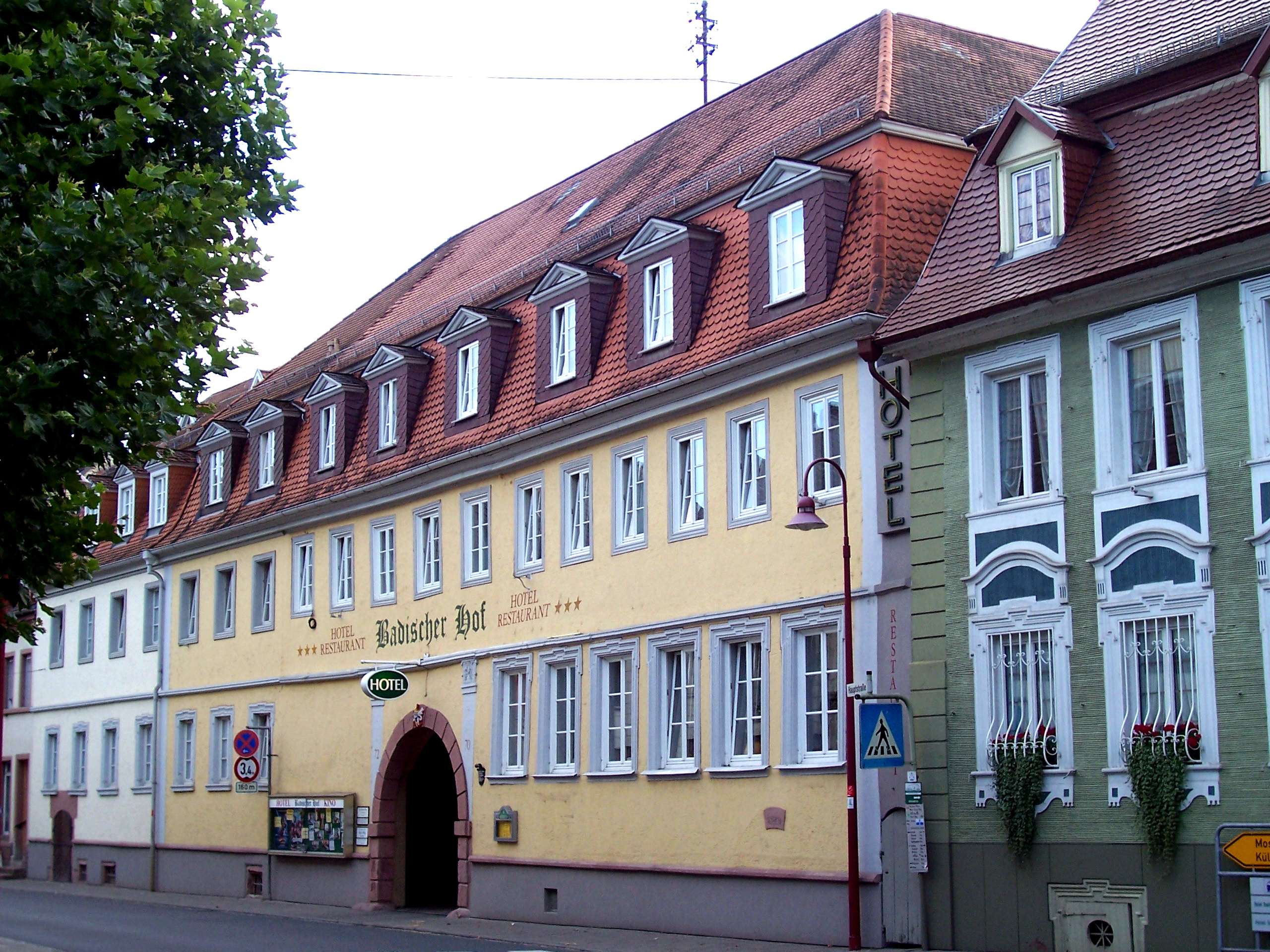
Badischer Hof (2013)

The Badischer Hof (in English Court of Baden) is the oldest hotel in Tauberbischofsheim. In 1733 it was built as the former Adelshof by the knight Anton Phillip von Fleischmann. Later, it was as a post office. In 1811 it received its present name: Badischer Hof. In 1894 a hall with large arched windows was added. In the hotel there is also a nostalgic movie theater. The house was obtained externally faithfully and since eight generations it belongs to the family Derr. It is a listed building.
