= Tauberbischofsheim Altarpiece =

Altarpiece paintings by Matthias Grünewald

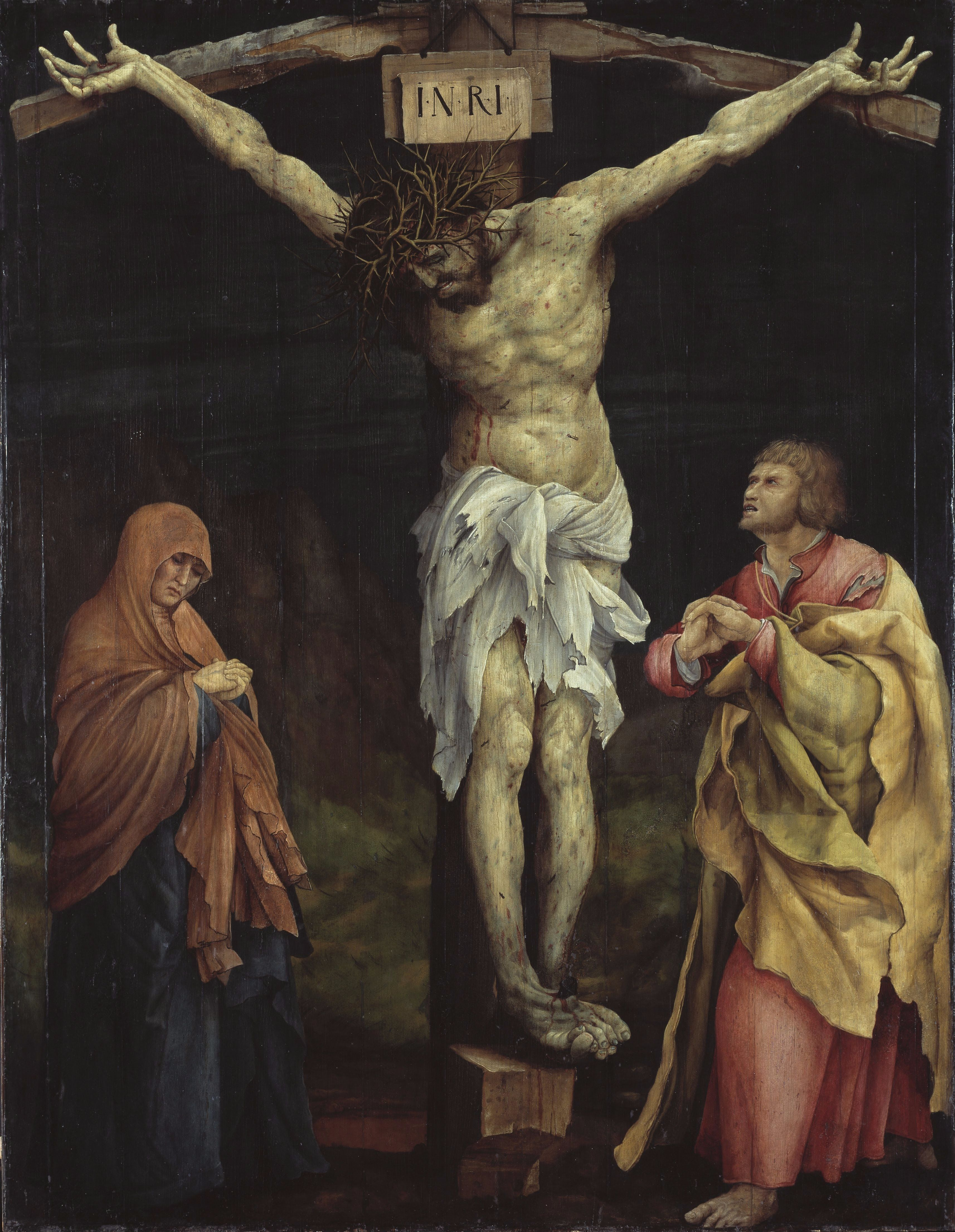
Panel of the Tauberbischofsheim Altar: Crucifixion

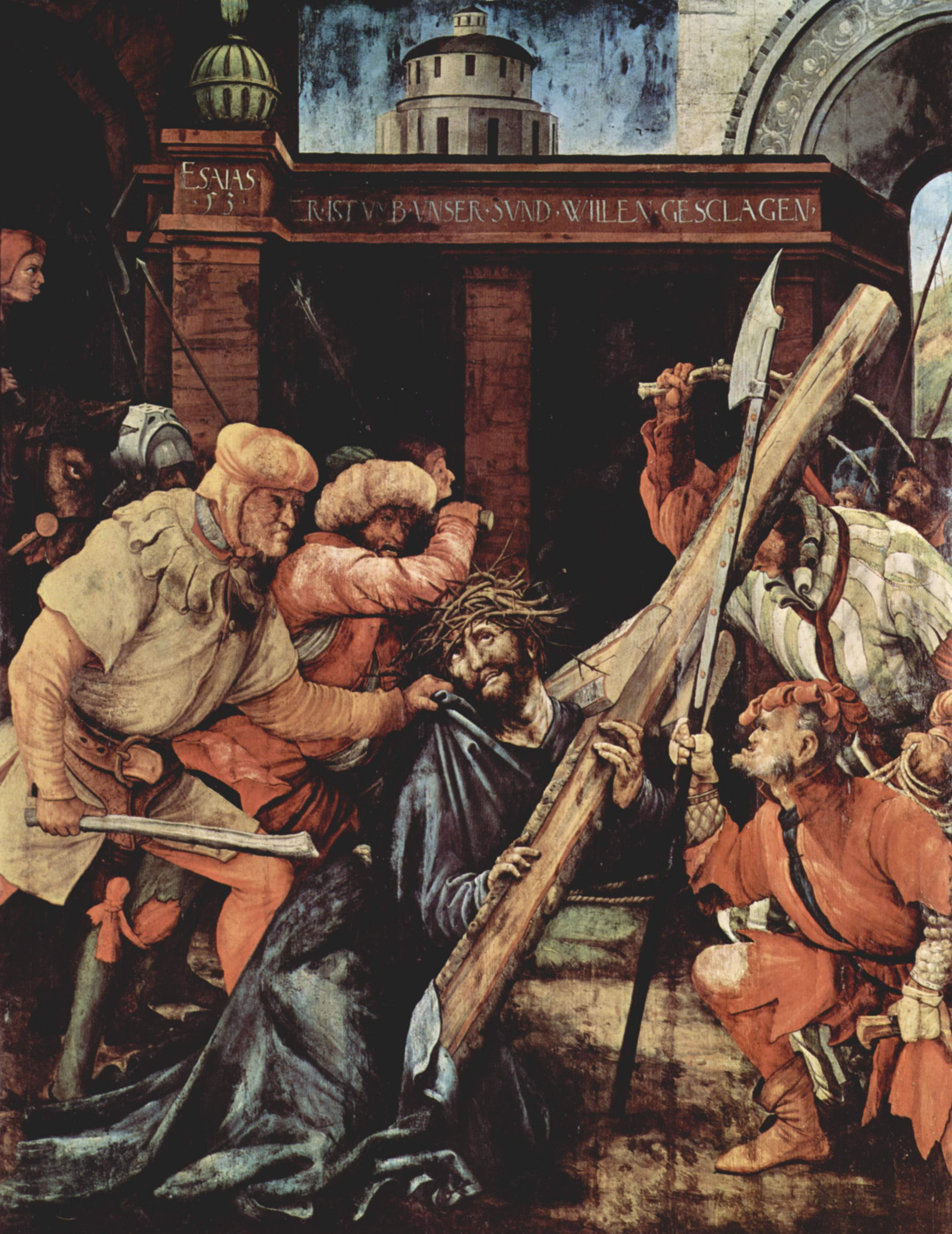
Panel of the Tauberbischofsheim Altar: Christ Bearing the Cross

The Tauberischofsheim Altarpiece (earlier known as the Karlsruhe altarpiece or Karlsruhe panels; German: Tauberbischofsheimer Altar, Karlsruher Altar, and Karlsruher Tafeln, respectively) is a late work by the German Renaissance painter Matthias Grünewald, probably completed between 1523 and 1525. The earliest written references to the work come from the 18th century when the altarpiece was still in the Church of St. Martin in Tauberbischofsheim. Its original location and the identity of the patron who commissioned it are not known, but it is assumed that they both were in Tauberbischofsheim.

The panels, which today are displayed separately, were originally painted on either side of a 196 cm by 152 cm wooden panel. Whether the pieces were the central part of a polyptych is uncertain, however. In order to display the work in an art museum, the panel was split in half during its first restoration in 1883. The paintings have been in the collection of the Staatliche Kunsthalle Karlsruhe since 1900.

Joris-Karl Huysmans' novel Là-bas (1891) describes the crucifixion in its first chapter. Huysmans wrote:

How far removed one is when confronted by this bloody and tear-stained Calvary from those debonair Golgothas adopted by the Church ever since the Renaissance! This lockjawed Christ is no Christ of the rich, no Galilean Adonis, no dandified picture of health, no handsome youth with curly brown tresses.... This is the Christ of the poor, the Christ who is one and the same with the most wretched of those He has come to save, the beggars and outcasts....

== Sources ==
- Heinrich Feurstein: Matthias Grünewald. Bonn 1930
- Walther Karl Zülch: Der historische Grünewald. Bruckmann, Munich 1938
- Kurt Martin: Grünewalds Kreuzigung der Karlsruher Galerie in der Beschreibung von Joris-Karl Huysmans. Verlag Florian Kupferberg, Mainz 1947
- Jan Lauts (Ed.): Staatliche Kunsthalle Karlsruhe – Katalog Alter Meister bis 1800. Karlsruhe 1966
- Staatliche Kunsthalle Karlsruhe (Ed.), Christian Müller: Grünewalds Werke in Karlsruhe. Karlsruhe 1984
- Howard C. Collinson: Three Paintings by Mathis Gothart-Neithart called „Grünewald“. The Transcendent Narrative as Devotional Image. (Dissertation Yale University 1986)
- Karen van den Berg: Die Passion zu malen. Zur Bildauffassung bei Matthias Grünewald. (Dissertation Basel 1995), Duisburg Berlin 1997, ISBN 3-932256-00-X
- Karl Arndt and Bernd Moeller: Die Bücher und letzten Bilder Mathis Gotharts des sogenannten Grünewald. Nachrichten der Akademie der Wissenschaften zu Göttingen, I. Philologisch-Historische Klasse, Nr. 5 (2002), ISSN 0065-5287
- Staatliche Kunsthalle Karlsruhe (Ed.), Jessica Mack-Andrick et al. (Ed.): Grünewald und seine Zeit. (anlässlich der Großen Landesausstellung Baden-Württemberg). Dt. Kunstverlag, München/Berlin 2007, ISBN 978-3-925212-71-0
  - Dietmar Lüdke: Die „Kreuzigung“ des Tauberbischofsheimer Altars im Kontext der Bildtradition. In: Grünewald und seine Zeit. 2007, S. 209–240
  - Jessica Mack-Andrick (I): Die „Kreuztragung“ des Tauberbischofsheimer Altars als Beispiel andachtsfördernder Bildstrategien. In: Grünewald und seine Zeit, 2007, P. 241–272
  - Jessica Mack-Andrick (II): Von beiden Seiten betrachtet – Überlegungen zum Tauberbischofsheimer Altar. In: Grünewald und seine Zeit. 2007, P. 68–77
