= Bischofsheim =

Bischofsheim may refer to the following towns:

- Bischofsheim, Hesse, in Hesse, Germany
- Maintal-Bischofsheim, a district of the city of Maintal in Hesse, Germany
- Bischofsheim in der Rhön, in Bavaria, Germany
- Bischoffsheim, in Bas-Rhin, France

Bischofsheim as part of name

- Gau-Bischofsheim, Rheinland-Pfalz
- Neckarbischofsheim, Baden-Württemberg
- Rheinbischofsheim, Baden-Württemberg
- Tauberbischofsheim, Baden-Württemberg
