= Assamstadt =

- Municipality
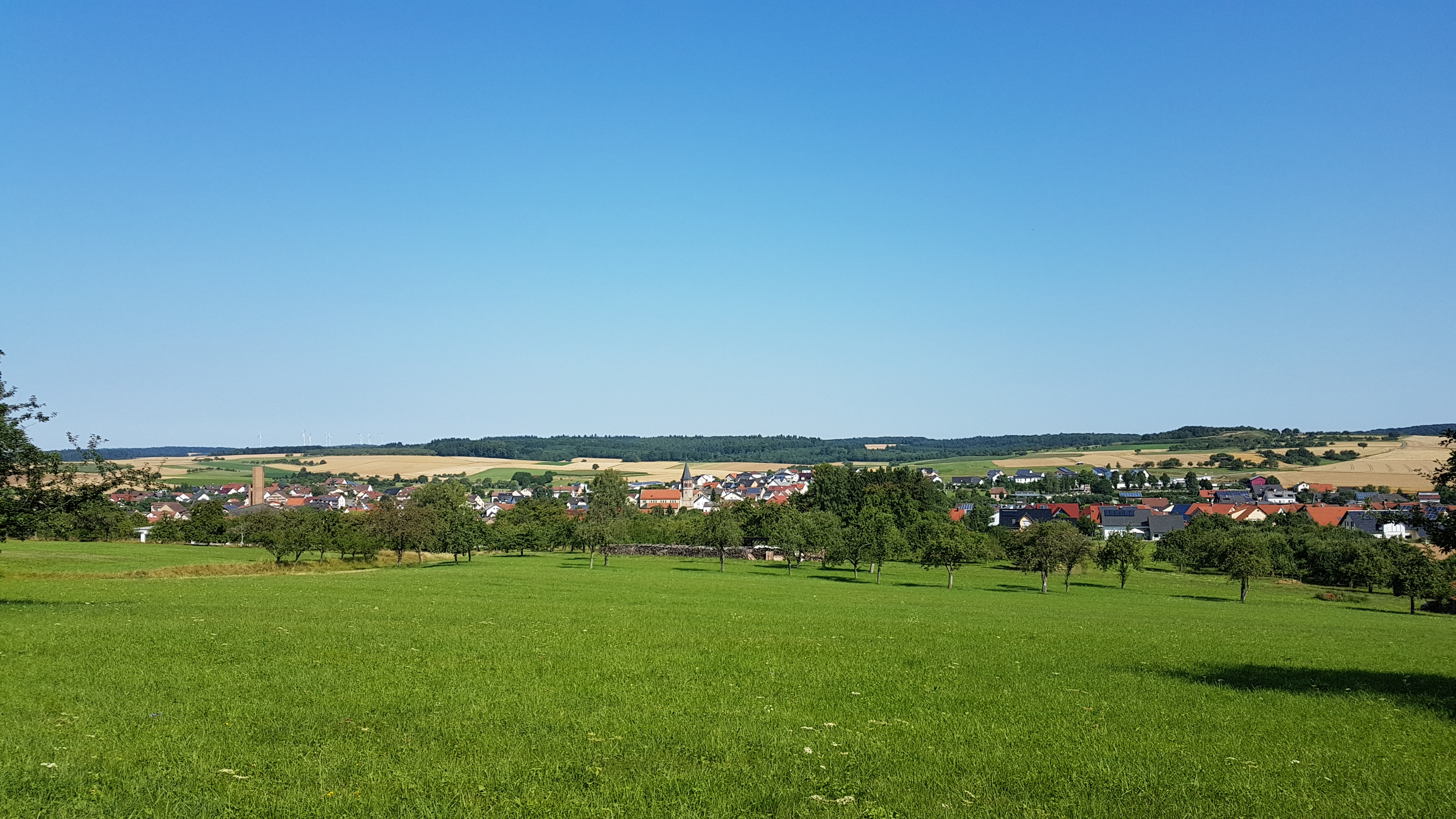
- General view of the town

- Coat of arms

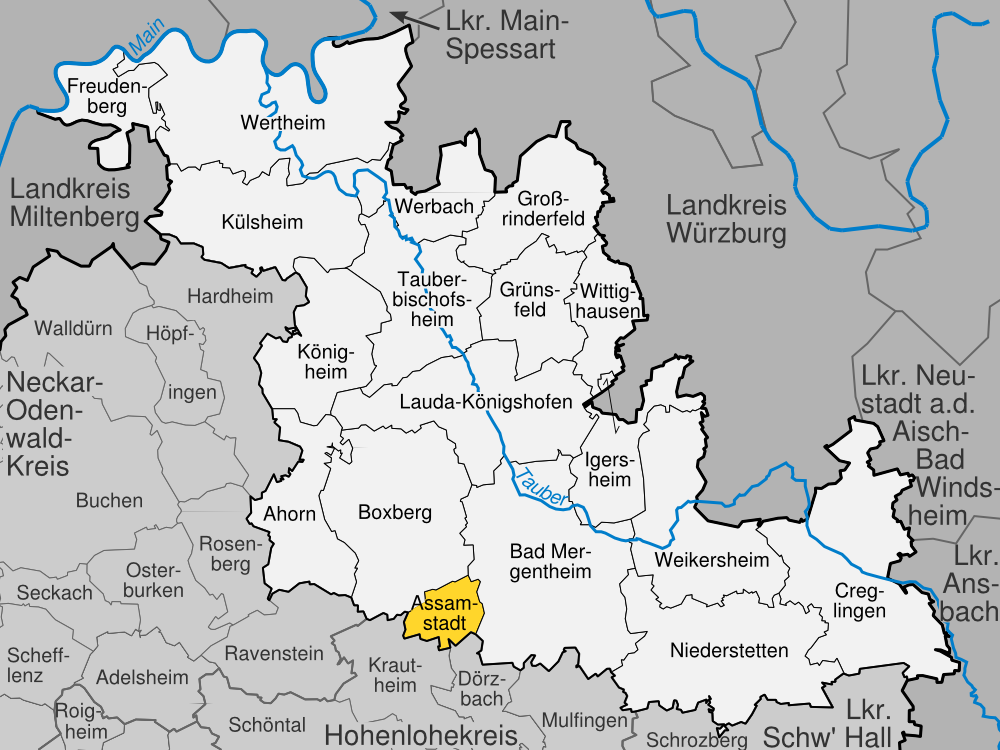
- Location of Assamstadt within Main-Tauber-Kreis district
- Interactive map of Assamstadt
- Location within Germany Location within Baden-Württemberg
- Coordinates: 49°25′37″N 09°41′13″E
- Country: Germany
- State: Baden-Württemberg
- Admin. region: Stuttgart
- District: Main-Tauber-Kreis

Government
  - Mayor (2018–26): Joachim Döffinger

Area
  - Total: 17.20 km^{2} (6.64 sq mi)
- Elevation: 340 m (1,120 ft)

Population (2025-12-31)
  - Total: 2,284
  - Density: 132.8/km^{2} (343.9/sq mi)
- Time zone: UTC+01:00 (CET)
  - Summer (DST): UTC+02:00 (CEST)
- Postal codes: 97959
- Dialling codes: 06294
- Vehicle registration: TBB, MGH
- Website: www.assamstadt.de

Assamstadt (German pronunciation: [ˈasamˌʃtat]) is a municipality in the district of Main-Tauber in Baden-Württemberg in Germany. Assamstadt is famous for its carnival.
