= Tauberbischofsheim =

- Town
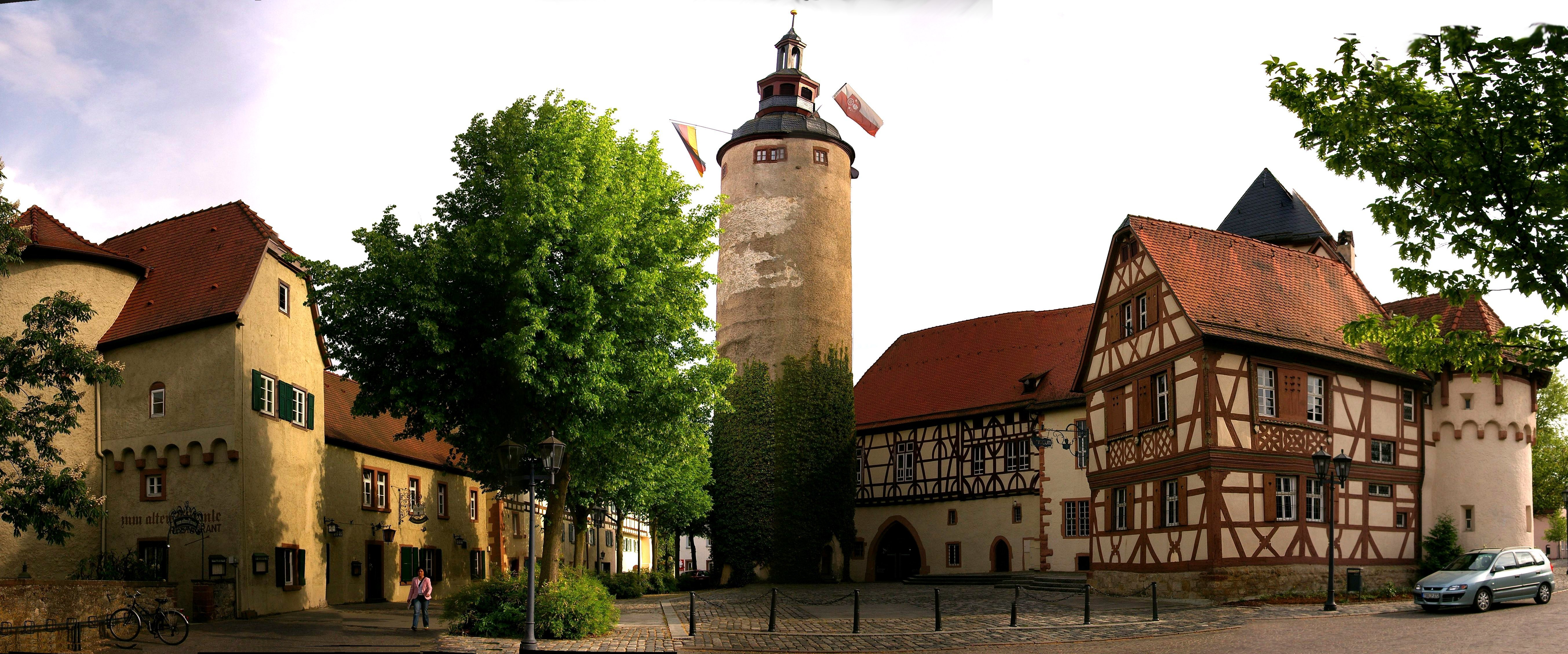
- Centre of the town with the tower and castle

- Coat of arms

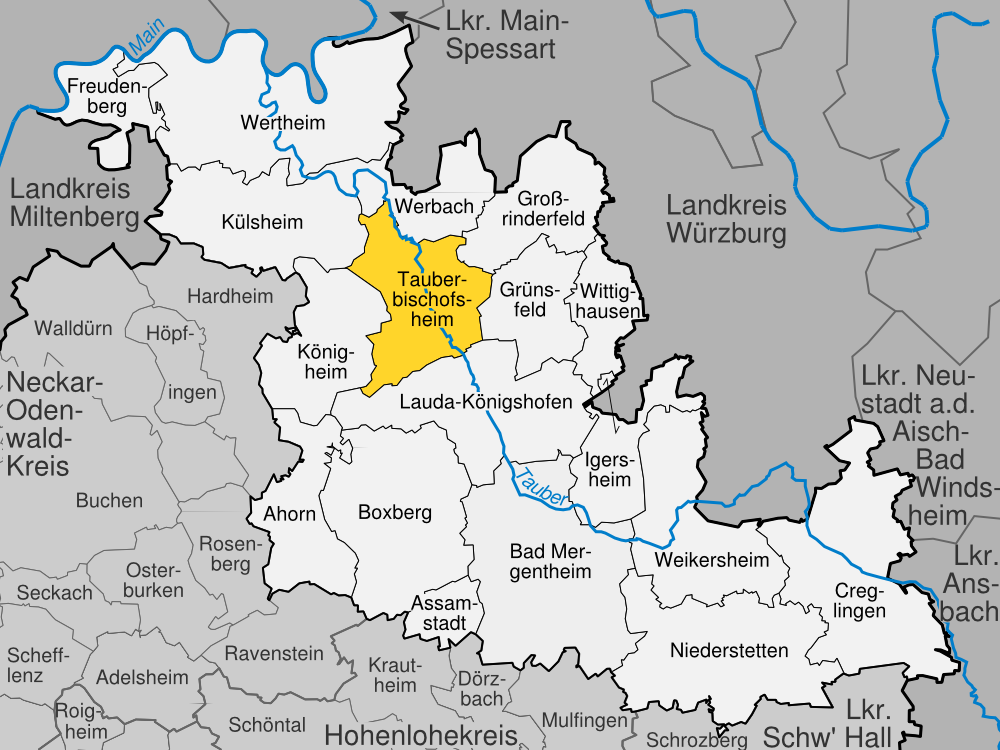
- Location of Tauberbischofsheim within Main-Tauber-Kreis district
- Interactive map of Tauberbischofsheim
- Location within Germany Location within Baden-Württemberg
- Coordinates: 49°37′21″N 09°39′46″E
- Country: Germany
- State: Baden-Württemberg
- Admin. region: Stuttgart
- District: Main-Tauber-Kreis
- Subdivisions: 7 Stadtteile

Government
  - Mayor (2019–27): Anette Schmidt

Area
  - Total: 69.29 km^{2} (26.75 sq mi)
- Elevation: 183 m (600 ft)

Population (2025-12-31)
  - Total: 13,341
  - Density: 192.5/km^{2} (498.7/sq mi)
- Time zone: UTC+01:00 (CET)
  - Summer (DST): UTC+02:00 (CEST)
- Postal codes: 97941
- Dialling codes: 09341
- Vehicle registration: TBB, MGH
- Website: www.tauberbischofsheim.de

Tauberbischofsheim (lit. trans. Bishop's home on the Tauber) (German pronunciation: [taʊbɐˈbɪʃɔfshaɪm]) is a German town in the north-east of Baden-Württemberg on the river Tauber with a population of about 13,200. It is the capital of the Main-Tauber district. It is a popular tourist destination due to its numerous historical buildings, including substantial remains of the medieval town fortifications.

Tauberbischofsheim is also known for its fencers, who have won several Olympic medals and world championships.

== Geography ==
=== Location ===
Tauberbischofsheim is located in the Tauberfranken region of Franconia on the river Tauber.

=== Constituent communities ===
Tauberbischofsheim consists of the main town of Tauberbischofsheim, as well as the Stadtteile Dienstadt, Distelhausen, Dittigheim, Dittwar, Hochhausen and Impfingen. The boundaries of these Stadtteile are the same as that of the former independent municipalities.

Dienstadt has 335 residents and is located west of Tauberbischofsheim. Distelhausen has 983 residents and is located south of Tauberbischofsheim. Dittigheim has 1042 residents and is located south of Tauberbischofsheim. Dittwar has 788 residents and is located south-west of Tauberbischofsheim. Hochhausen has 788 residents and is located north of Tauberbischofsheim. Impfingen has 788 residents and is located north of Tauberbischofsheim.

=== Climate ===
Climate data for Dittigheim, Tauberbischofsheim (1991-2020)
Month	Jan	Feb	Mar	Apr	May	Jun	Jul	Aug	Sep	Oct	Nov	Dec	Year
Daily mean °C (°F)	1.2 (34.2)	1.9 (35.4)	5.5 (41.9)	9.8 (49.6)	13.8 (56.8)	17.3 (63.1)	19.2 (66.6)	18.6 (65.5)	14.1 (57.4)	9.6 (49.3)	5.1 (41.2)	2.1 (35.8)	9.9 (49.7)
Average precipitation mm (inches)	53.0 (2.09)	41.8 (1.65)	49.0 (1.93)	38.5 (1.52)	63.1 (2.48)	58.7 (2.31)	69.4 (2.73)	55.2 (2.17)	47.3 (1.86)	55.9 (2.20)	53.9 (2.12)	64.2 (2.53)	650 (25.59)
Mean monthly sunshine hours	48.5	76.8	130.6	185.9	209.3	219.9	233.9	220.9	163.5	103.9	50.0	37.4	1,680.6
Source: Deutscher Wetterdienst

== History ==
=== Prehistory ===
The area was settled at least since around 3000 B.C., based on prehistoric findings.

=== Middle Ages ===
The town was first mentioned in a biography of Saint Lioba in 836. It bears its name ("bishop's place") due to its close relation to bishop Saint Boniface. Boniface brought his relative Lioba to the town around 735, where she became abbess of a monastery. Boniface founded the convent at Bischofsheim. In 1180 the town's oldest building, the Chapel of St. Peter, was built. Between 1237 and 1245 town rights were granted to Tauberbischofsheim. Around 1280 the Türmersturm-tower and the Kurmainz Castle were constructed. In 1318 the Bischofsheim market was first mentioned in official records.

=== 16th to 18th century ===
From 1525 to 1627 the town was denied self-rule after picking the losing side in the Peasant's War. New municipal laws were introduced by Albrecht, Archbishop of Mainz, severely restricting citizens' rights. In 1629 Franciscan friars settled in Bischofsheim. During the Thirty Years' War Bischofsheim was under Swedish occupation from 1631 to 1635. In 1688 a Latin school was founded by the Franciscans. Later the school became the Matthias-Grünewald Grammar School.

=== 19th century ===
In 1803 Bischofsheim was placed under the rule of the Prince of Leiningen, after having been part of Kurmainz for over 560 years. In 1806 Bischofsheim joined the newly created Grand Duchy of Baden. In 1823 the Franciscan monastery (Klosterhof) was dissolved. Around 1850 the town became known as Tauberbischofsheim. To distinguish the town from other towns named Bischofsheim, the name of the river Tauber was added to the name. The new town hall was built between 1865 and 1867. In 1866, a battle in the Austro-Prussian War took place in and around Tauberbischofsheim between troops from Württemberg and Prussia. Between 1894-95 the "Christuskirche" was built as a Protestant church. From 1910 to 1914 the Catholic Church of St. Martin was reconstructed.

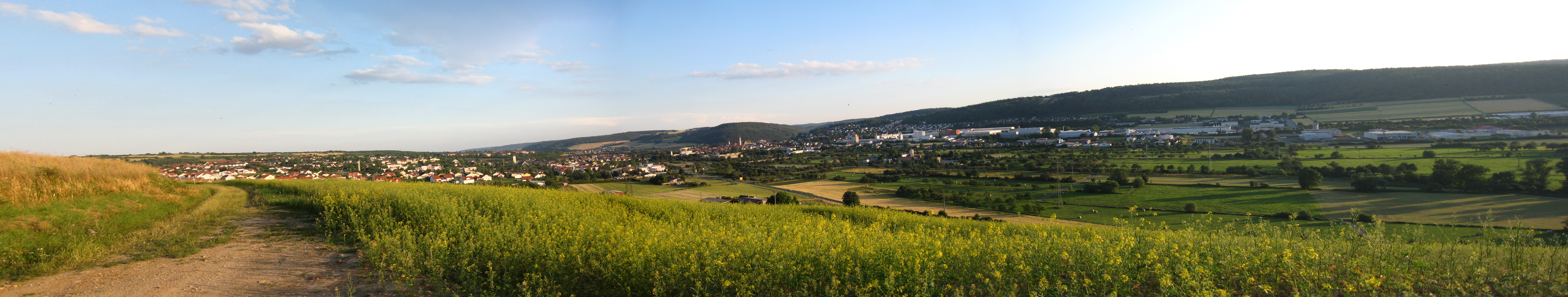
A panorama of Tauberbischofsheim.

=== 20th century ===
The six Stadtteile were incorporated to Tauberbischofsheim during the local government reform in Baden-Württemberg in the 1970s: July 1, 1971: Hochhausen and Impfingen (1 July 1971), Dienstadt (1 January 1972) and Distelhausen, Dittigheim and Dittwar (1 January 1975).

=== History of the Stadtteile ===
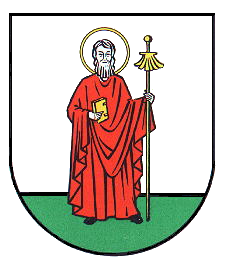
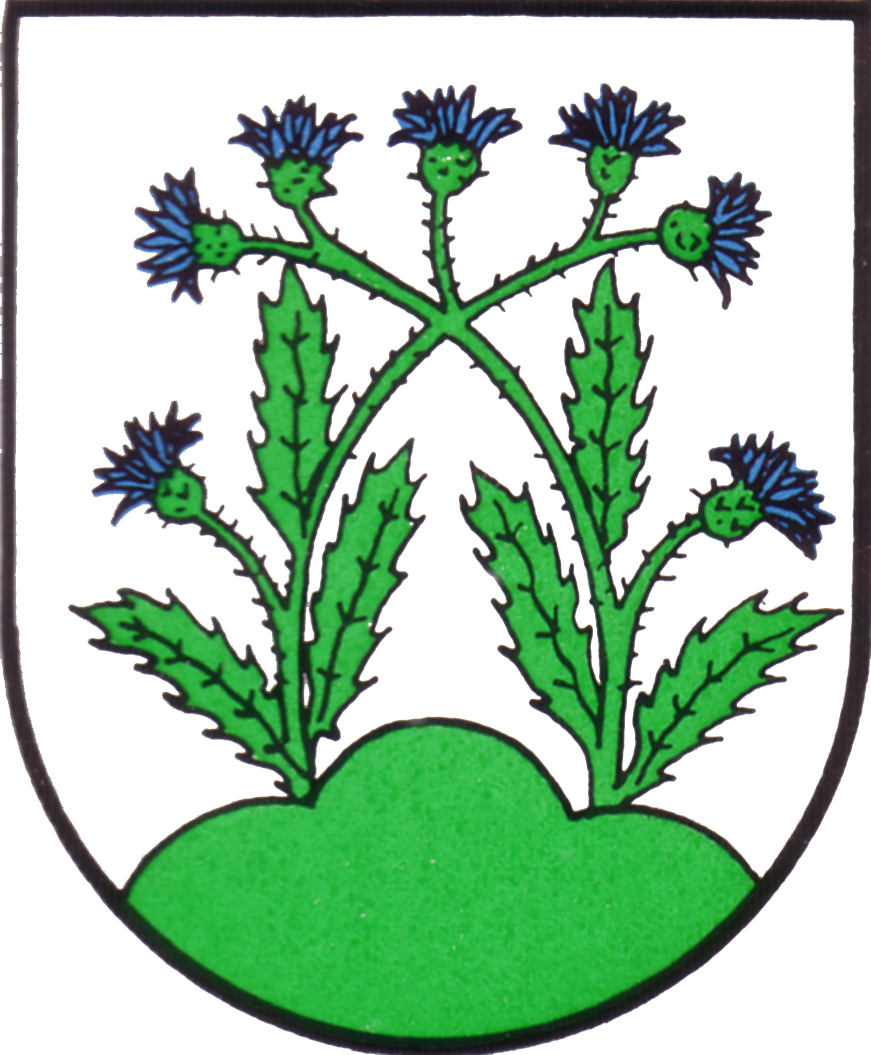
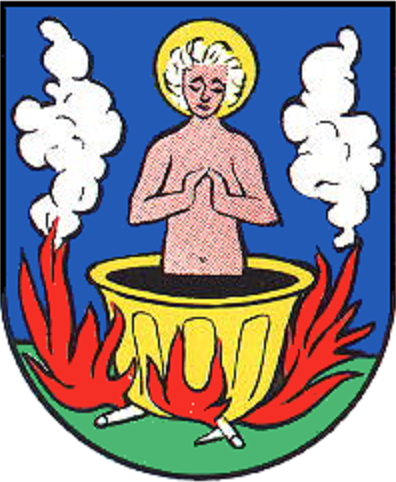
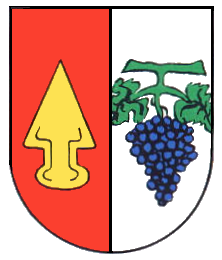
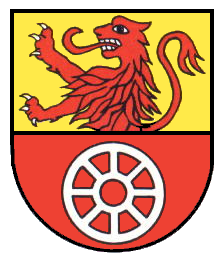
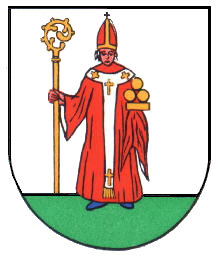
Dienstadt	Dienstadt was first mentioned in 1314 as Diestadt, in 1341 it was renamed Dienstadt.
Distelhausen
Dittigheim	Prehistoric grave finds from the Neolithic period show that the area has been inhabited for 4000 years. Dittigheim was first mentioned in 772. Dittigheim is home to the Baroque church of St. Vitus, which was built in 1748 by Balthasar Neumann, and several ornate shrines.
Dittwar	Dittwar was first mentioned in 1169 as Ditebure (dit (mhd) = people / common / usually; bure (mhd) = farmer / neighbour) . The name evolved to Dydebuor in 1343, Dytbuer in 1368, Dietbur in 1371, Dytewure in 1383, Dietwar in 1407, and finally Dittwar in 1615. The first mention Dittwar is related to the donation of the Castrum Dietebure by Count Henricus de Luden to the Prince-Bishop of Würzburg.
Hochhausen	Hochhausen was first mentioned in 780 in the Codex Eberhardi and the first written record of high Hausen dates back to 1149.
Impfingen

== Governance ==
=== Mayors ===
The mayors of Tauberbischofsheim since 1945 were:

- 1945–1946: August Haun
- 1946–1952: August Otto Bruch
- 1952–1958: Anton Baumann
- 1958–1972: Walter Grosch
- 1973–1980: Hans Dörfle
- 1981–1995: Erich Hollerbach (CDU)
- 1995-2019: Wolfgang Vockel
- since 2019: Anette Schmidt

=== Coat of Arms ===
In a red shield is a silver-white helmet crested by a wheel with seven spokes and attached by four ribbons ending in roses, all of the same colour. According to source the archbishopric of Mainz gained the village of Tauberbischofsheim in 1237 and the fiefdom of a castle in 1316. The archbishops were rulers of the city until 1802. The helmet is symbolizing this fiefdom. The image was taken from seals and was not changed until 1740. 1865 some elements had been added. Over time, the old version was re-established.

== Arts and culture ==
=== Architecture ===
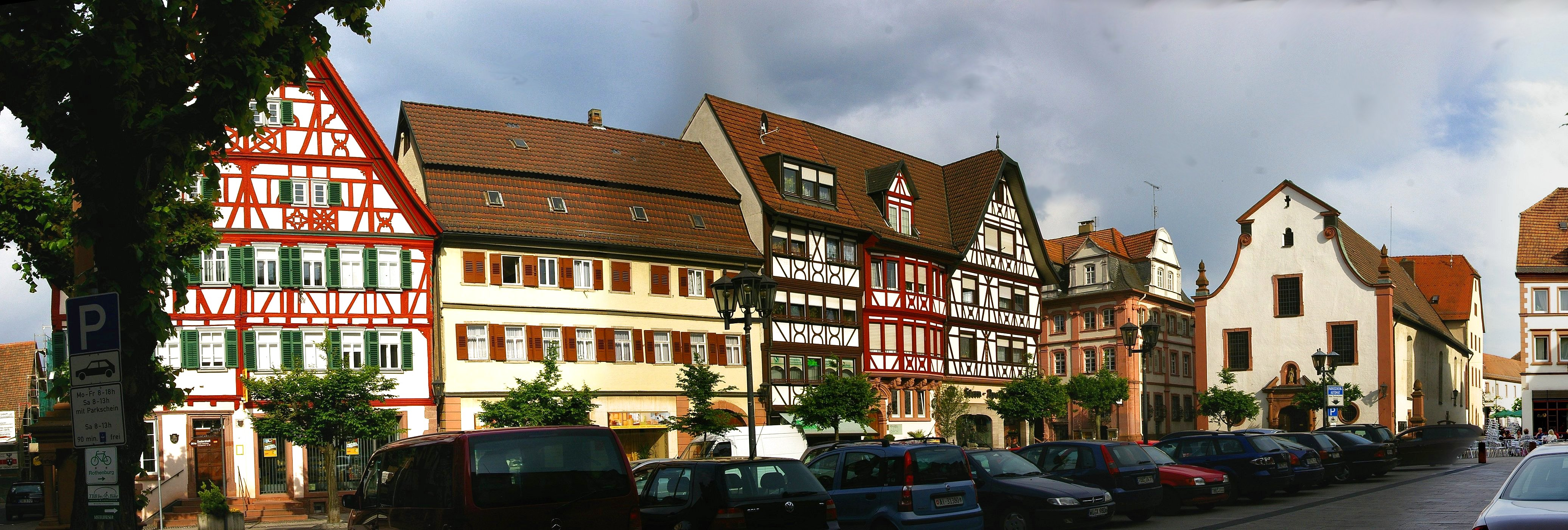
The marketplace.

The old town, which was formerly completely surrounded by a defensive wall, features many historical buildings. The Tauberbischofsheim Castle dates back to second half of the 13th century. The marketplace is encircled by half-timbered houses and the Gothic Revival town hall. The parish church of St. Martin (German: Stadtpfarrkirche St. Martin) was completed in 1914 after its predecessor burnt down. The Gothic Revival church contains works of art from many past churches including an altar from the Ulm workshop of Niklaus Weckmann the Elder with panel paintings by Hans Schäufelein, a Madonna by Hans Multscher and a copy of the Tauberbischofsheim altarpiece by Matthias Grünewald. The oldest church in the city is the Peterskapelle, built in the 12th century. The Badischer Hof is the oldest hotel in Tauberbischofsheim. It was built in 1733.

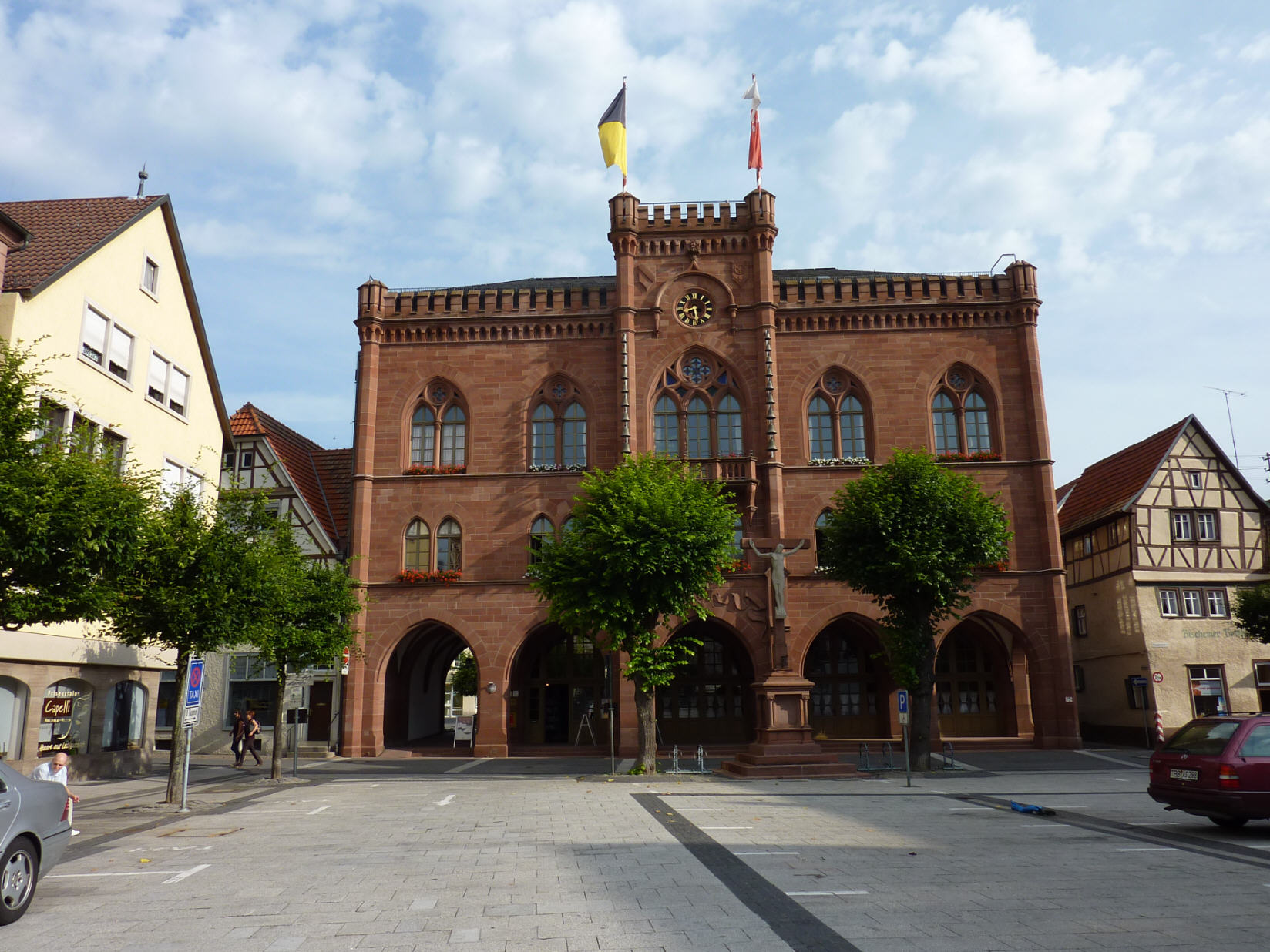
The town hall.

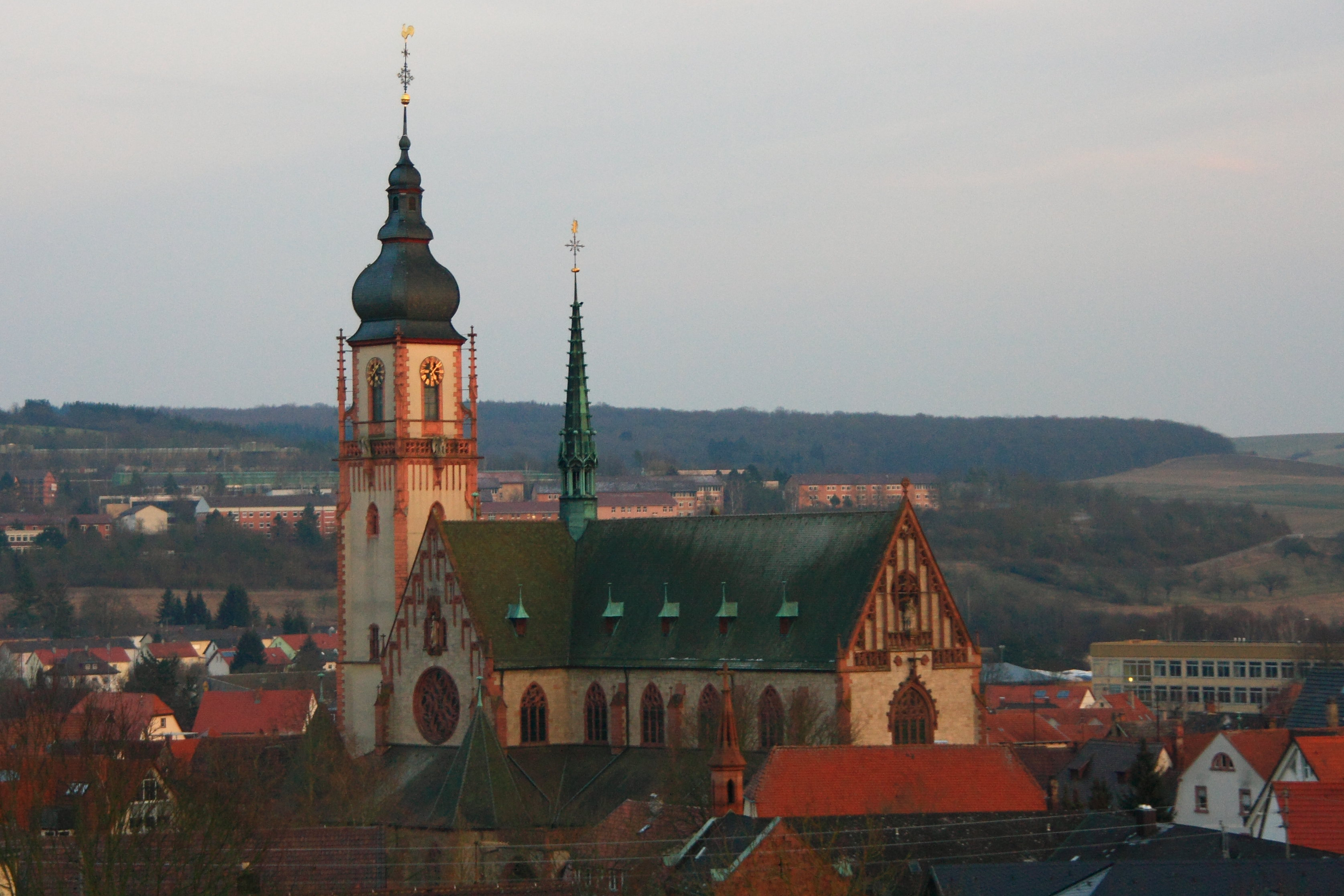
Stadtpfarrkirche St. Martin

For many years the town was home to the Tauberbischofsheim altarpiece, a monumental piece of German renaissance art by Master Mathis now kept in the Karlsruhe Kunsthalle.

=== Museums ===
In Tauberbischofsheim and its suburbs there are the following museums:

- Pharmacy Museum
- Farm Museum, Distelhausen
- Village Museum, Dittwar
- Village Museum, Impfingen
- School Furniture Museum, Tauberbischofsheim
- Tauber Franconian countryside museum in the Kurmainz Castle, Tauberbischofsheim

=== Regular events ===
Every May there is a traditional Maypole festival at Wörth square. In the same month there is an Italian Night at the market place.

The "Tauberbischofsheimer Altstadtfest" (old town festival) is traditionally on the first weekend of July, from Friday to Sunday.

During Advent, the traditional Tauberbischofsheim Christmas Market is a popular meeting place at the castle square.

=== Culinary specialties ===
Tauberbischofsheim and its environments are characterized in the lowlands by extensive fruit and wine growing areas. Here Tauber valley wines and sparkling wines are produced. Also beers (in the Distelhäuser brewery in the district Distelhausen), fruit brandies, regional cider and apple juice are produced. Regional specialties include Tauber trout, Boeuf de Hohenlohe, Tauber valley country pig products, Tauber valley lamb and regional Grünkern.

== Sports ==
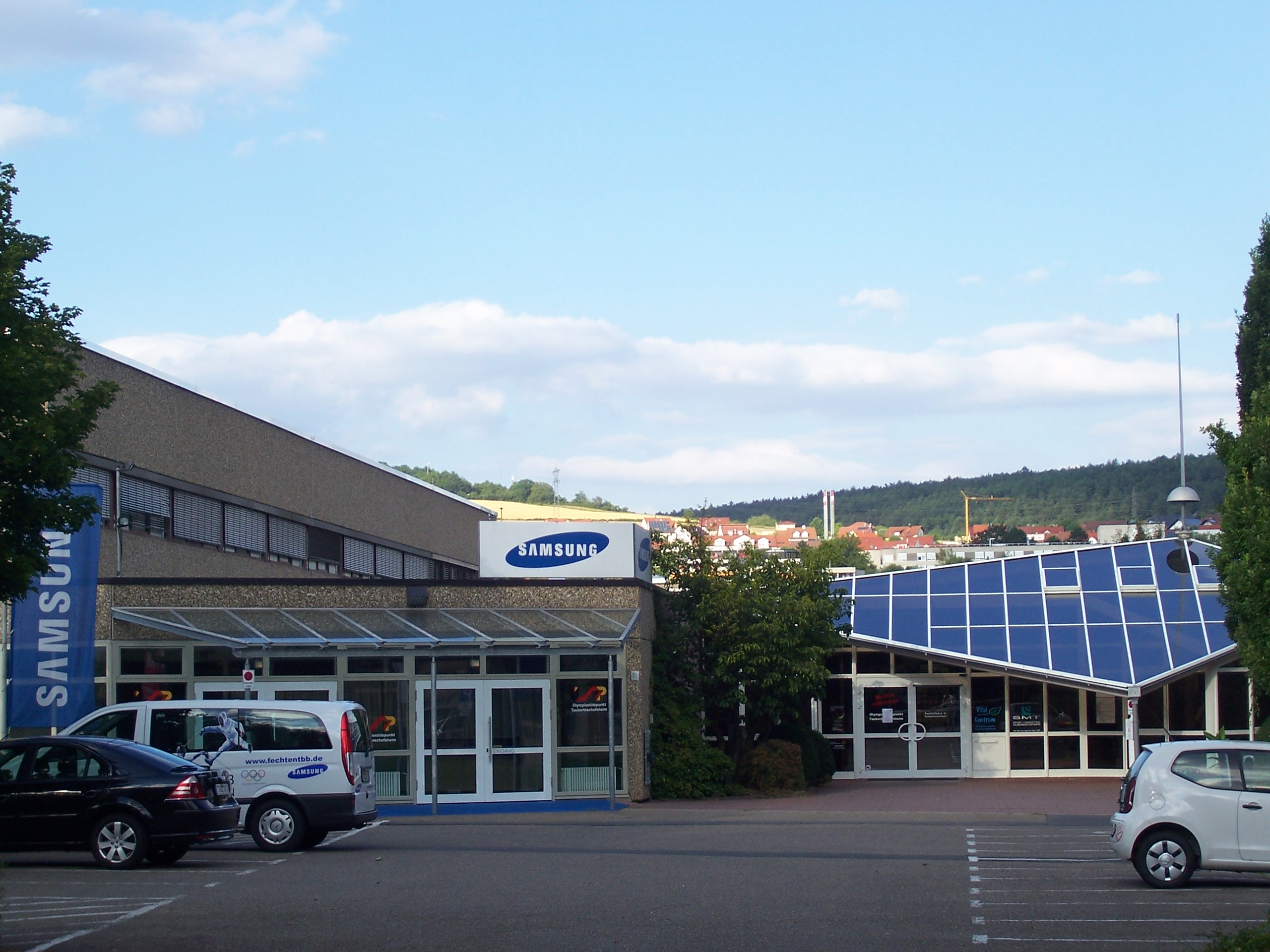
Entrance of the Fencing-Club Tauberbischofheim's training camp

=== Fencing ===
The Fencing-Club Tauberbischofsheim (commonly known as FC Tauberbischofsheim) is the most successful fencing club in the world, based on its medal successes in international sporting events. Medalists have included Thomas Bach, Matthias Behr, Anja Fichtel, Zita Funkenhauser, Jürgen Hehn, Harald Hein and Alexander Pusch. The FC Tauberbischofsheim is based at the Tauberbischofsheim Olympic team training camp for the sport of fencing.

=== Other sports ===
The TSV 1863 Tauberbischofsheim e. V is a popular sports club with 2,304 members (as of 2 October 2014) with eleven different departments for the following sports: Football (soccer), Judo, Gymnastics, Badminton, Basketball, Table tennis, Tennis, Rock n roll, Volleyball, Handball and Karate.

== Economy ==
=== Tourism ===
Tauberbischofsheim is located on the Romantic Road (German: Romantische Straße), a tourist route that connects many scenic cities and towns. The Romantic Road is the oldest tourist route in Germany. Tauberbischofsheim is also part of the Siegfried Road.

=== Others ===
Diestelhausen is home to the Distelhäuser Brewery.

== Infrastructure ==
=== Transport ===
The Taubertalradweg along the Tauber River connects Tauberbischofsheim in one direction with Bad Mergentheim and Rothenburg ob der Tauber (in the other direction with Wertheim).

=== Health ===
Tauberbischofsheim's hospital has a public indoor pool with sauna and exercise pool.

The solar-heated Frankenbad is a municipal swimming pool.

== Education ==
The Christian-Morgenstern-Grundschule and the Grundschule am Schloss are the primary schools in Tauberbischofsheim.

Tauberbischofsheim operates one college-track high school (Matthias-Grünewald-Gymnasium) and two non-college-track high schools (Riemenschneider-Realschule, Pestalozzi-Werkrealschule). There is also one special-education school run by the town (Christophorus-Förderschule).

The Kaufmännische Schule Tauberbischofsheim (with Wirtschaftsgymnasium) and the Gewerbliche Schule Tauberbischofsheim are vocational schools or professional training schools run by the Main-Tauber-Kreis.

There are also two private schools: Volkshochschule Mittleres Taubertal e.V. and Euro Akademie Tauberbischofsheim.

== Notable people ==
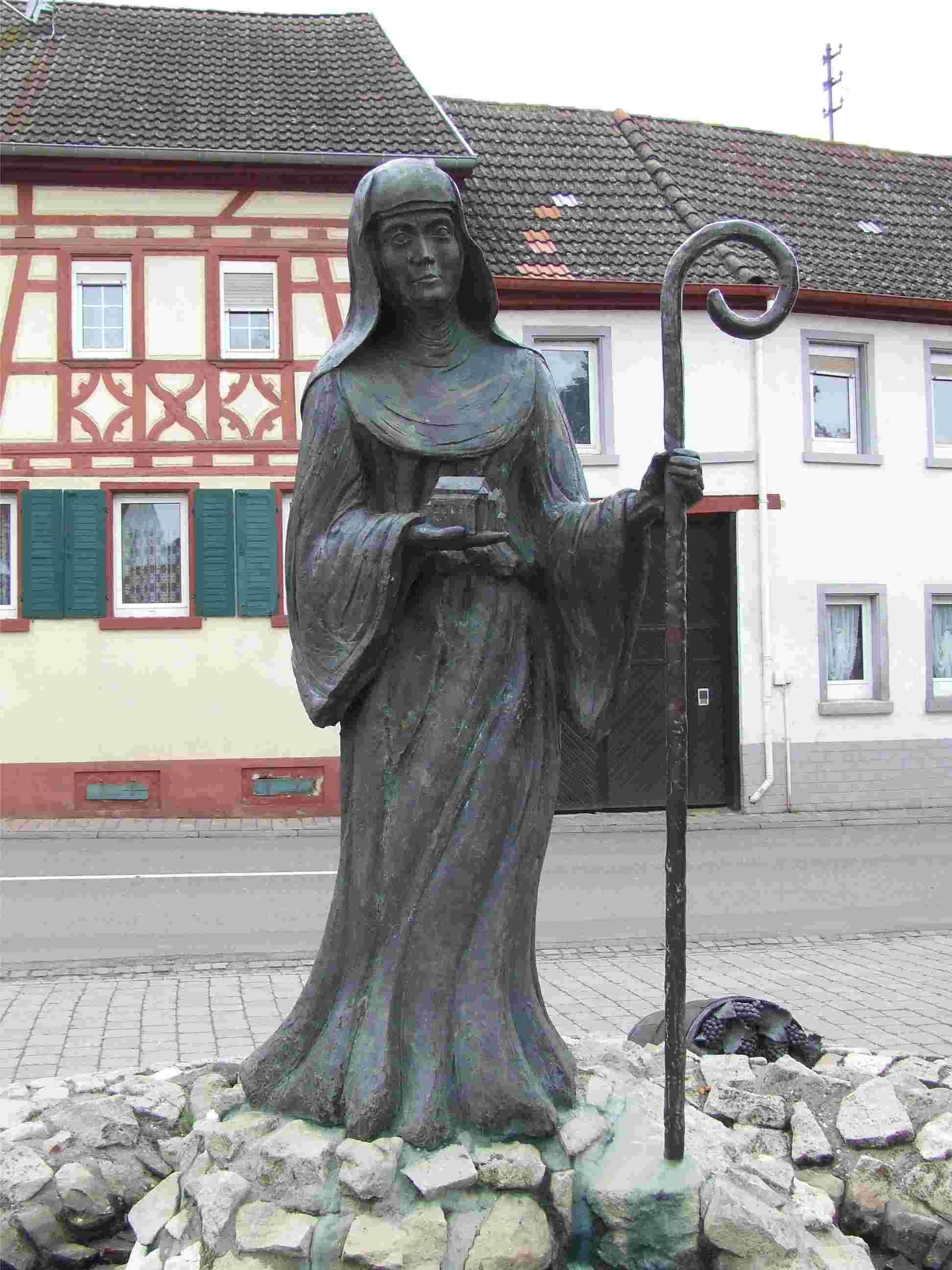
St Leoba

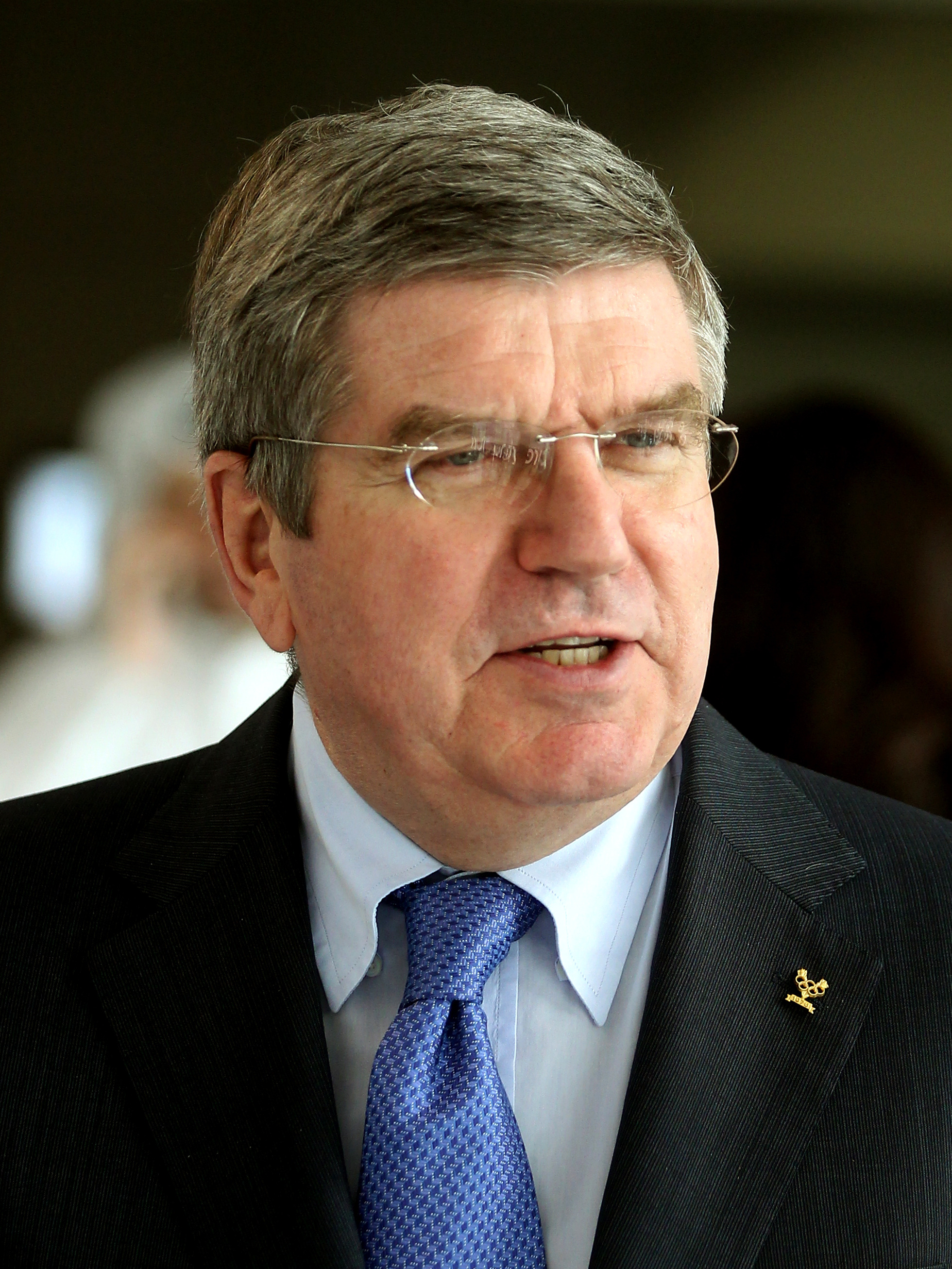
Thomas Bach, 2014

- Leoba, (ca. 710–782), established a local convent where she became the abbess
- Johannes Sichardus (1499–1552), a humanist, jurist and university law professor
- Jakob Löwenstein (1799–1869), rabbi and writer, died locally
- Richard Trunk (1879–1968), a German composer, pianist, conductor and critic.

=== Sport ===
- Emil Beck, (1935–2006), national fencing team head coach, local honorary citizen
- Reinhold Behr (born 1948), fencer, silver medallist at the 1976 Summer Olympics
- Harald Hein (1950–2008), Olympic champion and world champion in fencing
- Hanns Jana (born 1952), fencer, team silver medallist at the 1976 Summer Olympics
- Thomas Bach, (born 1953), president of the IOC from 2013 to 2025; gold medallist at the 1976 Summer Olympics
- Matthias Behr (born 1955), Olympic champion and world champion in fencing
- Gerhard Heer (born 1955), former fencer, team gold medal at the 1984 Summer Olympics
- Alexander Pusch (born 1955), Olympic champion and world champion in épée fencing
- Sabine Bischoff (1958–2013), fencer, trained locally, team gold medallist at the 1984 Summer Olympics,
- Gerry Ehrmann (born 1959), football goalkeeper, played 303 games
- Mathias Gey (born 1960), fencer, team silver medallist at the 1984 & 1988 Summer Olympics
- Frank Beck (born 1961), former fencer, team silver medallist at the 1984 Summer Olympics.
- Ulrich Schreck (born 1962), Olympic champion and world champion in fencing
- Anja Fichtel (born 1968), Olympic champion and world champion in fencing
- Annette Dobmeier (born 1968), former fencer, team silver medallist at the 1992 Summer Olympics
- Sebastian Bachmann (born 1986), foil fencer, bronze medallist at the 2012 Summer Olympics.
