= Tauber Franconia =

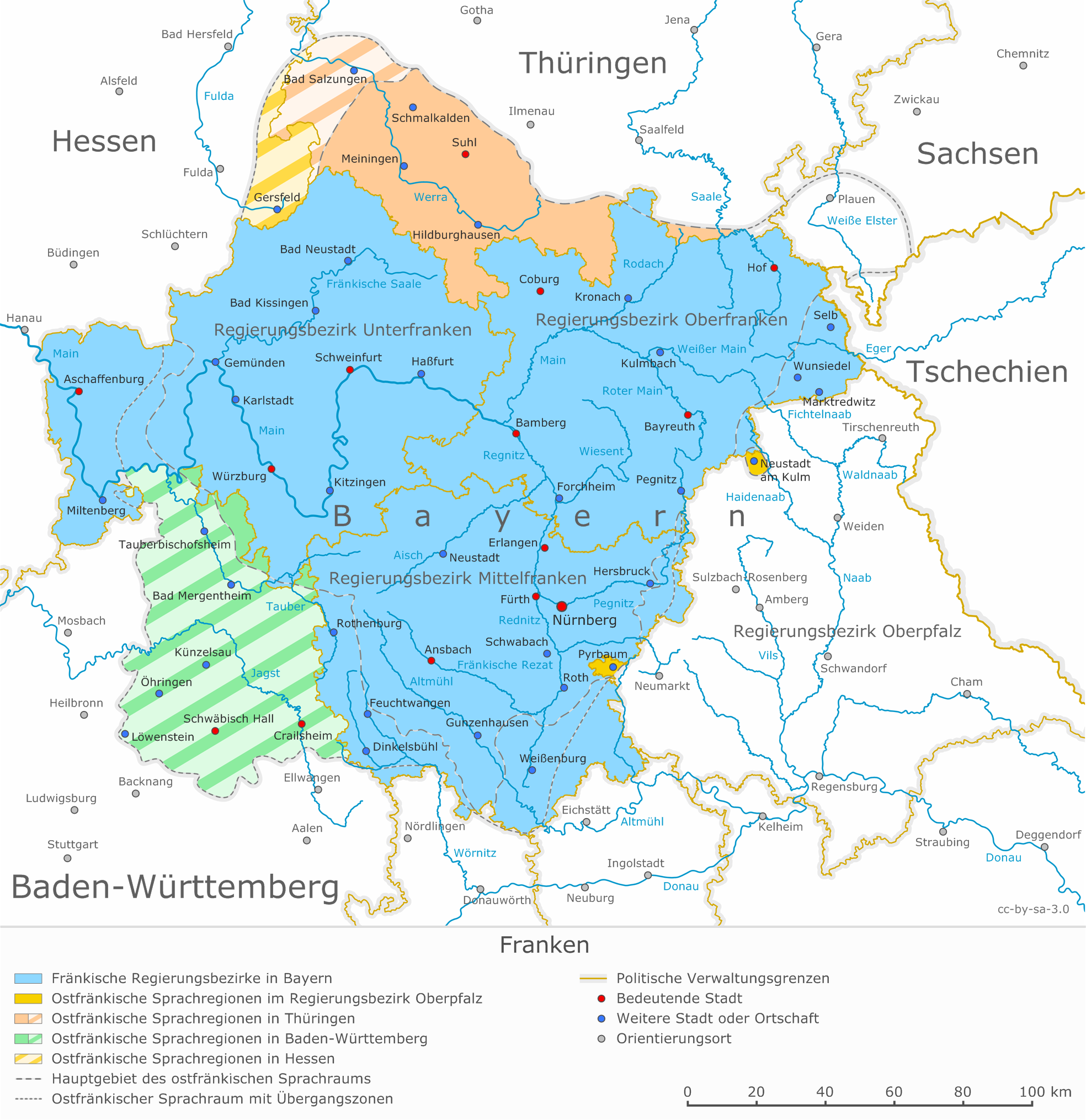
East Franconian language regions in Baden-Württemberg (yellow) overlap roughly with Tauber Franconia

The region of Tauber Franconia (German: Tauberfranken) is a part of the region of Franconia, most of which lies in the German state of Baden-Württemberg. Tauber Franconia is almost coextensive with the county of Main-Tauber-Kreis, which is bisected by the River Tauber, but a small part also belongs to the Bavarian county of Würzburg. The upper reaches of the Tauber flow through 13 villages in seven municipalities in the county of Ansbach, including the well known town of Rothenburg ob der Tauber. The source of the Tauber is in the county of Schwäbisch Hall. The most important towns in Tauber Franconia are Wertheim am Main, Tauberbischofsheim, Lauda-Königshofen and Bad Mergentheim on the Baden-Württemberg side, and Röttingen on the Bavarian side.
