= Main-Tauber-Kreis =

Coordinates: 49.57°N 9.71°E

Main-Tauber
- District
- Flag Coat of arms
- Country: Germany
- State: Baden-Württemberg
- Adm. region: Stuttgart
- Capital: Tauberbischofsheim

Government
  - District admin. (2021–29): Christoph Schauder (CDU)

Area
  - Total: 1,304.1 km^{2} (503.5 sq mi)

Population (31 December 2025)
  - Total: 132,876
  - Density: 101.89/km^{2} (263.90/sq mi)
- Time zone: UTC+01:00 (CET)
  - Summer (DST): UTC+02:00 (CEST)
- Vehicle registration: TBB, MGH
- Website: https://www.main-tauber-kreis.de

Main-Tauber-Kreis (German pronunciation: [maɪ̯nˈtaʊ̯bɐˌkʁaɪ̯s]) is a Landkreis (district) in the northeast of Baden-Württemberg, Germany. Neighboring districts are (from northwest clockwise) Miltenberg, Main-Spessart, Würzburg, Neustadt (Aisch)-Bad Windsheim and Ansbach (all in Bavaria), and the districts of Schwäbisch Hall, Hohenlohe and Neckar-Odenwald.

== History ==
Traces of human population in the area were found to go back as early as 5500 B.C.

Throughout the 18th and 19th century, during the so-called Kleinstaaterei, southern parts of today's district were part of the free imperial city of Rothenburg ob der Tauber, the Principality of Ansbach, while the city of Weikersheim played a major role in the history of the Hohenlohe dynasty and temporarily was one of its seats. Later, the biggest part of the district was part of the Bishopric of Würzburg until 1803.

Bad Mergentheim belonged to the Teutonic order and Tauberbischofsheim, the districts capitcal, was part of Kurmainz from 1237 to 1803.

=== Coat of arms and flag ===
Historical affiliations of the territory reflect in the coat of arms. They show the symbols of the three of the historical states to which the area of the district belonged. The Bishopric of Würzburg is represented by the red and white field divided by a line with three peaks, which was originally the coat of arms of Franconia. The wheel is the symbol of the Archbishopric of Mainz; the cross is the symbol of the Teutonic Order.

The coat of arms are officially recognized by the state of Baden-Württemberg since 19 March 1974. The corresponding flag was authorized by the Regierungspräsidium Stuttgart on 28 November 1989.

=== District in modern Germany ===
The district originated in 1973 with the merging of the districts of Bad Mergentheim, Tauberbischofsheim and parts of the district of Buchen. At first called the district of Tauber, it took its current name, the district of Main-Tauber, in 1974. The name comes from the two primary rivers in the district, the Main and the Tauber.

== Geography ==
The Main forms the northern border of the district, while its affluent Tauber flows through the district from southeast to north. The north of the district covers part of the Odenwald mountains, while the southern area is called Bauland.

=== Area ===
The Main-Tauber Kreis has a total area of 1304.1 km^{2}, that is distributed as follows:

- Settlement and traffic area: 136,3 km^{2} (10,4%)
- Recreational area: 5,9 km^{2} (0,5%)
- Agricultural area: 765,4 km^{2} (58,7%)
- Forest: 386,2 km^{2} (29,6%)
- Water: 10,5 km^{2} (0,8%)

== Cities and municipalities ==
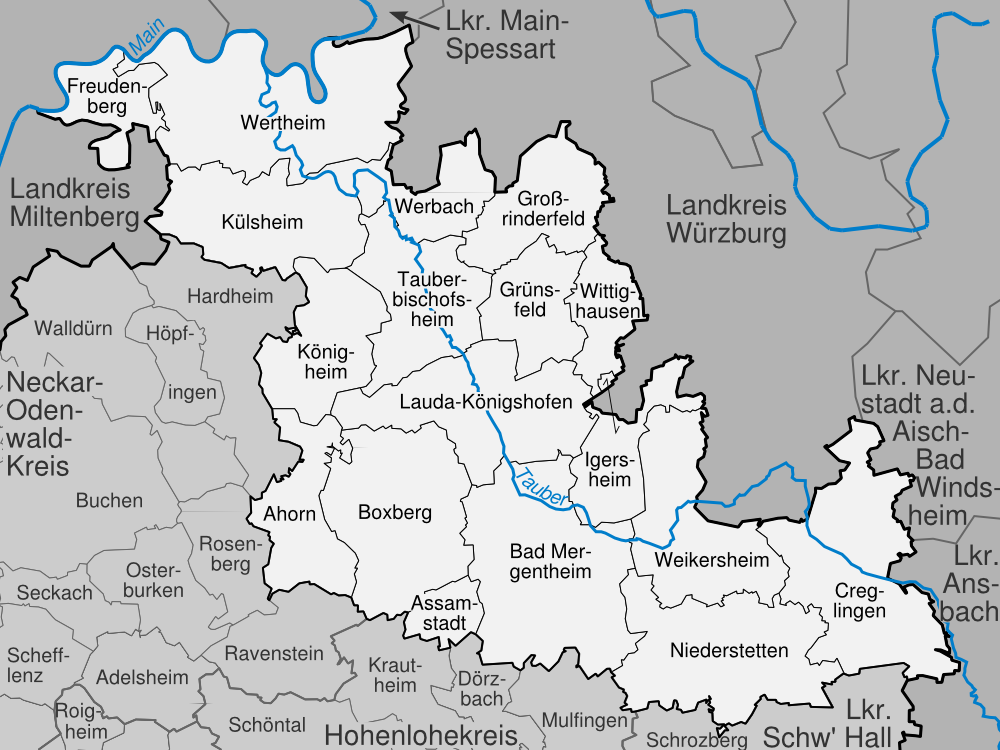
Clickable map of towns and municipalities in the district

Cities
1. Bad Mergentheim
2. Boxberg
3. Creglingen
4. Freudenberg am Main
5. Grünsfeld
6. Külsheim
7. Lauda-Königshofen
8. Niederstetten
9. Tauberbischofsheim
10. Weikersheim
11. Wertheim am Main
Administrative districts
1. Bad Mergentheim
2. Boxberg
3. Grünsfeld
4. Tauberbischofsheim
Municipalities
1. Ahorn
2. Assamstadt
3. Großrinderfeld
4. Igersheim
5. Königheim
6. Werbach
7. Wittighausen

== Demographics ==
As of 31 December 2022, 134,745 people live in the district, which corresponds to 1.19% of Baden-Württemberg's total population. Foreign born residents make up 12 percent of the population and people aged 65 or older make up 23 percent.

== Infrastructure ==
=== Roads ===
The total length of the road network in the district is about 909 kilometres, of which about half (463 km) are county roads (Kreisstraßen), just over a third (347 km) are state roads (Landesstraßen), and about 10 per cent (99 km) are federal highways (Bundestraßen).

=== Public transport ===
Around 110 public transport buses are operated by the VGMT (Verkehrsgesellschaft Main-Tauber) in the district. The VGMT was founded 1997 and serves around 900 to 1000 stations today.

== International relations ==
Comparable with the concept of twin towns, the Kreis has partnerships with:

- Tolna County, Hungary
- Bautzen District, Saxony
- Zabkowice Slaskie, Poland
- Transporthubschrauberregiment 30, formal partnership with a part of the German Army Aviation Corps.
