= New Holland Agriculture =

Agricultural machinery manufacturer

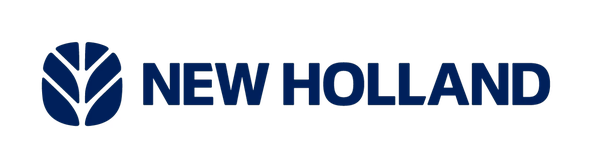
- Type: Subsidiary
- Industry: Agricultural machinery
- Founded: 1895; 131 years ago in New Holland, Pennsylvania, U.S.
- Headquarters: Turin, Piedmont, Italy
- Key people: Carlo Lambro, Brand President
- Products: Tractors; Combine harvesters Haying Equipment; Balers; Grape Harvesters
- Parent: CNH Industrial
- Website: agriculture.newholland.com

New Holland is a global full-line agricultural machinery manufacturer founded in New Holland, Pennsylvania, and now based in Turin, Italy. New Holland's products include tractors, combine harvesters, balers, forage harvesters, self-propelled sprayers, haying tools, seeding equipment, hobby tractors, utility vehicles and implements, and grape harvesters. Originally formed as the New Holland Machine Company in 1895, the company is now owned by CNH Industrial N.V., a company incorporated in the Netherlands.

New Holland equipment is manufactured at 18 plants globally (as well as six joint ventures in the Americas, Asia, and the Middle East). The current administrative headquarters are in Turin, Italy, with New Holland, Pennsylvania serving as the brand's North American headquarters.

New Holland also owns trademarks for innovations on its products such as the ABS Super Steer system, Opti Fan System, Intellifill system, and more.

== History ==
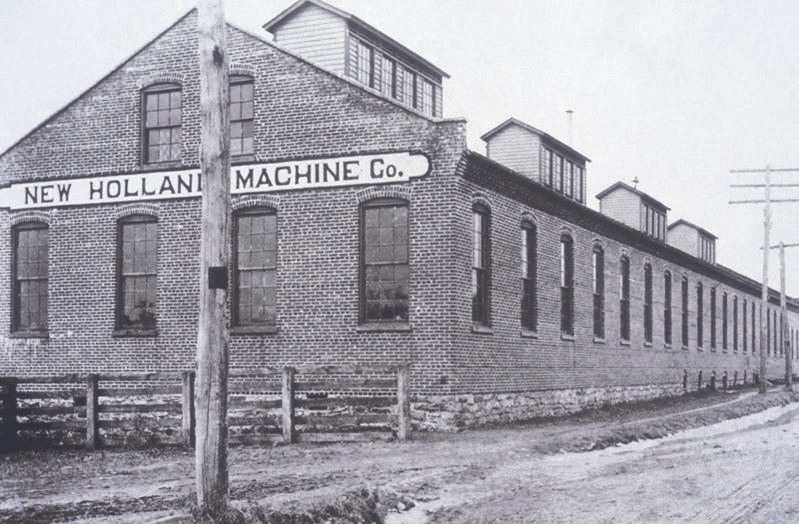
The first New Holland plant in New Holland, PA

New Holland history is the sum and integration of four agricultural brands that merged: Ford, FIAT Trattori, Claeys, and New Holland.

=== Founding ===
New Holland Machine Company was founded in a horse barn in 1895 by Abe Zimmerman^{[2]} in New Holland, Pennsylvania, and began producing agricultural products, including a feed mill, to help the local farming community. The company was incorporated in 1903.

In 1947, the company changed its name to Sperry New Holland, due to a takeover by the Sperry Rand Corporation. The same year, it made a major breakthrough in hay harvesting technology with the introduction of the haybine mower conditioner (which remained in production until 2023). In 1964, Sperry New Holland bought a major interest in Claeys.

Claeys was founded in 1906 by Leon Claeys, a Belgian mechanic. This firm started to build threshing machines, and in 1909, built a factory in Zedelgem, Belgium, where one of New Holland's plants is still producing harvesting products. By the 1960s, Claeys was one of the biggest combine manufacturers in Europe.^{[3]}

In 1975, Sperry New Holland introduced the world's first twin-rotor combine, a successful technology that is still used today.

=== Ford ===
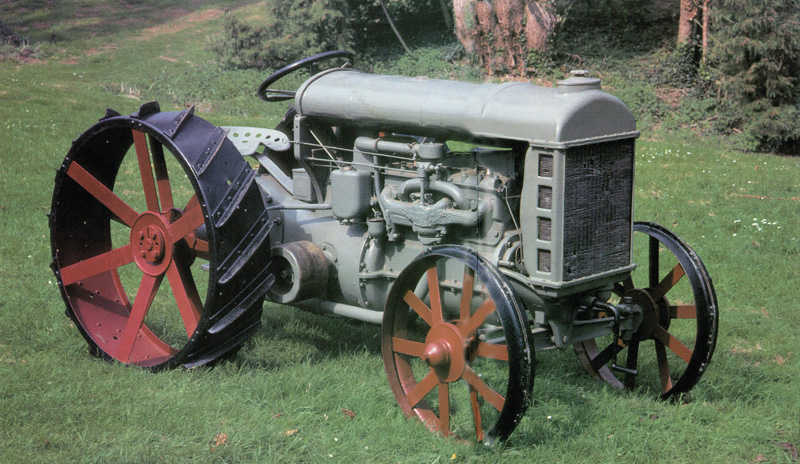
A Ford Tractor Model F, produced since 1917

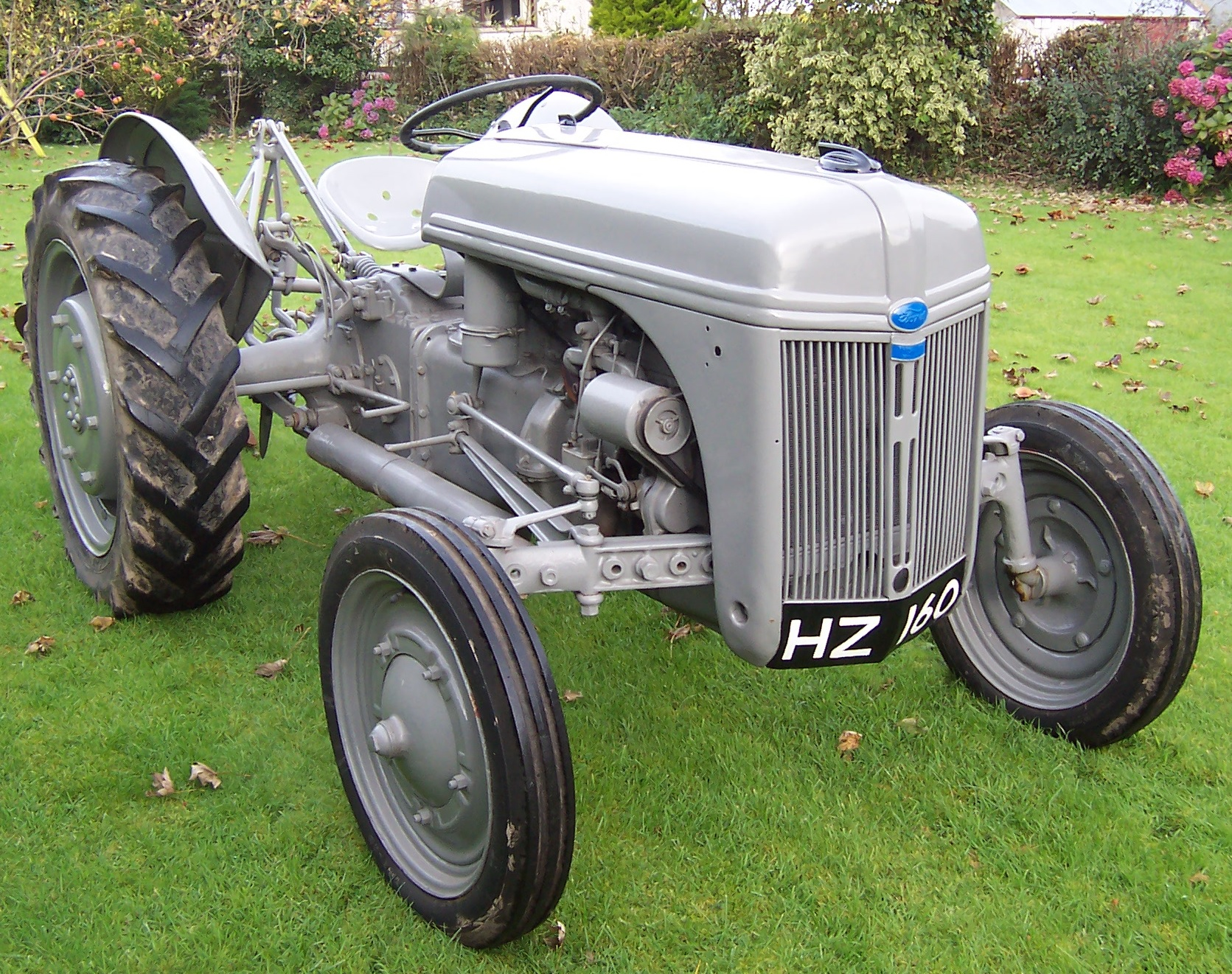
A 1944 Ford-Ferguson Tractor Model 2NAN, produced 1939-1947 by the Ford Motor Company in the USA

In 1986, Ford bought Sperry New Holland and formed Ford New Holland Inc.

Before this acquisition, Ford had a long history in agricultural machinery production. In 1907, Ford came out with the prototype for the world's first mass-produced, gasoline-powered tractor, named an "automobile plow". Ten years later, this tractor went into actual production. It was renamed the Fordson Model F, and produced by a new business, Henry Ford & Son Company.

In 1939, Ford introduced the three-point hitch (three-point linkage) on the 'N' tractor series, known as the Ford Tractor with Ferguson System or Ford-Ferguson the world first mass produced Ferguson System tractor. A very successful tractor family, so much so that every tractor today is based on them. In the 1980s, Ford was one of the major players, and its tractor division had been responsible for a number of industry innovations, including the use of power hydraulics, rubber pneumatic tires, diesel engines, and the three-point hitch. This hitch was originally developed by Harry Ferguson, but was widely used on Ford tractor.

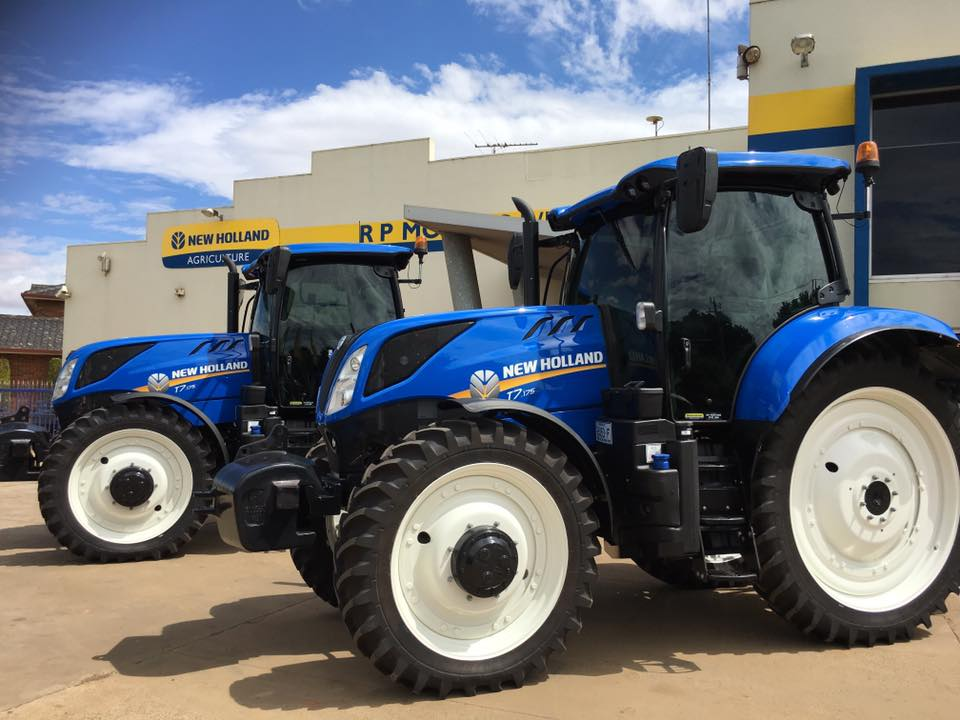
T7 Series Tractors, at a New Holland dealership in Australia, R.P. Motors Pty. Ltd.

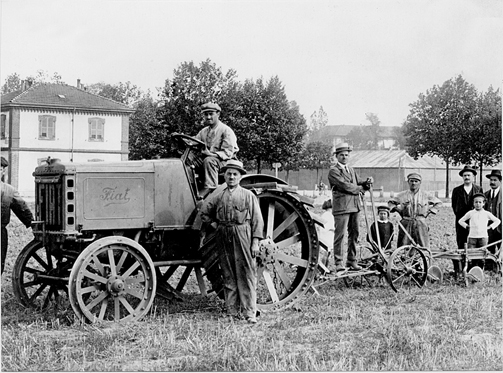
FIAT produced tractors since 1918

=== FIAT Trattori ===
Fiat Trattori was present in the agriculture machinery industry since the beginning of the 20th century. In 1918, the FIAT Model 702 tractor was launched and went into full production a year later at the car and truck plant in Turin, and won the International Ploughing Contest in Senlis (France). Model 702 was the first FIAT agricultural tractor, as well as the first Italian tractor to be built on an industrial scale. In the 1930s, FIAT's founder, Senator Giovanni Agnelli, wanted his tractor to become an integral part of Italy's agriculture, so he began an association with the Italian agricultural co-operatives. The company kept on growing, and by the end of the 1970s, FIAT Trattori had built over a million tractors.

In the 1980s, FIAT Trattori acquired Braud, a French company founded in 1870, which introduced the stationary threshers to farmers in Western France in 1895. In 1975, Braud launched his first grape harvester, model 1020. This was further improved with Braud 1014, the best-selling grape harvester in the history of the vineyard, with over 2000 units sold in less than four years.

With the purchase of an 80% interest in Ford New Holland in 1991 by FIAT, New Holland became a global full-line producer and the integration process was completed at the official launch of the brand at the worldwide convention in Orlando, Florida, in 1996.

=== CNH ===
Under the ownership of FIAT, New Holland N.V. and Case Corporation merged in 1999, giving birth to CNH. Due to antitrust policies, New Holland had to divest Laverda and the Versatile tractor plant in Winnipeg, Manitoba, Canada.

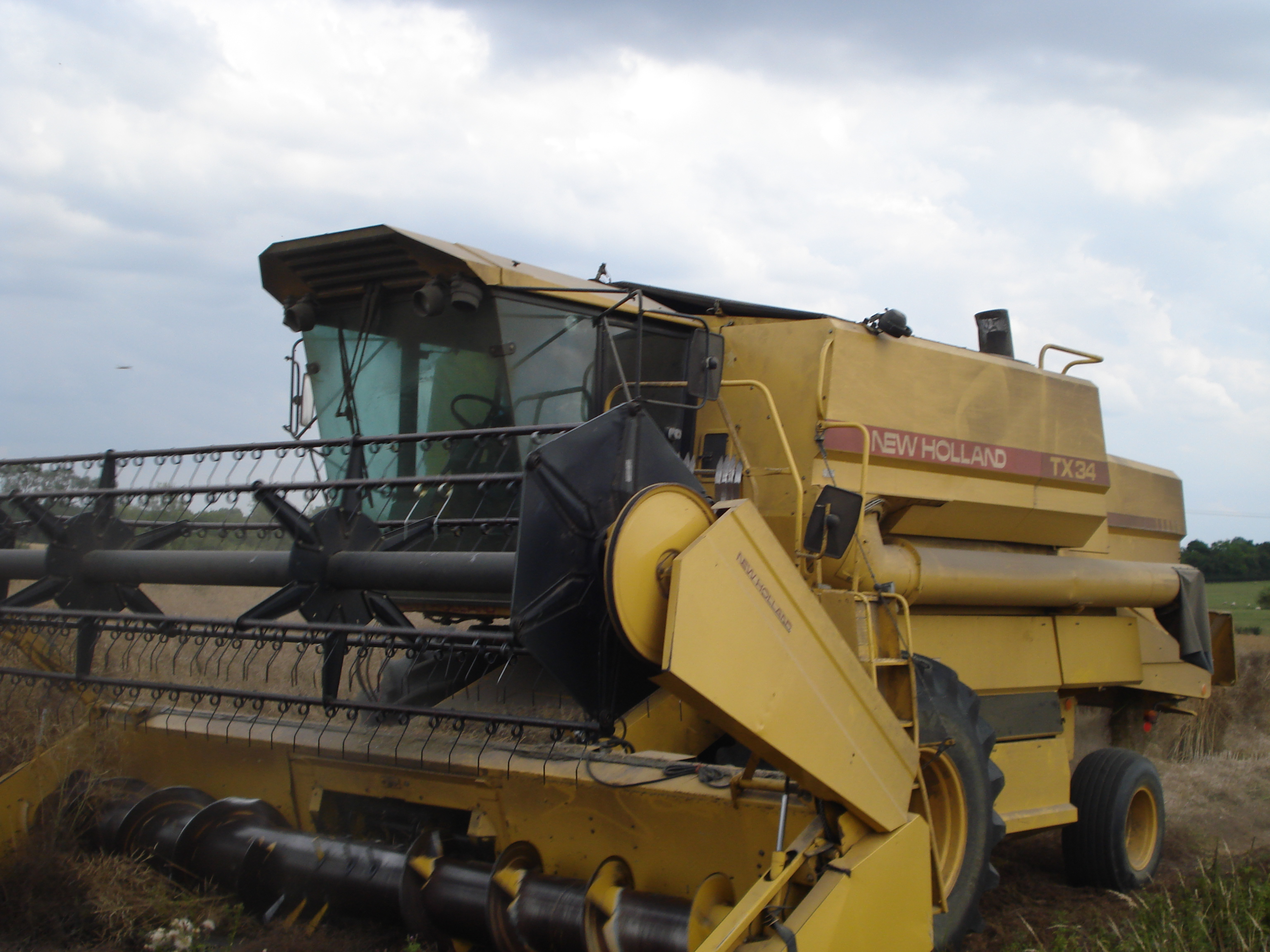
New Holland TX34 harvesting oilseed rape

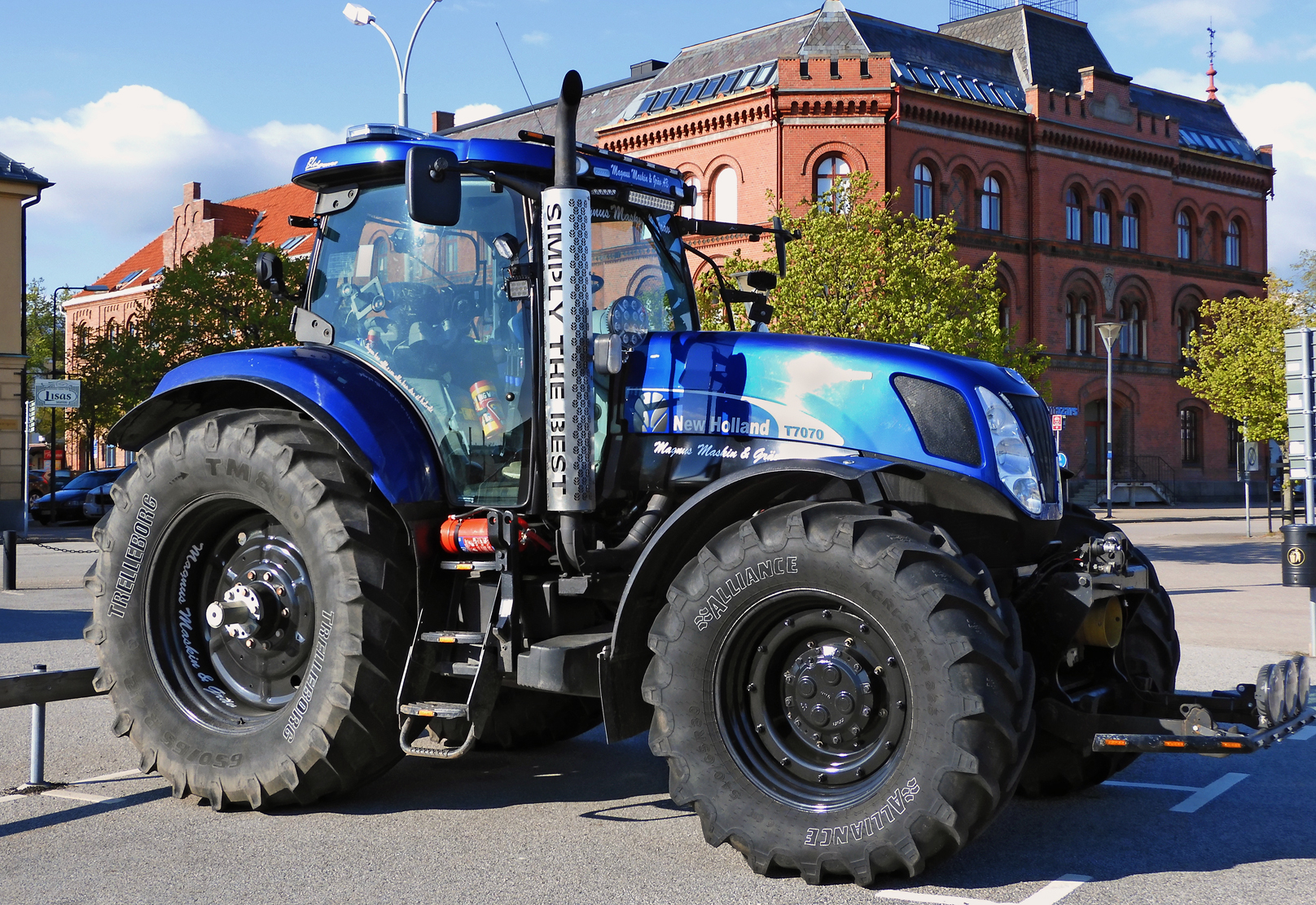
New Holland T7070 2009.

Following the 1993 purchase, the joint venture signed between the Ford Motor Company and the Mexican Quimmco Group in 1990 was transferred to the New Holland company. In 1999, the name of the company was changed to CNH de México.

New Holland FIAT India Pvt. Ltd., previously New Holland Tractors India (Pvt.) Ltd., was established as a 100% subsidiary of CNH Global NV in 1996. The factory is situated in the Greater Noida area, near New Delhi.

=== Acquisitions and partnerships ===
In 1998, New Holland acquired Bizon, a combine harvester manufacturer based in Płock, Poland. It designed machines for harvesting cereals, rape seed, maize, sunflower seed, and other crops. Bizon held about 60% of the Polish combined harvester market and had begun sales expansion in Latin America, Pakistan, Belarus, and Ukraine.

In 1998, New Holland signed a joint venture with Türk Traktör, a company belonging to the Koç Group, Turkey's largest industrial conglomerate. The factory based in Ankara had already been producing FIAT tractors since the previous joint venture with the FIAT Group in 1967. In 2011, the factory celebrated the production of its 600 thousandth tractor.

Shanghai New Holland Agricultural Machinery Corporation Ltd. was established on January 1, 2002, as a joint venture bringing together CNH, Shanghai Tractor, and Internal Combustion Engine Corporation, an industry leader in the Chinese market. Today, it is one of China's largest joint ventures for agricultural machinery.

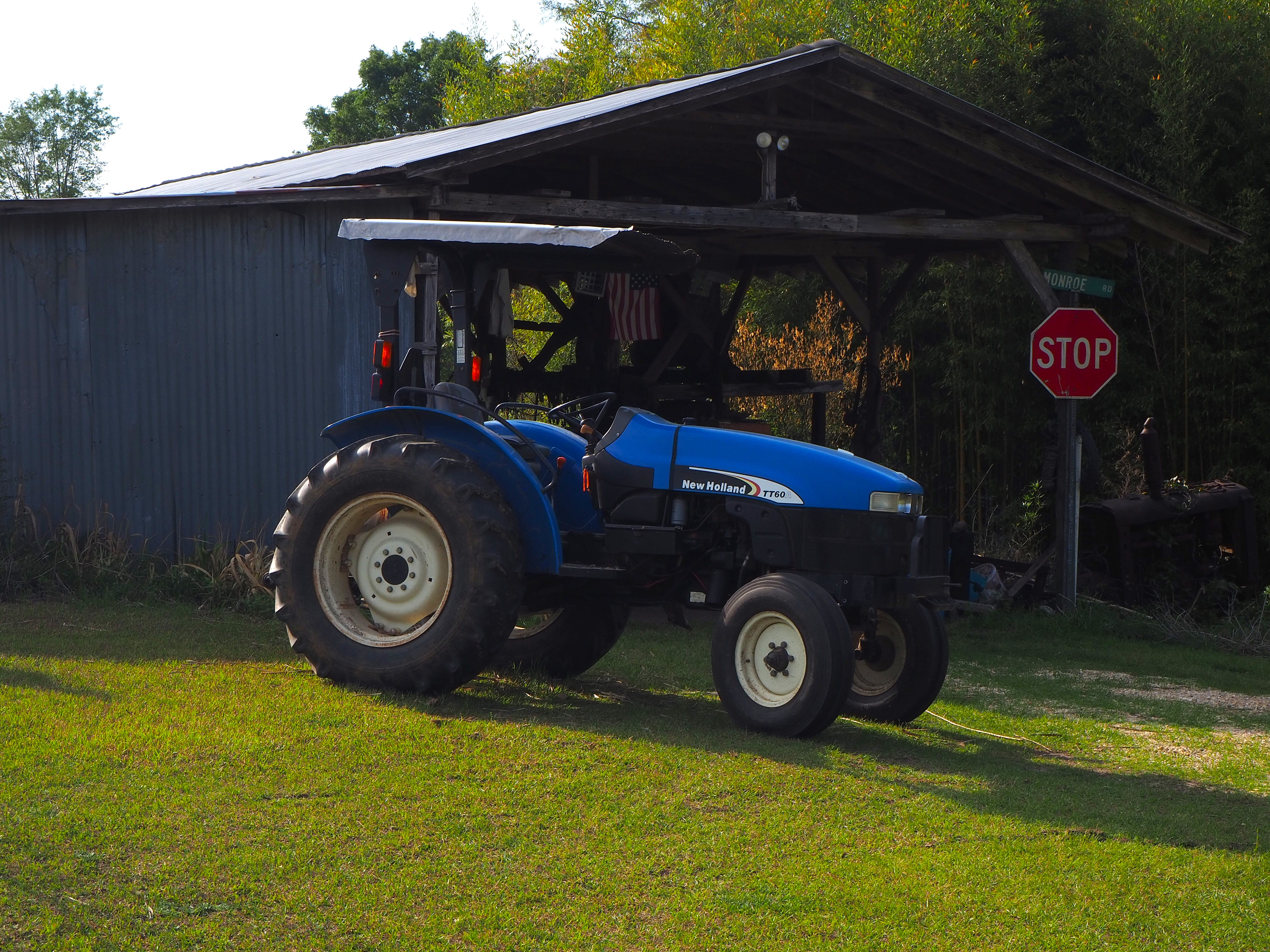
New Holland TT60A

=== Milestones ===
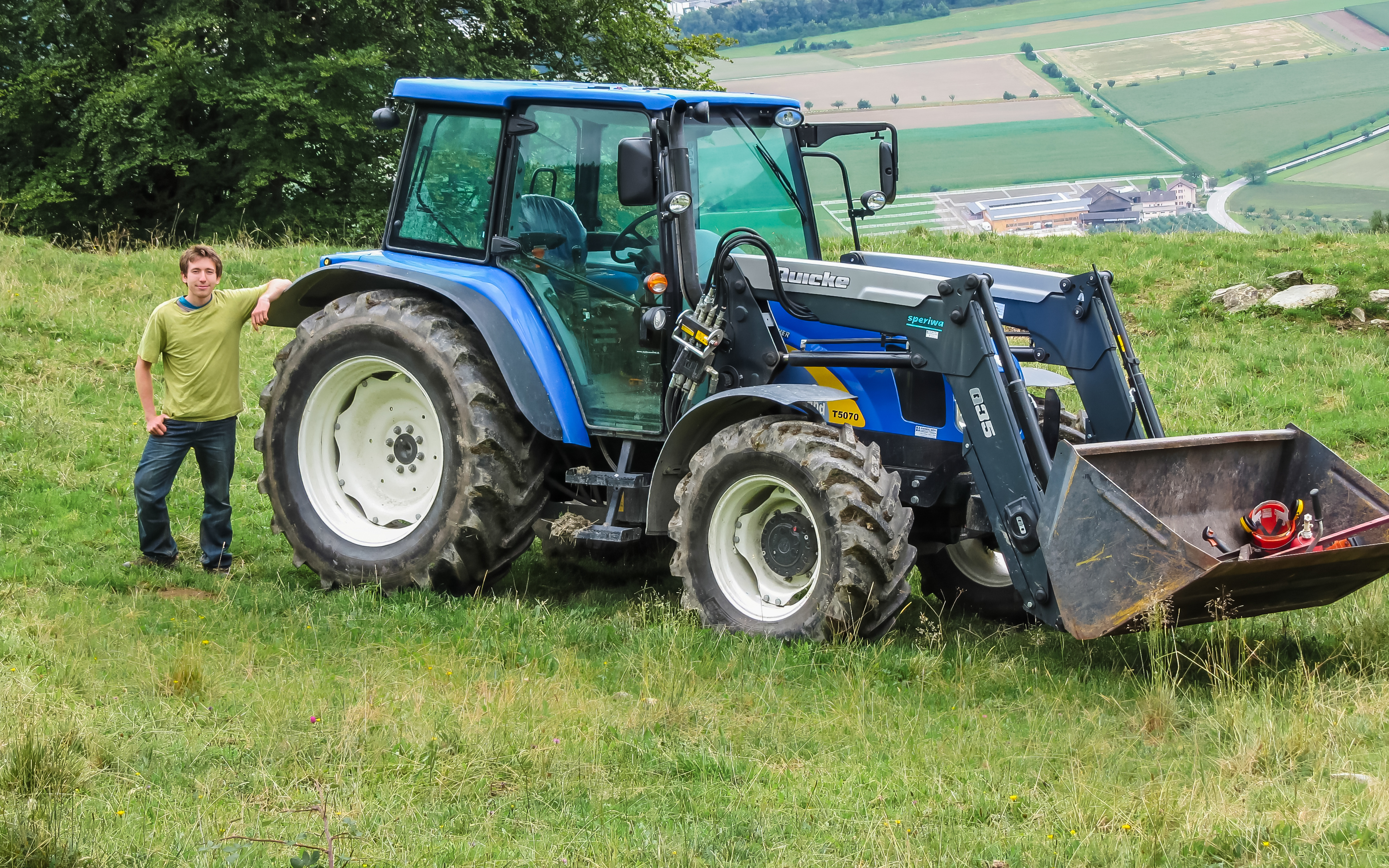
New Holland T5070 tractor with a Quicke Q35 front-loader attachment in Switzerland

Also in 2002, the New Holland TG tractor series was introduced, featuring the "Cat'sEye" lighting as dubbed by then FIAT chairman Paolo Cantarella. The free-form halogen lighting was a first, not only in tractor design, but also actually preceded the use of this type of lighting in automotive design. The TG was the first styling effort by New Holland's newly named consulting designers and stylists (Montgomery Design International), which had been the long-time firm of record for IH and CaseIH. A single sketch penned by owner and principal designer Gregg Montgomery set New Holland's styling direction, which continues today in the complete range of New Holland tractors.

From 2007 to 2010, New Holland was the sponsor of Juventus FC In Paraná State, Brazil, the first machines are delivered to the Programa Trator Solidário (Solidary Tractor). A white T7050 tractor was presented to Pope Benedictus XVI.

In 2009, New Holland Agricultural presented the world's first hydrogen-powered tractor, the FIAT NH2 at the SIMA machinery show in Paris, France. Modeled after the company's T6000 tractor, the diesel combustion engine was replaced by two electric motors.

In 2010, following the finalization of the industrial agreement between CNH and OJSC KAMAZ, the newly formed industrial joint venture had started the assembly of the New Holland new tractor models T9060, T9040, and T8050 and the CSX7080 and CSX7060 combine harvesters at its Naberezhnye Chelny plant in the Republic of Tatarstan, Russia. In 2012, two new products were added, the T8.330 tractor and the CX8080 combine..

New Holland is a Gold Sponsor of the Climate Action Networking Reception, hosted by Climate Action in partnership with the United Nations Environment Programme (UNEP) and the South African government in Durban.

In 2012, New Holland sponsored the Rio+20 Summit United Nations Conference on Sustainable Development.

In 2022, New Holland released the T7 Methane Power LNG prototype, the world's first 100% methane-fueled tractor.

== Environmental initiatives and innovation projects ==
=== NH2 hydrogen-powered tractor and energy-independent farm ===
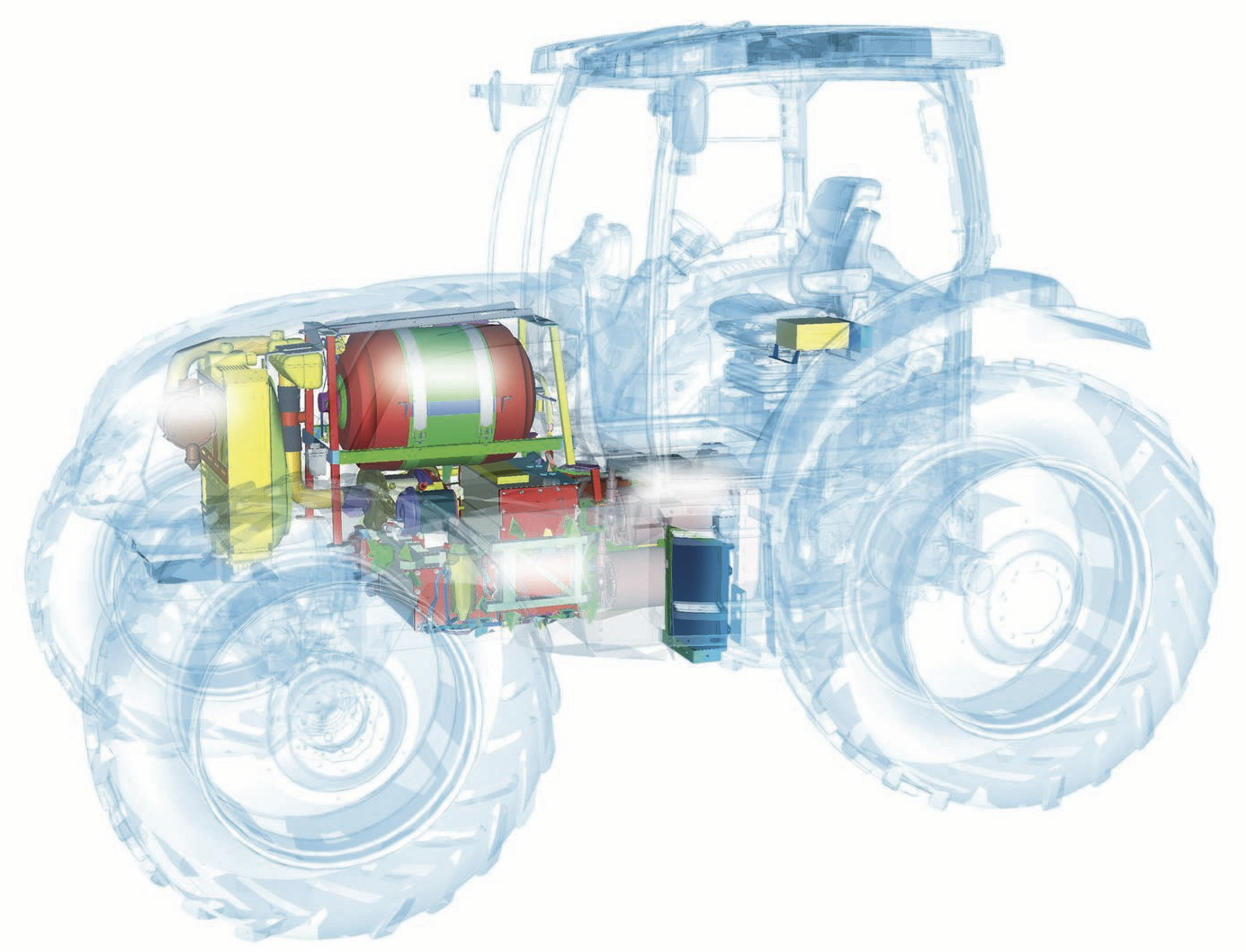
The concept of NH2 Hydrogen Tractor

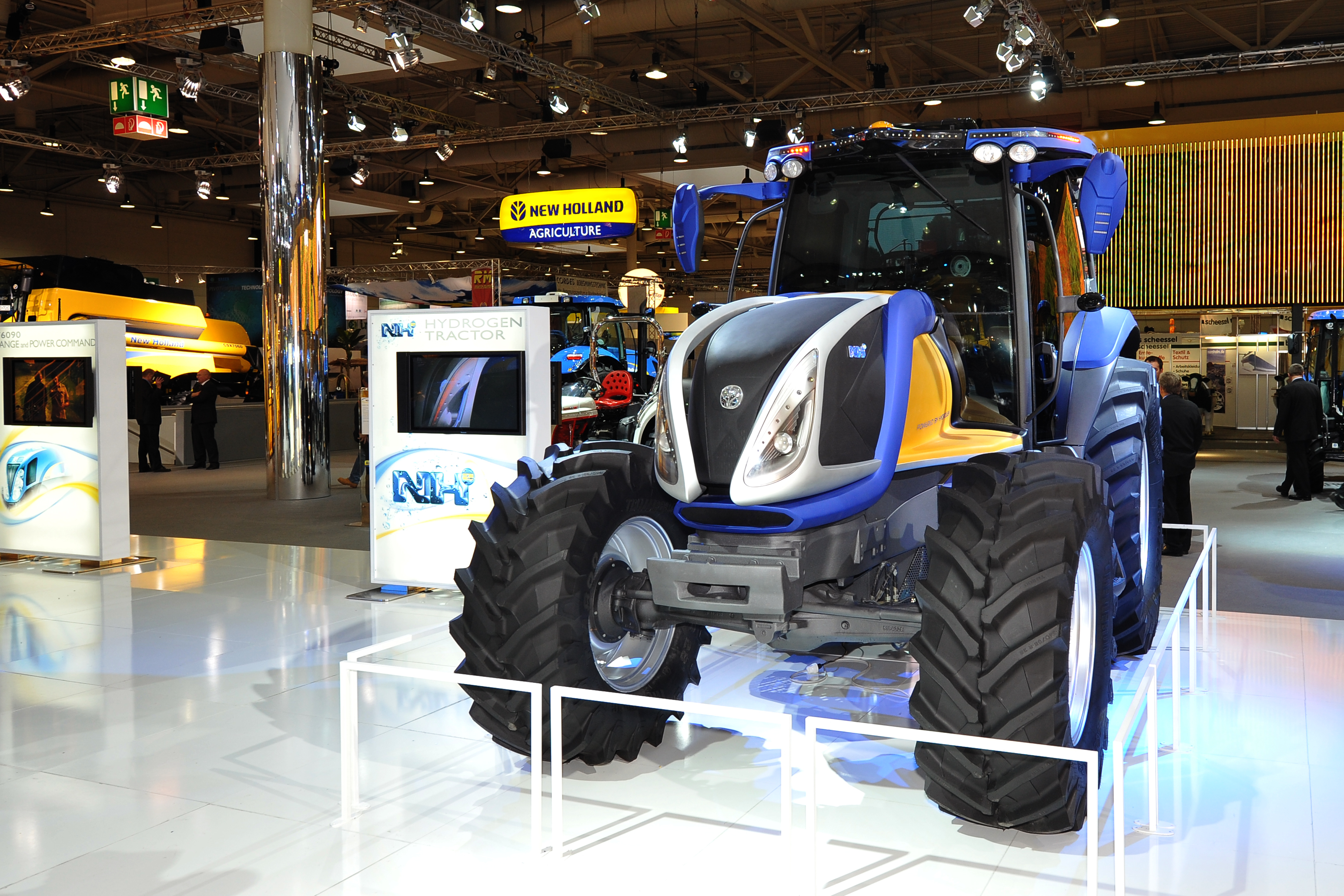
NH2 Hydrogen Tractor

New Holland has developed the Energy Independent Farm, a new approach, where farmers are meant to be able to generate their own energy to run their farm and agricultural equipment. The basis of this is the use of hydrogen generated from renewable sources, which farmers have at their disposal: wind, solar, and waste or biomass, according to its availability in each particular farming area. The electricity is then converted into hydrogen using an electrolyser; this technology is used to split water into hydrogen and oxygen gases. Basically, it needs water and electricity as inputs; the hydrogen is then stored at the farm in high-pressure tanks and is ready to be used as a free and clean fuel, which can be used directly in farm machinery or in generators to provide electrical power and heat for buildings and numerous applications. Hydrogen was chosen because it is an efficient energy carrier, it works like a battery, accumulating energy, and it is more advantageous and cleaner than a conventional battery. The hydrogen-powered NH2 tractor is based on the T6.140 production model. The tractor is able to all operate all the implements required for different seasonal operations: soil preparation, seeding, baling, transport, and front loader applications, while operating virtually silently and emitting only heat, vapour and water. Its internal combustion engine has been replaced with fuel cells that generate electricity. The compressed hydrogen stored in a special tank, and reacts with the oxygen in the air inside the cell to generate water and electricity. This powers the electric motors that drive the main transmission and the auxiliary systems of the tractor. The fuel cell generates less heat than an internal-combustion engine, offers a consistent output of power, and does not produce polluting nitrogen oxides, soot particles, or carbon dioxide. It is quicker to refuel, 5 minutes to fill a tank compared to hours required by batteries.

NH2 Hydrogen Powered Tractor was awarded a gold medal for technical innovation at SIMA in 2009.

The hydrogen powered NH2 tractor will be tested at La Bellotta, Turin, Italy, as a pilot to realize the first Energy Independent farm.

=== 100% Biodiesel equipment ===
In 2006, New Holland approved the use of Biodiesel in its products with the use of 20% Biodiesel (B20) in all of its equipment containing New Holland engines. In 2007, New Holland offered 100% Biodiesel (B100) compatibility with New Holland Tier 3 engines.. All Tier 4A ECOBlue SCR engines are compatible with 20% Biodiesel (B20) blends, as long as the biodiesel blend complies with fuel specification EN14214:2009..

=== Biomass ===
New Holland is supporting different projects based on energy production from biomass made from agricultural, industrial and domestic residue and energetic crops:

- A willow wood near Lockerbie, United Kingdom, where the forage harvester FR9090 has been tested and is actually in action to harvest crops without the further need of rework before being taken to the power station
- In Gurgaon, near Delhi, Punjab region, India, the A2Z Maintenance & Engineering is producing energy from what were previously considered to be waste products, straw from paddy fields and from cotton, maize and oilseed rape. Over 45 megawatts of electricity are delivered to the national grid. This new usage of agricultural residue also reduces the negative environmental impact of large-scale stubble burning. New Holland is currently operating a fleet of 105 tractors, 45 conventional balers, 15 rakes and 2 mowers.
- In Brazil, New Holland has started a partnership with the Centro de Tecnologia Canavieira (Sugar Cane Technology Centre – CTC) for the production of energy from sugar cane, in the traditional form of ethanol and by transforming sugar cane straw into energy. Two Brazilian test farms use a range of New Holland large square balers, tractors, wind-rowers and bale accumulators.
- In Makeni, Sierra Leone, New Holland has started a partnership with Addax Bioenergy. The first portion of the plan, the Makeni Ethanol and Power Project (MEP), entails the establishment of sugarcane estates, an ethanol refinery, a cogeneration plant and the related infrastructure. 9 New Holland medium HP tractors are operated to prepare the land for planting.

=== Methane Tractor ===
New Holland wishes to develop advanced propulsion technologies which reduce dependence on fossil fuels. The production T6 Methane Power tractor has 80% lower overall emissions than a standard tractor, and delivers the same performance too.

== Trademarks ==
New Holland introduced several patents on its products.

=== ABS SuperSteer system and Intelligent Trailer Braking system ===
ABS SuperSteer is an application of ABS technology to tractors, which offers increased safety, especially when operating on steep hills, and increased tractor manoeuvrability. ABS SuperSteer uses ABS technology to manage each wheel's brake individually. Using a single foot pedal, the ABS SuperSteer allows the tractor to be steered by the brakes. Two orange pedal extensions either side of a single pedal replace the conventional, independent two-pedal arrangement. At low speed, this provides the driver with the same single-wheel steering as a conventional tractor, but automatically disables at higher speeds to prevent accidental application. The ABS SuperSteer function includes tyre slip control and automatic coupling with the steering angle. This allows the tractor to perform tight turning maneuvers without driver intervention on brakes by pivoting on a braked rear wheel, reducing the turning circle to that of a tractor fitted with a SuperSteer front axle. A driver-selectable amount of slip on the pivoting wheel is allowed to prevent soil damage. The hill holder function improves tractor control on slopes, automatically engaging the brakes to prevent the machine rolling back during hill starts and easing clutch engagement. The Intelligent Trailer Braking system manages and equalises the braking force exerted on the trailer. When slowing with the transmission or the exhaust brake the trailer brakes are modulated so that the trailer deceleration matches that of the tractor.

The ABS system is assembled at Basildon plant using a dynamic standard operating procedure, this enables any operator to assemble the highly complex assembly made up of around 80 processes and 25 different assembly tools, and this also incorporates a test station to ensure the ABS unit is in perfect working order before fitting to a tractor. This system uses new technologies and 3D Assembly instructions. The project leader is process engineer Howard Turnnidge.

=== Opti-Fan system ===
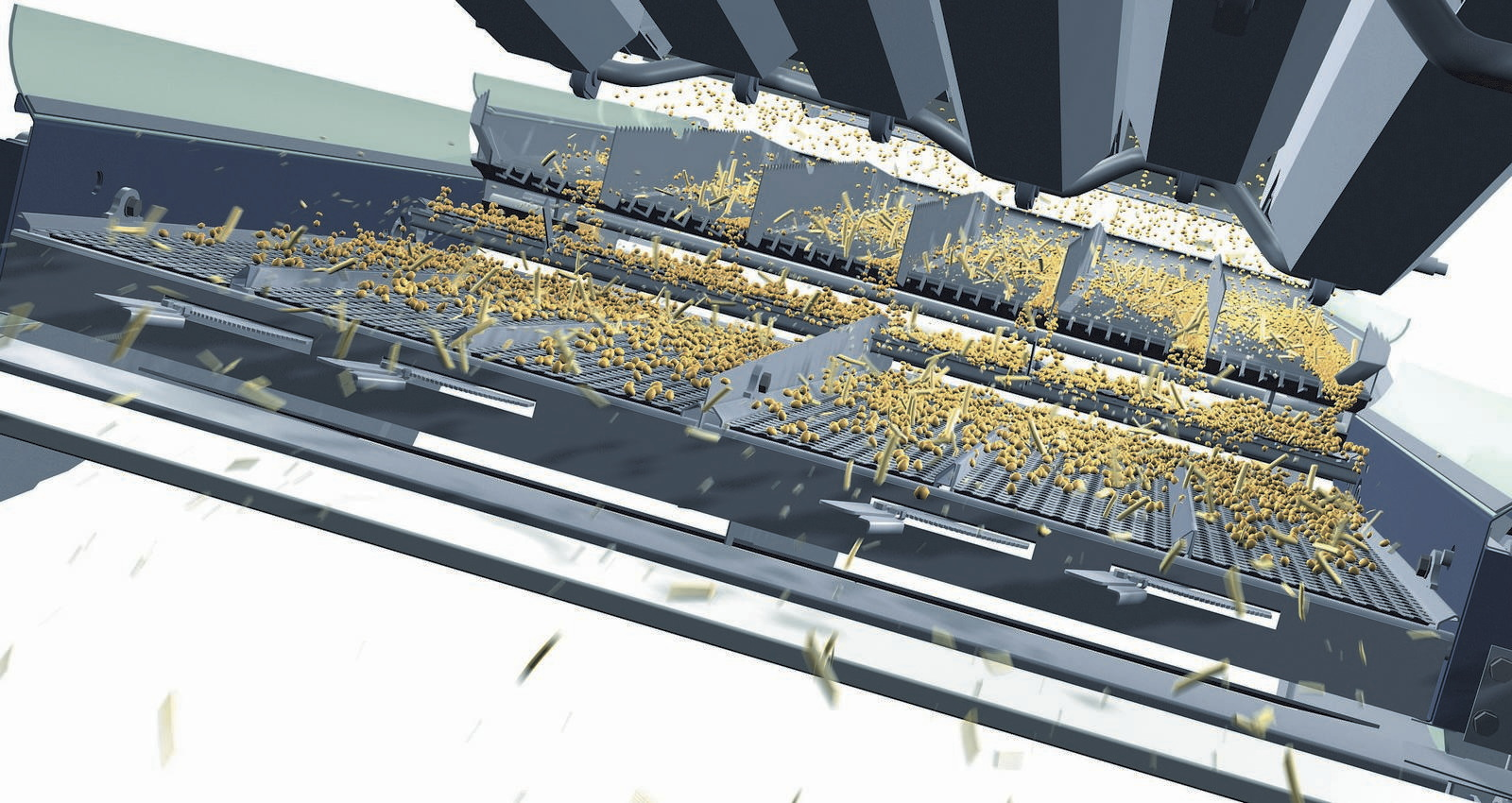
The Opti-Fan system.

The Opti-Fan system compensates automatically for continuous uphill or downhill gradients in combines. When driving downhill, material moves against gravity and therefore more slowly over the grainpan and top sieve, causing it to remain longer in the cleaning shoe and the layer thickness to increase. More ‘material other than grain' (MOG) remains in the cleaning shoe as the set cleaning fan speed is insufficient to clear the crop. Driving uphill causes the material layer to decrease as it moves more quickly out of the shoe under gravity. The air flow from the fan is too high for the thin layer of material which results in the material travelling too quickly over the top causing increased grain losses. The fan speed control system senses the combine's angle of ascent or descent and automatically adjusts the cleaning fan speed to compensate. The operator sets the level-field fan speed and the system reduces the speed when travelling uphill and increases it downhill to optimise the material layer thickness on the cleaning shoe. The Opti-Fan system was awarded with a silver medal at Agritechnica in 2009.

=== IntelliFill system ===
The FR9000's IntelliFill system allows the operator to fill a trailer accurately and with minimal losses, even when visibility is limited. Following a front-to-rear or rear-to-front pattern, the automatic trailer tracking system uses a specialised 3D camera mounted under the spout to guide the crop flow into the trailer. The system ensures a uniform fill whether the trailer is alongside the forage harvester, or following, in the case of starting new fields. The system can accurately control the crop flow trajectory even when operating at night. The spout-mounted sensor creates a distance image of the trailer and its surroundings, based on NIR (near infrared) technology. Unlike conventional mono or stereo camera systems, which have poor depth perception, the New Holland tracking system can accurately position the crop flow to a distance of 20 metres. IntelliFill system was awarded with a gold medal at Agritechnica in 2009..

=== Super Steer system ===
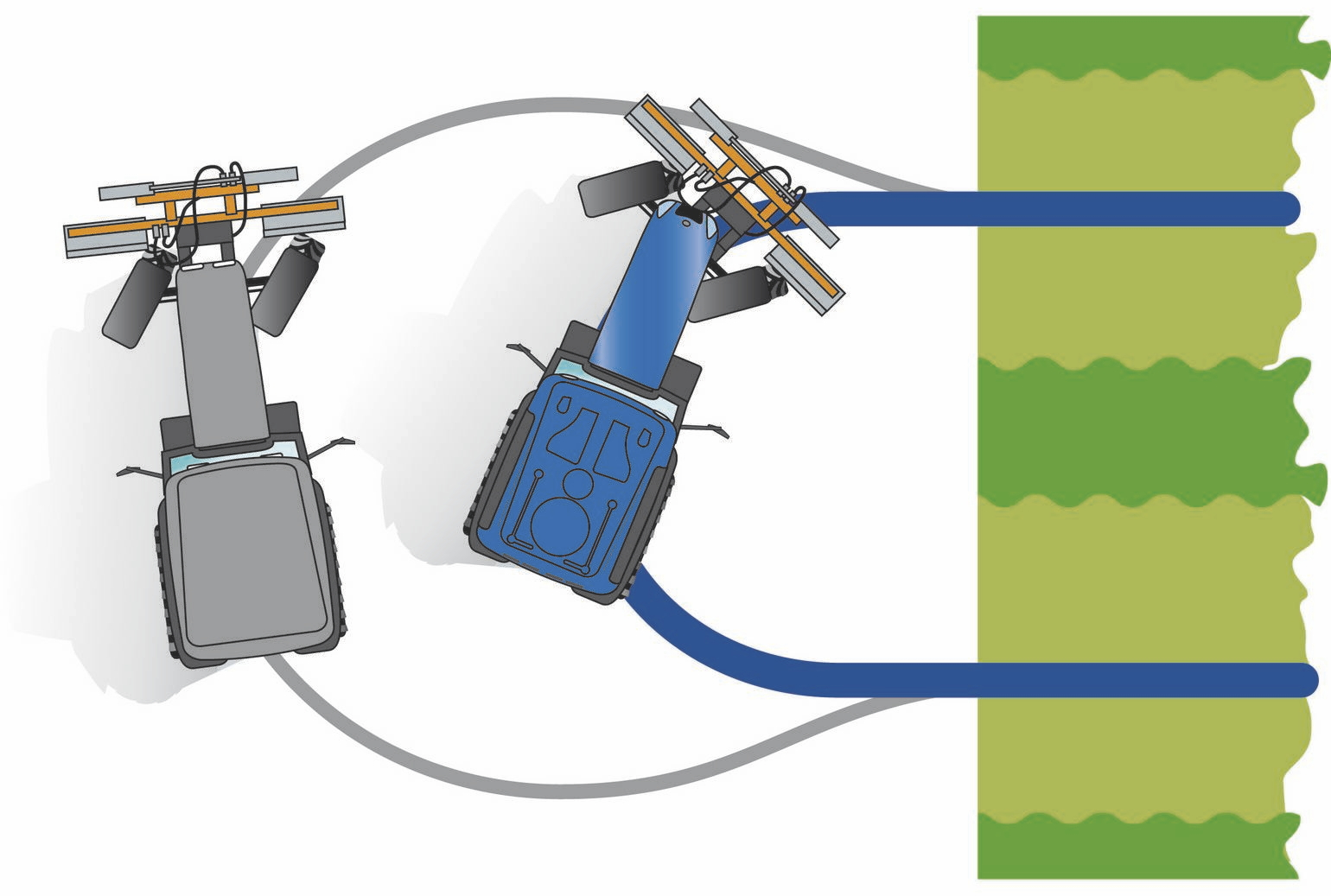
The Super Steer

The SuperSteer front axle reduces the turn radius of the tractor. The front axle beam turns with the wheels to give an effective turn angle of 65°. The tractor turns tighter and faster so it spends less time turning and more time working. The SuperSteer front axle also increases the wheelbase, with the weight of the front ballast resting directly on the front axle beam. Traction is enhanced in certain conditions without need for extra ballast.

=== Moisture system ===
Two star wheels penetrate the bale and provide an accurate measurement of the moisture content; the information about the condition of the crop being baled prevents processing a crop which is not really ready and allows precise application of additives.

=== Sensitrak 4WD management ===
The optional Sensitrak traction management allows the tractor to automatically switch in and out of 4-wheel drive.

=== On the move bale weighting system ===
The weight data is transmitted instantaneously to the monitor in the tractor cab, enabling the operator to keep a constant and accurate check on the progress of baling operations and optimizes the performance of the baler to suit harvesting conditions. This automatic system bale weighing system has an accuracy of +/- 2% and can easily handle different bale size in any kind of crop condition. It is available as a dealer installed accessory.

=== Edgewrap system ===
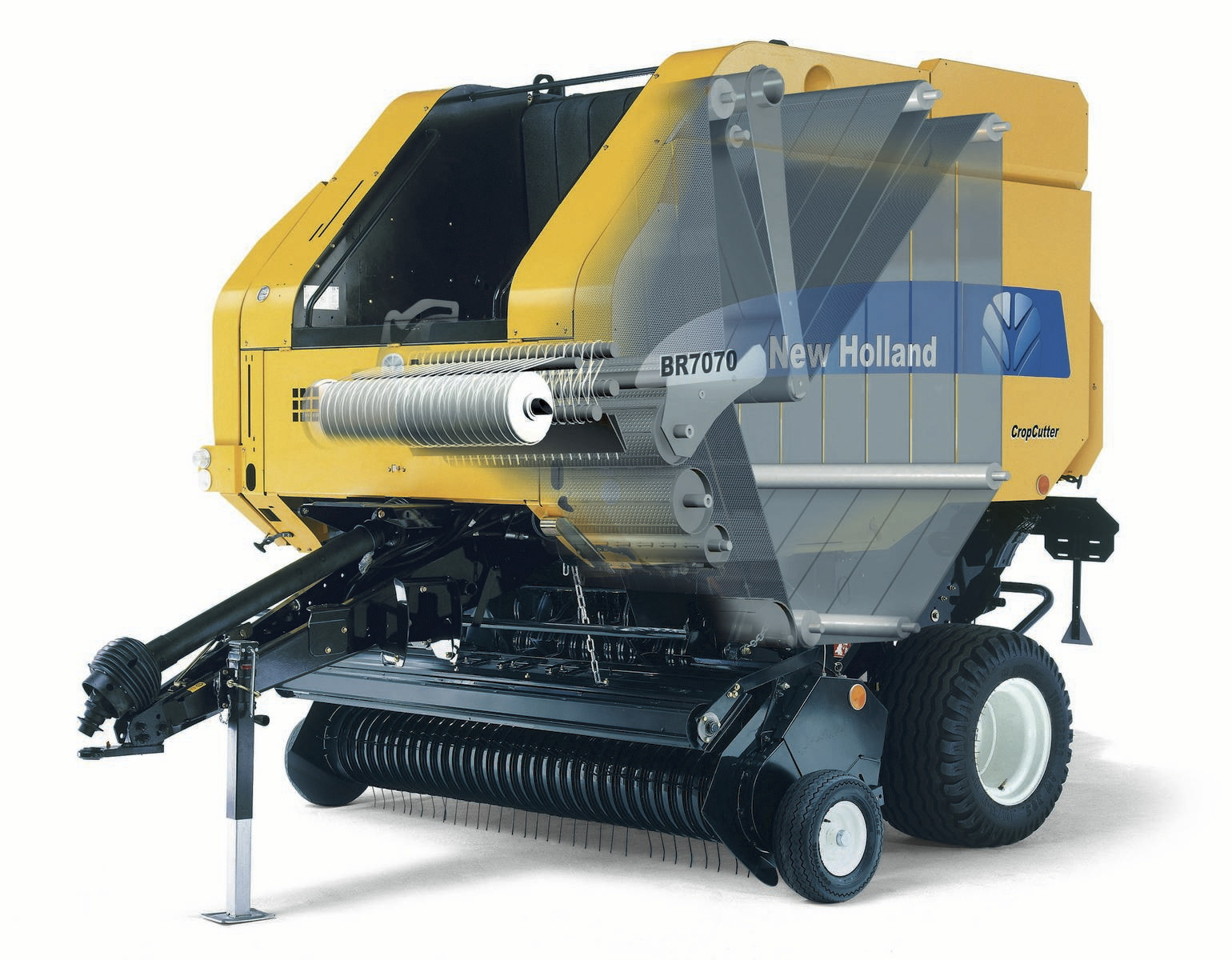
The Edgewrap system

With the New Holland EdgeWrap system, the net wrap is brought to the bale by a duckbill net applicator. The system penetrates in the bale chamber for positive wrapping material delivery. The duckbill net applicator is wider than the bale chamber, providing coverage of the bale edge. The use of wide net provides over the edge coverage.

=== Grain Cam system ===
A camera recognises the concentration of chaff and broken grain in the sample as it is transferred through the grain elevator to the grain tank; this information is shown on the IntelliView III monitor in the form of a graph, allowing the operator to fine tune adjustments, further boosting grain purity. Grain Cam was awarded by the gold medal for innovation at Agritechnica in 2007.

=== Opti-Clean cleaning shoe ===
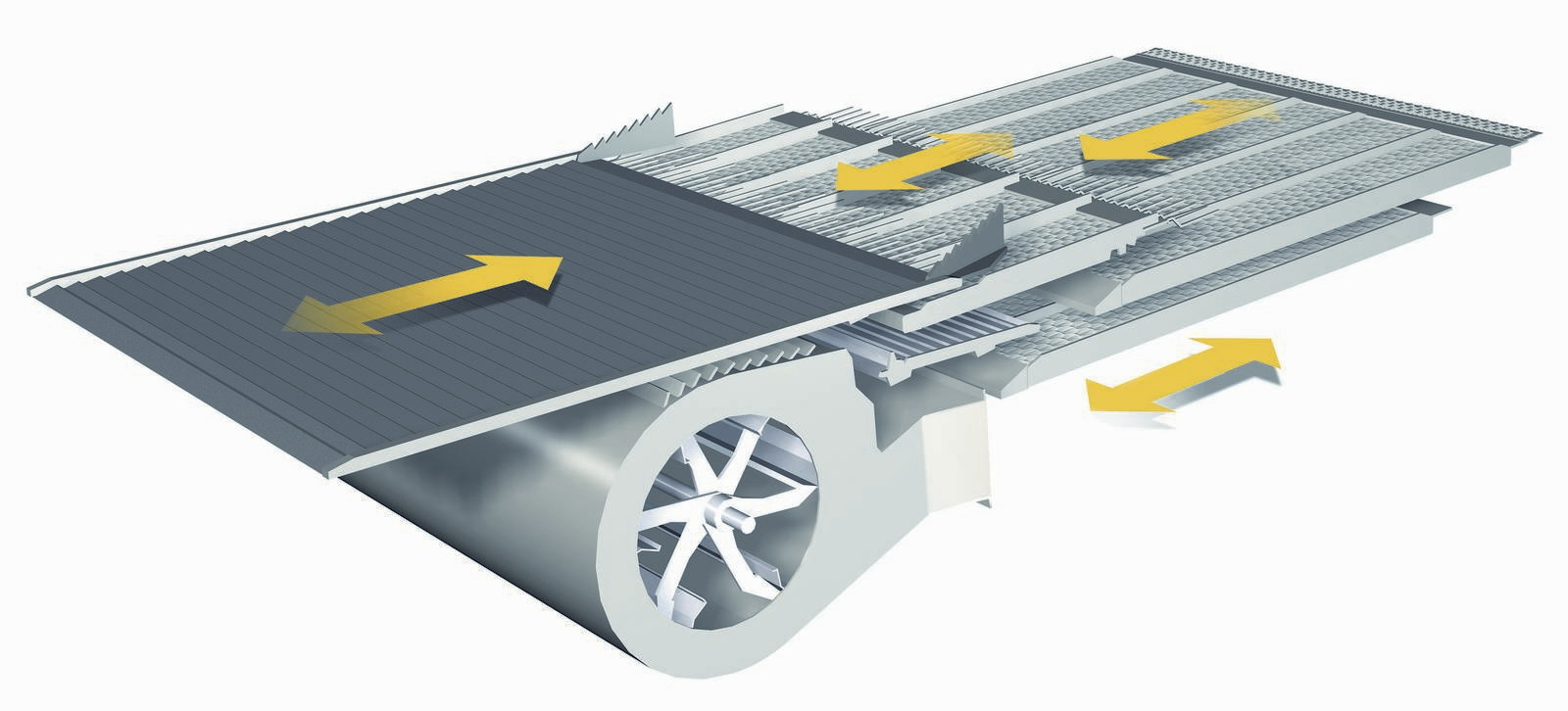
The Opti-Clean cleaning shoe

The Opti-Clean system optimizes the strike and the throwing angles of each of the main components in CR9000 Elevation models. The grain pan is not coupled with the pre-sieve and top sieve so that each element can operate as its optimum efficiency. The cascade distance between the grain pan and the pre-sieve is increased for greater capacity, while a long sieve stroke and a steep throwing angle keep more material airborne, for even a higher cleaning efficiency. The opposing motion of the grain pan and bottom sieve to the pre-sieve reduces overall machine vibrations and increases operator comfort.

=== Sidewinder ===
The SideWinder II armrest is a new command control for T6, T7, T8 and T9 tractor ranges. The most frequently used controls have been placed in this armrest to improve ergonomics and productivity.

=== Synchroknife ===
The SynchroKnife drive technology includes a single, centrally mounted gearbox with double knife drive which ensures lateral weight distribution for more uniform stubble height, as well as significantly reducing knife stress and vibration. Located under the header floor, the edge of the uncut crop is protected from potential snagging caused by bulky side-mounted knife drive gearboxes.

== Awards and recognition ==
In 2014, New Holland released its first ever Class 10 combine, the CR10.90. With 653 hp, it is the largest and most powerful combine on the market. On August 15, 2014, a CR10.90 set a new world record for combine harvesting, recognized by Guinness World Records, with 797.7 tonnes of wheat harvested in eight hours.

On April 5, 2017, a CR8.90 set a new world record for soybean combine harvesting, recognized by the Guinness World Records, with 439.73 tonnes of soybeans harvested in eight hours.

New Holland products have received numerous awards and recognitions for innovation in industry. Some of the most recent instances include:

Year	Product	Award	Jury Panel	Event	Country
2011	CX Opti-Fan System	AE50 Award for Engineering Innovation	ASABE (American Society of Agricultural and Biological Engineers)		USA
2011	BB9000 - CropID system	Silver medal for technical innovation	Organizers' jury panel	SIMA	France
2011	T7 Range - Intelligent Trailer Braking System	Silver medal for innovation	DLG - German Agricultural Society	Agritechnica	Germany
2011	Smart Key	Silver medal for innovation	DLG - German Agricultural Society	Agritechnica	Germany
2011	CR - SynchroKnife drive	Silver medal for innovation	DLG - German Agricultural Society	Agritechnica	Germany
2011	ECOBraud - Sustainable Viticulture	Silver medal for innovation	DLG - German Agricultural Society	Agritechnica	Germany
2011	Braud9090X Olive - SuperIntensive Olive Farming	Silver medal for innovation	DLG - German Agricultural Society	Agritechnica	Germany
2011	CR Combine	Maschine des Jahres 2012	DLV - German press association	Agritechnica	Germany
2012	T8 Tractor	AE50 Award for Engineering Innovation	ASABE (American Society of Agricultural and Biological Engineers)		USA
2012	T9.560 4WD Tractor	AE50 Award for Engineering Innovation	ASABE (American Society of Agricultural and Biological Engineers)		USA
2012	CR - SynchroKnife drive	AE50 Award for Engineering Innovation	ASABE (American Society of Agricultural and Biological Engineers)		USA
2012	MowMax II Cutterbar for Durabine Disc Mower-Conditioner header	AE50 Award for Engineering Innovation	ASABE (American Society of Agricultural and Biological Engineers)		USA
2012	Cornrower - Corn Stover Windrowing attachment to a corn header	AE50 Award for Engineering Innovation	ASABE (American Society of Agricultural and Biological Engineers)		USA
2018	IntelliSense on CR Revelation	AE50 Award for Engineering Innovation	ASABE (American Society of Agricultural and Biological Engineers)		USA
2018	T6 Dynamic Command	AE50 Award for Engineering Innovation	ASABE (American Society of Agricultural and Biological Engineers)		USA
2018	CustomSteer^{™} for T6 and T7	AE50 Award for Engineering Innovation	ASABE (American Society of Agricultural and Biological Engineers)		USA
2018	IntelliTurn^{™} for T6, T7, T8 and T9	AE50 Award for Engineering Innovation	ASABE (American Society of Agricultural and Biological Engineers)		USA
2018	Opti-Spread Plus^{™} on CR	AE50 Award for Engineering Innovation	ASABE (American Society of Agricultural and Biological Engineers)		USA
2018	Intelligent Trailer Braking System for T6 and T7 Auto Command	AE50 Award for Engineering Innovation	ASABE (American Society of Agricultural and Biological Engineers)		USA
2022	OptiSpread Automation System	Silver medal for innovation	DLG - German Agricultural Society	Agritechnica	Germany
2022	Big Baler Automation	Silver medal for innovation	DLG - German Agricultural Society	Agritechnica	Germany
2023	T4 Electric Utility Tractor	Silver medal for innovation	DLG - German Agricultural Society	Agritechnica	Germany
2023	T7.270 Methane Power (LNG)	Silver medal for innovation	DLG - German Agricultural Society	Agritechnica	Germany
2023	CR11 Combine	Gold medal for innovation	DLG - German Agricultural Society	Agritechnica	Germany

Awarded New Holland Products
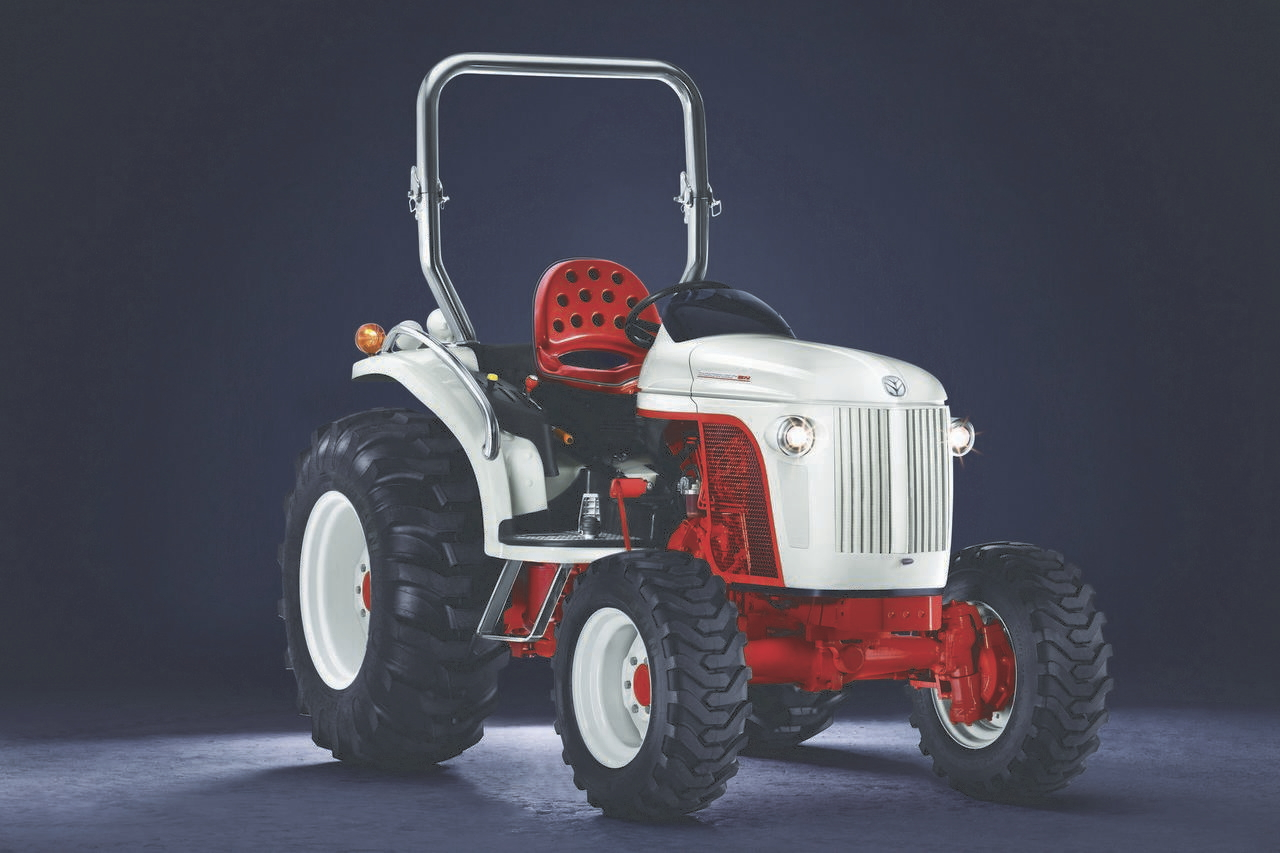
Boomer 8N was awarded with AE50 Award for Engineering Innovation and Good Design Award by Chicago Atheneum.

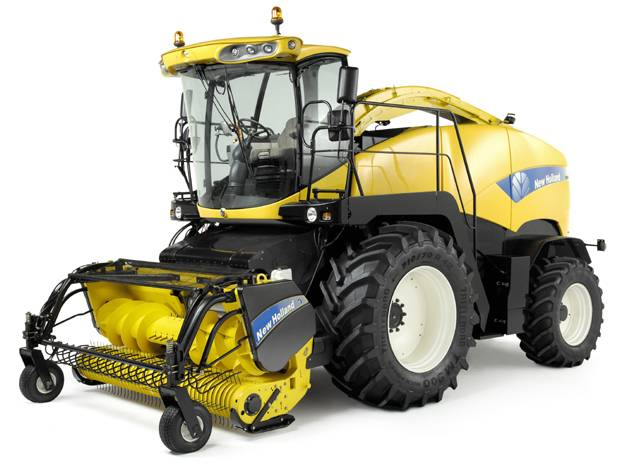
FR9000 won a Gold Medal for Technical Innovation at Agritechnica for the Intellifill system.

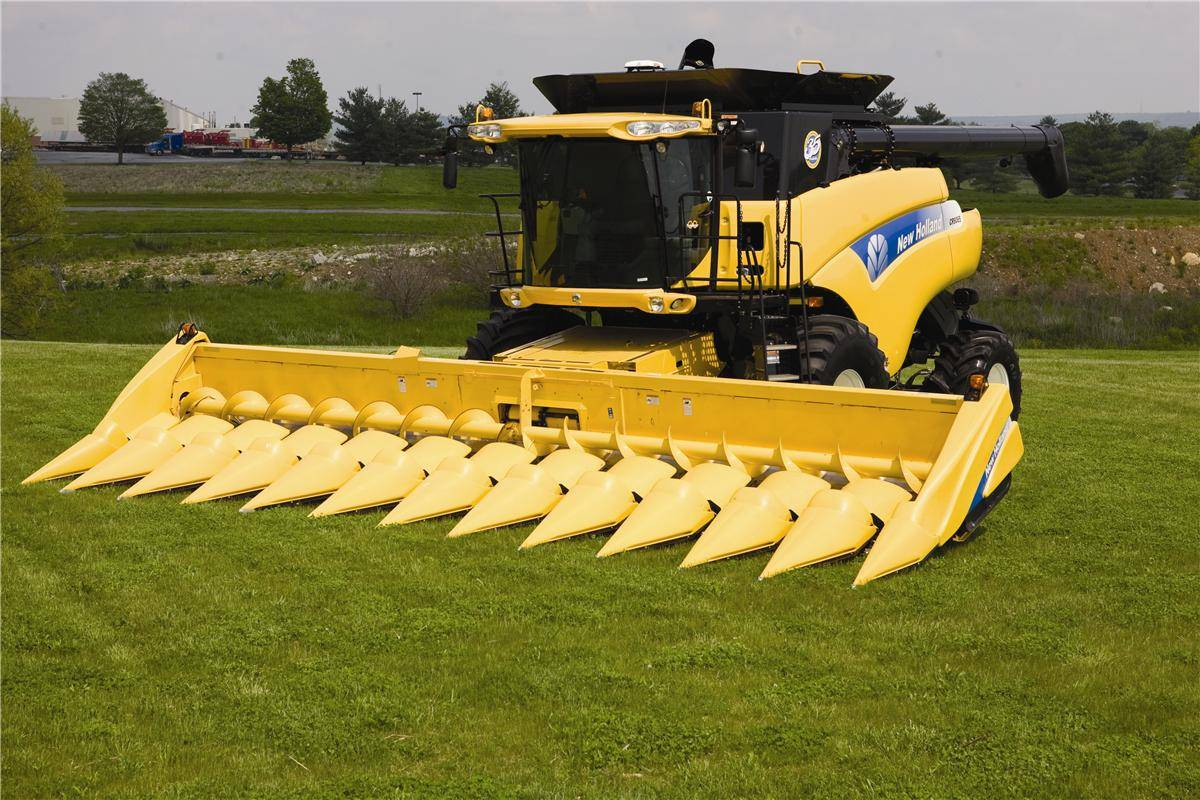
CR9000 was awarded by AE50 Award for Engineering Innovation for the IntelliView monitor

== See also ==
- New Holland Construction
