= Distelhäuser Brewery =

Brewery in Baden-Württemberg, Germany

Coordinates: 49°35′56″N 9°41′36″E

Distelhäuser Brauerei
- Native name: Distelhäuser Brauerei
- Company type: Limited partnership business entity (GmbH & Co. KG)
- Founded: 1811
- Headquarters: Distelhausen, Germany
- Key people: Roland Andre, Achim Kalweit
- Products: beer and shandy drinks
- Revenue: ca. 20 Million EUR (2010)
- Number of employees: 147 (2015)
- Website: www.distelhaeuser.com

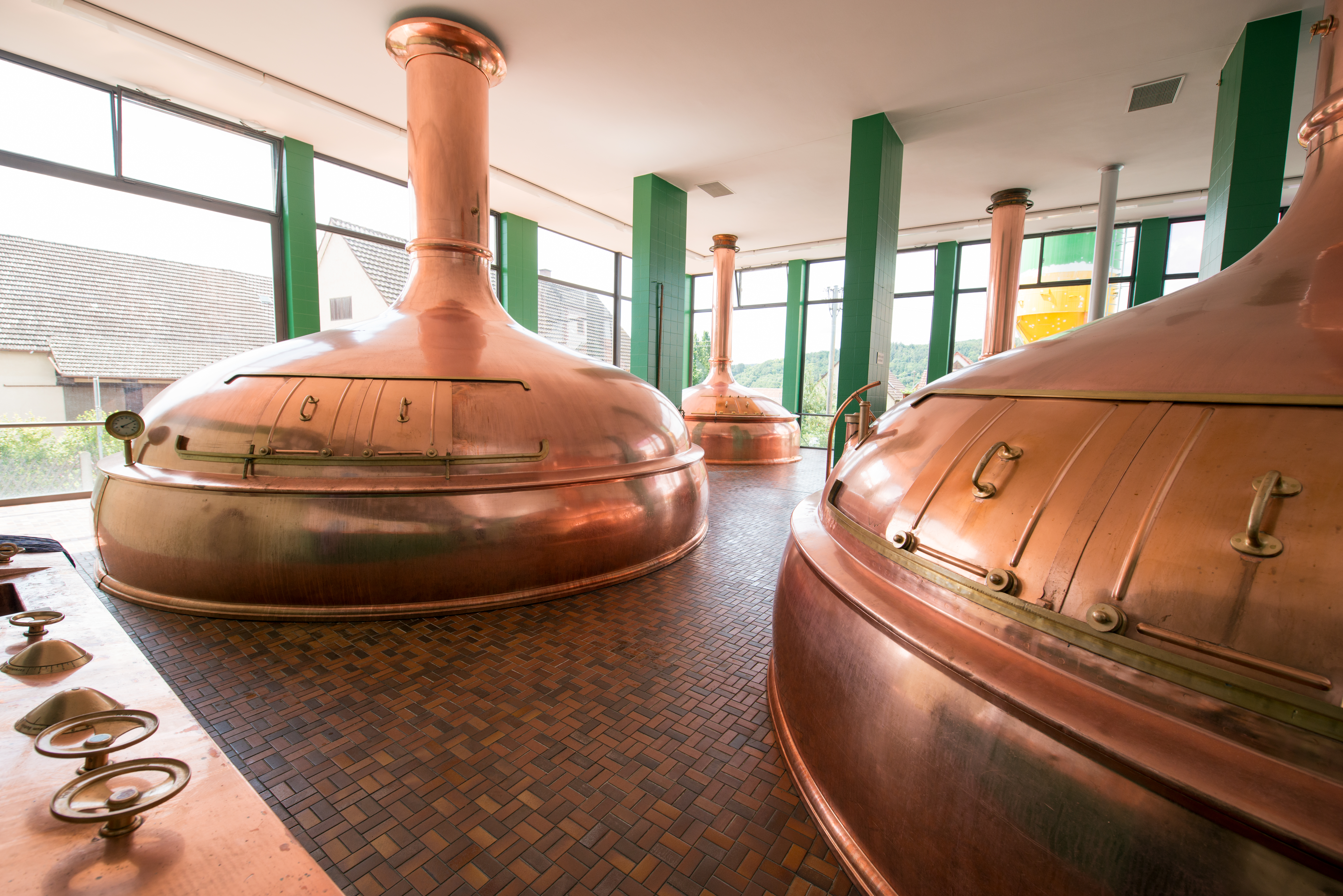
A look at the brewhouse of the Distelhäuser brewery (2016)

The Distelhäuser Brewery (German: Distelhäuser Brauerei) is a medium-sized brewery in Distelhausen, a district of Tauberbischofsheim in the Tauber valley, in Tauber Franconia, Germany.

== History ==
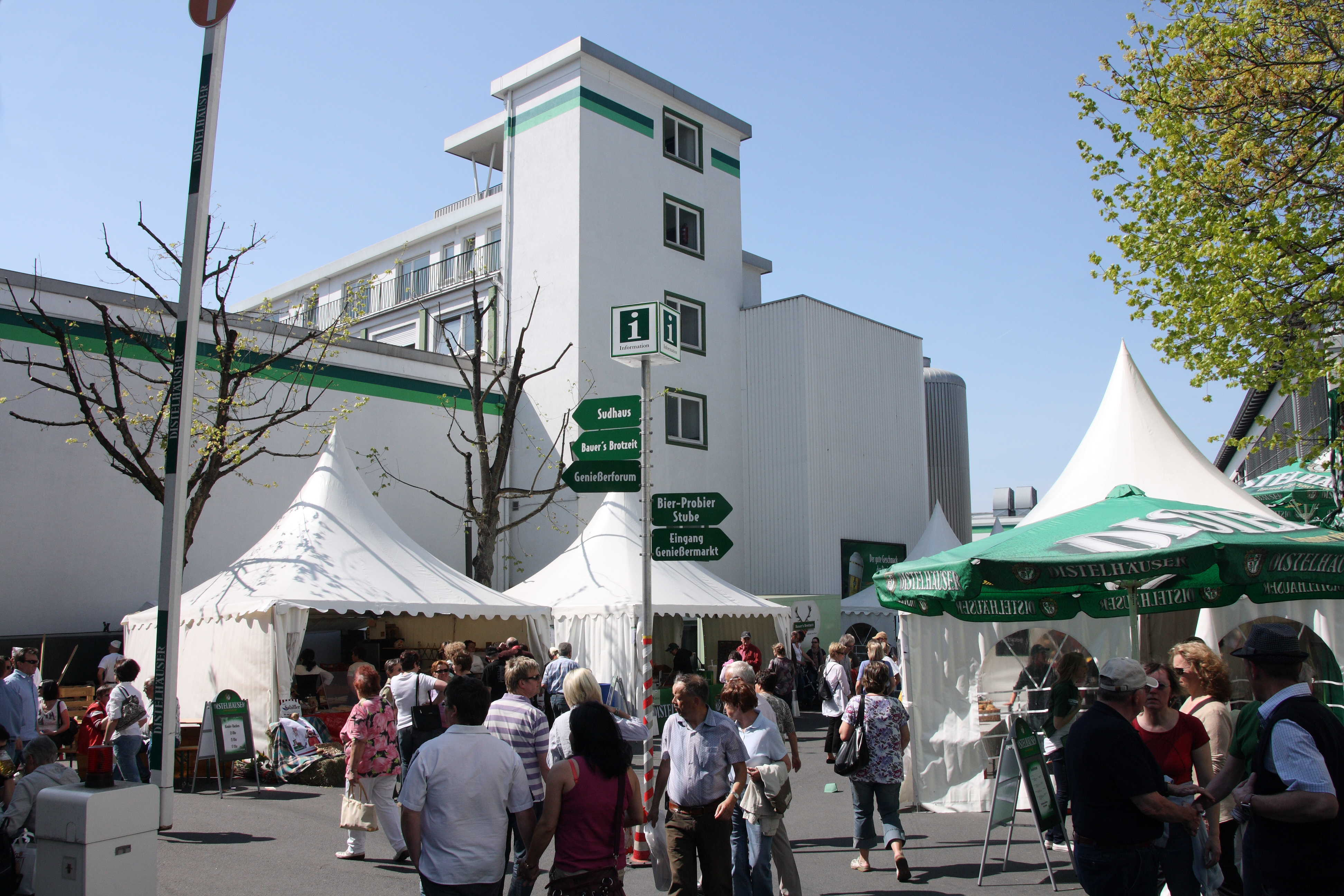
Distelhäuser gourmet market (2010)

The brewery was founded in 1811 as Brewery Womann and acquired in 1876 by Ernst Bauer. The annual production is about 185,000 hectolitres (as at: May 2015). The raw materials used are traditionally mainly from the region of Tauber Franconia. Distelhäuser Beer is brewed in accordance with the German purity law (Reinheitsgebot) of 1516, and the brewery is a founding member of the Die Freien Brauer (Independent Brewers) initiative, an association of medium-sized private breweries in Germany and Austria. As early as 1956 the brewery involved its staff in various forms in the profits.

On the brewery grounds in Distelhausen is the restaurant of Distelhäuser Brauhaus, the butcher's shop Farmer's snack (Bauers Brotzeit) and the convention centre Old bottling hall (Alte Füllerei).

Since 2001 the Distelhäuser Brewery has operated in a service centre in Erlenbach in the district of Heilbronn in Baden-Württemberg in southern Germany to improve its logistics.

The Distelhäuser brewery is a sponsor of Slow Food Germany. Between the years 2004 and 2012 in the grounds of the brewery in cooperation with Slow Food the Distelhäuser gourmet market (Distelhäuser Genießermarkt) took place.

== Honours ==
The Distelhäuser Brewery is one of the most successful breweries in Germany measured by the number of awards for its products. The following awards have been earned by the brewery and the products (point of time: May 2015):

=== Brewery awards ===
- In 2009, the Distelhäuser Brewery won the "Brewery of the Year" prize awarded by the German Agricultural Society (DLG).
- In 2014, the Distelhäuser Brewery won the DLG "Brewery of the Year" prize again.

=== Beer awards ===
Distelhäuser Pils (German-Style Pilsener)

- World Beer Cup: 2002 Gold
- European Beer Star: 2006 Silver, 2008 Silver
- Internat. DLG-Qualitätswettbewerb: 2006 Silver, 2007 Gold, 2009 Gold, 2010 Gold, 2011 Gold, 2012 Gold, 2013 Silver, 2014 Gold, 2015 Gold

Alkoholfreies (Alcohol-free German-Style Pilsener).

- Internat. DLG-Qualitätswettbewerb: 2014 Gold, 2015 Silver

Leichtes (German-Style Leichtbier/Lightweightbeer)

- World Beer Cup: 2010 Silver
- European Beer Star: 2006 Gold
- Internationaler DLG-Qualitätswettbewerb: 2007 Bronze, 2008 Silver, 2012 Bronze, 2013 Silver

Hefe-Weizen (South German-Style Hefeweizen/Hefeweissbier/Naturally cloudy yeast wheat)

- Internationaler DLG-Qualitätswettbewerb: 2006 Gold, 2007 Gold, 2008 Gold, 2009 Gold, 2010 Gold, 2011 Gold, 2012 Gold, 2013 Gold, 2014 Gold, 2015 Gold

Hefe-Weizen alkoholfrei (Alcohol-free South German-Style Hefeweizen/Hefeweissbier/Isotonic yeast wheat)

- Internationaler DLG-Qualitätswettbewerb: 2011 Gold, 2013 Silver, 2014 Gold, 2015 Gold

Kristall-Weizen (Clear crystal wheat)

- World Beer Cup: 2008 Gold, 2010 Bronze
- European Beer Star: 2008 Gold, 2009 Silver
- Internationaler DLG-Qualitätswettbewerb: 2009 Gold, 2010 Silver, 2011 Gold, 2012 Silver, 2013 Silver

Dunkles Hefe-Weizen (South German-Style Dunkel Weizen/Dunkel Weissbier/Spicy dark yeast wheat)

- World Beer Cup: 2002 Silver, 2004 Silver, 2006 Gold, 2010 Bronze
- European Beer Star: 2005 Gold, 2006 Silver
- Internationaler DLG-Qualitätswettbewerb: 2006 Gold, 2007 Gold, 2008 Gold, 2009 Gold, 2010 Gold, 2011 Gold, 2012 Gold, 2013 Gold, 2014 Gold, 2015 Gold

Dinkel

- European Beer Star: 2007 Silver, 2008 Silver, 2009 Silver, 2011 Gold, 2012 Bronze, 2014 Gold
- Internationaler DLG-Qualitätswettbewerb: 2009 Gold, 2010 Gold, 2011 Gold, 2012 Gold, 2013 Gold, 2014 Gold, 2015 Gold

Kellerbier (Cellar Beer)

- Internat. DLG-Qualitätswettbewerb: 2014 Gold, 2015 Gold

Landbier (European-Style Dark)

- World Beer Cup: 2006 Silver
- European Beer Star: 2013 Bronze
- Internationaler DLG-Qualitätswettbewerb: 2006 Gold, 2007 Gold, 2008 Gold, 2009 Gold, 2010 Gold, 2011 Gold, 2012 Silver, 2013 Silver, 2014 Gold, 2015 Gold

Märzen (German-Style Märzen)

- Internationaler DLG-Qualitätswettbewerb: 2006 Gold, 2007 Gold, 2008 Silver, 2009 Gold, 2010 Silver, 2011 Gold, 2012 Gold, 2013 Gold, 2014 Gold, 2015 Silver

Export (European-Style Export)

- World Beer Cup: 2004 Bronze
- European Beer Star: 2004 Silver
- Internationaler DLG-Qualitätswettbewerb: 2006 Gold, 2007 Gold, 2008 Silver, 2009 Gold, 2010 Gold, 2011 Gold, 2012 Silver, 2013 Gold, 2014 Gold, 2015 Gold

Malz (Non-Alcoholic Malt Tonic)

- World Beer Cup: 2006 Gold
- Internationaler DLG-Qualitätswettbewerb: 2006 Gold, 2007 Gold, 2008 Gold, 2009 Gold, 2010 Gold, 2011 Gold, 2012 Gold, 2013 Gold, 2014 Gold, 2015 Gold

Frühlingsbock (German-Style Heller Bock/Maibock/Bright Spring-Bock)

- World Beer Cup: 2010 Gold

Distel Spezial

- Internationaler DLG-Qualitätswettbewerb: 2012 Gold, 2013 Gold, 2015 Gold

Distel Blond

- European Beer Star: 2013 Silver
- Internat. DLG-Qualitätswettbewerb: 2014 Gold, 2015 Gold

Black Pearl Classic Porter

- Meiningers international CraftBeer Award: 2014 Silver, 2015 Gold

Loch Ness Classic Stout

- Meiningers international CraftBeer Award: 2014 Gold, 2015 Silver

Lucky Hop IPA

- Silver Meiningers international CraftBeer Award 2014
