= Big Dutchman =

Agriculture company

Big Dutchman AG
- Type: AG
- Industry: Poultry farming, Pig farming
- Founded: 1938
- Founder: Jack DeWitt, Dick DeWitt
- Headquarters: Vechta-Calveslage, Germany
- Key people: Jürgen B. Steinemann (Chairman of the Supervisory Board); Steffen Bersch (Chief Executive Officer)
- Products: Housing equipment and feeding systems for modern poultry and pig farming
- Revenue: €1.552 billion (2025)
- Number of employees: 3,460 (2025)
- Website: www.bigdutchman.de

Big Dutchman AG is a distributor of housing equipment and feeding systems for poultry and pig farming based in Vechta-Calveslage, Germany. The independent family business is active in more than 100 countries.

== History ==
Jack DeWitt and his brother Dick founded the parent company of Big Dutchman in Holland, Michigan, in 1938, with the intention of making the laborious hand feeding on poultry farms more efficient through utilizing an automatic feed transport chain. While initially, the company was a hatchery and later specialized in raising and processing turkeys, the brothers subsequently developed it into a manufacturer of feeding systems. During the late 1940s, the DeWitt brothers developed a flat chain with only two links to deliver feed to the birds. The Automatic Poultry Feeder Company, which was later renamed DeWitt Industries Poultry Feeder Company by the DeWitts, was founded by the brothers to promote their automatic feeder. In the 1950s, the company expanded into Europe and relied on sales agencies. In 1955, the DeWitts launched a new breed, a chicken about twice the size of a traditional broiler.

In 1958, a 26-year-old poultry farmer named Josef Meerpohl joined the company as a sales representative in Germany. In 1964, the company was renamed Big Dutchman by the DeWitt brothers. In 1968, they sold their Big Dutchman shares, and by 1971, they had withdrawn from the industry completely.

In 1985, the whole company was acquired by Meerpohl through a management buyout. Additionally, in the 1980s, the company headquarters were moved to Vechta in Germany. In 1992, Bernd Meerpohl took over the management from his father.

In January 2014, Big Dutchman acquired the Spanish poultry equipment supplier Zucami. In November 2016, German professional journal Agrarheute reported that the German Agricultural Society awarded Big Dutchman the EuroTier innovation award for the hygiene valve for their Culina Flex piglet feeding system.

In February 2022, Big Dutchman announced a minority stake in the Dutch Ammerlaan Group from Venlo.

== Company structure ==
In 2022, Big Dutchman generated a revenue of €1.07 billion and employed 3,211 people.

The Big Dutchman network includes seven international logistics centers and counts livestock farmers from 100 countries among its customers, around 8,000 of them in Germany.

== Products ==
Big Dutchman sells housing equipment and feeding systems for egg production, poultry growing and pig farming. Big Dutchman concentrates on development, sales and logistics, while contractors, such as smaller metal construction companies, manufacture the products. The company is also active in the insect farming sector. A daughter company of Big Dutchman focuses on breeding black soldier fly larvae.

Big Dutchman works with the Dutch Ammerlaan Group, which designs greenhouse systems for the production of fruit, vegetables, leafy greens and flowers.
