= PMP Industries =

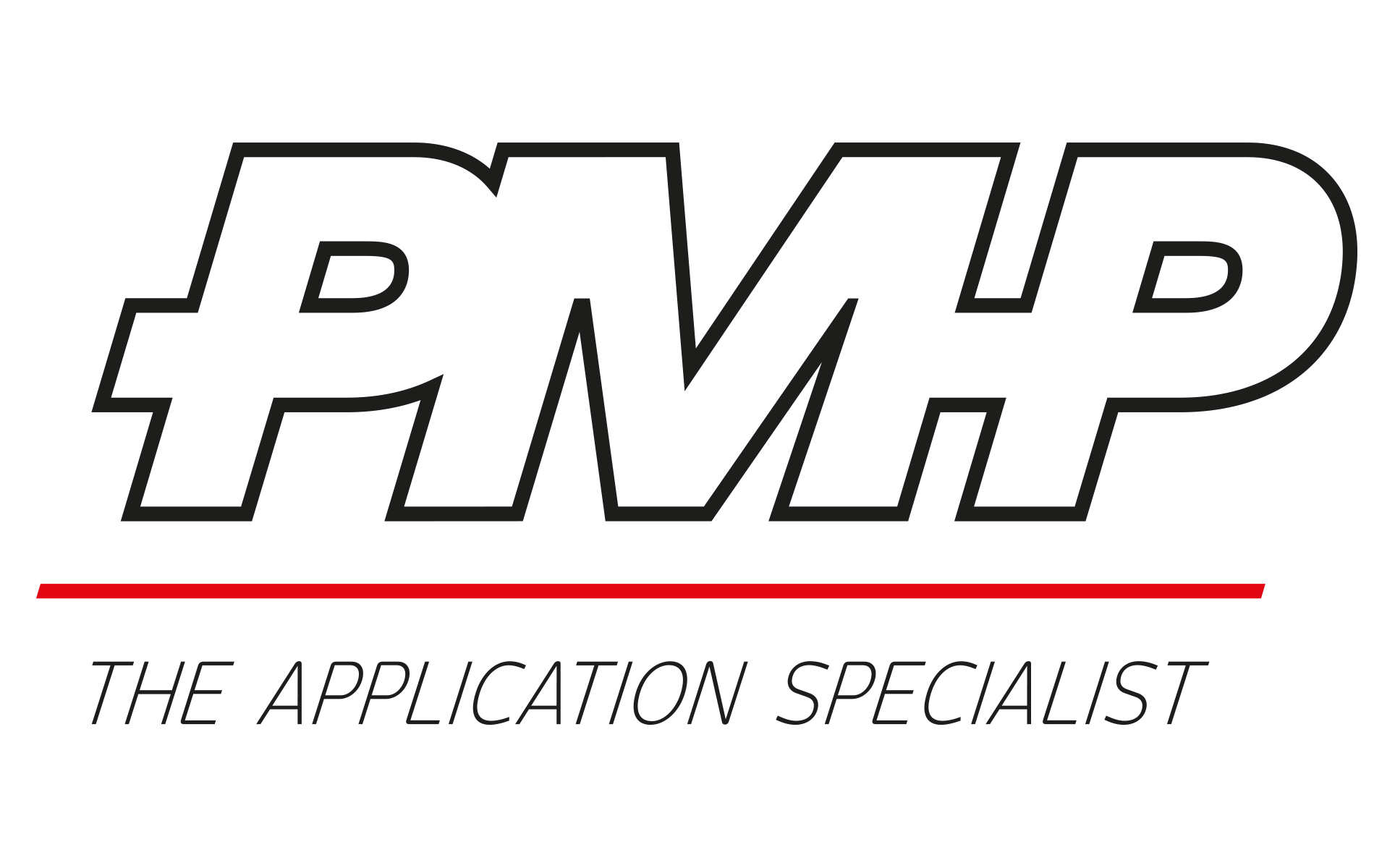
- PMP Industries logo
- Company type: S.p.A.
- Industry: AG & Forestry; Concrete; Earth moving; Material handling; Mining; Road construction
- Founded: 1991 in Italy
- Founder: Luigino Pozzo
- Headquarters: Coseano, Friuli-Venezia Giulia, Italy
- Area served: Europe, Americas, Asia
- Key people: Luigino Pozzo (President)
- Products: Planetary drives; Integrated planetary drives; Hydraulic motors; Hydraulic pumps
- Divisions: Power Transmission; Fluid Power; Electric Vehicle Driveline; Steel Works
- Website: www.pmp-industries.com

PMP Industries S.p.A. is an Italian worldwide manufacturer company of integrated solutions for machinery.

PMP Industries participated in EXCON and Agritechnica exhibitions.

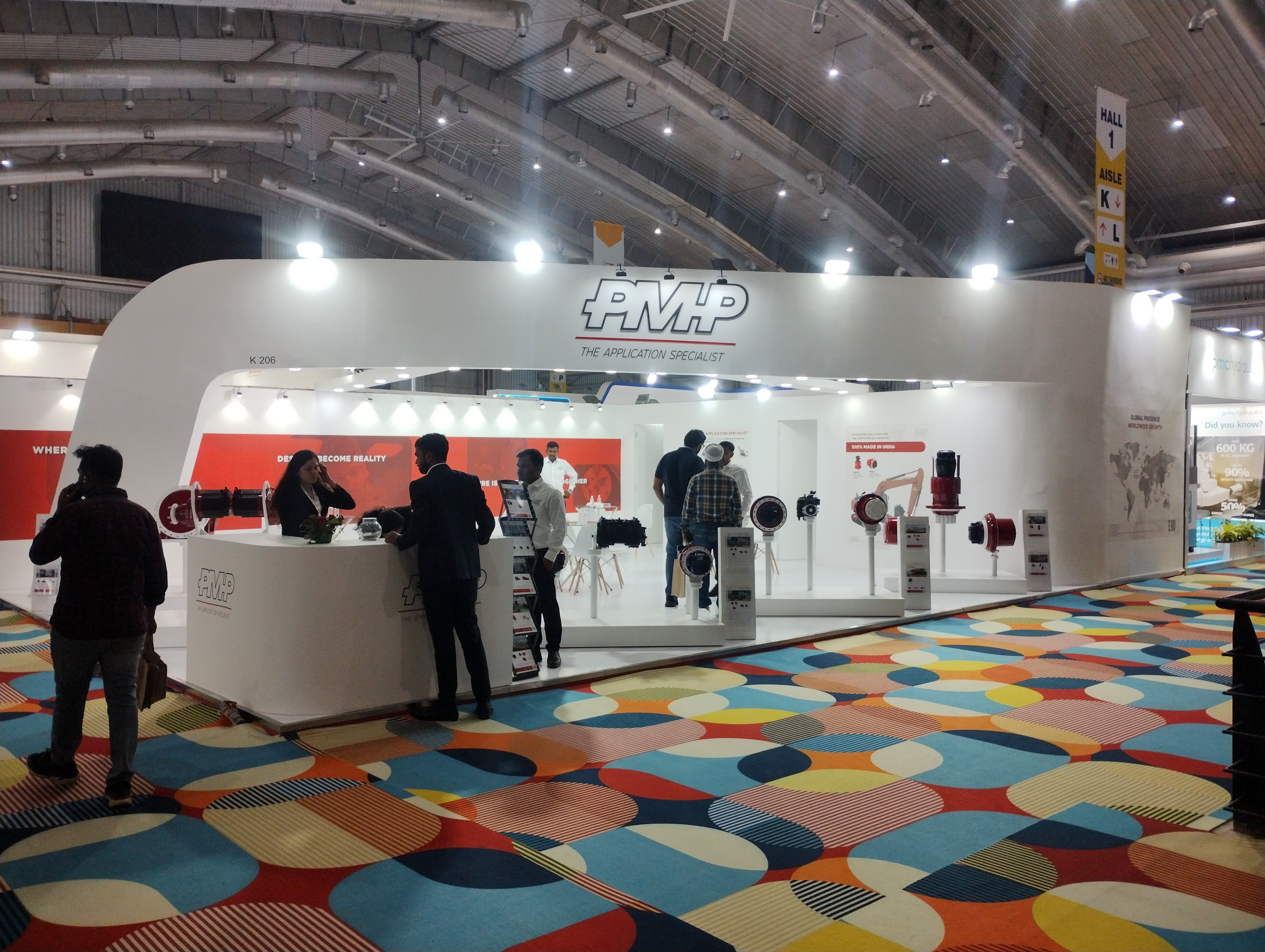
PMP at EXCON 2025, BIEC
