= Claeys (company) =

In 1906 Leon Claeys, a Belgian mechanic, started to build threshing machines. In 1909 he built his factory in Zedelgem, Belgium, to manufacture harvesting machines.

In 1952 Claeys produced the first European self-propelled combine harvester and by the 1960s, Claeys was one of the biggest combine manufacturers in Europe; in 1964 the majority of Claeys was acquired by Sperry New Holland. In 1967 the company changed its name to Clayson, and in 1986 it merged with Ford. In 1991 Ford was acquired by Fiatagri and became New Holland.

Claeys and Clayson combines
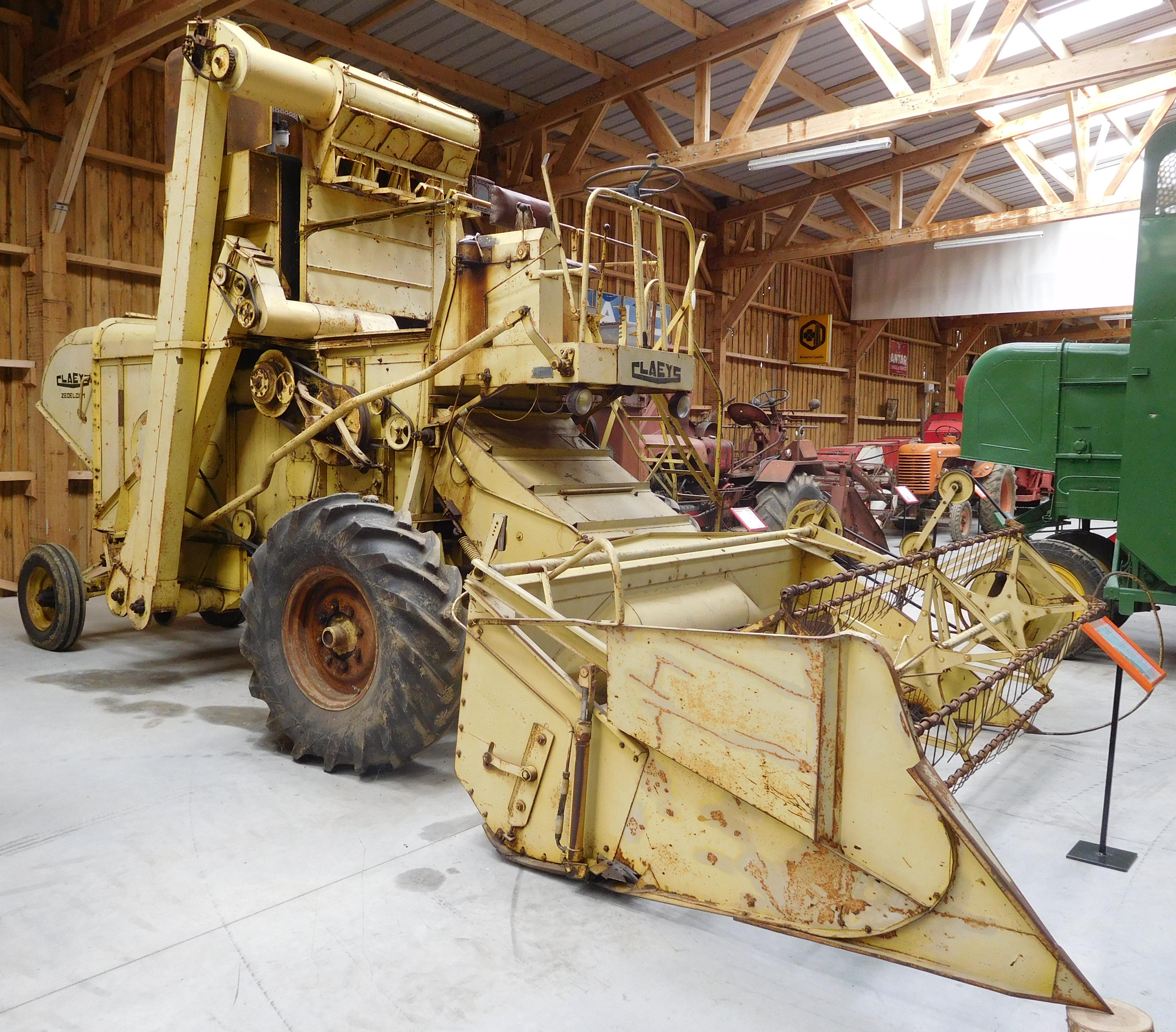
Claeys combine model MZ (1952-1960)

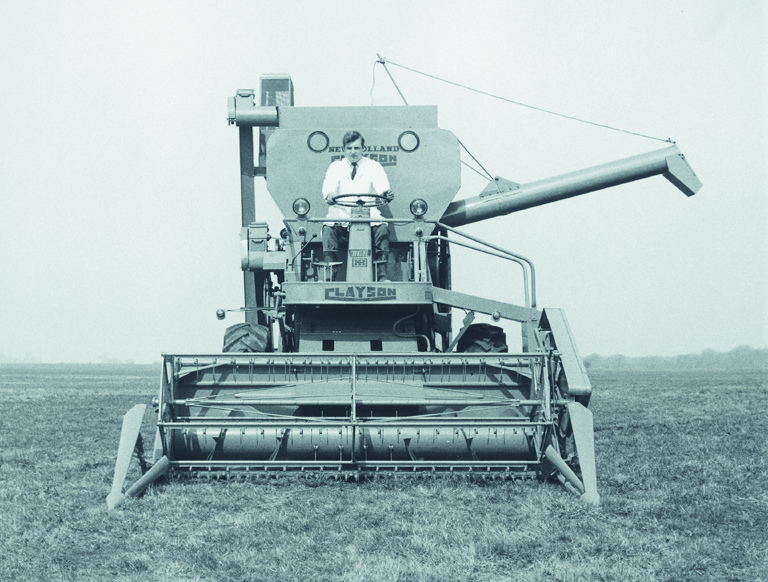
Clayson combine model M103 (1958-1967)

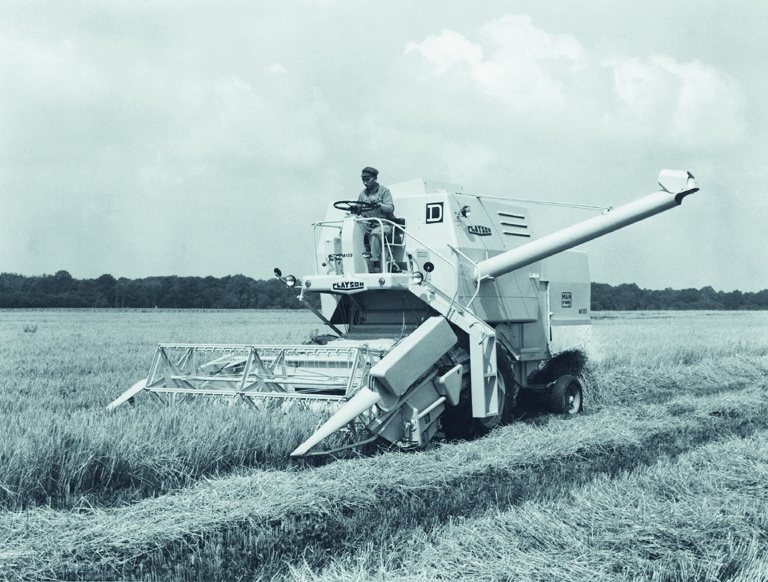
Clayson combine model M133 (1967-1973)

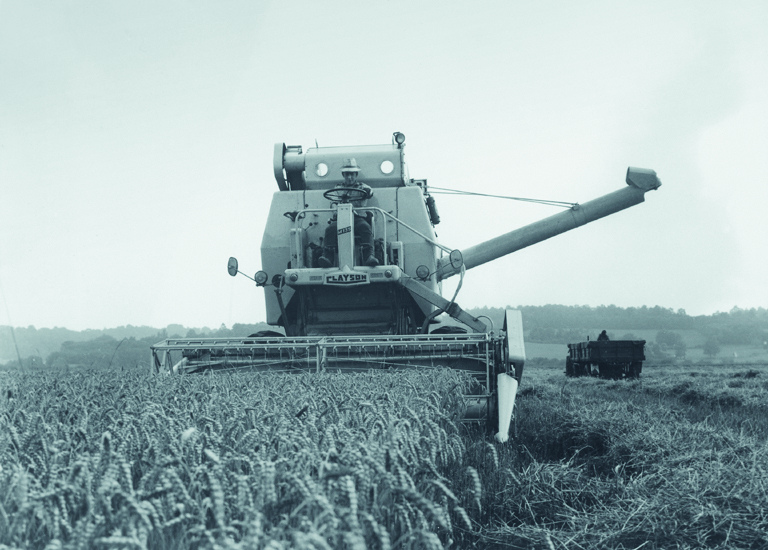
Clayson combine model M135 (1967-1973)

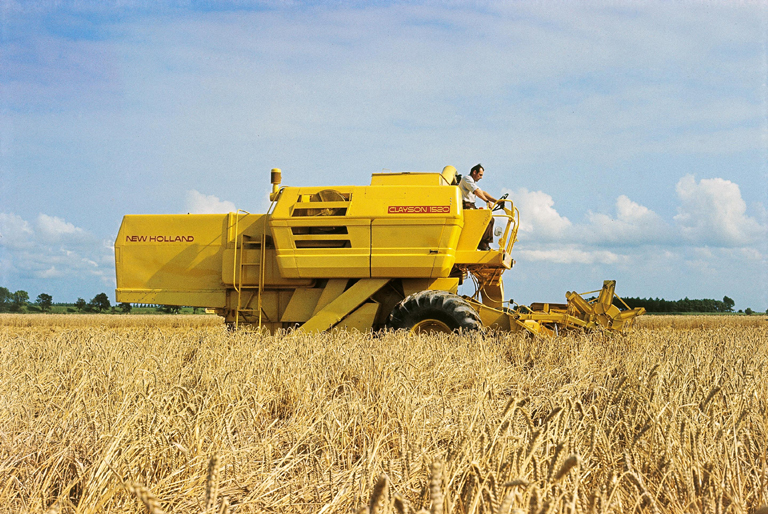
Clayson combine model 1520
