= American Society of Agricultural and Biological Engineers =

International Professional Society

- Formation: December 1907
- Type: Professional association
- Headquarters: St. Joseph, Michigan
- President: Doug Otto
- Website: www.asabe.org
- Formerly called: American Society of Agricultural Engineers

The American Society of Agricultural and Biological Engineers (ASABE) is an international professional society devoted to agricultural and biological engineering. It was founded in December 1907 at the University of Wisconsin–Madison as the American Society of Agricultural Engineers (ASAE) and is now based in St. Joseph, Michigan. Today the organization has about 9,000 members in over 100 countries. ASABE serves many functions: It provides a forum for communication of research findings through conferences, scientific journals, and a magazine; it develops standards of practice; and it provides opportunities for members to network. It cooperates with the Alpha Epsilon honor society.

After years of debate, members of the organization voted in 2005 to modify the name to better reflect the changes in the profession. For many years, the discipline had broadened to include engineering for biological systems, and the name change simply reflected this reality. Most of the university departments of agricultural engineering had already changed their names. The increase in biological engineering led to a number of breakthroughs that greatly affected the global agriculture system of modern society. Genetically modified organisms for instance have led to massive overhauls in food production, logistics and trade.

ASABE is the lead society in ABET evaluation for agricultural and biological academic program evaluation in the United States. It is a cooperating society for bioengineering/biomedical, environmental engineering and healthcare engineering technology.

ASABE encourages engineering excellence through professional licensure. The society's committee on licensure maintains and enhances the professionalism of the members of ASABE by providing services related to the national Principles and Practices Examination (PE Exam) for agricultural and biological engineering.

Organization

ASABE comprises eight technical communities that advance the mission of the organization through publishing, continuing professional development, and standards development: Applied Science and Engineering Energy Systems Ergonomics, Safety, and Health Information Technology, Sensors, and Control Systems Machinery Systems Natural Resources and Environment Systems Plant, Animal and Facility Systems Processing Systems

Since 2020, the Society has launched two major initiatives:

The Alliance for Moderninzing African Agrifood Systems presents a holistic approach to accelerate improvements in the food-crop value chains in Sub-Saharan Africa.

The Circular Bioeconomy Systems Institute aims to advance the circular transformation of food systems and allow ASABE members and partners to build across systems.

Publications The society publishes four peer-reviewed journals: Journal of the ASABE Applied Engineering in Agriculture Journal of Agricultural Safety and Health Journal of Natural Resources and Agricultural Ecosystems
