= Agritechnica =

Trade fair held in Hanover, Germany

- trade fair for agricultural machinery
- Country: Germany
- Location: Hanover, Germany
- Organiser: German Agricultural Society

Agritechnica is world's largest trade fair for agricultural technology. It is held in Hanover, Germany, and is organized by DLG (German Agricultural Society).

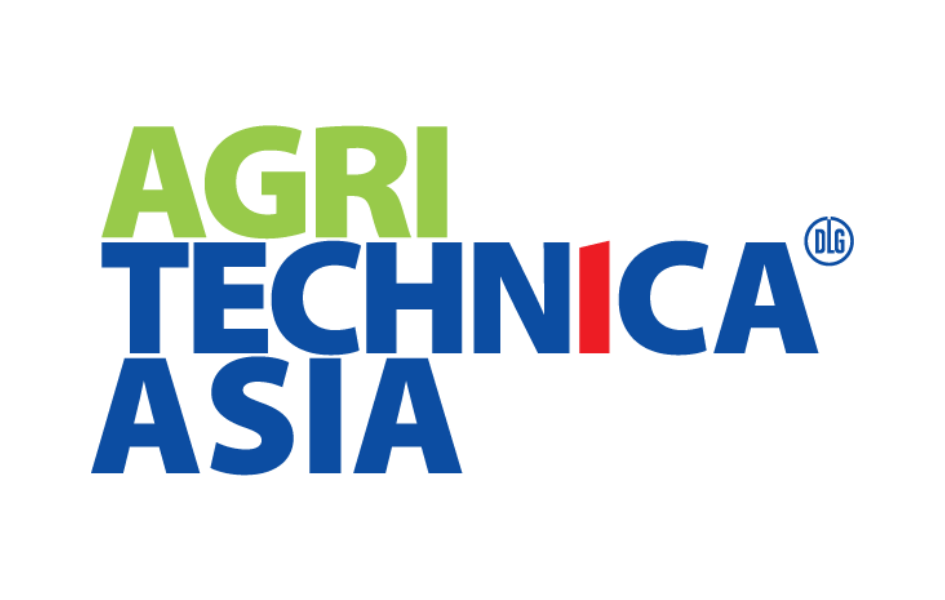
Agritechnica Asia logo

== Event ==
Agritechnica 2025 had 2,849 exhibitors from 52 countries and 476,000 visitors from 171 countries.

== Media gallery ==
Agritechnica 2025
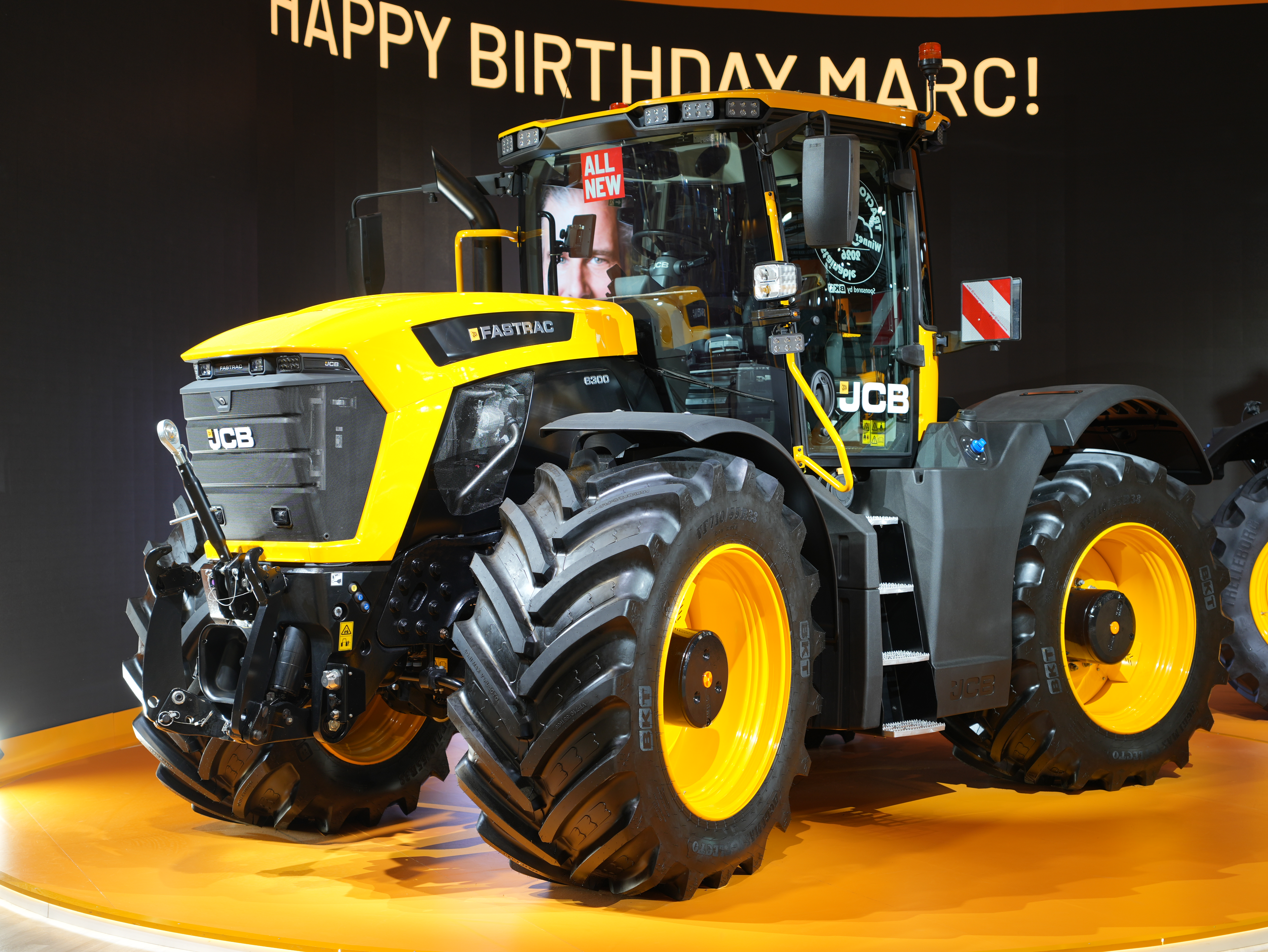

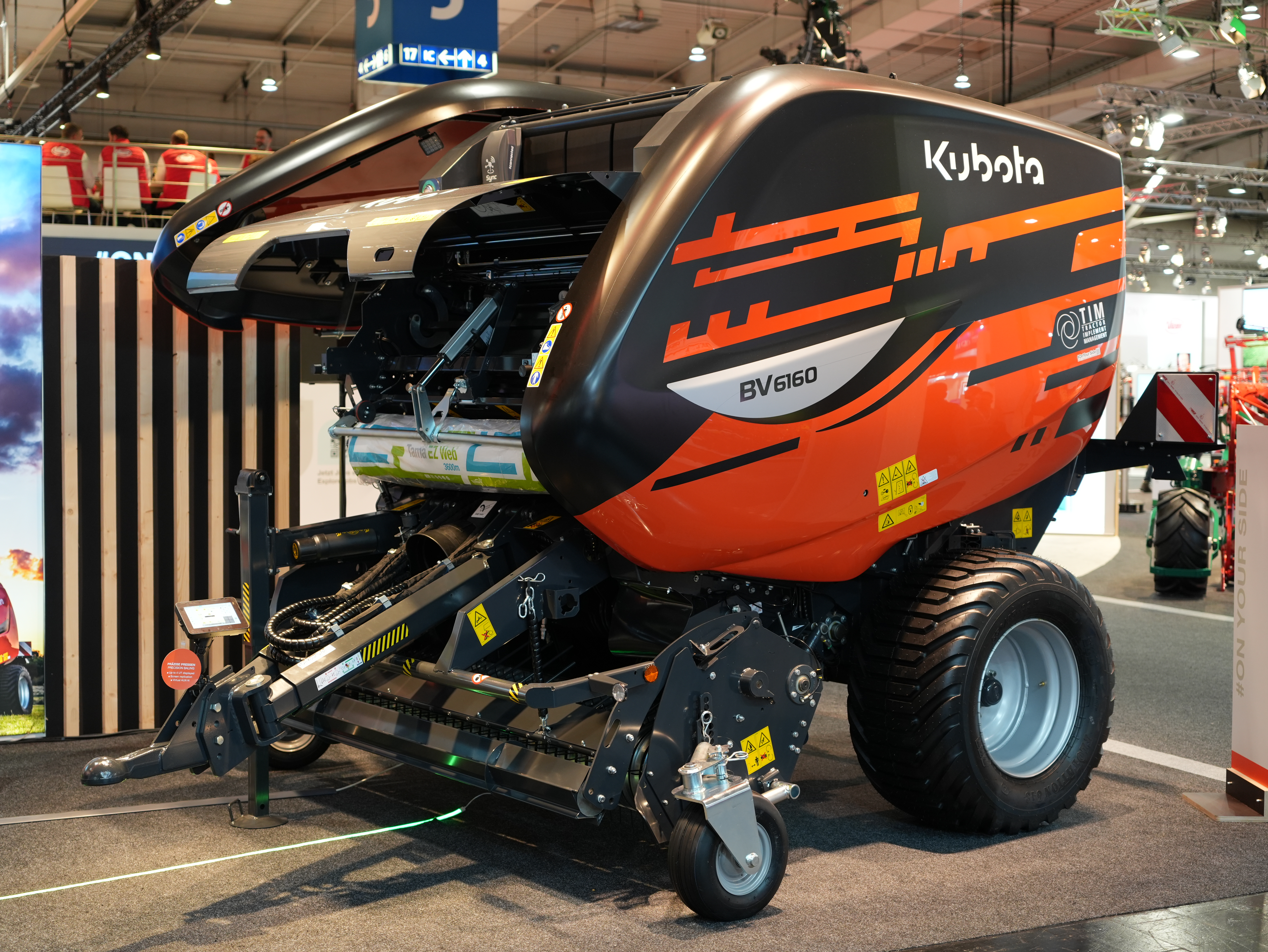

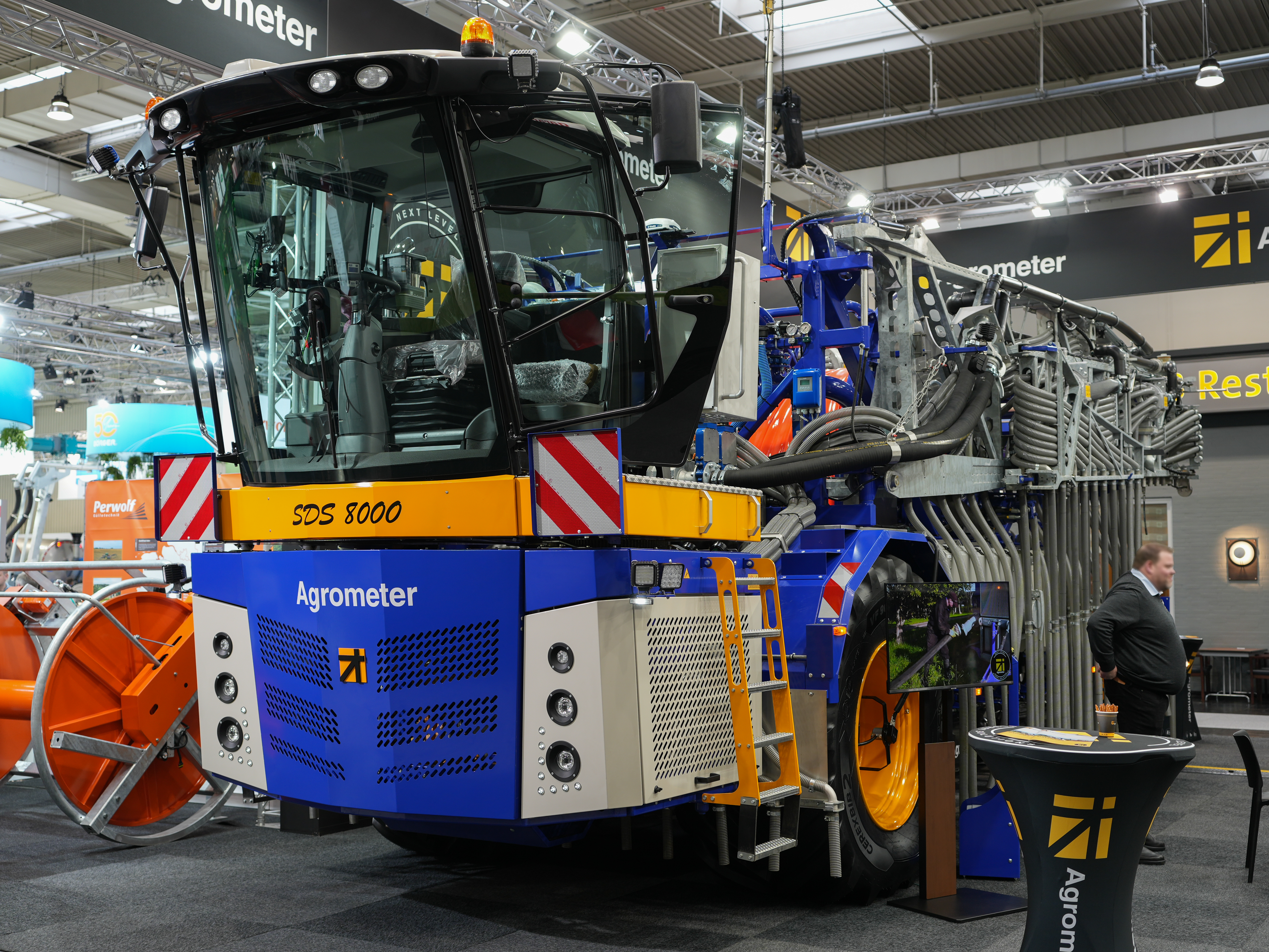

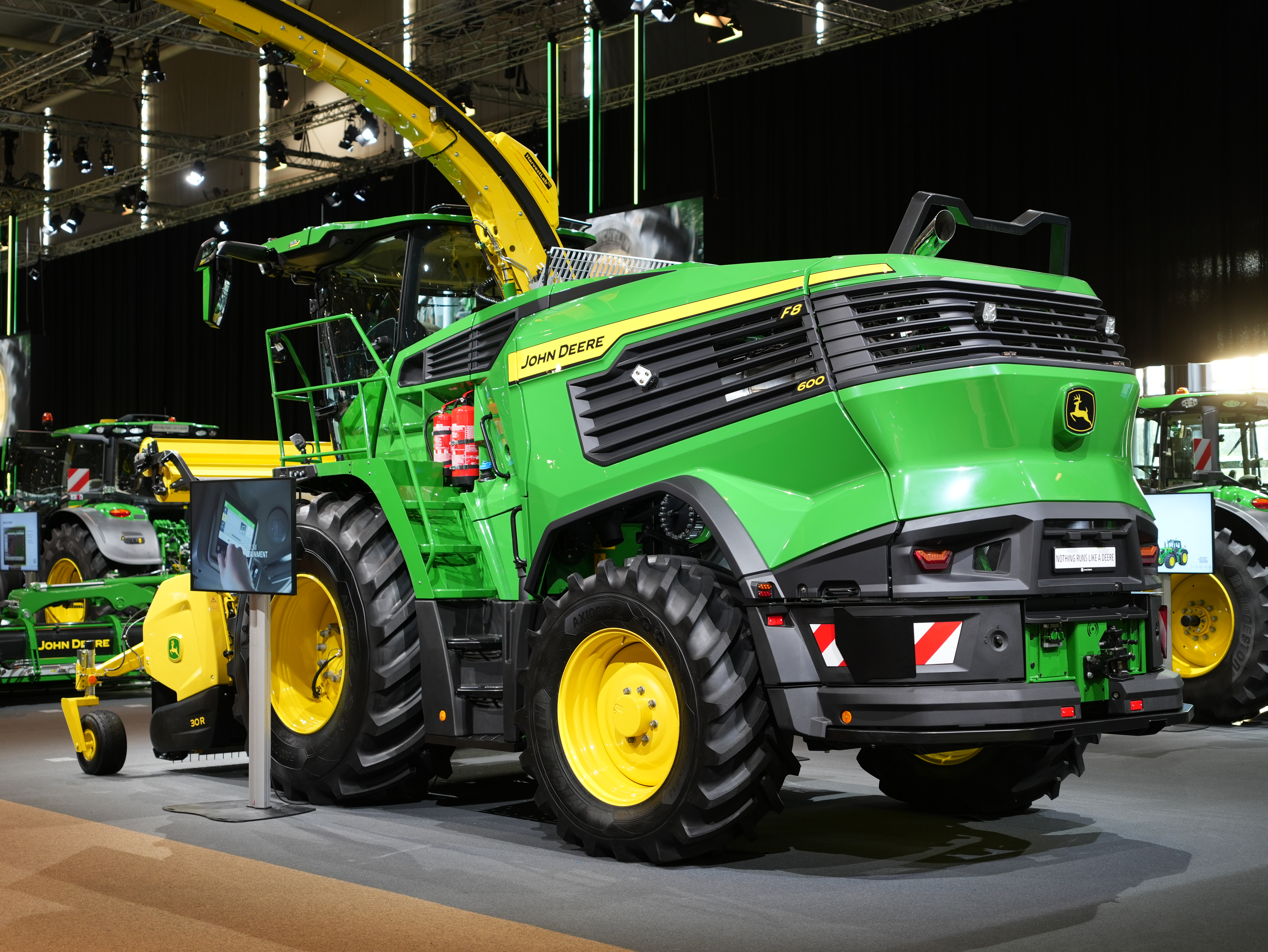

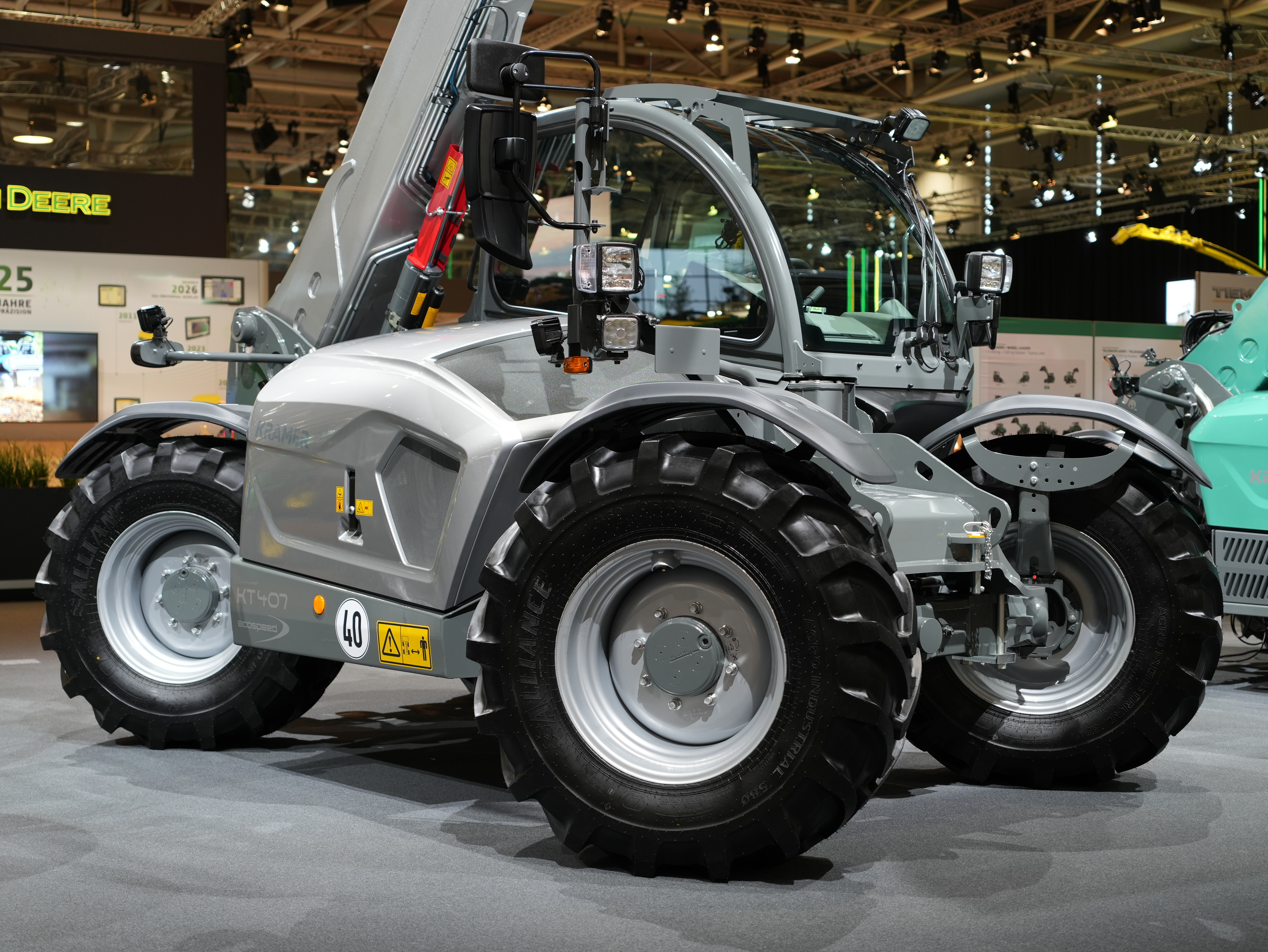

== See also ==
- Bauma, world's largest trade fair in the construction industry
- EXCON, South Asia's largest trade fair in the construction industry
- International Motor Show Germany, known natively as Internationale Automobil-Ausstellung
