= German Agricultural Society =

The German Agricultural Society (Deutsche Landwirtschafts-Gesellschaft), commonly known as DLG, is an international non-profit organisation serving the agricultural industry in Germany. DLG was founded in 1885 by Max Eyth, has over 23,000 members as of 2011 and is headquartered in Frankfurt am Main. Its main purpose is to promote technical progress and scientific advances in the food and agricultural industry, including setting standards.

== Activities ==
The main activities of DLG are:

- Arrangement of seminars and other educational activities for its members
- Advise to members
- Publication of books and magazines related to the food and agriculture industry
- Testing of food and beverage products, including wine, which may qualify for a "DLG Award" which can then be displayed on the product.
- Testing of agricultural machinery
- Participation in international trade fairs

The DLG organises agricultural trade fairs and exhibitions such as Agritechnica, EuroTier, Anuga FoodTec, PotatoEurope, and DLG Field Days.

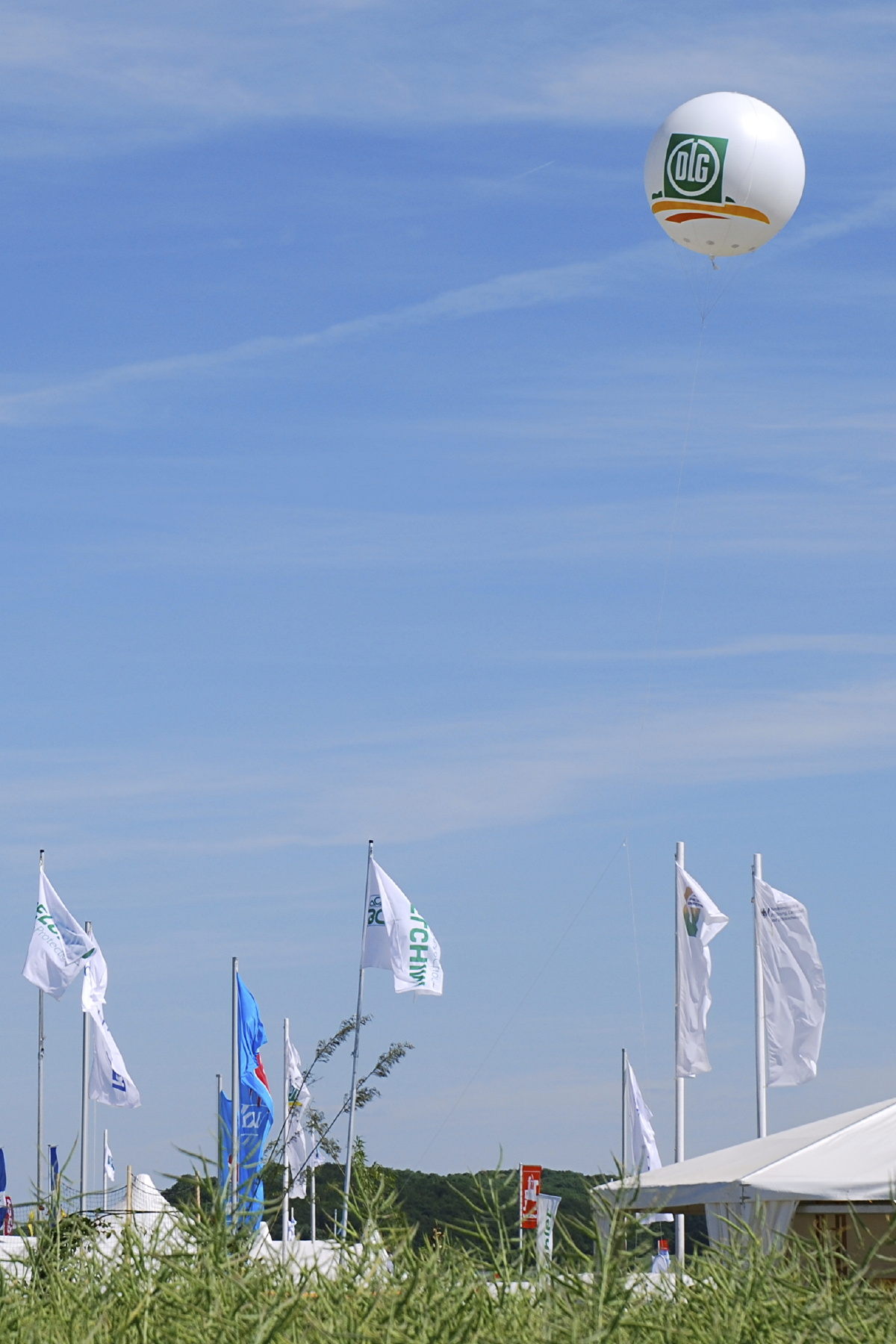
DLG balloon at DLG Field Days 2010

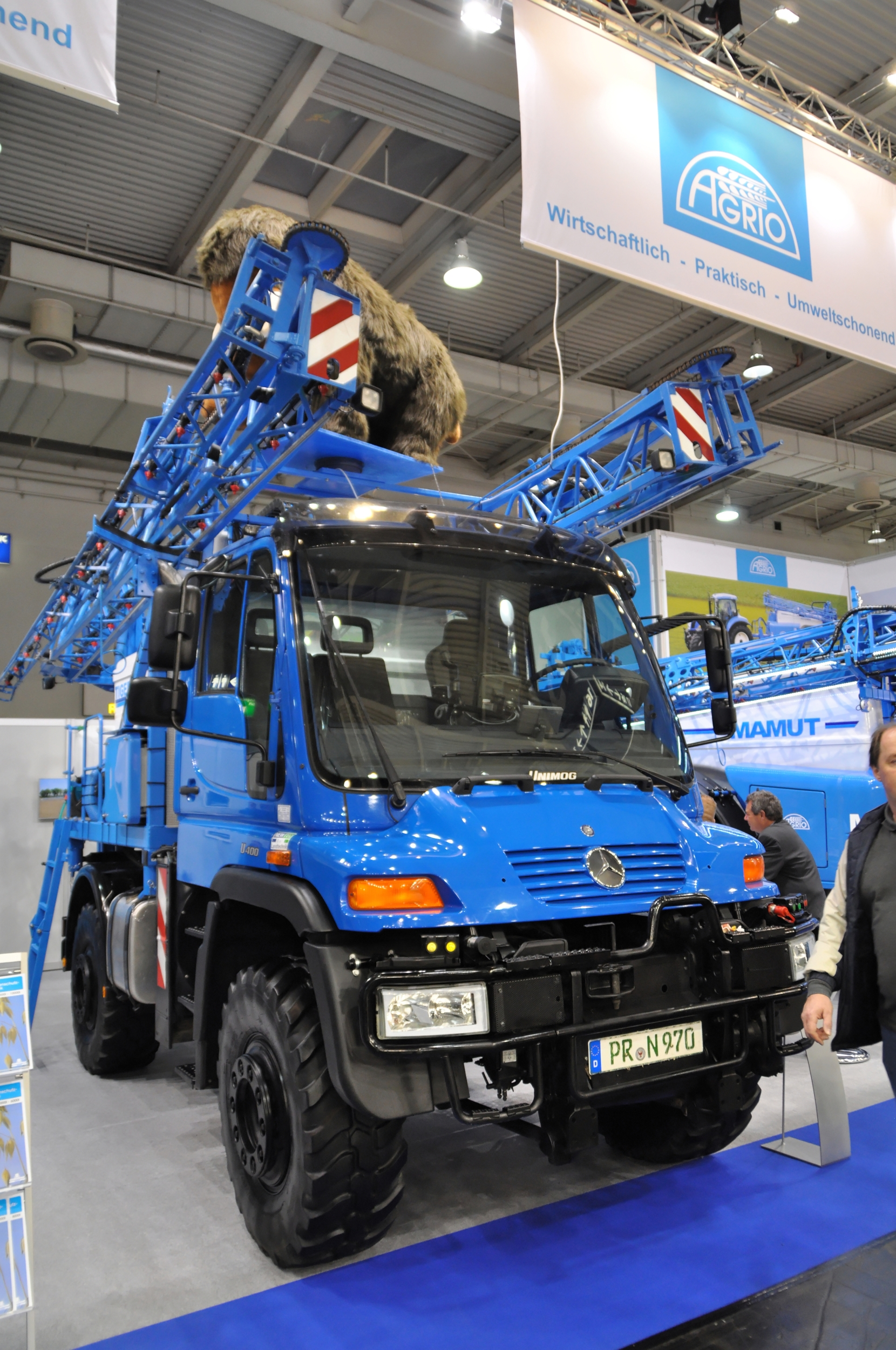
Unimog at Agritechnica 2011

== Wine activities ==
In the area of German wine, DLG has been responsible for devising the assessment scale used for official classification as well the medals and awards that are handed out regionally and nationally. This is a five-point scale where the wines are assessed blind (i.e., the tasters don't know the identity of the wine in the glass) by a panel and given points in the three categories bouquet ("nose"), taste and harmony. The category "harmony" refers to all sensory impressions, including color, and is concerned with the overall balance between sweetness, acidity, alcohol and "body"/mouthfeel of the wine. Each category is assessed on the scale 0-5 (fractional points may be awarded), and the points given are then averaged, with the same weight given to the three categories. For a wine to be given its quality control test number (A.P. Number for Amtliche Prüfung) necessary to display a Prädikat designation of the German wine classification, a minimum of 1.5 out of 5 is necessary in all three categories, otherwise the wine is denied a classification.
