= Peintres de la Réalité =

The Peintres de la Réalité [pɛ͂tʀ də la ʀealite] (French for "Painters of Reality") were founded after the Second World War by Henri Cadiou to connect artists who were specialized on still life and genre motifs. It later evolved to the Mouvement trompe l'oeil / Réalité. The painting of the group is no reappearance of antiquity or of the 17th century, but the logical consequence of the place in the 20th century development of a realism that has taken over the sequence of surrealism to the modern trompe-l'œil to lead.

1973, the group exhibited at the Cultural Center of New York and the Corcoran Gallery in Washington. In 1989, after the death of Henri Cadiou, Pierre Gilou continued his father's work within the group. In 1993, the group had a sensational success as part of the Grand Palais in Paris, the exhibition "le triomphe du trompe-l'oeil" had more than 65,000 visitors in two weeks.

== Members ==
The following were the first members in the international exhibition of the Peintres de la Réalité in 1955, in the gallery Marforen, Paris:

- Jacques Abeille (France)
- Jos Albert (Belgium)
- Mariano Andréu (Spain)
- Pietro Annigoni (Italy)
- François Baboulet (France)
- Martin Battersby (Great Britain)
- Henri Cadiou (France)
- Franco A. Ghisotti (Italy)
- Fernand Guery-Colas (France)
- Liselotte Heckmann (Deutschland)
- Robert Jeannisson (France)
- Cornelius Postma (The Netherlands)
- Werner Schramm (Deutschland)
- Gregorio Sciltian (Italy)
- Claude Yvel (France)
