= St. Peter und Alexander (Aschaffenburg) =

Coordinates: 49°58′25″N 9°8′47″E

- Stiftskirche Aschaffenburg; Kollegiatsstift St. Peter und Alexander; Basilica and Collegiate Church of Saints Peter and Alexander
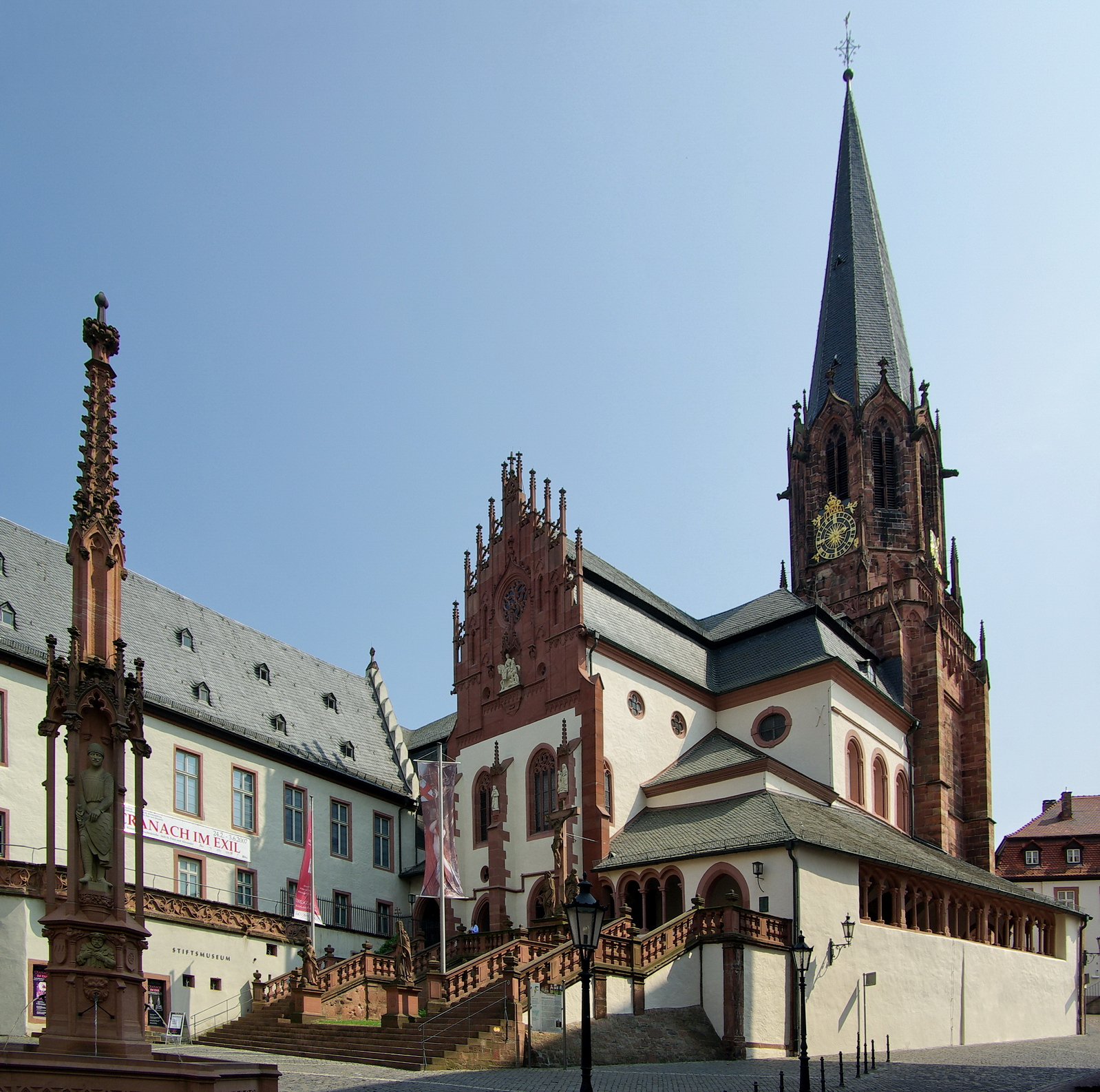
- View of the church from Stiftsplatz

- Location within Bavaria Location within Germany
- Location: Aschaffenburg, Lower Franconia, Bavaria
- Address: Stiftsgasse 3
- Country: Germany
- Denomination: Catholic
- Website: www.stiftsbasilika.de

History
- Status: active
- Dedication: Saint Peter and Saint Alexander
- Earlier dedication: Michael the Archangel

Architecture
- Functional status: Collegiate church, Minor basilica
- Heritage designation: Baudenkmal of Bavaria
- Architectural type: Basilica
- Style: Romanesque, Gothic
- Years built: Mid-10th century–1490

Administration
- Diocese: Würzburg
- Parish: Pfarreiengemeinschaft St. Martin (since 2006)

St. Peter und Alexander (also Stiftskirche Aschaffenburg or collegiate church Aschaffenburg or Basilica of SS. Peter and Alexander) is a Catholic church located in Aschaffenburg, Bavaria, Germany. It is the town's oldest church, established in the 10th century, dedicated to Saint Peter and Saint Alexander. The main building was built as a Roman basilica, while other phases were built in the early Gothic style. The current structure is a cruciform basilica, reflecting a variety of styles including a Romanesque nave from the 12th century and a 15th-century tower.

The church is also notable for its Renaissance painting Beweinung Christi by Matthias Grünewald and the 10th-century Triumphkreuz. The Stiftskirche is open to the public and serves as a Roman Catholic parish church. A museum in the former chapter house exhibits church treasures and other historical artifacts.

The associated collegiate church was classified historical monument of Bavaria. Situated on top of a hill, the church has good views of the city of Aschaffenburg. The architecture of the monastery reflects different periods, from pre-Romanesque to the seventeenth century, although most of the current buildings date back to the 12th and 13th centuries.

== History ==
A monastery of the Benedictines was established at this location in the 8th century, dedicated to St. Michael. During the second half of the 10th century, this was transformed into the Kollegiatstift St. Peter und Alexander, a collegiate church.

In 974, the Stift was first mentioned in a document by Emperor Otto II in which he gifted his churches at Salz and Brendlorenzen (near Neustadt/Saale) as well as several other territories, including a sizeable area of the Spessart hills to the Stift. This was intended as a favour to his nephew, Otto I, Duke of Swabia and Bavaria. This Otto was long regarded as the founder of the Stift, which is why he is honoured by a statue in the church. The real founders were Otto's parents, Liudolf, a son of Emperor Otto I and Ida, daughter of Duke Hermann of Swabia. The most likely date is the year 957. Liudolf died that same year during a campaign in Italy and was later buried at Mainz. Thus his role as a founder of the Aschaffenburg Stift was forgotten. His son Otto died from an epidemic in Lucca in 982 but was buried at Aschaffenburg by Archbishop Willigis of Mainz. His tomb was next to that of Liutgard (died 885), the widow of King Ludwig III.

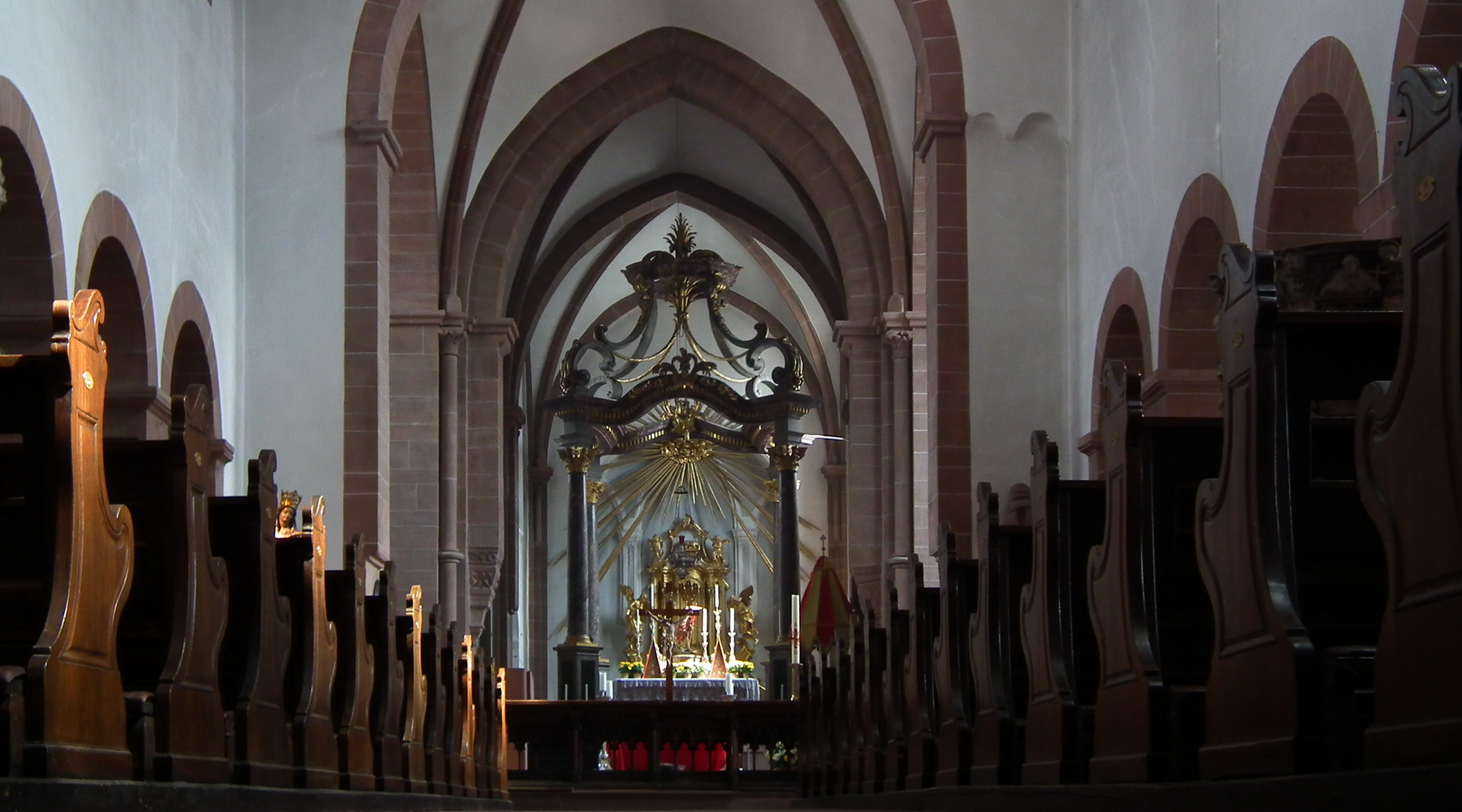
Interior of the nave with high altar

It is not clear when exactly construction on the church that replaced the earlier Carolingian structure began, but it was around the middle of the 10th century.

Mainz, which inherited Aschaffenburg on Otto's death in 982, later extended its influence over the operation of the Stift and after 1262 the chapter was forced to always chose a Mainz canon as its Probst.

The nave was completed in the 12th century. In the early 13th century, the transept, east choir as well as the western and north western portals were finished. The late-Romanesque Buntsandstein cloister was built 1220–60. In 1490, the tower was added. Around 1772 the Baroque altar replaced the Gothic high altar.

During secularization the Stift was dissolved at the beginning of the 19th century. In 1821, the region became part of the Diocese of Würzburg and the collegiate church was made a parish church. Until this point, the Stift had supplied the priests for the other Aschaffenburg churches, St. Agatha and Unsere liebe Frau.

The church was damaged by Allied bombing in World War II, but most of the works of art survived.

In 1956, anthropologists from the University of Mainz opened the 13th-century sarcophagi and confirmed that they indeed held the remains of Otto I, Liutgard and her daughter Hildegard.

In 1957, the church and its associated buildings were transferred to the Kirchenstiftung Sankt Peter und Alexander, a foundation. In 1958, celebrating its 1,000th anniversary, Pope Pius XII made the church a Basilica minor.

== Description ==
Access to the church is via a large Baroque staircase from Stiftsplatz with statues of Peter and Alexander at the bottom and a larger-than-life crucifixion group from 1699 at the top. The tympanon above the main entrance shows Christ at the Last Judgment, flanked by Peter and Alexander.

The main church building is a cruciform basilica, mostly Romanesque and early Gothic, completed in the 12th century. The tall Gothic tower with its octagonal upper floors was added at the end of the 15th century. The Stiftskapitelhaus (chapter house), with interiors from the 15th to 17th centuries, is located beyond the late Romanesque cloister. It now houses the Stiftsmuseum (see below).

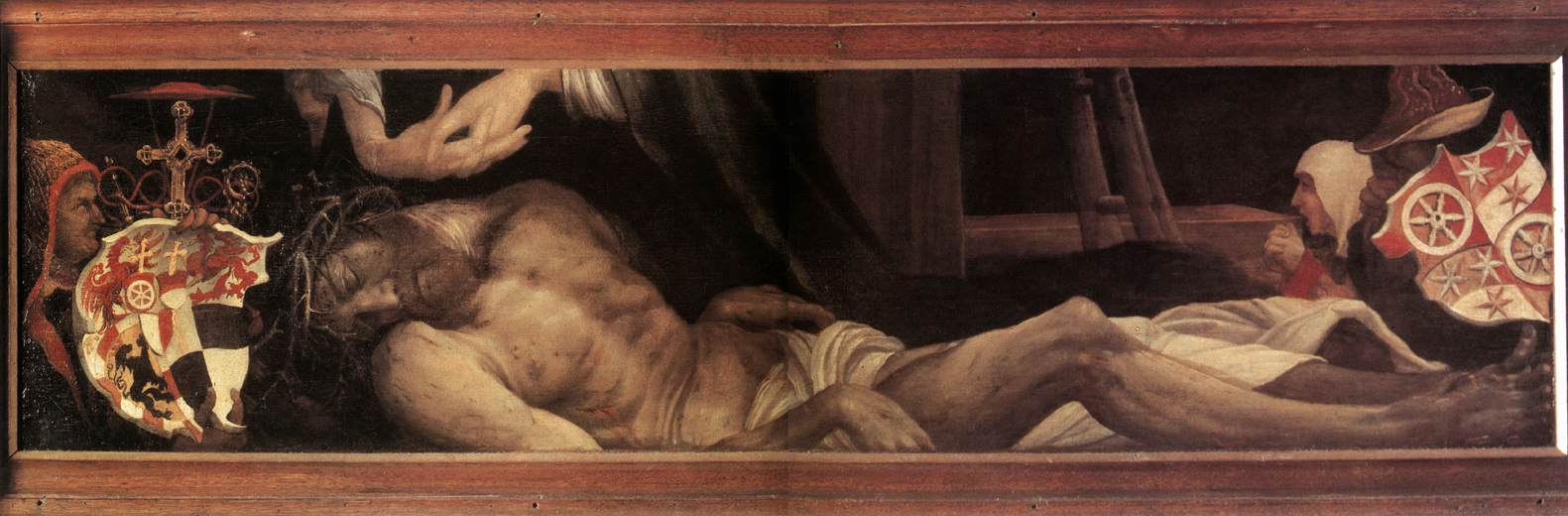
Beweinung Christi

The best known work of art at the church is the Beweinung Christi by Renaissance painter Matthias Grünewald, who originally made five paintings for the church. Most of these were given away in the 18th century, however, including the Stuppach Madonna, originally made for the Maria Schnee Kappelle in this church (now present as a reproduction). The Beweinung was created ca. 1525, likely as the predella of a crucifixion altar. It was probably one of Grünewald's last works. The Maria Schnee Kapelle to the north of the nave was dedicated in 1516, but a Gothic Revival gable was added in 1870.

Another notable piece of art is a larger-than-life Romanesque crucifix (Triumphkreuz), now on the northern wall of the middle aisle. Its origin have long been debated. Previously thought to date from the first half of the 12th century, Radiocarbon dating has recently indicated that it was likely made around the year 980.

The canopied Baroque altar with four marble columns from around 1772 was created by Johann Michael Heinle. The side walls of the choir contain alcoves with the tombs of Liutgard and Hildegard (left) and Duke Otto (right). The pulpit is late-Renaissance/early Baroque (ca. 1600), likely made by Hans Juncker, to whom the grey marble and alabaster Magdalenaltar (1617) is also attributed.

The last Elector of Mainz, Friedrich Karl Joseph von Erthal (died 1802) is buried in the church, in a Neoclassical tomb.

== Today ==
The Stiftsmuseum, located next to the church, today shows (among other historical exhibits) the church treasures of the Stift, including an altar from the workshop of Lucas Cranach the Elder. A 15th-century reliquary of St. Alexander is said to contain the top of the saint's skull.

== Gallery ==
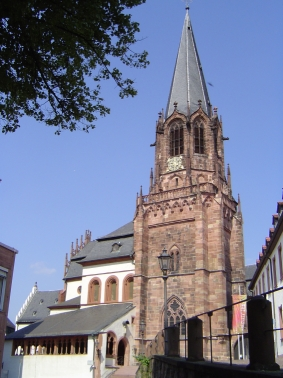
Exterior view

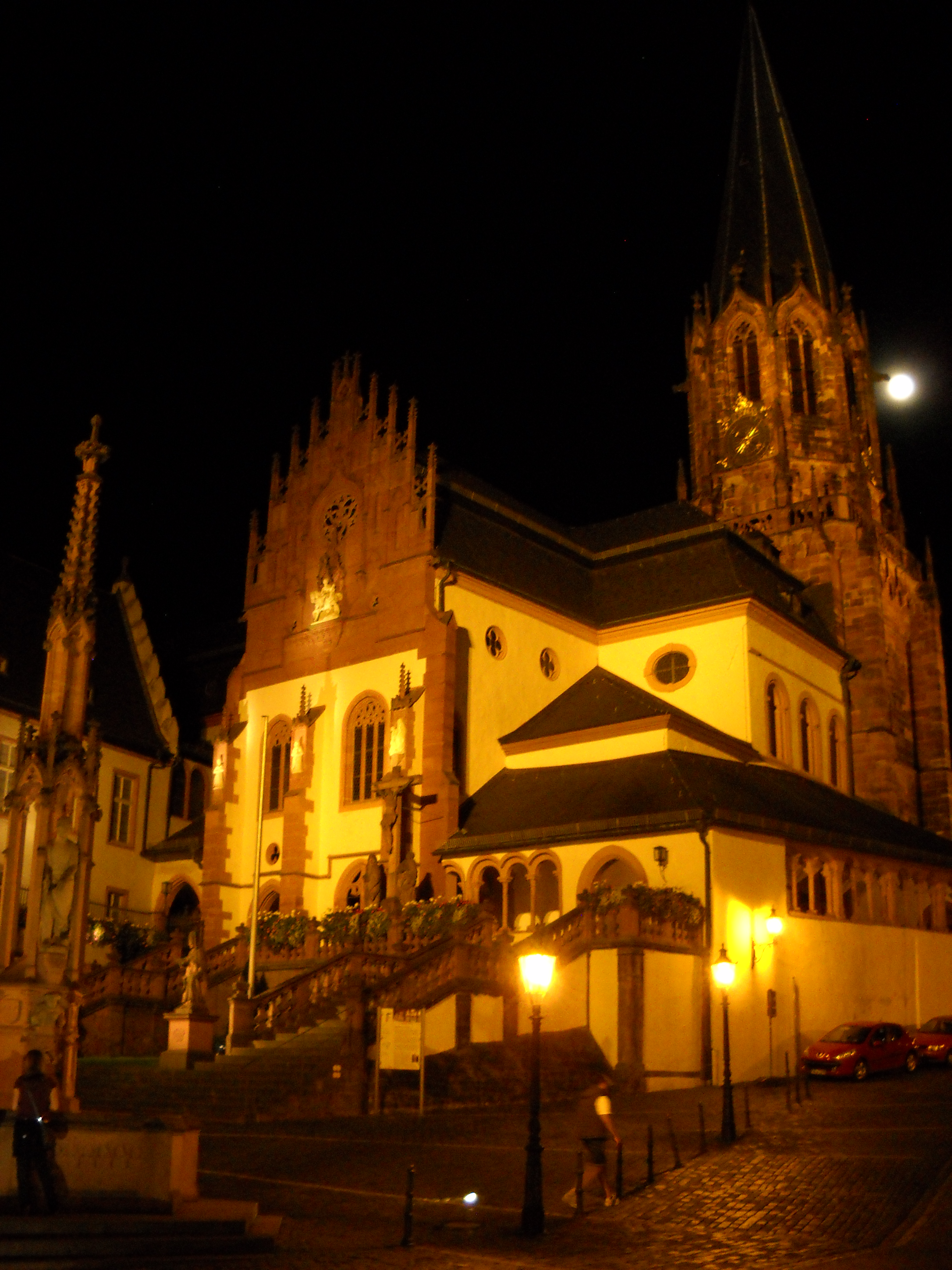
The basilica at night

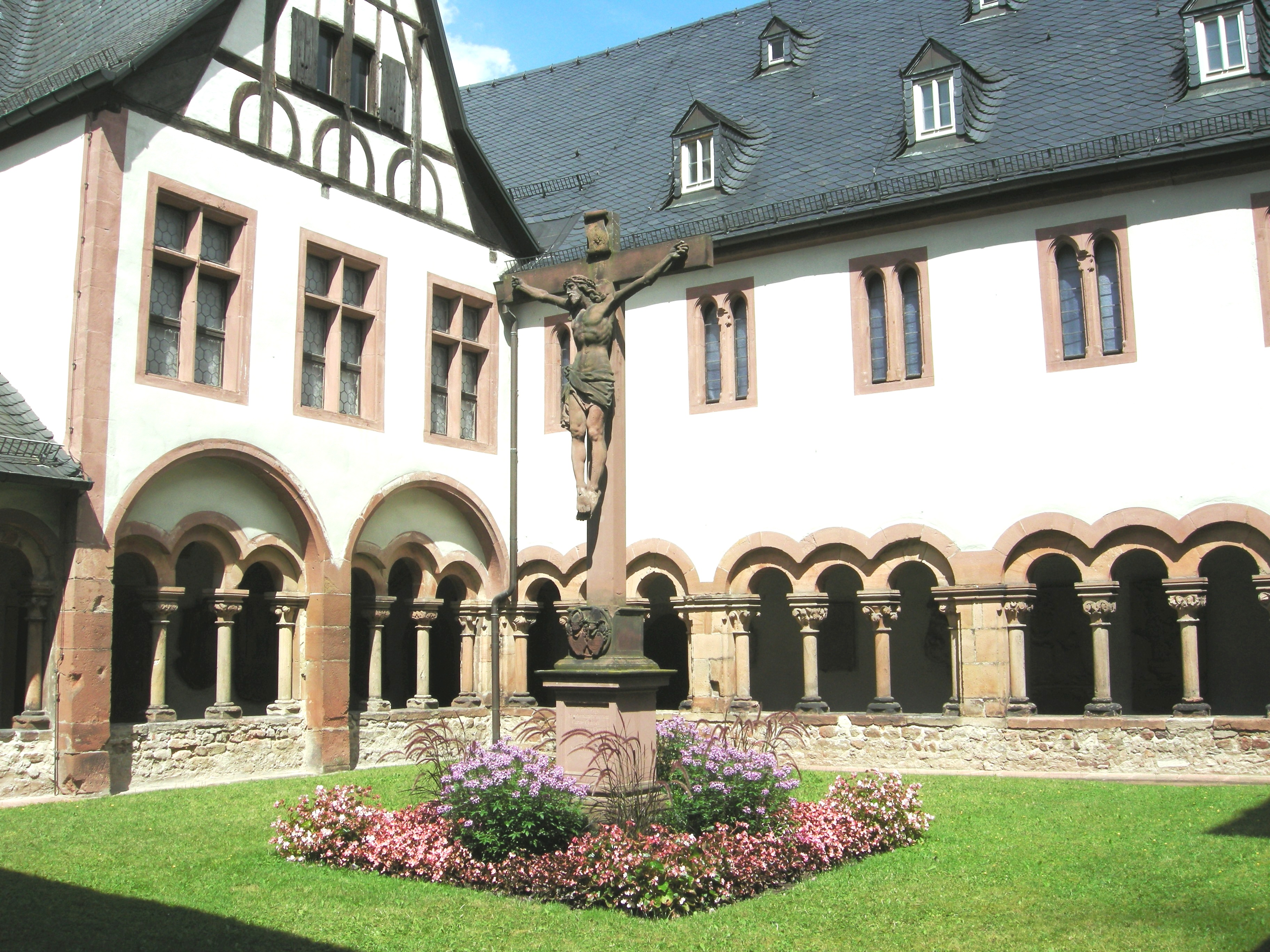
Cloister

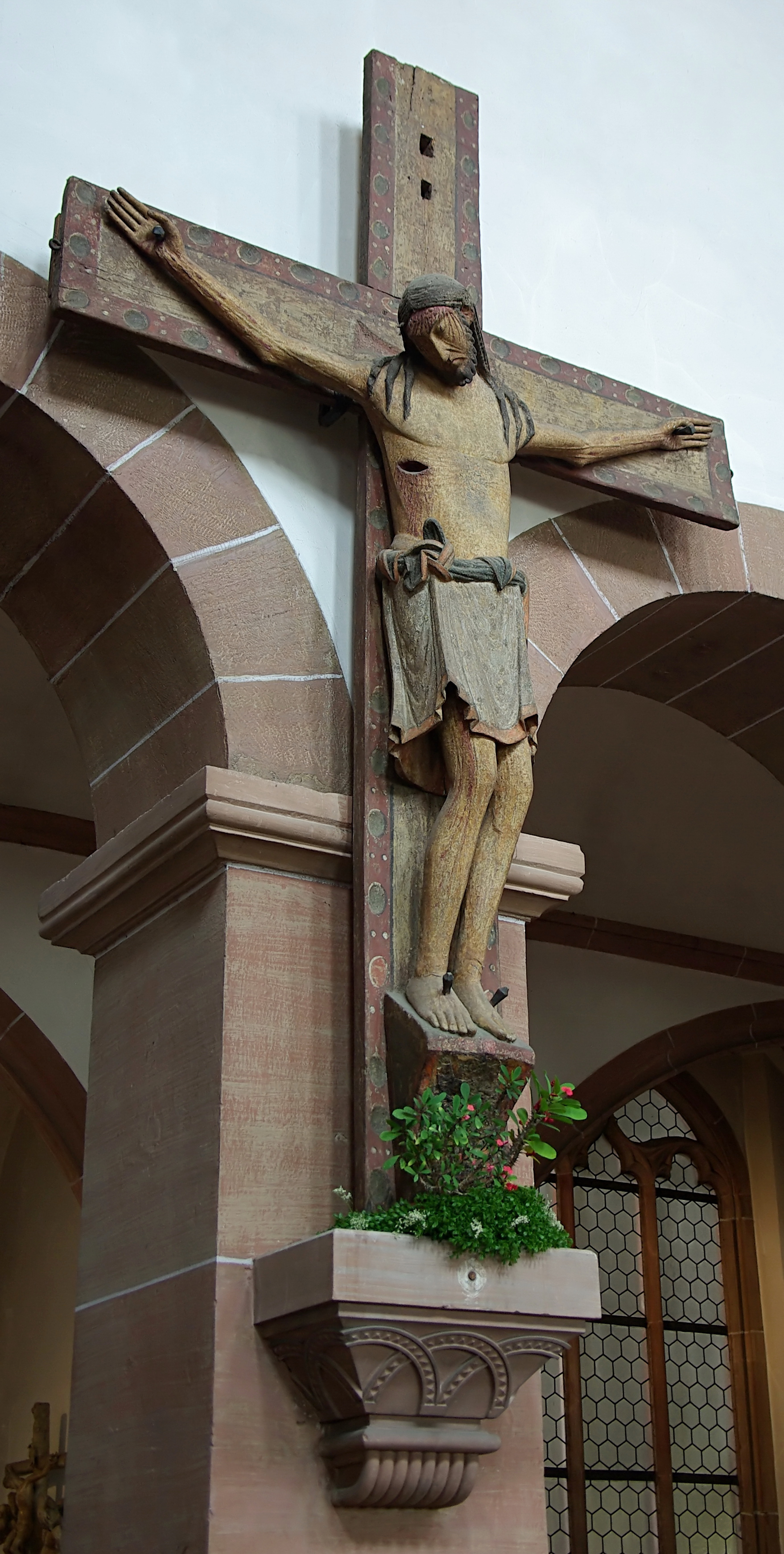
Triumphkreuz (c. 980)

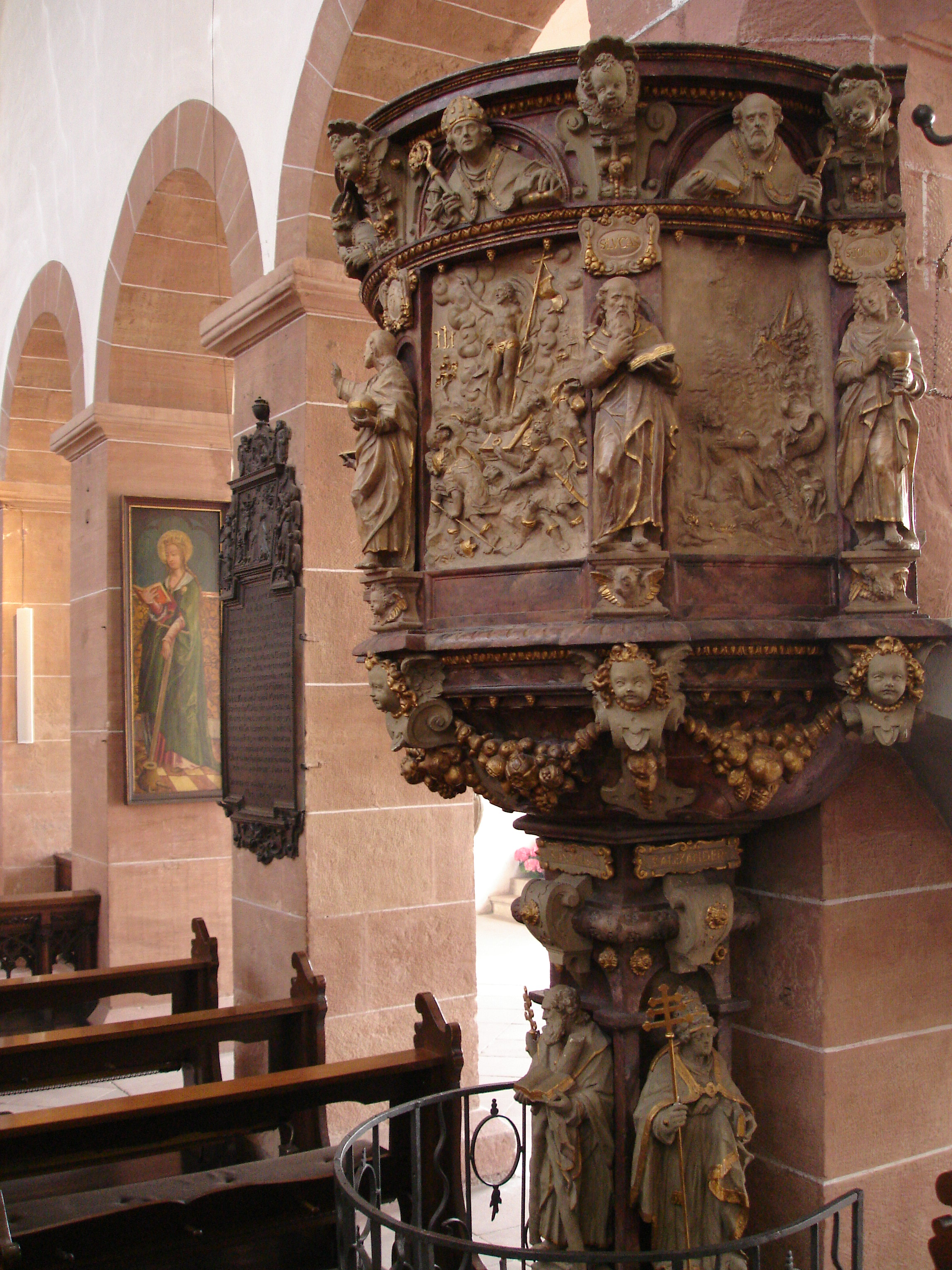
Pulpit

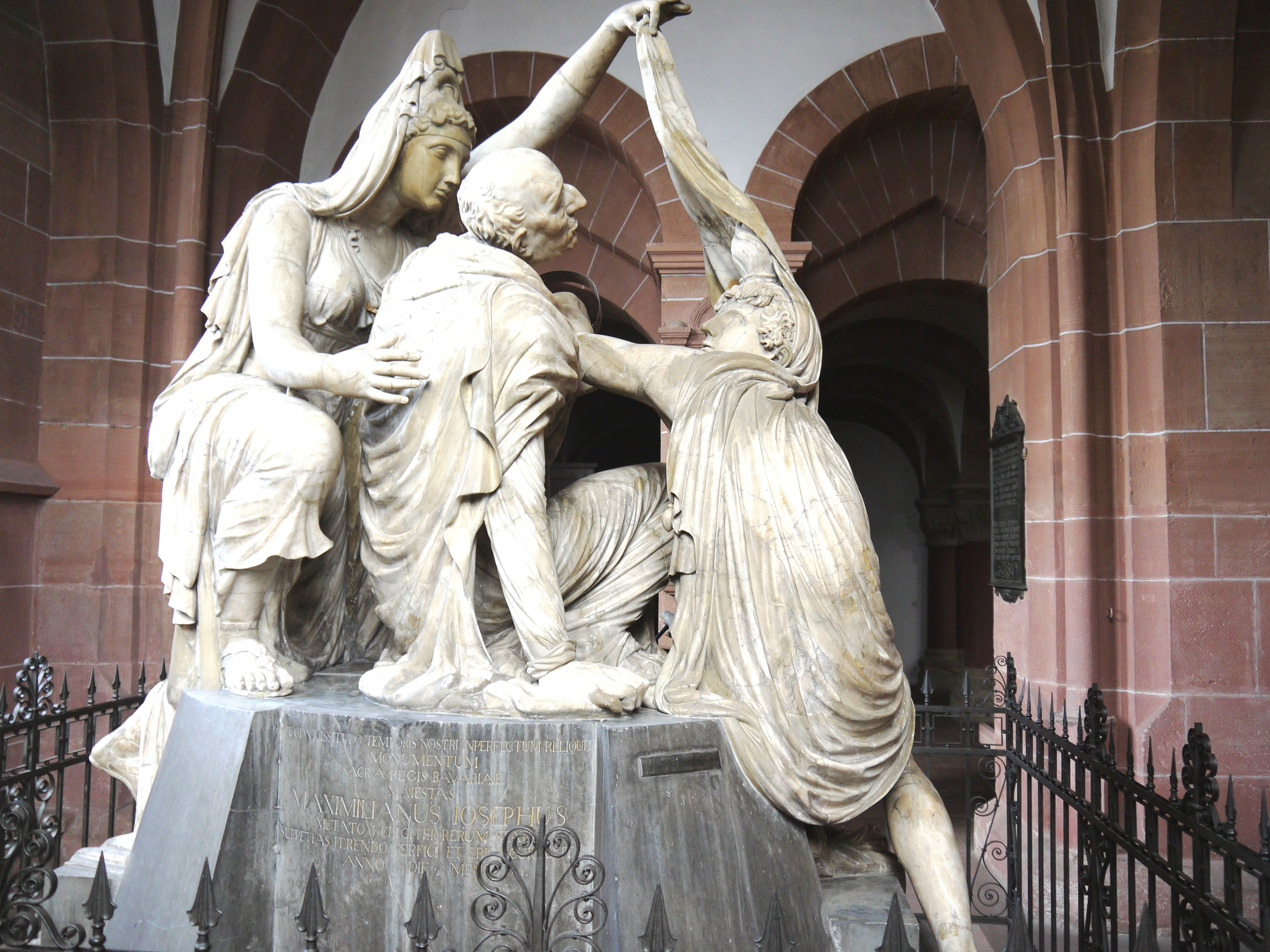
Tomb of Friedrich Karl Joseph von Erthal

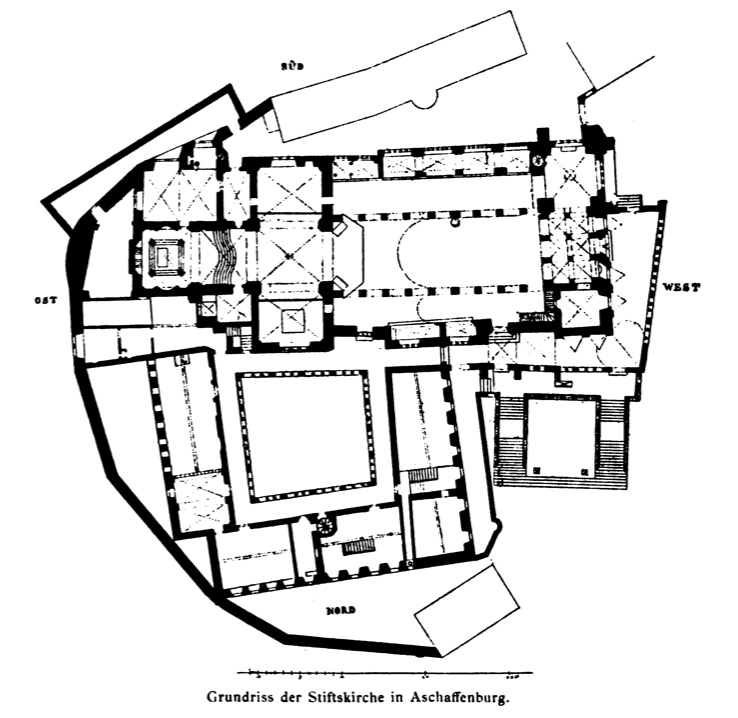
Floor plan

== See also ==
- Catholic Church in Germany
- St. Peter's Basilica
- List of the provosts (German)
