= Temnora bouyeri =

Scientific classification
- Kingdom: Animalia
- Phylum: Arthropoda
- Class: Insecta
- Order: Lepidoptera
- Family: Sphingidae
- Genus: Temnora
- Species: T. bouyeri

Binomial name
- Temnora bouyeri Cadiou, 2003

Species of moth

Temnora bouyeri is a moth of the family Sphingidae. It is endemic to the Democratic Republic of the Congo.
