= The Miracle of Our Lady of the Snows =

Painting by Mathias Grünewald

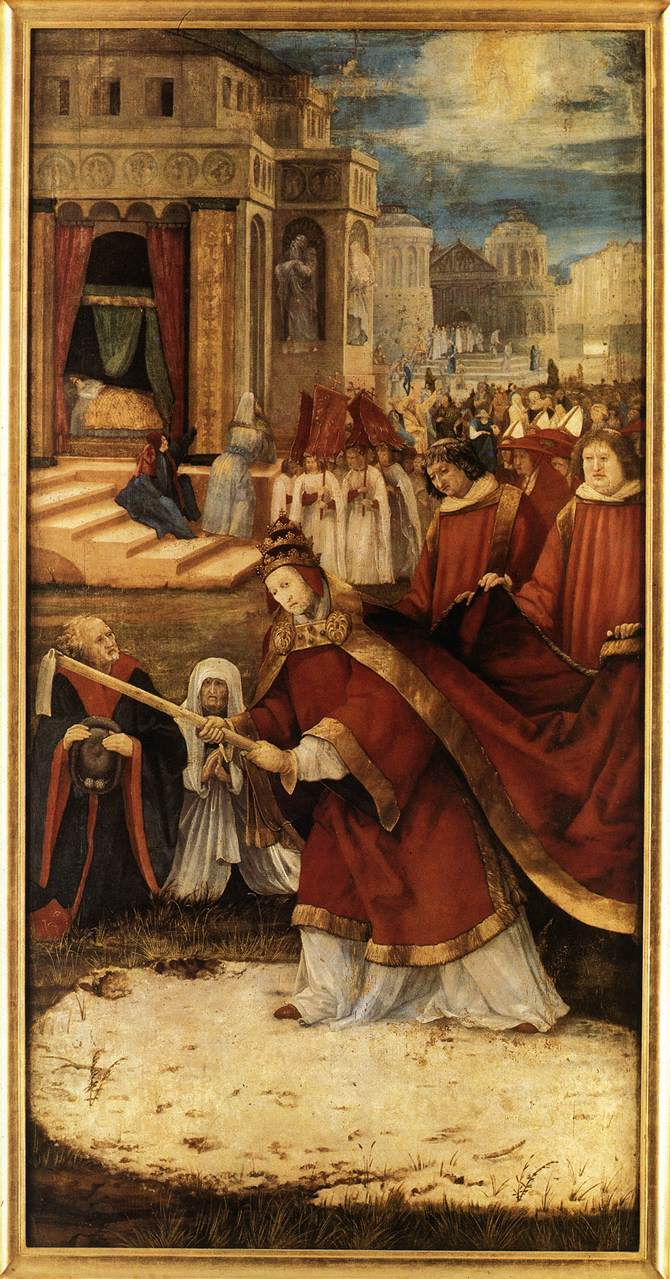
- Artist: Matthias Grünewald
- Year: 1517-1519
- Type: Oil on wood
- Dimensions: 176 cm × 88.5 cm (69 in × 34.8 in)
- Location: Augustiner Museum, Freiburg im Breisgau

The Miracle of Our Lady of the Snows is an oil on wood painting by German artist Matthias Grünewald, created in 1517–1519, originally intended for the collegiate church in Aschaffenburg. It is held at the Augustiner Museum, in Freiburg im Breisgau, since 1904.

== History and description ==
Grünewald's painting was the right wing of the Altar of Our Lady of the Snows in the collegiate church in Aschaffenburg. In an unknown date, the work was sent to Bad Mergentheim, and in the original place only the original frames with the artist's signature and the date of 1519 remained. The middle part was a representation of the Madonna with the Child. In 1809 this part was purchased by the parish priest from Stuppach. Since then, it is known as the Stuppach Madonna. The right part was purchased in 1828 by the Bavarian Central Picture Gallery, which in 1852 sold it for 15 guilders and 36 cutters. In the following years, the work changed hands until it was transferred to the Augustinermuseum in Freiburg im Breisgau, in 1904.

The Miracle of Our Lady of the Snows represents the legendary origins of the Roman Basilica of Santa Maria Maggiore. One night, Pope Liberius and one of the Roman patricians had an identical dream in which Our Lady ordered a church to be erected in a place where snow would fall in the middle of Summer. The next day, the Esquilin hill was covered with snow. On the left side of Grünewald's painting it is depicted the papal palace with the sleeping pope. The patrician and his wife are sitting on the stairs looking at the sky where the Virgin Mary appears. On the right side, the faithful and clergy are going to the site of the miracle. In the foreground, the Pope is depicted, using a hoe to mark the location of the cornerstone for the construction of the temple. The patrician and his wife are kneeling nearby. The man has the face of Grünewald.

== See also ==
- Dedication of the Basilica of Saint Mary Major (section Legend)
