= Cadiou =

Cadiou is a surname. Notable people with the surname include:

- Henri Cadiou (1906–1989), French painter and lithographer
- Jacques Cadiou (born 1943), French racing cyclist
- Noah Cadiou (born 1998), French footballer
