= Werner Schramm =

German painter

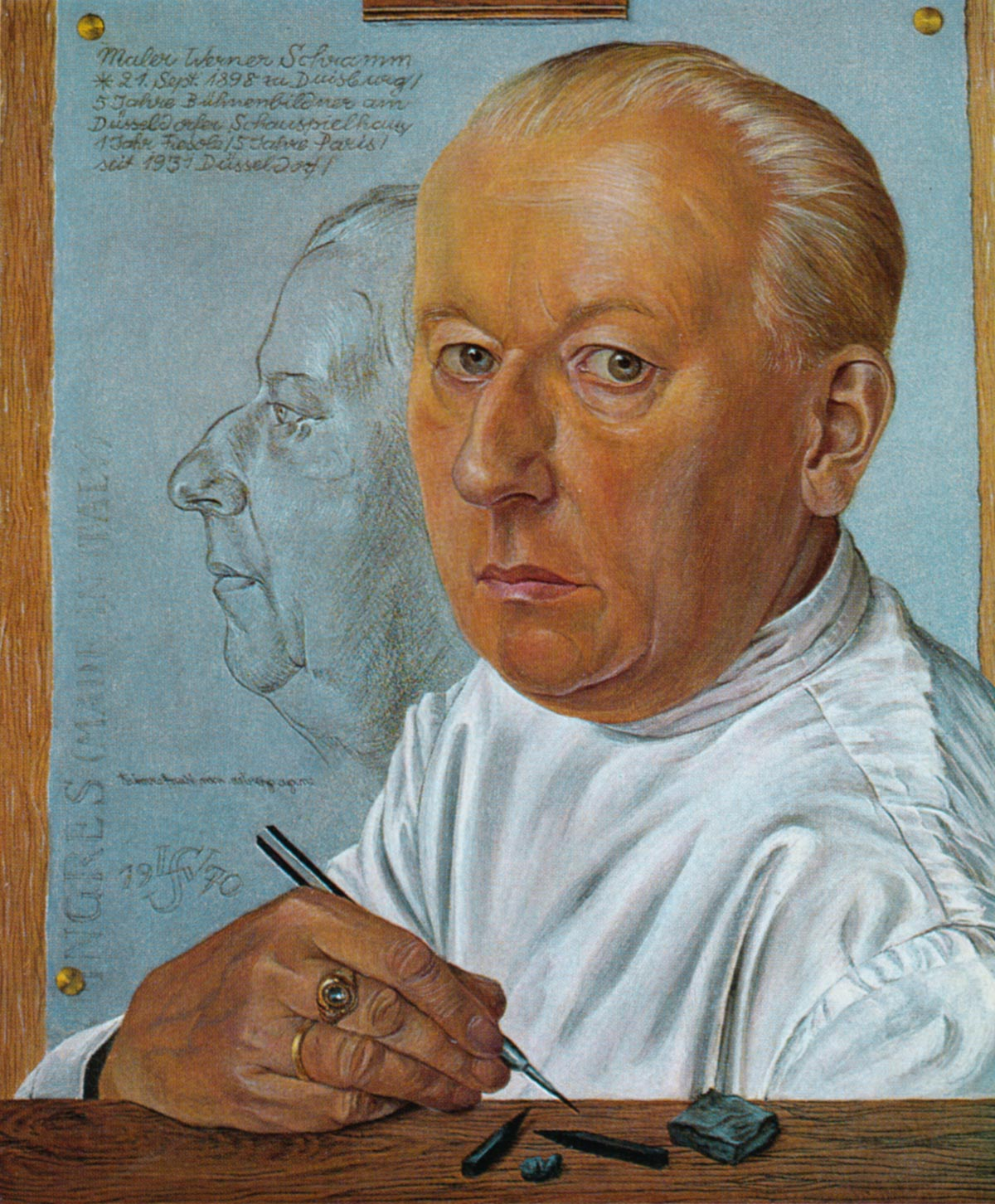
Self-portrait of Werner Schramm ("Selbstbildnis", 1970)

Werner Schramm (1898–1970) was a German painter. He was born as a son of merchants in Duisburg, Germany. After a classical education, he entered the School of Decorative Arts in Düsseldorf. In 1919 he began painting again after having been interrupted by the First World War. He was influenced by German Expressionism and also by the first expressions of abstract art. The discovery of the Isenheim Altarpiece of Matthias Grünewald, which was temporarily exhibited at the Munich Pinacothek, was a revelation to him and he started his first attempts in Renaissance techniques: a well-performed drawing on a priming of chalk or plaster with a mixture of oil and yolk of an egg as paint.

In 1920 he was appointed decorator at the theatre of Düsseldorf. After his marriage in 1925 to Liselotte Heckmann he lived for a year near Florence and then five years in Paris. During that time he journeyed many times across France. In 1929 he went to Spain. From 1931 he lived with his family in Düsseldorf, West Germany, where he died in 1970.

== Sources ==
- Werner Schramm, Liselotte Schramm-Heckmann, Otto Brües: Werner Schramm und Liselotte Schramm-Heckmann. Ratingen 1965, ASIN: B0000BNIBW
- Werner Schramm, Liselotte Schramm-Heckmann, Otto Brües: Werner Schramm und Liselotte Schramm-Heckmann (2nd edition). Ratingen 1976
- Liselotte Schramm-Heckmann: Werner Schramm, Liselotte Heckmann — Bühnenbilder und Figurinen 1920-1925. 1991, ISBN 978-3-929945-04-1
- Liselotte Schramm-Heckmann: Jugenderinnerungen in Bernd Braumüller: Draeger — Valette, Zwei Berliner Familien und Ihre Nachkommen. Rotenburg 2000
