= Henri Cadiou =

French painter

- Born: 26 March 1906; Paris, France
- Died: 6 April 1989; Paris, France
- Occupations: Painter, Lithographer
- Known for: Founder of the “Mouvement Trompe-l’œil/Réalité”
- Movement: Realism, Trompe-l’œil
- Website: www.henricadiou.com

Henri Cadiou (March 26, 1906, Paris – April 6, 1989) was a 20th-century French realist painter and lithographer, best known for his work in trompe-l'œil painting. His trompe-l'œil paintings feature large groups of everyday objects depicted in a realistic style. He was also a painter of genre scenes.

He is credited with being a founder, in 1949, of the Mouvement Trompe-l'œil-réalité, a group which originally called itself the "Peintres de la Réalité."

The paintings Cadiou exhibited at the Salon de Mai of 1960, Shower Curtain and Electoral Panel in particular, caused a stir in the artistic community. Formed already in 1949 as a general reaction against abstract art, the Mouvement Trompe-l'œil-réalité gained greater visibility as a result of this 1960 exhibition.

Recently there has been a resurgence of interest in the work of Cadiou, as well as other painters associated with the Mouvement Trompe-l'œil-réalité, as contemporary exhibitions in Europe, Asia, and North America have focused on these French painters along with other precursors to contemporary hyperrealism.

== Chronology ==
- March 26, 1906, Birth of Henri Cadiou in Paris.
- 1919 Lithographer pupil at the Estienne School which he had to leave after 6 months because of the death of his father.
- 1920 Training as an engraver on leather. Initiates himself with the drawing of ornament in the evening school.
- 1922 Works for a lithographer. Frequent visits to the Louvre.
- 1924 Life drawing during the evenings in the Froment school. Falls in love with Baudelaire.
- 1925 Military service in the Dragons in Colmar. Is fascinated by Grünewald
- 1927 Death of his mother. Becomes unemployed.
- 1928 Is interested in the history, sociology, and popular art. Works in advertising and decoration.
- 1934 charmed by seeing "Peintres de la Réalité" in the Musée de l’Orangerie in Paris.
- 1935 Rents a workshop close to the rue Mouffetard. The creation of the REGAIN group very influenced by Jean Giono. Gets married and moves to 65, Boulevard Arago (Cité Fleurie). He shows at the Montmorency Gallery (now Musée Hébert).
- 1936 Birth of his first son Alain.
- 1937 He shows landscapes of Brittany at the Charpentier Gallery. Exposure of the "popular Masters of the Reality" organized by Andy-Farcy, conservative of the Grenoble Museum with the assistance of Maximilien Gauthier.
- 1938 Birth of his second son Gilles, who paints under the pseudonym of Pierre Gilou.
- 1939 Is subjected to the enucleation of his left eye in October.
- 1941 March 15. Starts a school of Graphic arts, in Paris which will be then recognized by the State.
- 1943 First exposure: "Painting of Reality" by Cadiou with the Contemporary Gallery. Preface of Rene Méjean. The same year he organized with the Chardin Gallery the exhibition "Five Painters of Reality": Cadiou, Cottet, Jeannisson, Augustin, and Philippe Rouart.
- 1945 Birth of his daughter Anne-Marie.
- 1946 Is in charge of the "Friends of Art" and organizes debates. He paints The Child with the small flannel blanket which marks the beginning of what was called his “miserabilist period”, inspired by the after-war realistic cinema and which lasted ten years.
- May 1949 Peintres de la Réalité by Cadiou in the Carmine gallery.
- 1950 Exposure in the Bradtke Gallery (Luxembourg).
- 1951 Exposure in Belval Gallery, Nevers. He is refused by the “Salon d’Automne”.
- 1952 Joins the Salon des Artistes Indépendants in which he exhibits until the end of his life.
- 1955 Personal exposure in May in the Romanet gallery. Cofounder of the Salon "Comparaisons" of which he was Vice President until 1989. Organized with some friends sharing the same ideas on art, the International exhibition of the Painters of Reality in the Marforen gallery.
- 1958 Second International Exhibition of the Painters of Reality in Brussels.
- 1959 Edition of a book dedicated to Cadiou by Maximilien Gauthier (Flammarion. Edition). Edition of the book Painters of Reality in the 20th Century prefaced by Jean Giono.
- 1960 Exposure in Madrid.
- 1961 Beginning of the trompe-l'œil period with “Spatial Transcendence” which is the parody of a Fontana work. Following a disagreement with the administration, he is fired from the direction of the graphic arts school that he founded and is disciplinarily transferred to Brittany as the manager of a Maritime and aquicultural School.
- 1962 The group of the Painters of the Reality, which he created, exposes trompe-l'œil. To make known his ideas, he publishes a satirical review on art : Art snob
- 1963 Exposure of The shower.
- 1964 For the tenth birthday of “Comparisons”, he presents “L’étagère de cuisine”. The Painters of Reality group exposes a satire of contemporary art which they baptize "socio-experimental research"
- 1965 His “Panneau électoral” present in a humorous form a proclamation of the movement that he intends to promote.
- 1966 Realization of “La femme invisible” and “La cabine d’essayage”.
- 1967 Summer stays in Villeneuvette (south of France) where join the Painters of Reality and their friends in an industrious and friendly environment.
- 1969 Paints the Homage to Marcel Duchamp who represents a trompe-l'œil urinal
- 1970 Beginning of the combat for the safeguard of the “Cité Fleurie”. His pictorial production during ten years will be considerably reduced.
- 1972 Paints La Palisade in which it cannot be prevented from letting show through its concerns for the safeguard of the Cité Fleurie.
- 1974 Paints the Fleuriste du métro Glacière which points out the attack of the “Cité fleurie” by the property developers.
- 1981 Paints his most famous painting: La déchirure.
- 1983 Exit of the book Cadiou trompe-l'œil published by Seth Eastman Moebs.
- 1989 With Gilou, he carries out a teaching work: “Painting of trompe-l'œil” (Dessain and Tolra). On April 6, he dies after having painted and written his newspaper like most days of his life.

== See also ==
- Henri Cadiou (French Wikipedia)
- Pierre Gilou (French Wikipedia)
- Œuvres de Pierre Gilou
- Joel Cadiou, grandson of Henri Cadiou
- Henri Cadiou (official website)
