= Liselotte Schramm-Heckmann =

German painter

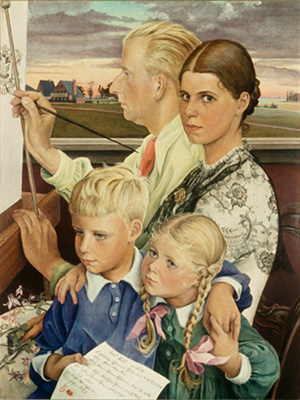
Self-portrait of Liselotte Schramm-Heckmann with her family ("Selbstbildnis mit Familie", 1935)

Liselotte Schramm-Heckmann (born 1904 in Duisburg, Germany; died 1995 in Erkrath, Germany) was a German painter. She was born in Duisburg as the daughter of an old family of merchants. An ancestor on her father's side was a draughtsman at the court of the Tsar in Moscow. Directly after secondary education she followed painting classes. Although she was influenced by expressionism and abstract art, her admiration for the old masters let her concentrate on realistic art. A long journey in Italy confirmed her opinion. She has painted many landscapes and children's portraits.

Besides painting, she created sceneries for many plays and operas for some stages in western Germany.

After her marriage with the painter Werner Schramm in 1925, she lived at Fiesole near Florence and worked there for a year. The young couple then lived for five years at Bellevue near Paris. There, a son and a daughter were born. Returning to Germany, they settled for good in Düsseldorf.

In 1938 she organized a big exhibition of her works in several towns of the Rhineland.

In 1955 she contributed to the first International Exhibition of the Peintres de la réalité in Paris.
