= Stuppach Madonna =

Painting of the Madonna and Child by Matthias Grünewald

Coordinates: 49°26′37″N 9°44′56″E

The Stuppach Madonna
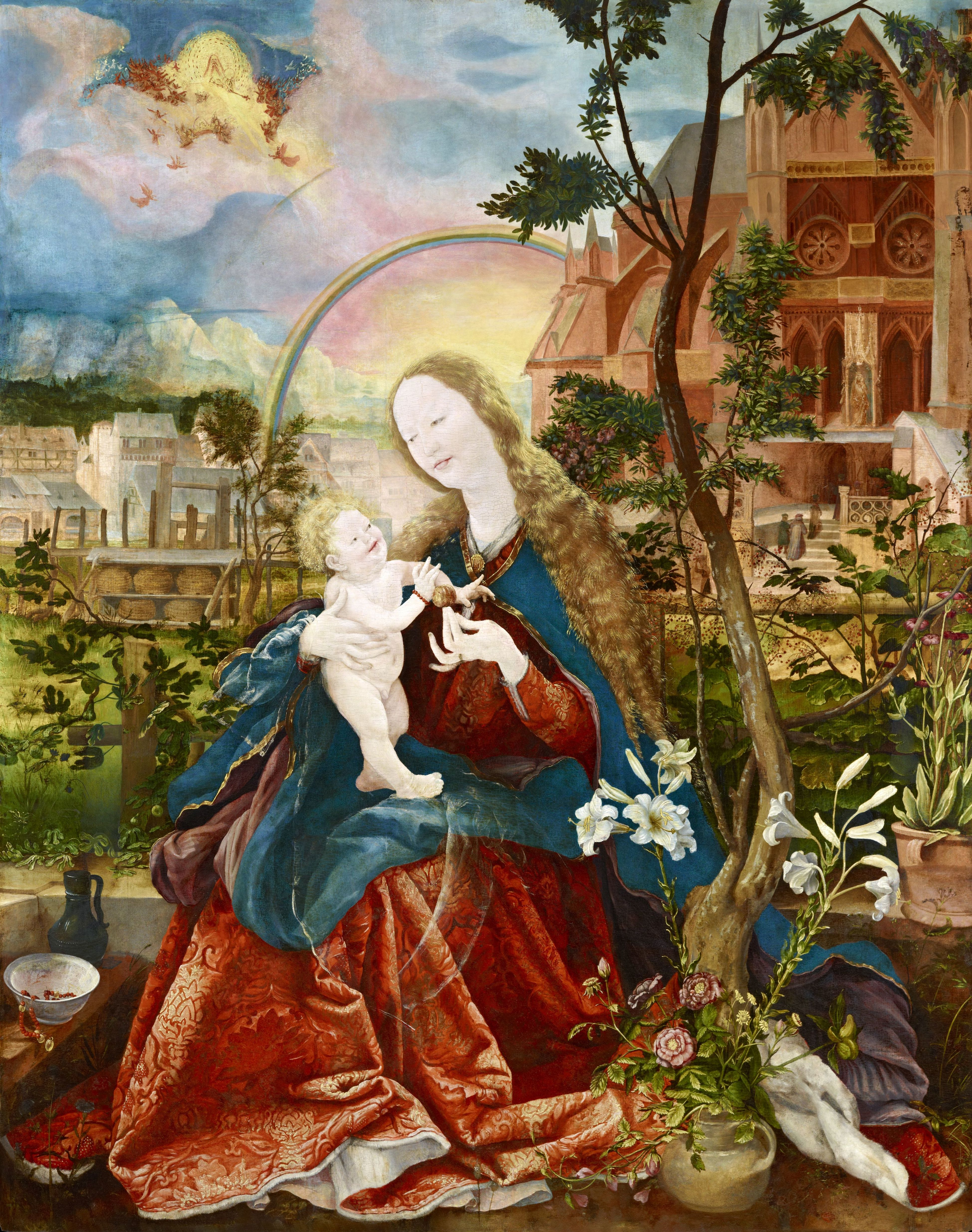
- Artist: Matthias Grünewald
- Year: 1514 - 1519
- Type: Mixed media on wood
- Dimensions: 186 cm × 150 cm (73 in × 59 in)
- Location: Parish Church of the Coronation of the Virgin, Bad Mergentheim

The Stuppach Madonna (German: Stuppacher Madonna) is a 1514–1519 painting of the Madonna and Child by the German Renaissance painter Matthias Grünewald. It is located today in the Parish Church of the Coronation of the Virgin (Pfarrkirche Mariä Krönung) in Stuppach (Bad Mergentheim). Along with the Isenheim Altarpiece, it is considered one of Grünewald's main works.

== Bibliography ==
- Brigitte Barz: Die Stuppacher Madonna. Urachhaus, Stuttgart 1998. ISBN 3-8251-7193-0
- Tilman Daiber: Die "Stuppacher Madonna" von Matthias Grünewald. Untersuchung zur Maltechnik. Hochschulschrift. Akad. der Bildenden Künste, Stuttgart 1999.
- Werner Groß (Ed.): Die Stuppacher Madonna zu Gast im Diözesanmuseum Rottenburg. Süddeutscher Verlag, Ulm 1999. ISBN 3-88294-280-0
- Elsbeth Wiemann: Die Stuppacher Madonna. Exhibit catalog. Staatsgalerie Stuttgart 1998.
- Lieb, teuer und nicht zu kriegen. Grünewald-Schau in Bayern - Auch die Stuppacher Madonna kommt nicht. in: Sonntagsblatt. Evangelische Wochenzeitung für Bayern. 11. August 2002.
- Bruno Hilsenbeck: Die Stuppacher Madonna und ihre Botschaft. Kapellenpflege Stuppacher Madonna in Stuppach-Bad Mergentheim
