= Matthias Grünewald =

German Renaissance painter (c.1470–1528)

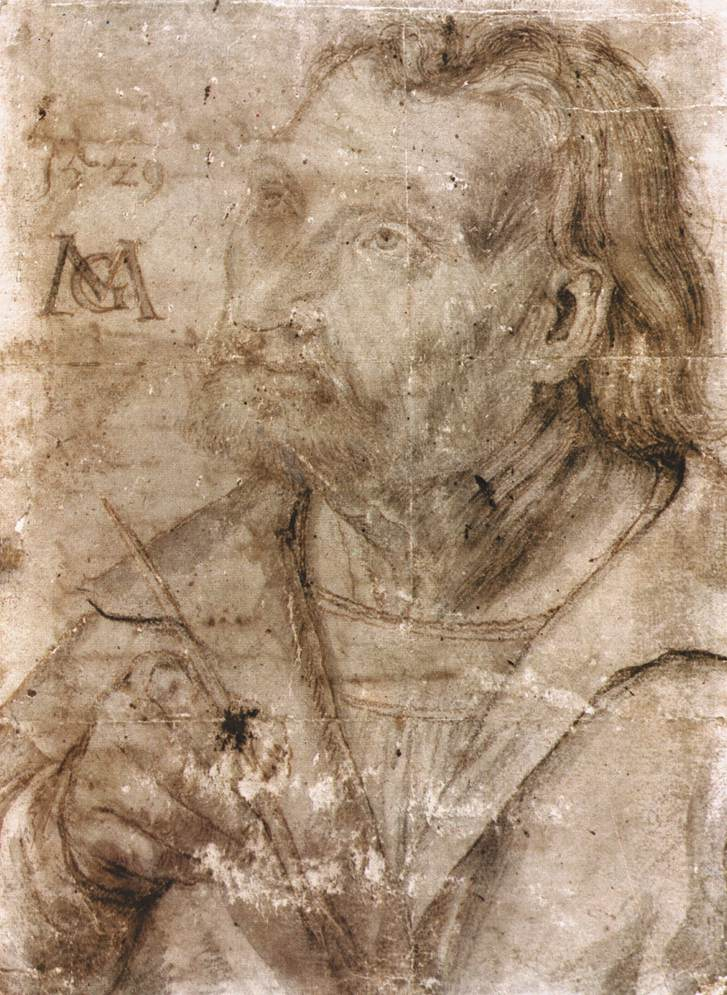
Grünewald's John the Evangelist. This work was long thought to be a self-portrait.

Matthias Grünewald (c. 1470 – 31 August 1528; also known as Mathis Gothart Nithart) was a German Renaissance painter of religious works who ignored Renaissance classicism to continue the style of late medieval Central European art into the 16th century.

Only ten paintings—including several polyptychs—and thirty-five drawings survive, all religious, although many others were lost at sea on their way to Sweden as war booty. He was obscure until the late nineteenth century, when many of his paintings were attributed to Albrecht Dürer, who is now seen as his stylistic antithesis. His largest and most famous work is the Isenheim Altarpiece created c. 1512 to 1516.

== Life ==
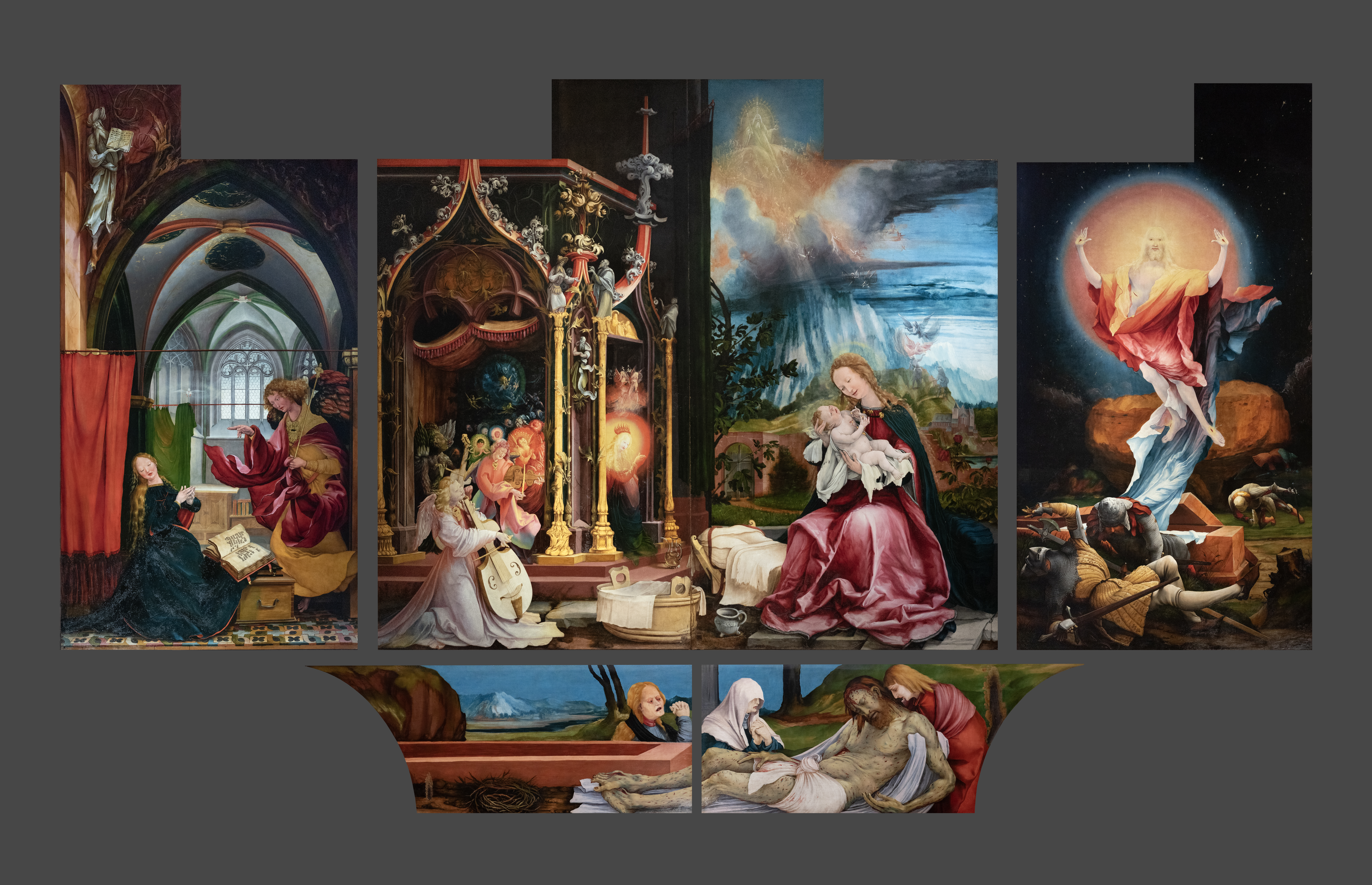
Second state of the Isenheim Altarpiece, Colmar, Unterlinden Museum

He was recognised in his lifetime, as shown by his commissions, yet the details of his life are unusually unclear for a painter of his significance at this date. The first source to sketch his biography comes from the German art historian Joachim von Sandrart, who describes him around 1505 working on the exterior decoration of an altarpiece by Albrecht Dürer in Frankfurt. As this work is typically performed by apprentices, it was estimated that he was born in 1475. Sandrart records that Grünewald's apprentice was the painter Hans Grimmer, who became famous in his time, but most of whose works were lost in the Thirty Years' War. Sandrart describes Grünewald as leading a withdrawn and melancholy life, and marrying unhappily.

More recent investigations have provided further information on Grünewald's life. In 1511 he became court artist of Uriel von Gemmingen, Archbishop of Mainz, and he also worked for the next archbishop, Albert of Brandenburg. About 1510 he received a commission from the Frankfurt merchant Jacob Heller and settled in nearby Frankfurt where records indicate he bought a house and married Anna, a converted Jew, then probably aged 18. The marriage was not happy and in 1523 she was institutionalised with what is variously described as mental illness and demonic possession.

From 1512 to 1514 or 1515 he worked on the Isenheim altarpiece, apparently in partnership with another Mathis, variously surnamed Nithart, Neithart, von Würzburg (after his place of birth), or Gothardt. Grünewald seems to have left Isenheim in a hurry, returning to Frankfurt, and his subsequent poverty suggests he was not fully paid for the altarpiece. In 1527 he entered the services of the wealthy and noble von Erbach family, apparently with a child (whether his own or adopted, is unclear). He most probably died in 1532, although sources vary.

There has been considerable uncertainty about the details of his life. In 1938 Walter Karl Zülch published the theory that Grünewald and his partner Nithart/Gothardt were the same person; this Nithart/Gothardt was a painter, engineer, and "water artist" born in Würzburg in the 1460s or maybe 1470s and probably dying in 1528. This theory is now generally discredited, although more recent historians believe Nithart/Gothardt may have pretended to be Grünewald for business reasons.

== Works ==
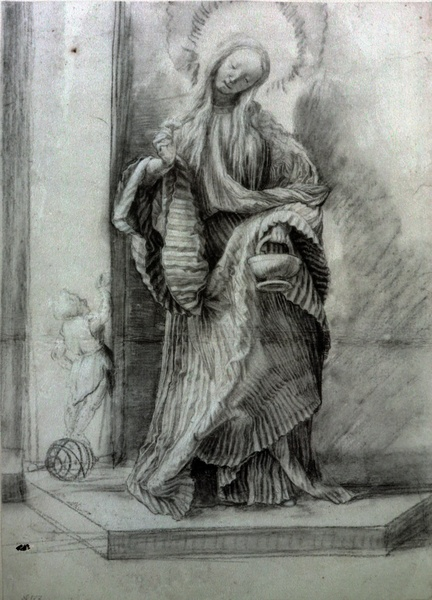
Sketch for a lost Saint Dorothy (Berlin). The J. Paul Getty Museum purchased a forged painting based on this drawing.

Only religious works are included in his small surviving corpus, the most famous being the Isenheim Altarpiece, completed 1515, now in the Musée d'Unterlinden, Colmar. Its nine images on twelve panels are arranged on double wings to present three views (rather than just the open and closed states of triptych altarpieces), according to the season or occasion. The first view with the outer wings closed shows a Crucifixion flanked by Saint Sebastien and Saint Anthony, with a predella showing the entombment. When the first set of wings is opened, the Annunciation, Angelic Concert (sometimes interpreted as the Birth of Ecclesia) Mary bathing Christ, and Resurrection are displayed. The third view discloses a carved and gilded wood altarpiece by Nikolaus Hagenauer, flanked by the Temptation of St. Anthony and Anthony's visit to Saint Paul. As well as being by far his greatest surviving work, the altarpiece contains most of his surviving painting by surface area, being 2.65 metres high and over 5 metres wide at its fullest extent.

His other works are in Germany, except for a small Crucifixion in Washington and another in Basel, Switzerland. Around 1510 he was asked to paint four saints in grisaille for the outside of the wings of Albrecht Dürer's Heller Altarpiece in Frankfurt. Dürer's work was destroyed by fire and survives only in copies, but the wings have survived, one pair of saints being displayed in Frankfurt's Municipal Art Gallery and the other in Karlsruhe's, Staatliche Kunsthalle. There are also the late Tauberbischofsheim altarpiece in the Staatliche Kunsthalle Karlsruhe, and the Establishment of the Santa Maria Maggiore in Rome (1517–1519), Augustiner Museum, Freiburg. A large panel of Saint Erasmus and Saint Maurice in Munich probably dates from 1521 to 1524, and was apparently part of a larger altarpiece project, the rest of which has not survived. Other works are in Munich, Karlsruhe, Aschaffenburg and Stuppach (:de). Altogether four somber and awe-filled Crucifixions survive. The visionary character of his work, with its expressive colour and line, is in stark contrast to Dürer's works. His paintings are known for their dramatic forms, vivid colors, and depiction of light.

== Reputation ==
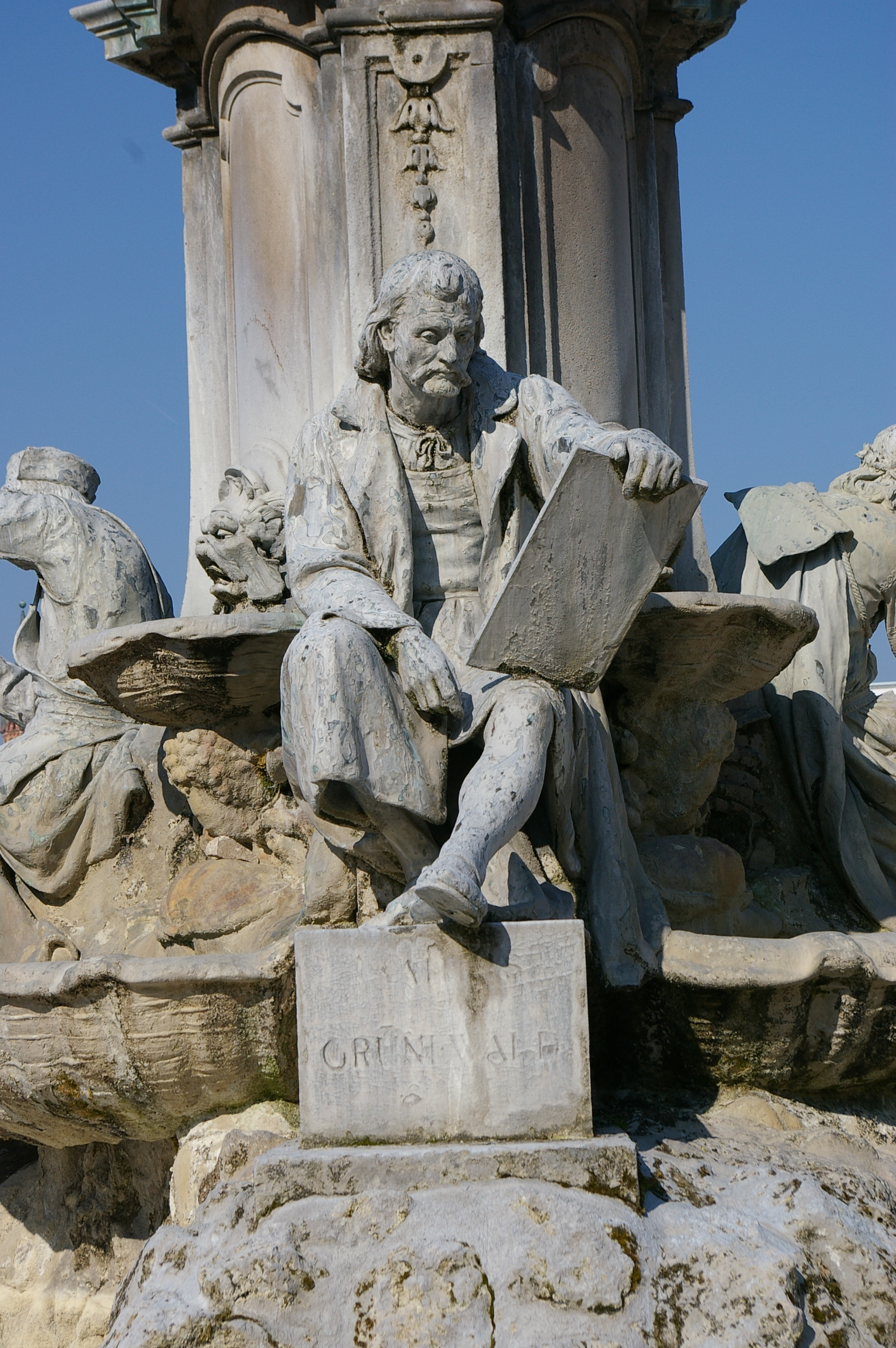
Grünewald in a 19th-century depiction on the Frankoniabrunnen, by Ferdinand von Miller (1824), now in front of the Würzburg Residence

The Lutheran theologian Philipp Melanchthon is one of the few contemporary writers to refer to Grünewald, who is rather puzzlingly described as "moderate" in style, when compared with Dürer and Cranach; what paintings this judgement is based on is uncertain. By the end of the century, when the Holy Roman Emperor, Rudolph II, embarked on his quest to secure as many Dürer paintings as possible, the Isenheim Altarpiece was already generally believed to be a Dürer.

In the late 19th century he was rediscovered, and became something of a cult figure, with the angst-laden expressionism—and absence of any direct classicism—of the Isenheim Altarpiece appealing to both German Nationalists and Modernists. Joris-Karl Huysmans promoted his art enthusiastically in both novels and journalism, rather as Proust did that of Vermeer. His apparent sympathies with the peasants in the Peasants' War also brought him admiration from the political left.

The composer Paul Hindemith based his 1938 opera Mathis der Maler on the life of Grünewald during the German Peasants' War; scene Six includes a partial re-enactment of some scenes from the Isenheim Altarpiece.

Elias Canetti wrote his novel Auto-da-Fé surrounded by reproductions of the Isenheim altarpiece stuck to the wall.

German author W. G. Sebald traces the life story of Grünewald in his first literary work, After Nature. This book-length prose-poem uses the preoccupations of Grünewald and especially his creation of the Isenheim Altarpiece to communicate an intensely apocalyptic vision of a world that has abandoned nature. The Isenheim Altarpiece also features in the last chapter of Sebald's novel The Emigrants, in which the painter Max Ferber describes his intuition of the extreme power of pain after seeing Grünewald's work.

=== Veneration ===
He is commemorated as an artist and saint by the Lutheran Church on April 6, along with Dürer and Cranach.

== Gallery ==
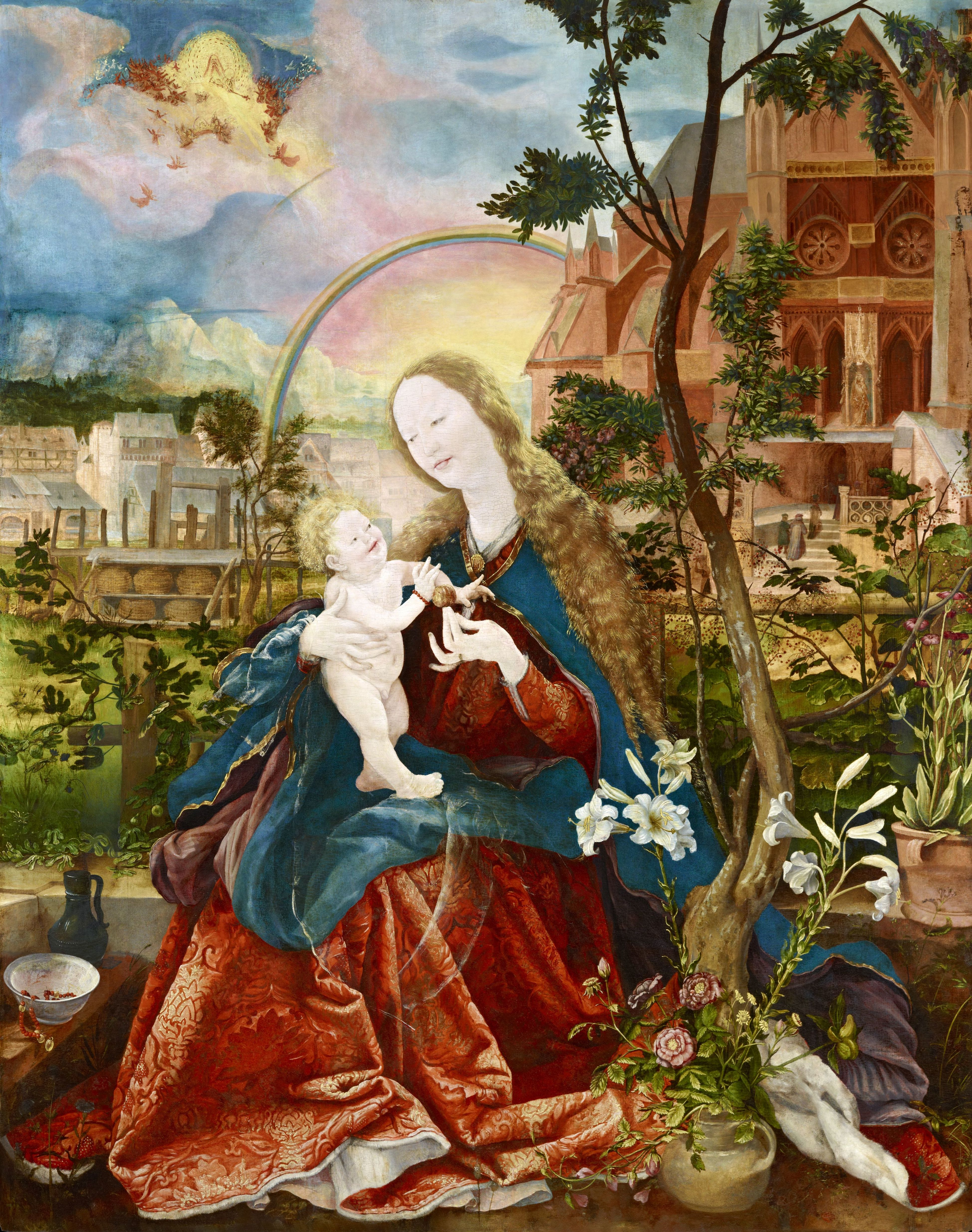
The Stuppach Madonna, 1514–1519.

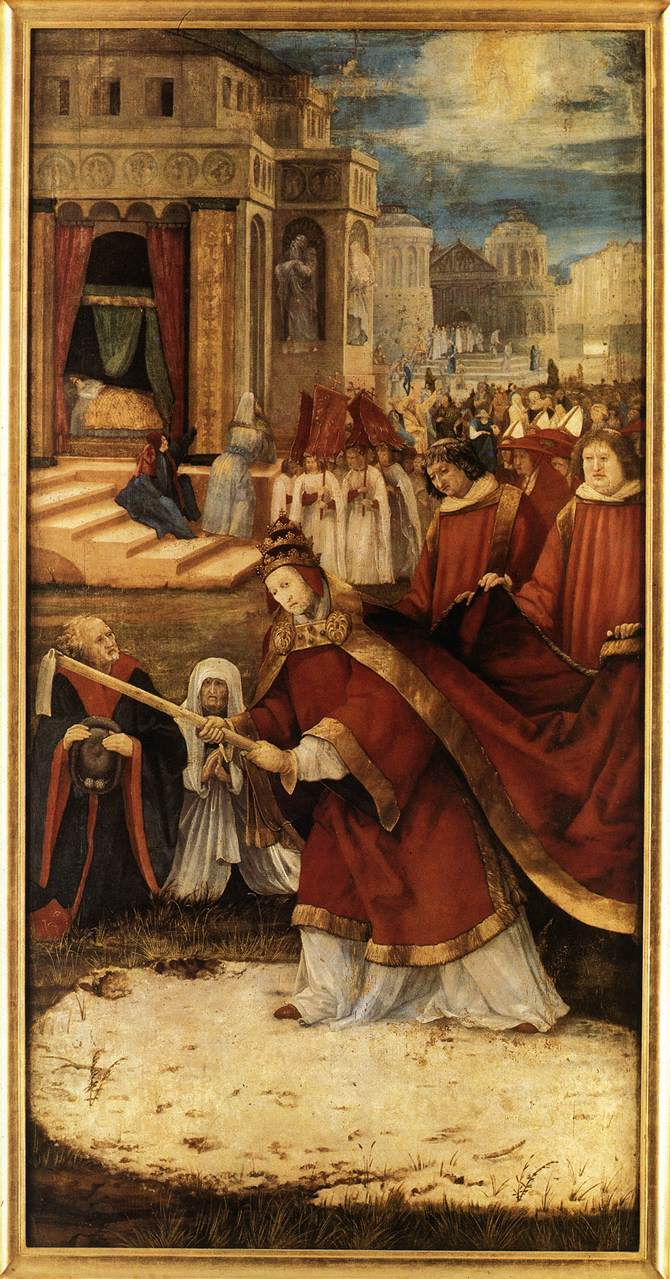
The Miracle of Our Lady of the Snows, 1517-1519

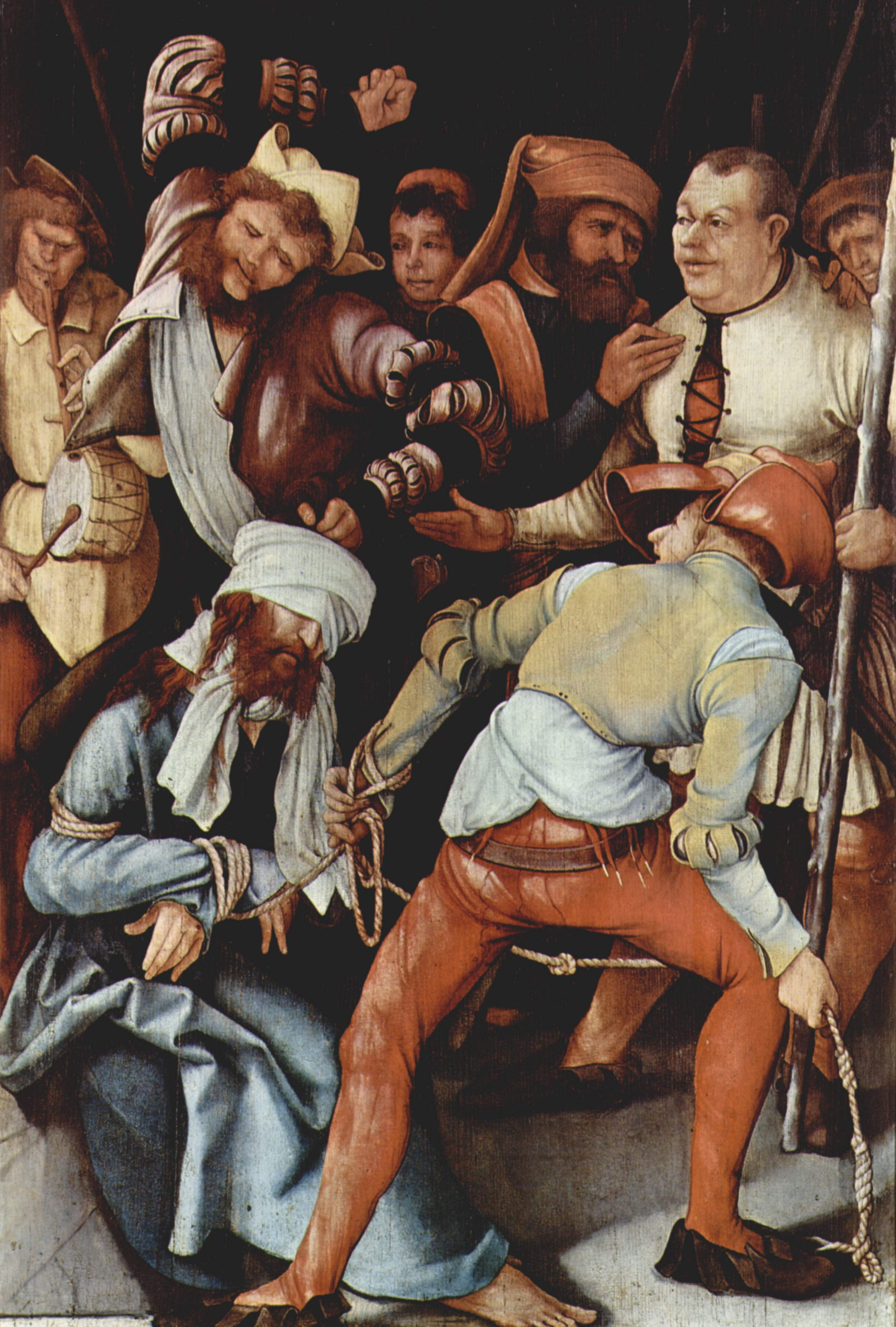
The Mocking of Christ, c. 1503

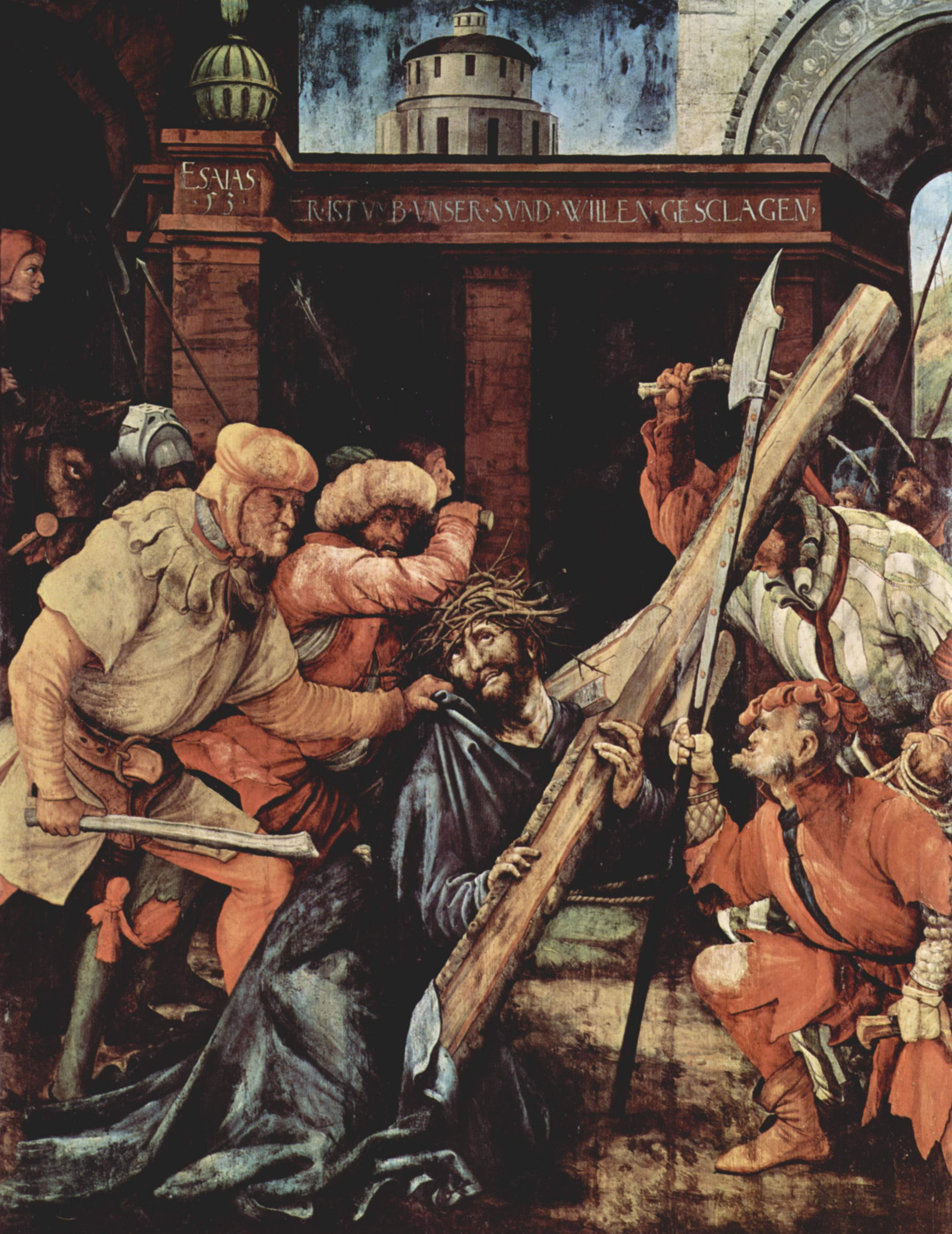
Christ Bearing the Cross, 1523–1525 (originally on one side of the panel that is known as the Tauberbischofsheim altarpiece, Kunsthalle Karlsruhe)

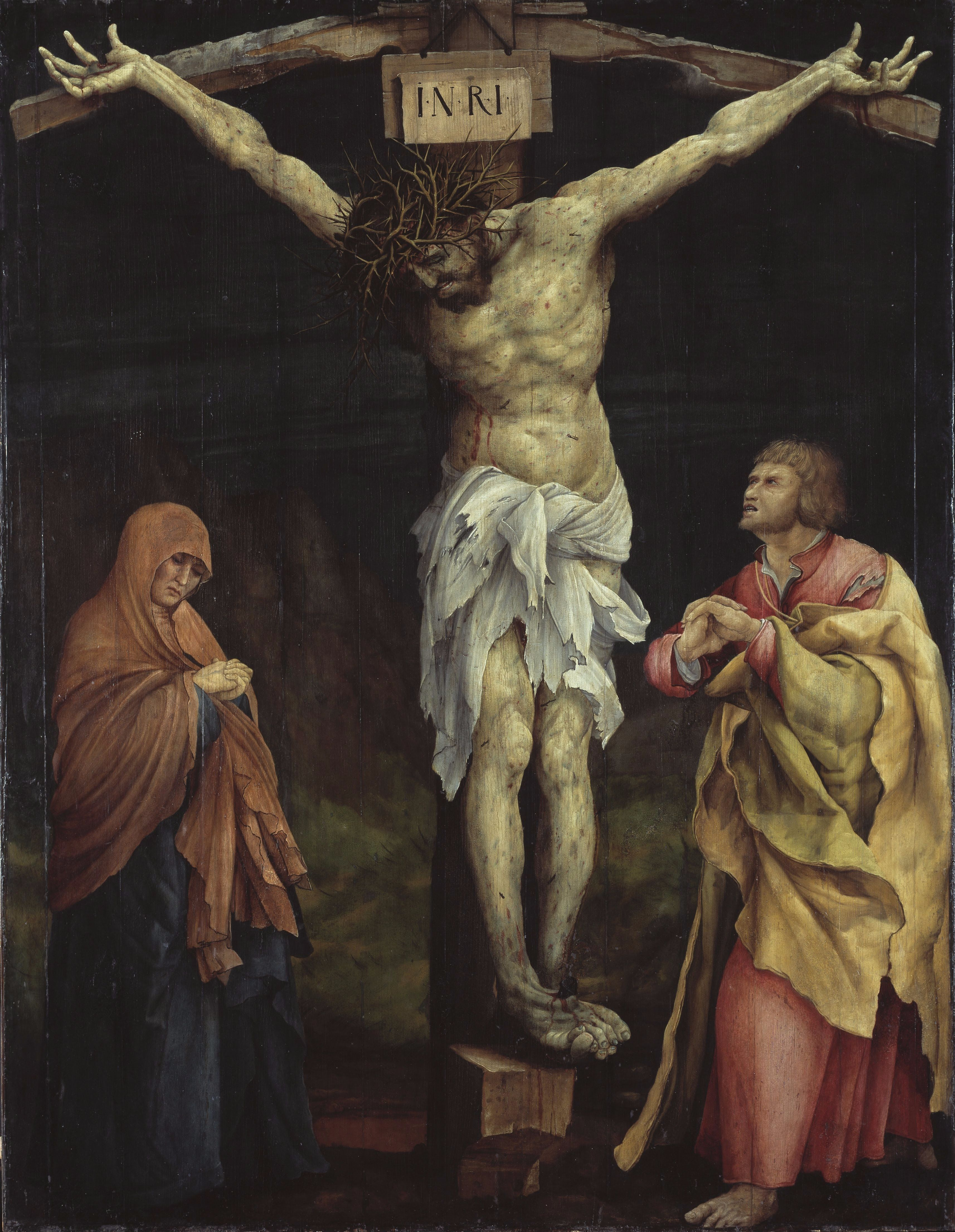
Large Crucifixion, 1523–1525 (originally on the other side of the panel known as the Tauberbischofsheim altarpiece)

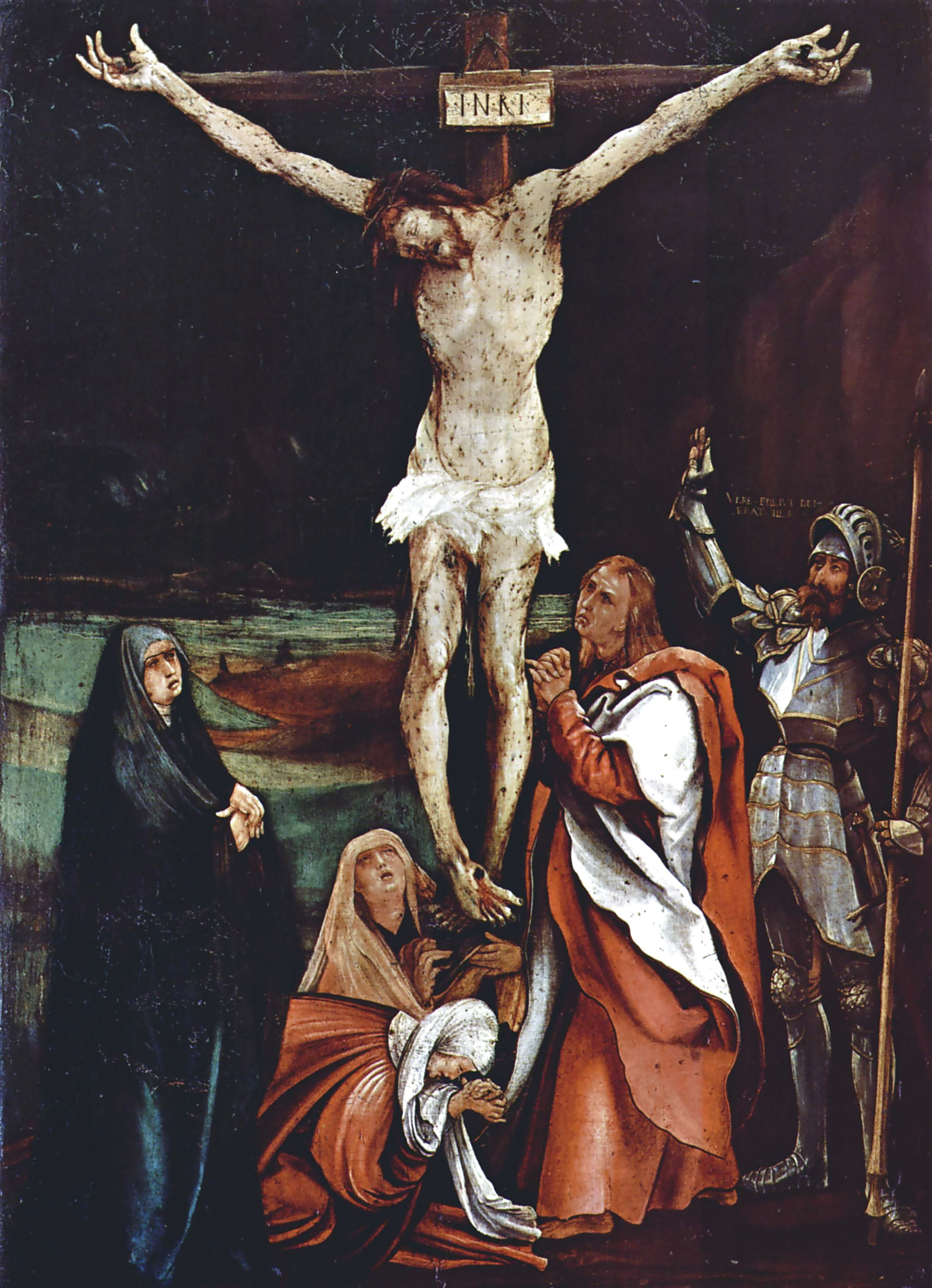
Crucifixion in the Kunstmuseum Basel.

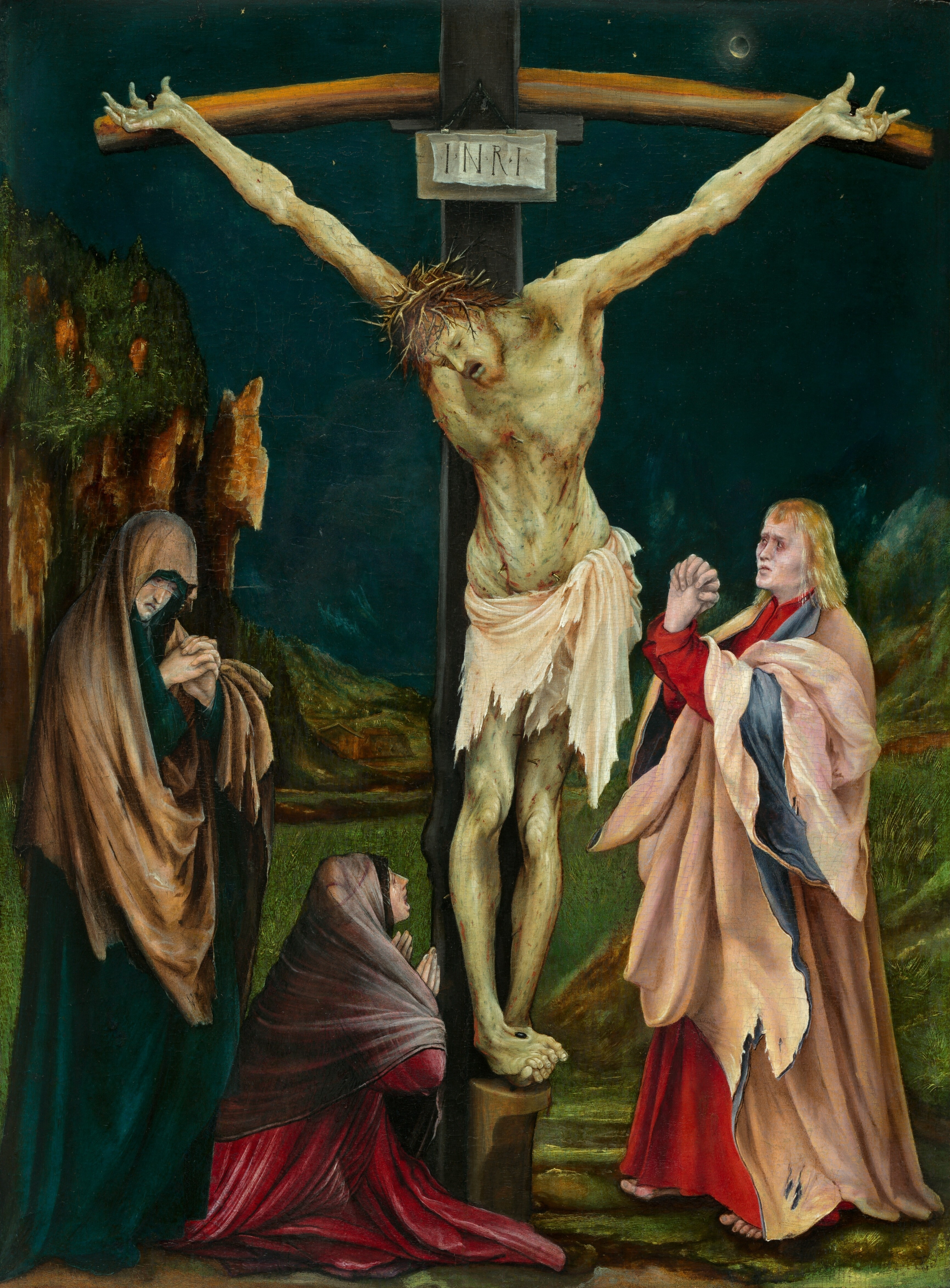
Crucifixion in the National Gallery of Art, Washington.

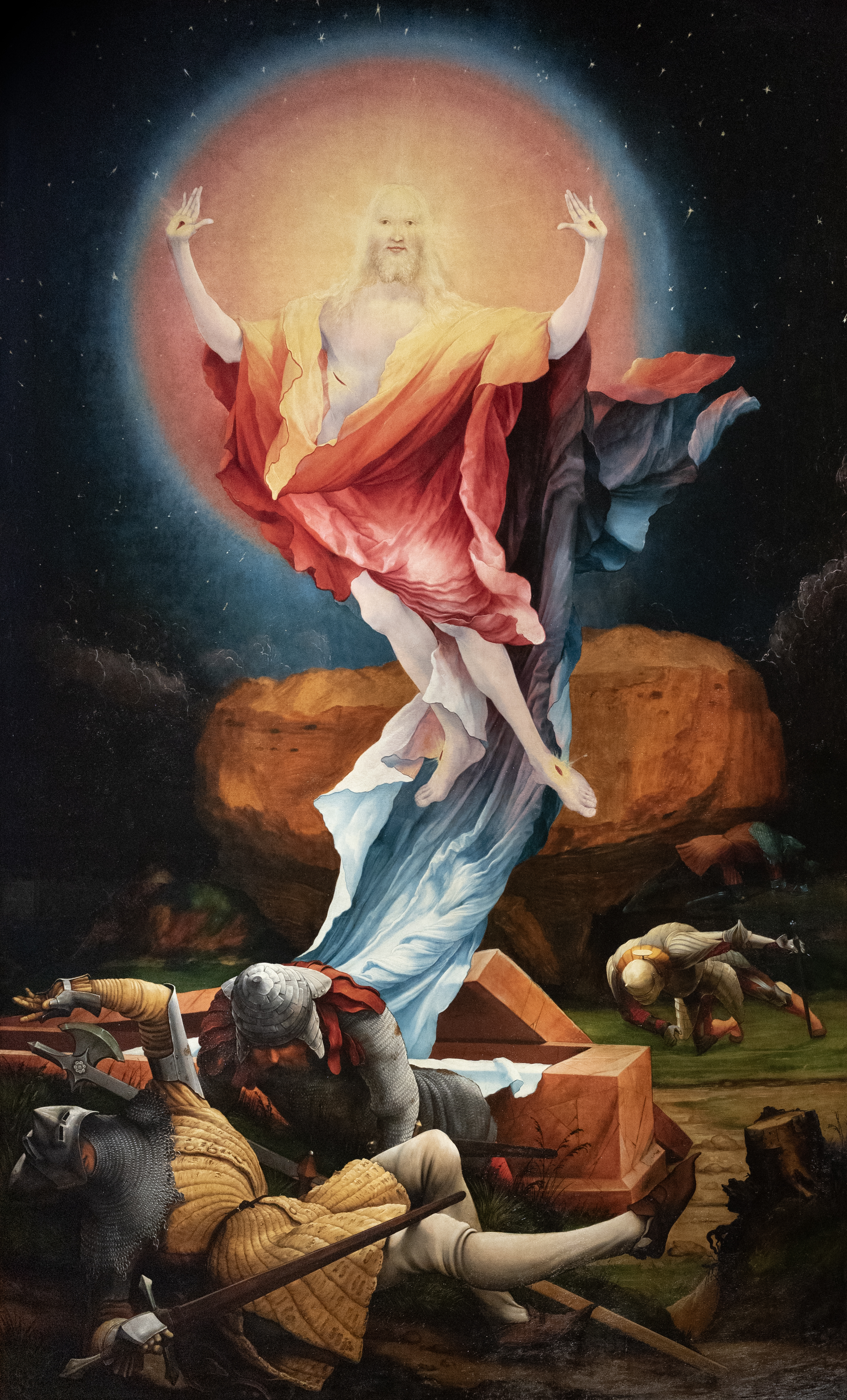
Resurrection

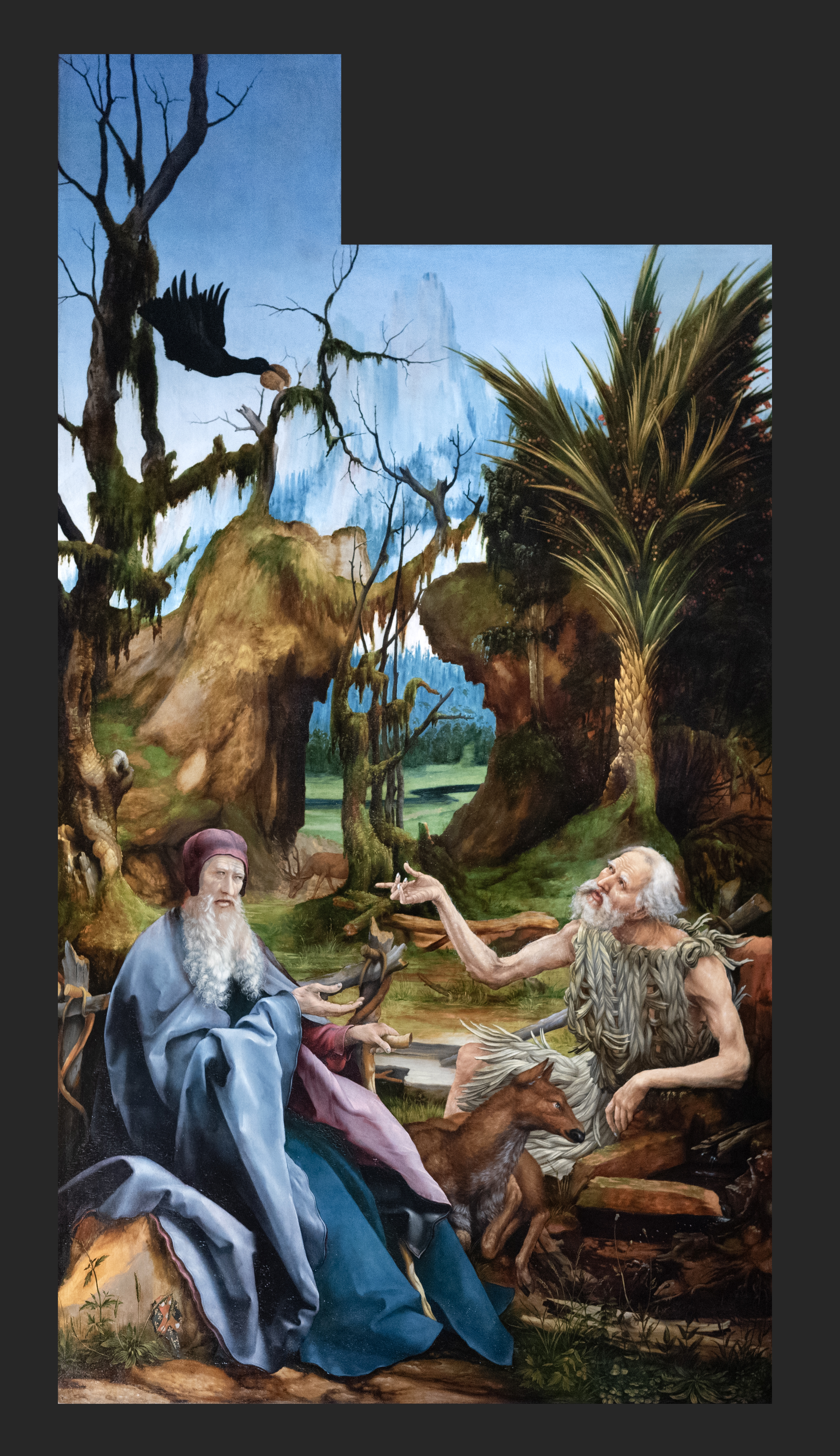

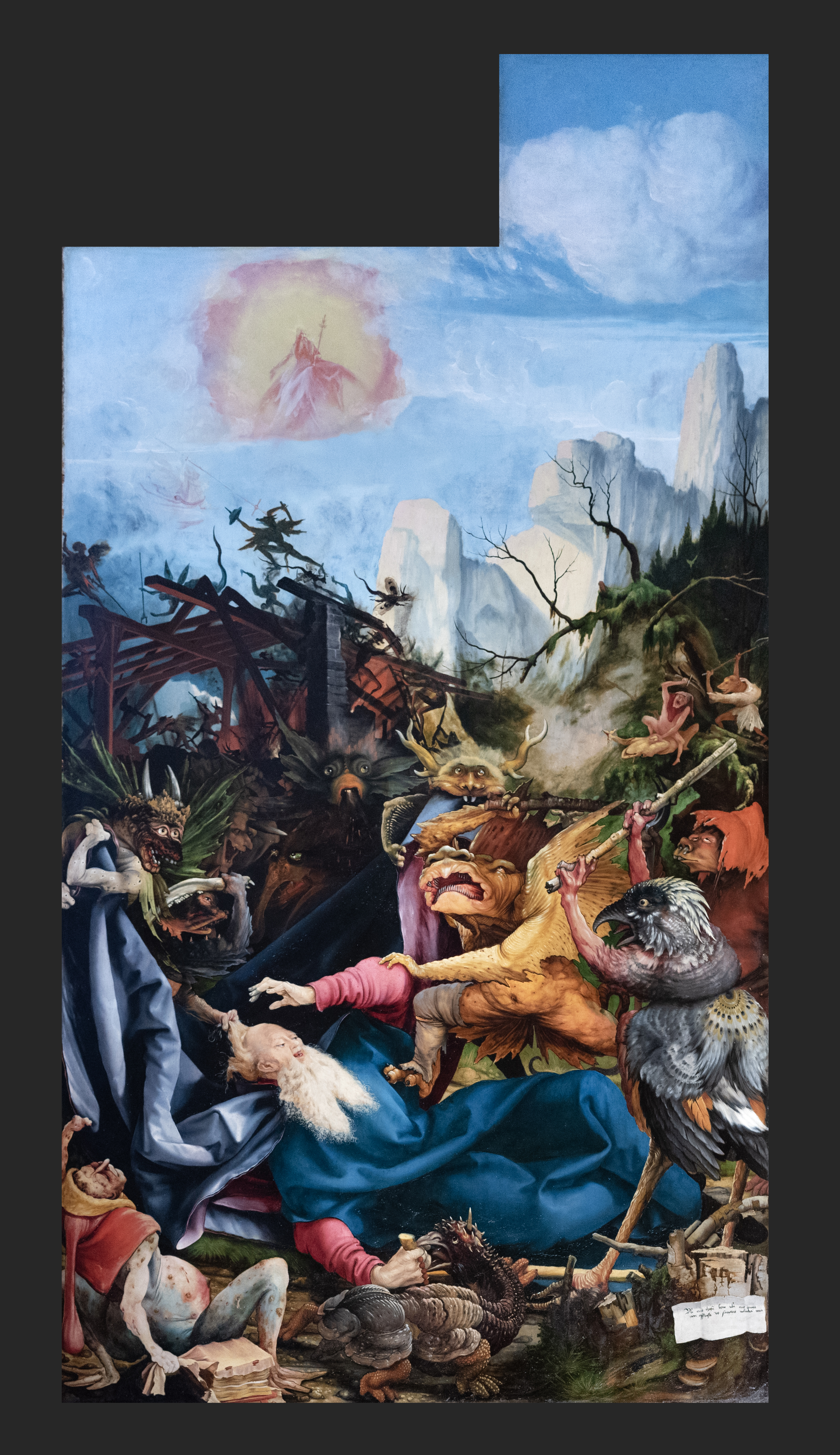

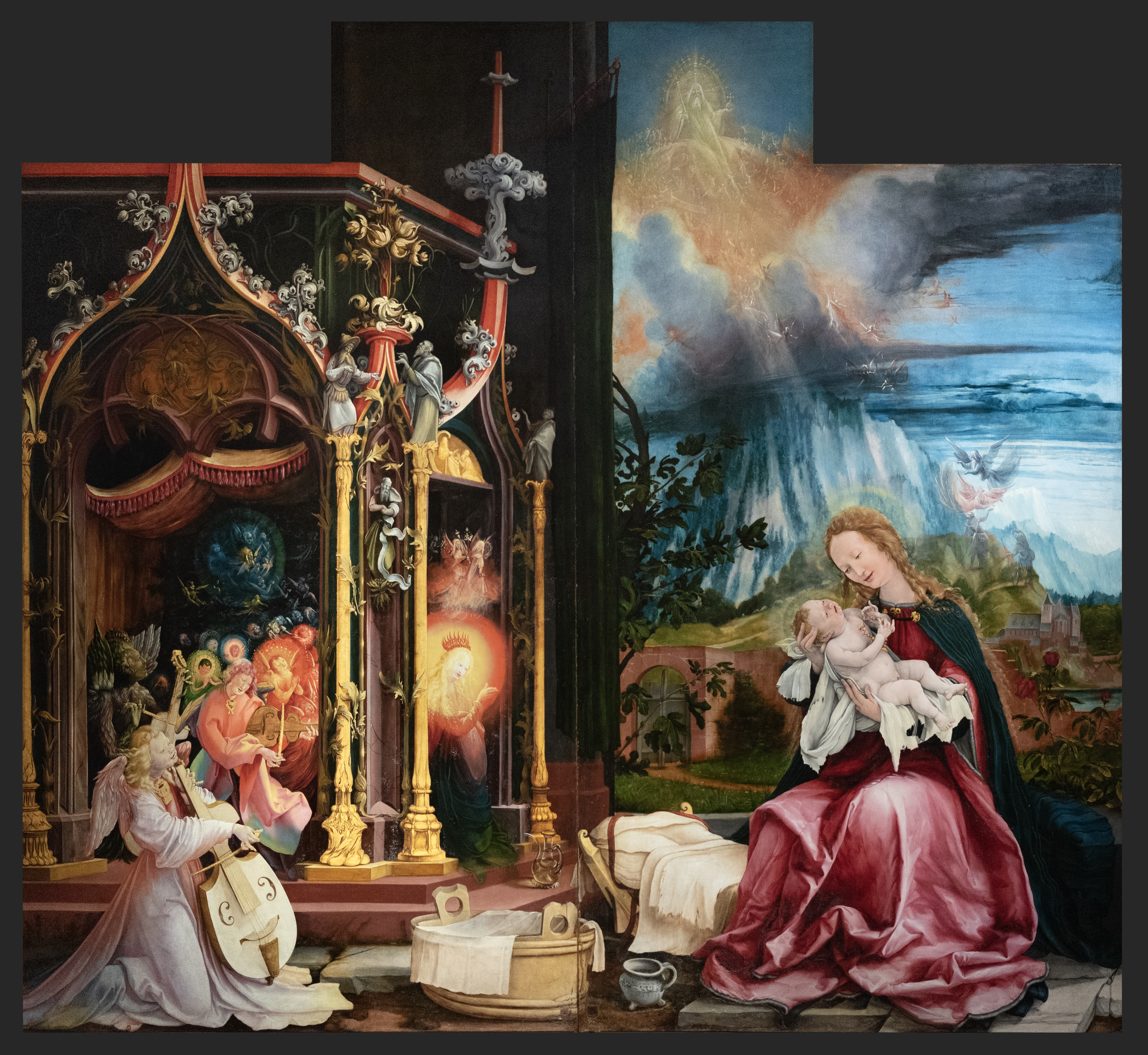

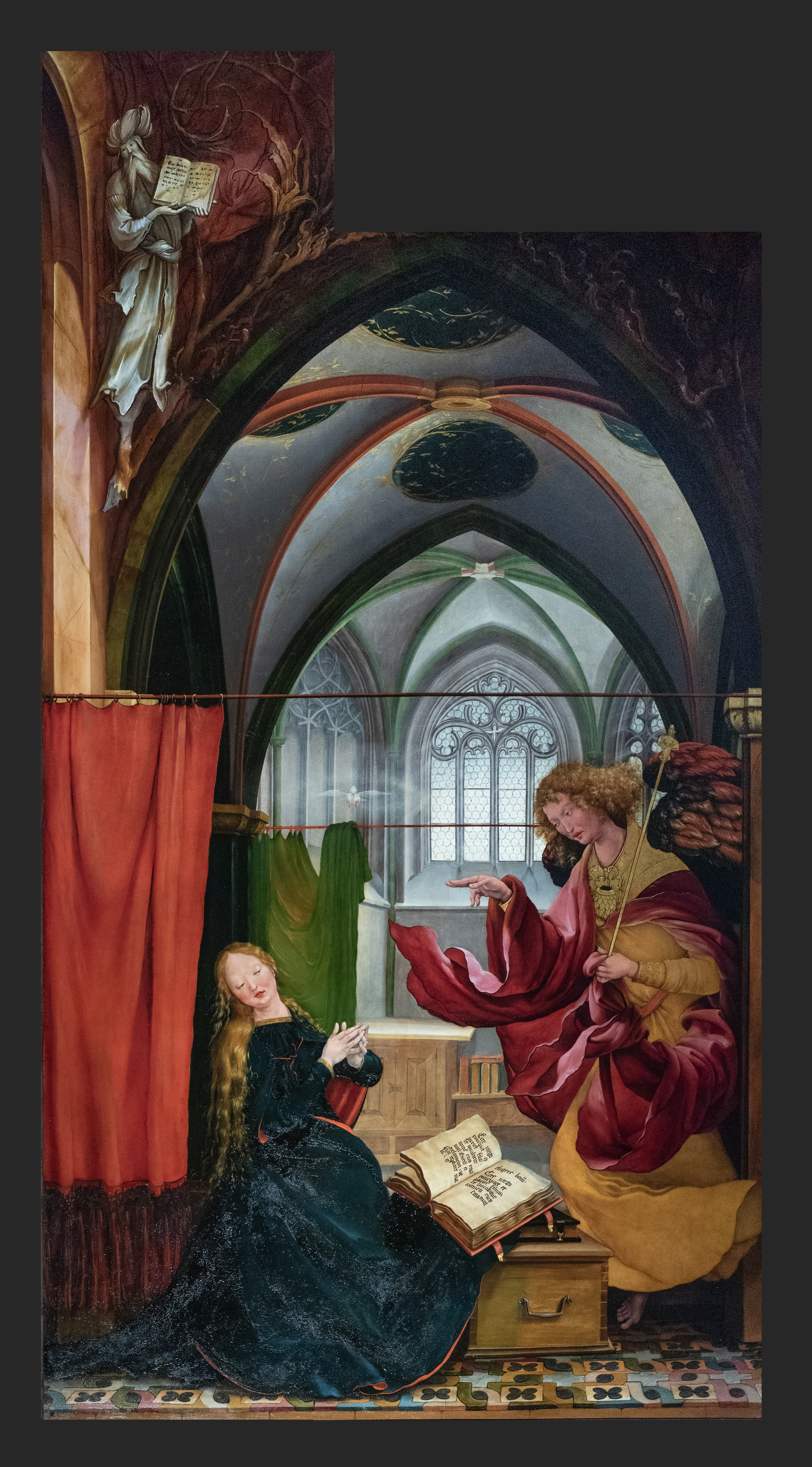
