= Behr =

- Language: German

Origin
- Meaning: Bear
- Region of origin: Germany

Other names
- Variant forms: Baer, Bear, Bähr

Behr is a given name and surname that derives from the German Bär (bear). Older forms of the name, Bela and Belo (related to the old High German Belo), occur in the Memorbuch. The diminutive forms Baeril (Berel) and Baerush (Berush) are used among Polish and Russian Jews.

An additional origin of the name is from Middle Dutch baer meaning naked or bare, possibly indicating someone who wore rags.

== Given name ==
- Behr Perlhefter (1650–1713), Jewish scholar and rabbi

== Surname ==
- Barbara Behr, photographer, film director and magazine editor
- Bernd Behr (born 1976), German artist
- Bill Behr (1919–1997), American professional basketball player
- Bram Behr (1951–1982), Surinamese journalist
- Carel Jacobus Behr (1812–1895), Dutch painter, watercolorist and draftsman
- Carl Behr (1874–1943), German ophthalmologist
- Carlos Boloña Behr (1950–2018), Peruvian politician
- Christoph Behr (born 1989), German footballer
- Dani Behr (born 1971), British television presenter and singer
- Edgar Behr (1910–1985), German sailor
- Emilio Behr (1995), Dutch DJ, record producer and musician known by his stage name Justin Mylo
- Felicia Minei Behr (1942–2025), American television producer and network executive
- Franz Behr (1837–1898), German composer
- Giorgio Behr (born 1948), Swiss businessman and professor
- Hans Hermann Behr (1818–1904), German-American botanist and entomologist
- Ira Steven Behr (born 1953), American television producer and scriptwriter
- James Behr, American pianist, composer, recording artist and educator
- Jason Behr (born 1973), American actor
- Jean-Paul Behr (born 1947), French chemist
- Johann Behr (1655–1700), an Austrian author, court official and composer
- John Behr (born 1966), British Eastern Orthodox priest and theologian
- Julia Behr, German portrait painter
- Kaelyn Behr, birth name of Styalz Fuego, an Australian music producer, vocalist and songwriter
- Karl Behr (1885–1949), American tennis player, banker, and survivor of the sinking of RMS Titanic
- Kurt von Behr (1890–1945), head of Einsatzstab Reichsleiter Rosenberg in France; see Bruno Lohse
- Mark Behr (1963–2015), South African author
- Matthias Behr (born 1955), German foil fencer.
- Noam Behr (born 1975), tennis player
- Ottomar von Behr (1810–1856), German-American meteorologist and naturalist
- Pamela Behr (born 1956), retired German alpine ski racer
- Paul Behr, recipient of the Knight's Cross of the Iron Cross
- Peter H. Behr (1915–1997), California State Senator and lawyer
- Rafael Behr, a columnist at The Guardian, since 2014, and former political editor at the New Statesman
- Reinhold Behr (born 1948), German fencer
- Seiko Kato Behr (1941–2010), Japanese-born American artist
- Sepp Behr (1929–2023), German Olympic alpine skier
- Therese Behr (1876–1959), German contralto (married name: Schnabel)
- Victor de Behr, Belgian athlete whose main event was water polo
- William Joseph Behr (1775–1851), German writer
- Winrich Behr (1918–2011), German soldier

== See also ==
- Baer, a surname
- Baehr, a surname
- Bahr (surname)
- Baire or René-Louis Baire (1874–1932), a French mathematician
- Edward Behr (disambiguation)
