= Bähre (surname) =

Bähre is a surname. Notable people with the surname include:

- Harry Bähre (born 1941), German footballer
- Karl Bähre (1899–1960), German water polo player
- Mike-Steven Bähre (born 1995), German footballer

== See also ==
- Bähr
