= Kaufmännische Schule Tauberbischofsheim =

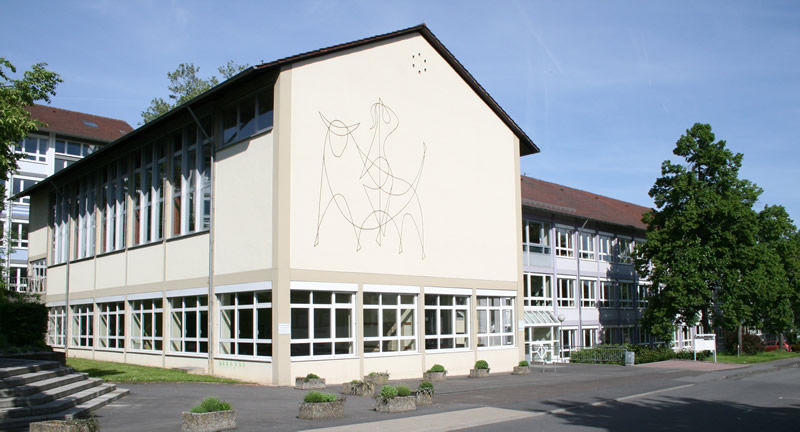

Location
- Dr.-Ulrich-Straße 1; 97941 Tauberbischofsheim; Main-Tauber-Kreis; Baden-Württemberg; Germany
- Coordinates: 49°37′31.9″N 9°39′21.5″E

Information
- School type: Public VABO, Berufsfachschule Wirtschaft, Kaufmännisches Berufskolleg, Wirtschaftsgymnasium, Kaufmännische Berufsschule
- Founded: 1921
- Head of school: Frank Stephan
- Grades: 10–13
- Website: www.kstbb.de

The Kaufmännische Schule Tauberbischofsheim (KSTBB) (Anglicisation: Tauberbischofsheim Commercial High School, also Tauberbischofsheim Vocational Business School) includes five different types of vocational schools. The school board of the Kaufmännische Schule Tauberbischofsheim is the Main-Tauber-Kreis and the school campuses in Tauberbischofsheim, in Baden-Württemberg, Germany.

== History ==
=== Early history ===
A vocational school was founded in Tauberbischofsheim in 1854, and was affiliated with a “trading post” until 1921. On August 15, 1901, the former City Council started the “bylaw for commercial training school in Tauberbischofsheim.” From November 1916 until May 1918, the “trading post” was completely closed because the only “trading teacher” had been called upon for military service in World War I.

=== From Establishment until the beginning of World War II. ===
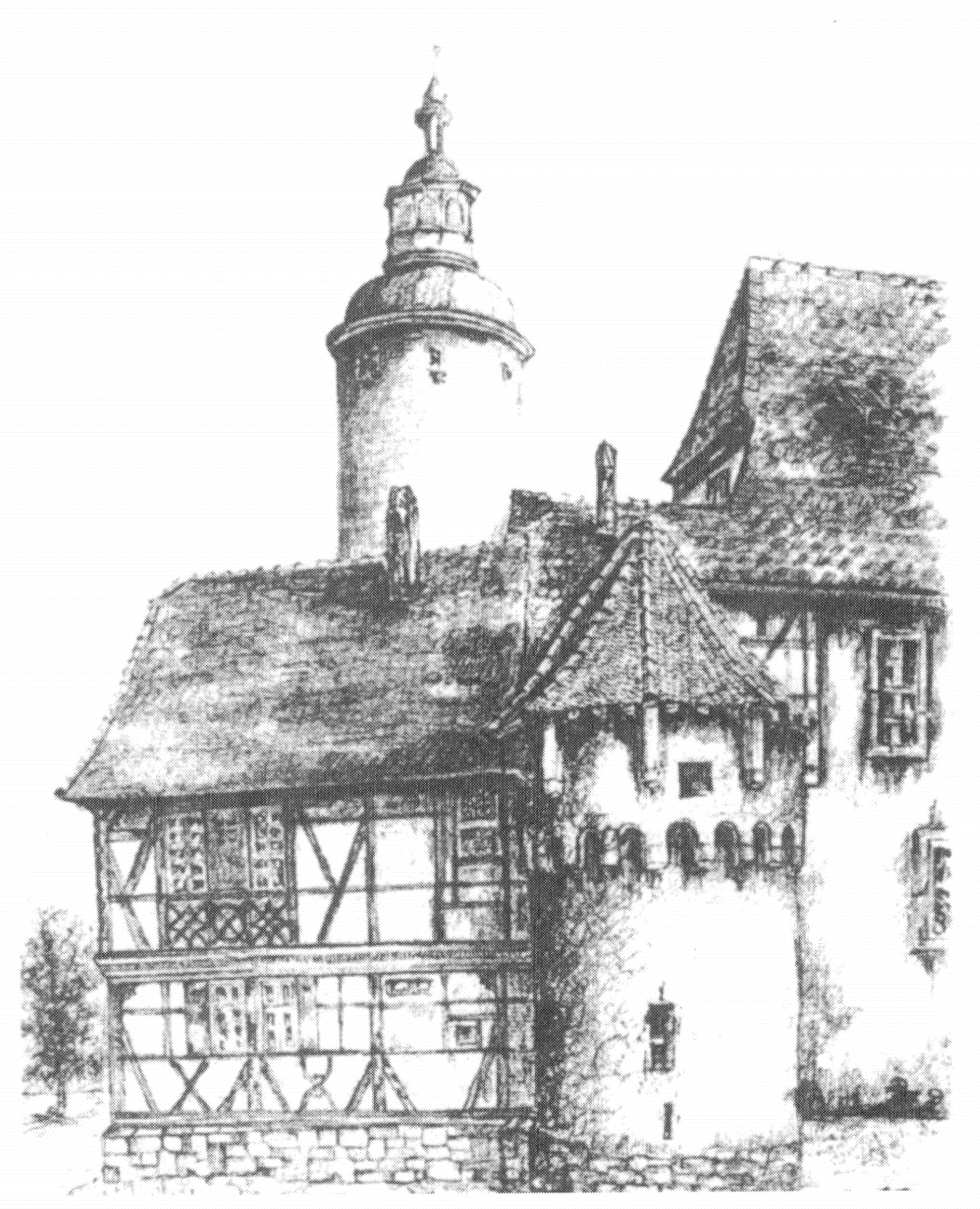
Kurmainzisches Schloss in Tauberbischofsheim, former School Building

On January 10, 1921, the Kaufmännische Schule Tauberbischofsheim was established by decree of the Ministry of Culture, in order to create a separation from the business school. The education of typing with a typewriter began as early as the autumn of 1924. In May 1925, the first class was taught in English. Starting in 1928, Tauberbischofsheim held the title “Aufbauoberrealschule” alongside the traditional Gymnasium, where one is awarded a diploma. On April 9, 1937, following the opening of the “commercial college”, two school trains were then set up to Tauberbischofsheim. With the beginning of the Second World War, the school system was set into place.

=== Resumption of school activities after the war ===
With the permission of the American Military, the school was the first commercial school in all of northern Baden that was allowed to teach again in the autumn of 1945. Josef Albicker was appointed as temporary headmaster. In 1956, the “Handels- und Höheren Handelschule mit Gemainschaftshaus” was built on Dr. Philipp-Adam-Ulrich-Straße and then inaugurated in 1957.

=== Time after move to new building ===
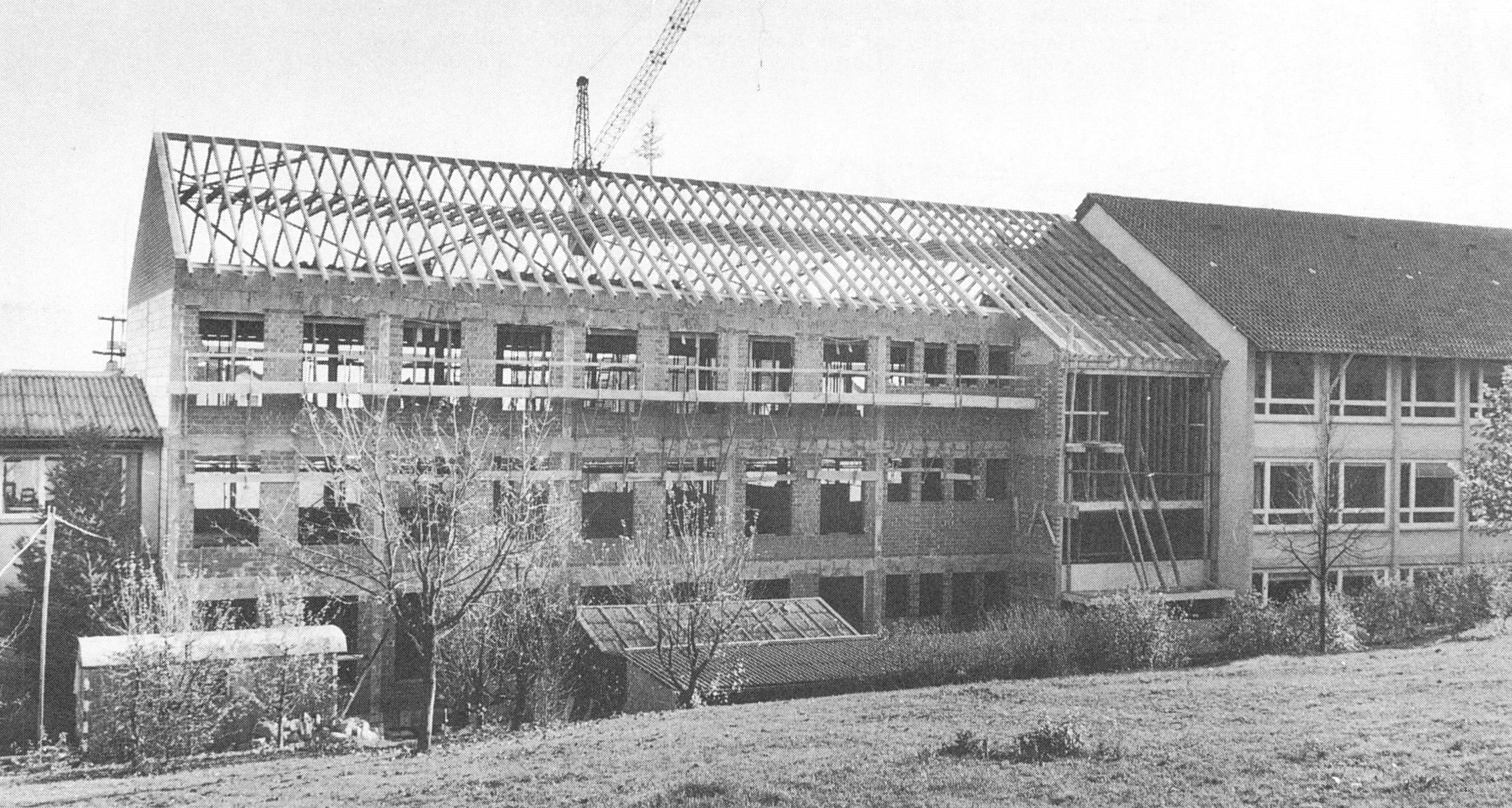

On September 7, 1967, the two-year business school was introduced as a pre-employment full-time school. The Economics High School was the first professional school to be opened in Main-Tauber-Kreis in 1968. In 1971, the first class was granted its diploma.

For the 75th anniversary of the Kaufmännischen Schule Tauberbischofsheim a school chronicle will be published. In 2004 the online school newspaper “Financial T(‘a)ime” was founded. In 2010 the concept of an “independently operating school” (OES) was introduced. In the same year, students and teachers from the partner school in Vitry-le-Francois, France, visited the Kaufmännische Schule Tauberbischofsheim and had the chance to experience the German school system. In 2011 Kaufmännische Schule Tauberbischofsheim won the "European Language Label" and in 2014 the "Media Award AIM Academy "for the best media concept of a vocational school in the Heilbronn-Franken region.

=== Renovation work the promote inclusion ===
In 2014 began the renovation of the hall, the staircase and all sanitary facilities through the extensive renovation work on school buildings by the County. In order to help the success of inclusion the school will also be receiving an elevator as well as disabled toilets, to help approve accessibility.

== Types of Schools and degrees ==
The Commercial School Tauberbischofsheim offers in the form of full and part-time schools the following qualifications and professional fields:

=== Full-time schools ===
==== VABO ====
- In German: Vorbereitungsjahr Arbeit und Beruf ohne Deutschkenntnisse (VABO)
- Duration: At least one year.
- Degree: There is no degree. The school year ends with a German test.
- Features: Mostly young migrants without German language skills receive a targeted language-support-program with a focus on German.

==== Two-year Business Vocational School ====
- In German: Zweijährige Berufsfachschule Wirtschaft (2BFW)
- Duration: two years
- Degree: Entrance qualification for technical school
- Features: In addition to regular Secondary school, graduates also receive a commercial education. Students work in practice firms.

==== Commercial Vocational College ====
- In German: Kaufmännisches Berufskolleg I und II (BK I u. II))
- Duration: one year
- Degree: Vocational School I: career preparation and subsequent access to vocational college degree II; Vocational School II:. College entrance and State Certified Business Assistant
- Features: Two different paths lead to two years for college entrance. Higher general education and basic business training will be taught.
  - Profile "practice firm": mediation commercial basic knowledge through practice firms.
  - Profile "Economic and data processing": deepening of knowledge in the field of commercial management and data processing.

==== Economic High School ====
- In German: Wirtschaftsgymnasium (WG)
- Prerequisites: Some High School/ technical school
- Duration: three years
- Degree: Diploma
- Features: Business-related subjects are taught, that combine general education and work-related content.
  - Profiles with emphasis on economics or finance.

=== Part-time schools ===
==== Vocational Business School ====
- In German: Kaufmännische Berufsschule (KBS)

As a part-time school, the commercial vocational school has the following features:

- Lessons take place in close cooperation with the training companies. Students have lessons one and a half days per week. Alternatively, other models and teaching blocks are offered.
- The training period usually covers three years. It ends with a degree in a recognized training occupation. Though shortening of the time for qualification is possible through apprenticeship, only after two or two and a half years.

At the Kaufmännischen Schule Tauberbischofsheim the following apprenticeships are offered: banker, industrial clerk, office administrator, businessman for office communication, administrators, employee, warehouse operator, sellers, warehouseman and retail clerk.

== Special Features ==
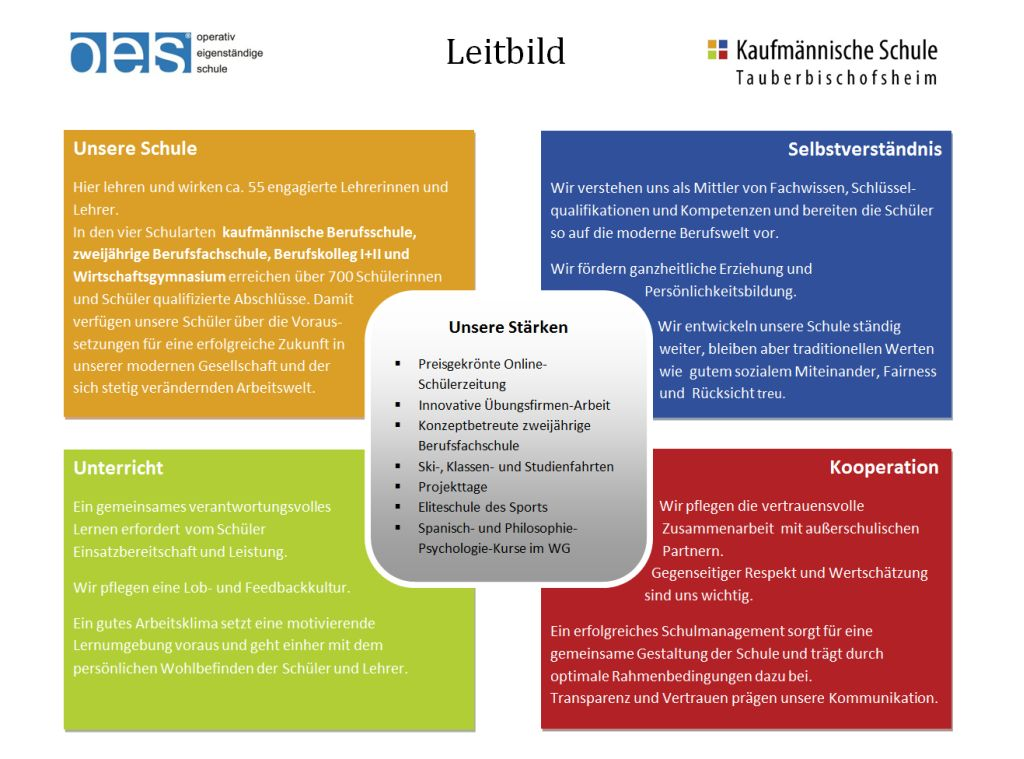
KSTBB quality model

=== Independently Operated School ===
The KSTBB has been an independently operated school since November 2010. This is based on the concept of the State of Baden-Württemberg as a, “comprehensive system of internal school quality development and changes in administrative control for vocational schools in Baden-Württemberg". In this context, we developed a quality model that represents the characteristics, strengths and target areas of the school. Showcasing this are the following features:

=== School Newspaper "Financial T(‘a)ime" ===
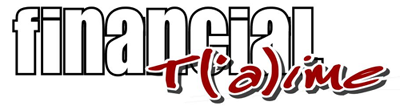
Financial T(’a)ime, KSTBB school newspaper

The school newspaper is known around the school community and the town of Tauberbischofsheim and is offered at various prices.

=== European Language Label ===
At the school, a cooperation was developed with the French school “Lycee Alexandre Dumas”, located in Illkirch (Alsace) and the State Academy for training and staff development in schools of Baden-Württemberg as an education project for, “German-French virtual online market - application-oriented language learning by creation of virtual companies and handling of business processing and development.” This was part of the competition, “Language learning in the community – Using resources and building relationships” and was awarded the European Language Label in 2011.

=== Elite School of Sports ===
In 2009, KSTBB received the Predicate Elite School of Sports award from the German Olympic Sports Confederation (DOSB) in cooperation with the Fencing-Club Tauberbischofsheim and four other partner schools in Tauberbischofsheim.

=== Student FAQ ===
KSTBB Student FAQ

The “Student FAQ” (in German: Schüler-FAQ) was started in 2011 as a way to promote students’ self-organization. The FAQ was co-developed largely by students and now includes more than 200 pages of prospective student questions and corresponding answers that are usually formulated from a student perspective. It is offered at school and especially to new students for recurring questions and gives targeted responses. The "Student FAQ" is on all school desktop computers and is also available online.

=== Media Prize ===
In 2014, KSTBB was awarded 15,000 euros as the second prize for the best media concept of a vocational school. The award was presented by the Academy for Innovative Education and Management (AIM) and was awarded in Heilbronn. Due to this, a successful introduction of modern media was achieved. In 2009, the school led the way as one of the first schools to install “Active Boards”. Through its online student newspaper Financial Times experiences were thus made accessible to everyone. Thus became the school Germany's point of contact for other schools that were interested in this technology.

=== Tablet Model School ===
KSTBB is one of the twelve professional schools, which was selected in 2014 by the Ministry of Baden-Württemberg to participate in the experiment of the use of tablets in the classroom. Through this, the modern workings of the professional world are brought to the classroom as well as teaching the students the reality of our modern working world. To investigate the effect of tablets on the learning process, the experiment will be highly focused on the subjects of Mathematics, Economics, and Languages in a scientific manner.

== School Life ==
=== Cafeteria ===
For lunch, the school has a cafeteria combined with a coffee shop and an attached lounge.

=== Events ===
At KSTBB the following events take place: Competence Days, school trips, the youth train for the Olympics, Christmas and End-Year celebrations, as well as project days. Other events and activities are organized by the students.

=== Working Groups and Simulation Games ===
The following working groups and simulation games are offered: The FN youth project Franconian News, the Stock Market of the Unions, Stock Exchange simulation with the savings bank, shirt-store simulation game, the German Founder Award for Students, competition creative minds in the Tauber Valley, a decision training BEST (the "career and study orientation"), a school band and a project "Alpine crossing for students with a mountain bike."

=== Practice Firms “Tauberbischofsheim Model” ===
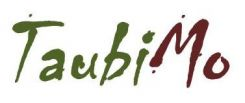
Practice Firms “Tauberbischofsheim Model”

A practice firm is a simulated enterprise. Students act with other practice firms with virtual goods and money. The goal is a stronger practical orientation of teaching. The practice firms of KSTBB operate on the "Tauberbischofsheim model" (TaubiMo). This has the following features: use of integrated enterprise software, implementation of the pedagogical principle of a closed shop, processing all entry and sales processes in a virtual market, quantitative and qualitative safeguard earnings, achieving a paperless office and the use of modern media (virtual networks in the form of an Online-Cloud). In 2014, the Leonardo da Vinci organization of Italian teachers from the business schools of Gubbio and Perugia, were interested in the model from KSTBB.

=== European Finance Driving License ===
KSTBB is one of the few schools in Germany and the first in the Main-Tauber-Kreis to offer the opportunity of taking the “European Financial Driver’s License”. Through the initiative “€FDL” the financial knowledge of young students as well as adults was tested, tested and confirmed with a certificate.

=== Foreign Languages ===
The languages taught at KSTBB are: German (for non-native speaker), English, Spanish, and French.

=== Student Exchange ===
KSTBB promotes student exchange projects with scholarship recipients from Spanish and English speaking countries, including students from The United States, who then live in Tauberbischofsheim with host families assigned to them by their exchange organizations.

=== Special Learning Performances ===
At the vocational school of the Mercantile School the following courses are offered as a voluntary option: Seminar courses in the 12th grade as a "special achievement" for replacement of a fourth (written) or fifth (oral) final exam subject, a literature course in the 13th grade and a philosophy- psychology course in the 13th grade.

== Notable alumni ==
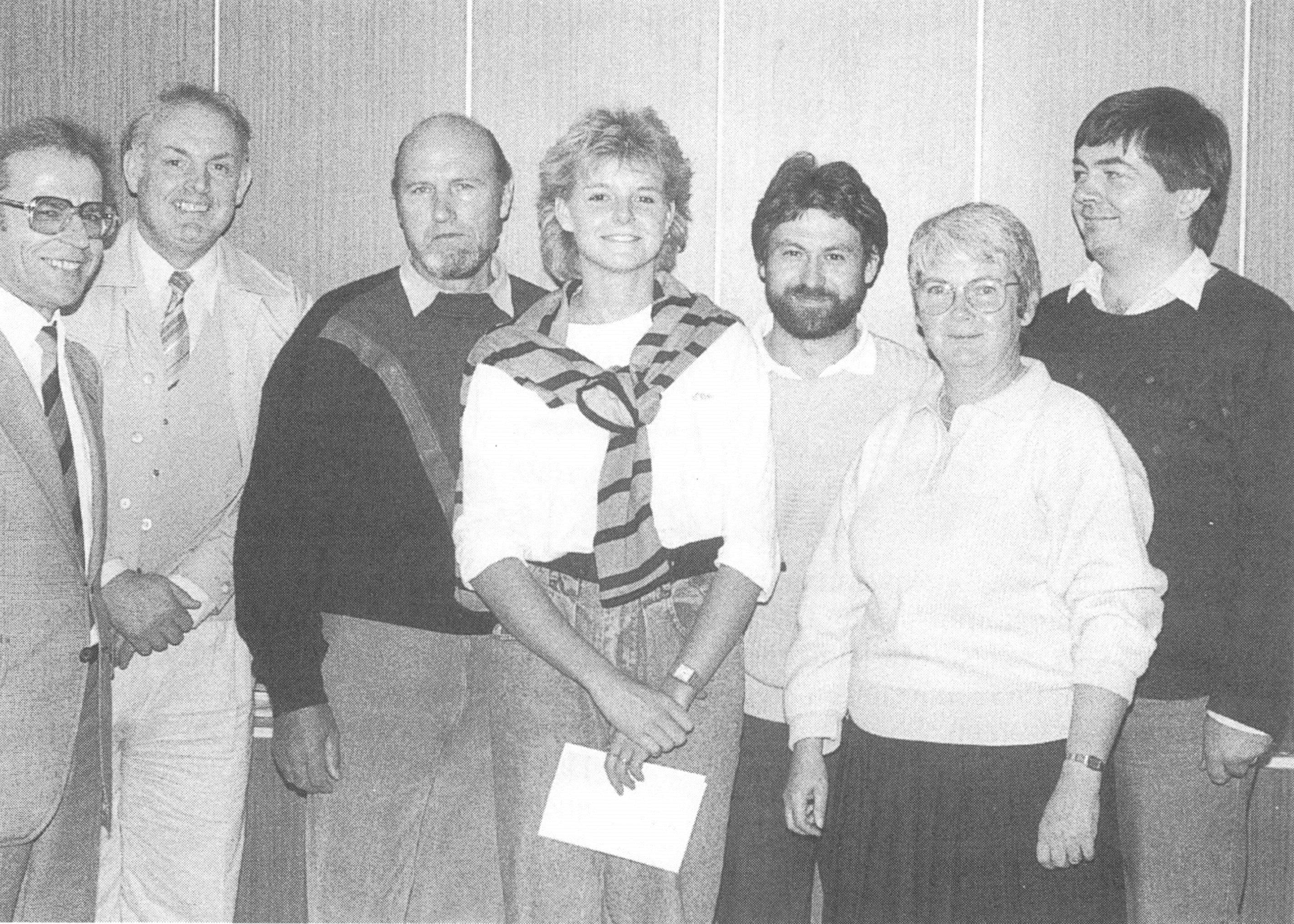
Anja Fichtel and teachers of the KSTBB, 1985/86

Well Known Students:

- Wolfgang Reinhart; German politician, received his Diploma at the Economic High School.
- Anja Fichtel; former German foil fencer, was a student at KSTBB.
- Other famous fencers from the Fencing-Club Tauberbischofsheim (Olympic training center), that attended the school: Simone Bauer, Gesine Schiel, Rita König, Harald Hein, Matthias Behr, Elmar Borrmann, Thorsten Weidner, Jacek Huchwajda, Michael Huchwajda, Michael Flegler, Norman Ackermann and Carolin Golubytskyi.

== See also ==
- Vocational school
