= Emil Beck (coach) =

German fencing coach (1935–2006)

Emil Beck (20 July 1935, Tauberbischofsheim – 12 March 2006) was a German fencing coach.

== Biography ==
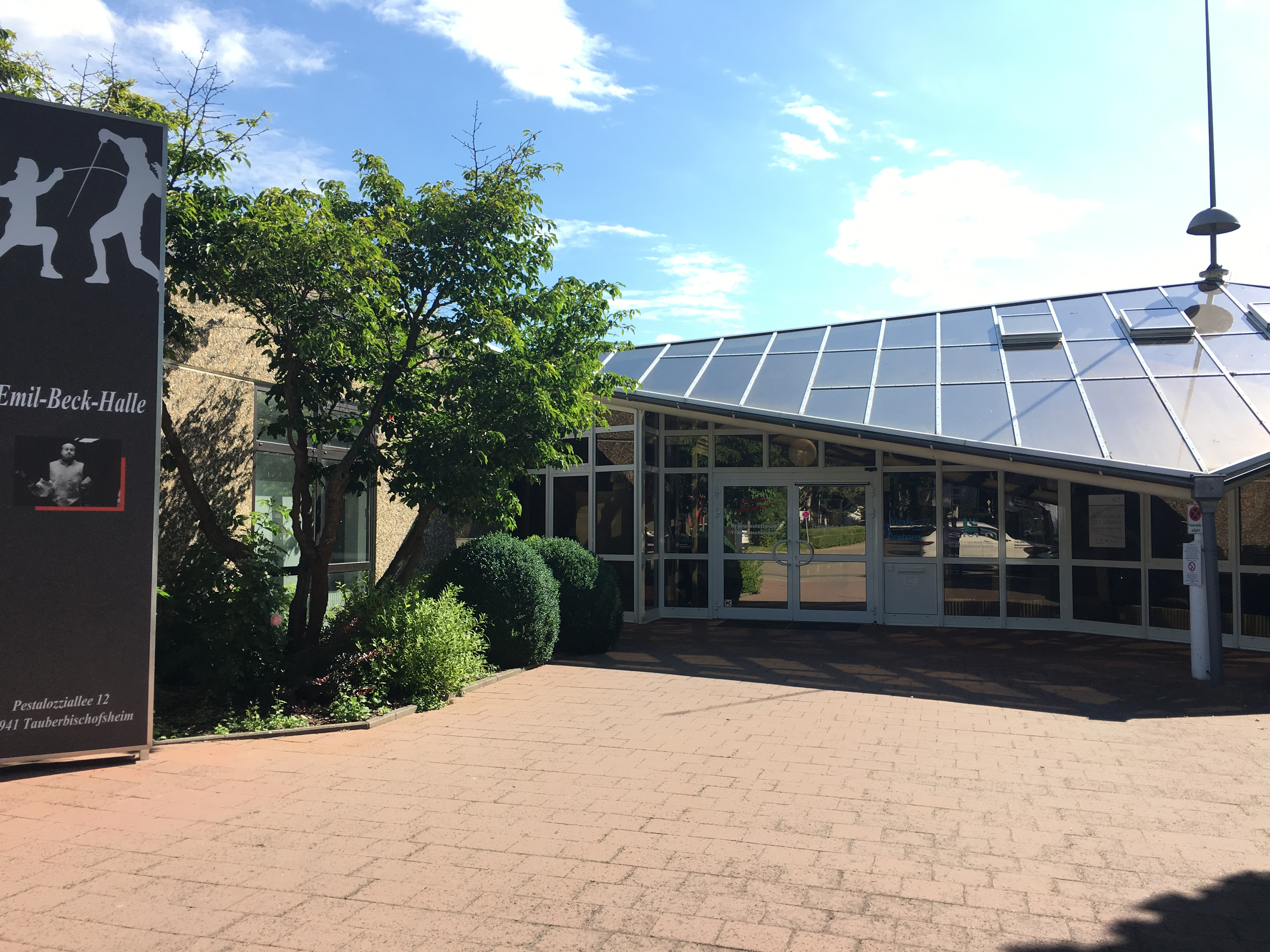
"Founding father" Emil Beck - his life's work: The Fencing-Club Tauberbischofsheim with the Emil-Beck-Gym

Emil Beck was born in Tauberbischofsheim, in the Main-Tauber-District of Baden-Württemberg in Germany on 12 July 1935. The former hairdresser Emil Beck began in the mid-1950s with fencing. Fencing scenes from the movie The Three Musketeers had impressed the young man. In 1954 Emil Beck was the "founding father" of the Fencing-Club Tauberbischofsheim. He created a school of fencing sometimes referred to as the "German school" since Beck's influence on German fencing was profound. As a fencing coach, Beck was largely self-taught.

Considering Becks medal success, he is one of the most successful coaches in the world (with 163 medals at Olympic Games, World Championships and European Championships). Beck coined the reputation of the Fencing-Club Tauberbischofsheim in the 1970s as "Tauberbischofsheimer goldsmith" and "Mecca of fencing".

Beck trained fencers such as Matthias Behr, Alexander Pusch and Anja Fichtel. At the height of his career, the German fencers Anja Fichtel, Sabine Bau and Zita Funkenhauser – all from the FC Tauberbischofsheim – won gold, silver and bronze in foil at the 1988 Olympics in Seoul. Beck was succeeded as German fencing team leader by Matthias Behr.

12 March 2006 Emil Beck died of heart failure.

== Honours ==
- "Honorary medal" of the Fédération Internationale d'Escrime (International Fencing Federation).
- honorary citizen of Tauberbischofsheim, 23 June 1989.

== Beck as a name giver ==
- "Emil Beck Memorial Award"; with this award the Fencing-Club Tauberbischofsheim honors personalities who have done something extraordinary and outstanding for fencing.
- "Emil-Beck-Hall" in Tauberbischofsheim

== Quotes about Beck ==
Some quotes of famous personalities about Beck illustrate his life's work at the Fencing-Club Tauberbischofsheim:

He was a charismatic personality who not let someone indifferent. His life's work is outstanding, he has changed fencing and his hometown positively and that will reverberate for a long time.

— Thomas Bach,

Tauberbischofsheim would never have this reputation without Emil Beck.

— Matthias Behr,

The honorary president of the German Fencing Association (DFeB), Gordon Rapp, paid tribute to Becks commitment as:

Unique in the world. Fencing in Germany and even international would not have this status without Emil Beck.

— Gordon Rapp,

== Works ==
- Emil Beck: Tauberbischofsheimer Fechtlektionen für Anfänger und Fortgeschrittene. Philippka-Verlag, Münster 1987, ISBN 978-3870390150.
- Emil Beck: Richtig Fechten. BLV Verlag, München 1990, ISBN 978-3405137342.
- Emil Beck: Fechten. Florett, Degen, Säbel. Falken-Verlag, Niedernhausen im Taunus 1995, ISBN 978-3806804492.
- Emil Beck, Berndt Barth: Fechttraining. Meyer-Verlag, Aachen 2004, ISBN 978-3898991162.
- Emil Beck (editor), Berndt Barth (editor): The Complete Guide to Fencing, 366 pages, Meyer & Meyer, Aachen 2006, ISBN 978-1841261911.
