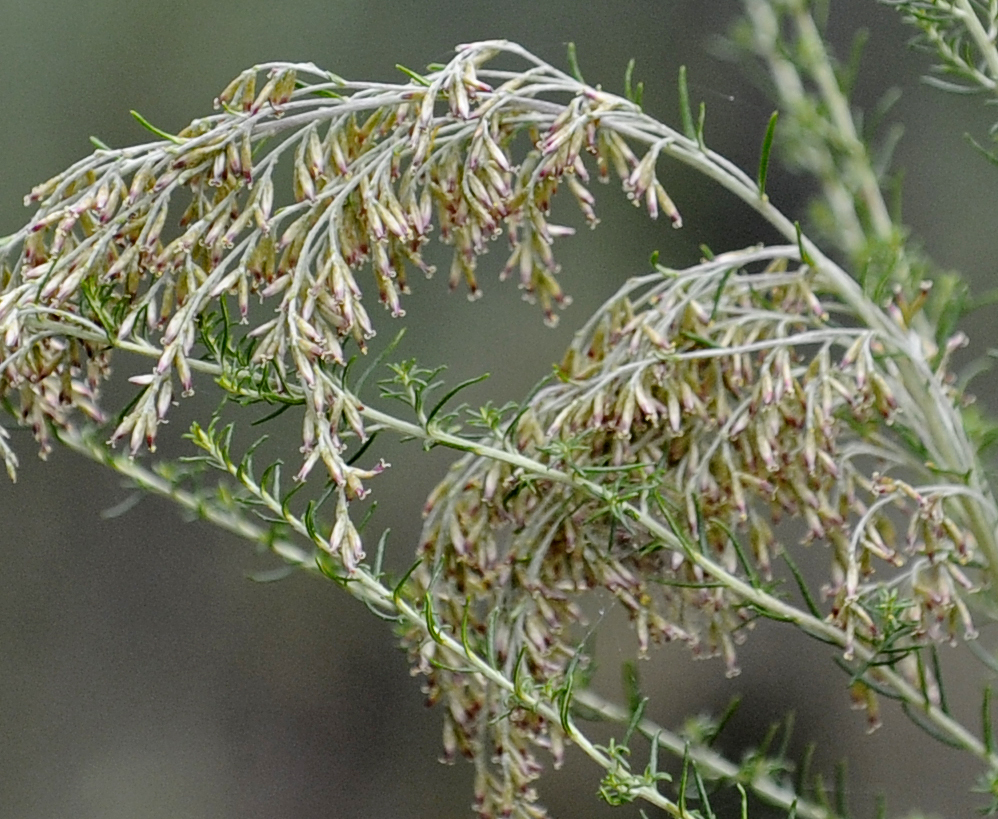
- Cassinia sifton in Warrandyte Wildflower Reserve

Scientific classification
- Kingdom: Plantae
- Clade: Tracheophytes
- Clade: Angiosperms
- Clade: Eudicots
- Clade: Asterids
- Order: Asterales
- Family: Asteraceae
- Genus: Cassinia
- Species: C. sifton

Binomial name
- Cassinia sifton Orchard

Synonyms
- Cassinia paniculata Behr & F.Muell. ex Sond.

= Cassinia sifton =

Sifton bush

Species of plant

Cassinia sifton, commonly known as sifton bush, is a species of flowering plant in the family Asteraceae and is endemic to south-eastern continental Australia and an introduced species in other places. It is a multi-stemmed shrub with linear leaves, and more or less conical heads of 50 to 200 deep red to pale brown flowers. It is sometimes confused with Cassinia arcuata and authorities differ on its distribution.

== Description ==
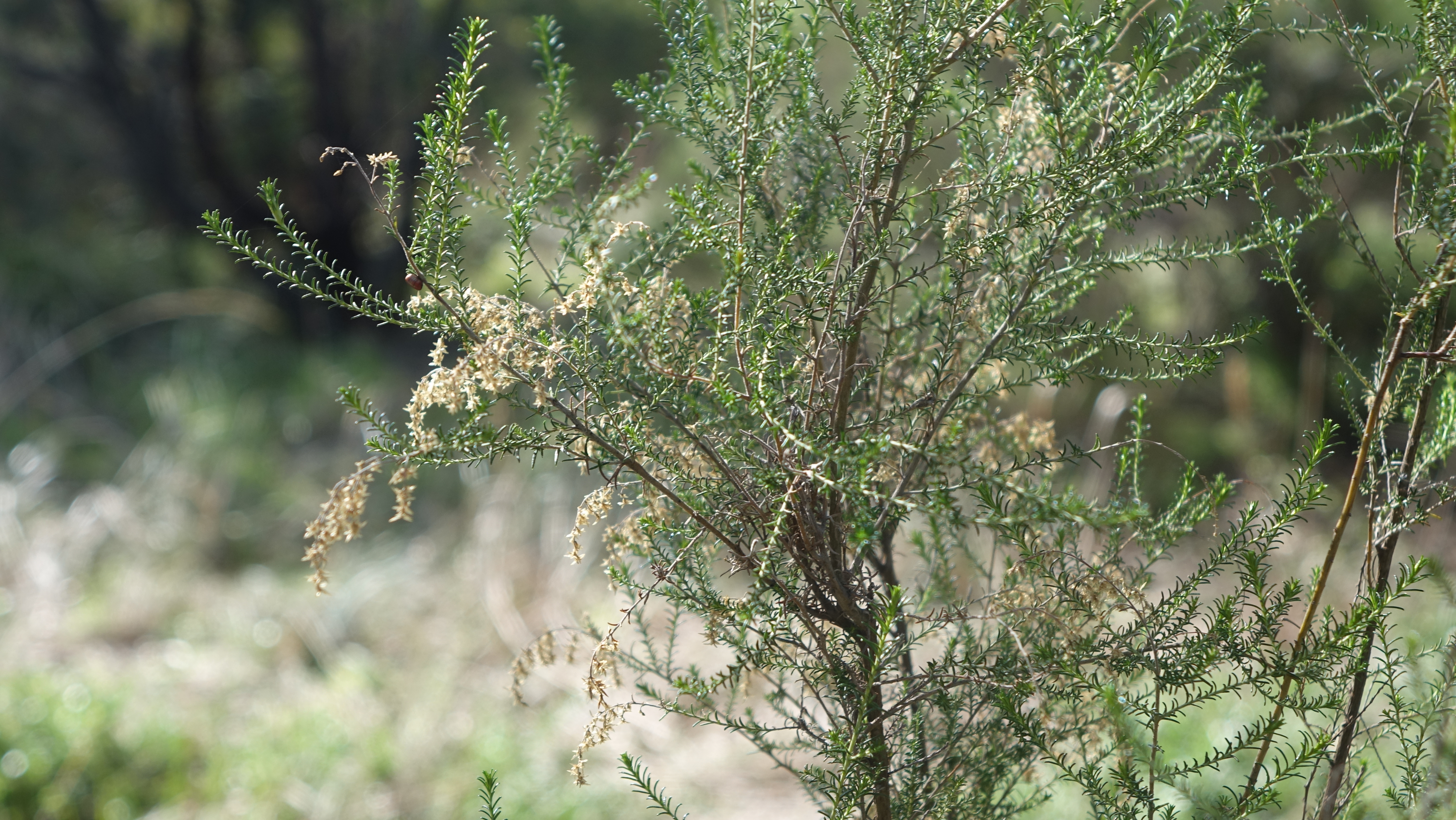
Cassinia sifton habit

Cassinia sifton is an erect, aromatic, multi-stemmed shrub that typically grows to a height of 1.2–2.0 m (3 ft 11 in – 6 ft 7 in), its branchlets with a few cottony hairs. The leaves are linear, mostly 6–9 mm (0.24–0.35 in) long and 0.5–0.7 mm (0.020–0.028 in) wide with the edges rolled under so that the leaves appear needle-shaped. Between fifty and two hundred heads are arranged in more or less conical groups, each head 3.0–3.5 mm (0.12–0.14 in) long, greenish-white at first, later red to brown. Flowering mostly occurs from February to April and the achenes are 0.8–1.0 mm (0.031–0.039 in) long with a pappus of bristles about 2.0–2.5 mm (0.079–0.098 in) long.

== Taxonomy and naming ==
Cassinia sifton was first formally described in 2017 by Anthony Edward Orchard in Australian Systematic Botany from specimens collected about 10 km (6.2 mi) east of Stockinbingal. It was previously included in C. arcuata

== Distribution and habitat ==
Sifton bush is a pioneer plant, especially on poor soils, and often invades overgrazed pastures. It is widespread in central New South Wales and widespread and common in Victoria. In New South Wales it invades disturbed areas such as roadsides, cleared and ploughed areas and is classed as a weed. It has been introduced to the Australian Capital Territory, South Australia and Western Australia.
