= Bähr =

Bähr (transliterated Baehr) is a German surname. Notable people with the surname include:

- Barbara Baehr (born Hoffmann, 1953), German research scientist, entomologist, arachnologist, and spider taxonomist
- Bettina Bähr-Losse (born 1967), German lawyer and politician
- Eduardo Bähr (1940–2023), Honduran writer and actor
- Ferdinand Baehr (1822–1892), American politician
- George Bähr (1666–1738), German architect
- Herman C. Baehr (1866–1942), American politician
- Johann Bähr (1655–1700), Austrian author, court official and composer
- Johann Christian Felix Baehr (1798–1872), German philologist
- Johann Karl Bähr (1801–1869), German painter and writer
- Klaus-Dieter Bähr (born 1941), German rower
- Kristina Baehr (born 1980 or 1981), American attorney
- Ludwig Baehr, German officer, diplomat and artist
- Markus Bähr (born 1974), German former professional footballer
- Martin Baehr (1943–2019), German entomologist
- Mathias Bähr (born 1960), German neurologist
- Mimmi Bähr (1844–1923), Finnish inventor
- Otto Bähr (1817–1895), German legal scholar
- Pierre Baehr (born 1954), French former backstroke swimmer
- Robert Allen (actor) (born Irvine E. Theodore Baehr, 1906–1998), American actor
- Ted Baehr (born 1946), American media critic
- Tom Baehr-Jones (born 1980), American physicist
- Ulrich Baehr (artist), German artist
- Ulrich Baehr (astronomer), German astronomer, eponym for the asteroid 26821 Baehr

== See also ==
- Baire
