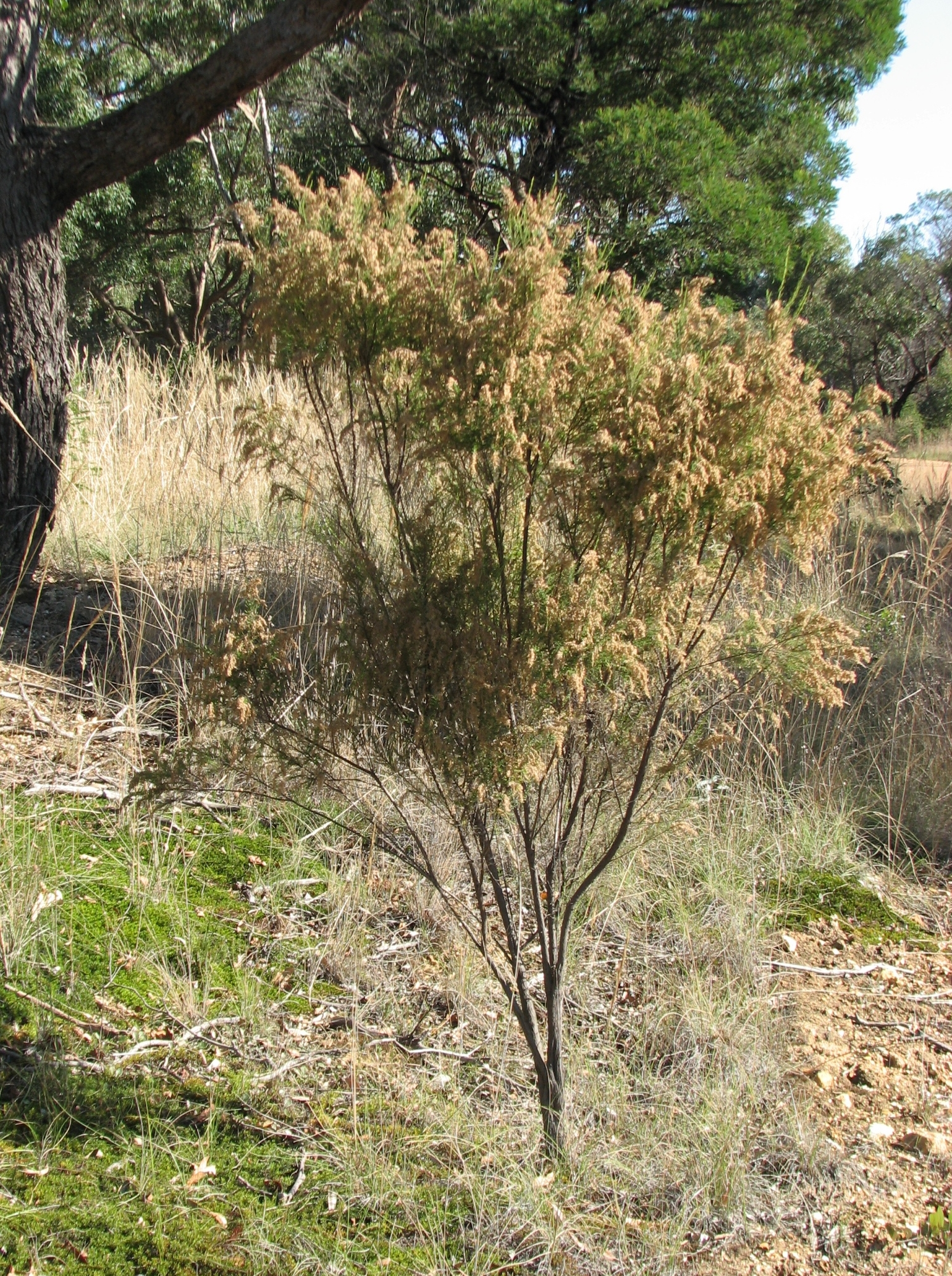

Scientific classification
- Kingdom: Plantae
- Clade: Tracheophytes
- Clade: Angiosperms
- Clade: Eudicots
- Clade: Asterids
- Order: Asterales
- Family: Asteraceae
- Genus: Cassinia
- Species: C. arcuata

Binomial name
- Cassinia arcuata R.Br.

Synonyms
- Cassinia paniculata Behr & F.Muell. ex Sond.

= Cassinia arcuata =

Species of plant

Cassinia arcuata, commonly known as drooping cassinia, biddy bush, Chinese scrub, sifton bush and Chinese shrub, is a species of flowering plant in the family Asteraceae and is endemic to Australia. It is a shrub, sometimes a small tree with sessile, linear leaves, and heads of up to two hundred brownish flowers arranged in pyramid-shaped panicles. In New South Wales, the species is known as Cassinia sifton. In disturbed areas, C. arcuata can become weedy.

== Description ==
Cassinia arcuata is a densely-branched, erect shrub or small tree that typically grows to a height of 1–2 m (3 ft 3 in – 6 ft 7 in) but sometimes to 4 m (13 ft), with densely cottony-hairy branches and sometimes a curry-like aroma. The leaves are linear, 2.5–10 mm (0.098–0.394 in) long and 0.5–1 mm (0.020–0.039 in) wide with the edges rolled under. Up to two hundred heads are arranged in pyramid-shaped panicles 30–80 mm (1.2–3.1 in) long with involucral bracts about 4 mm (0.16 in) long in four whorls around each of two or three brownish florets. Flowering mostly occurs from January to May and the achenes are 0.8–1.0 mm (0.031–0.039 in) long with a pappus of twenty-two to twenty-eight bristles 1.5–3 mm (0.059–0.118 in) long.

Sifton Bush has been implicated in poisoning of stock and causing dermatitis in sheep. Some Cassinia species are known to cause allergic skin and respiratory reactions.

== Taxonomy and naming ==
Cassinia arcuata was first formally described in 1818 by Robert Brown in Transactions of the Linnean Society of London.

Cassinia sifton Orchard has been confused with C. arcuata and the National Herbarium of New South Wales lists only C. sifton as occurring in New South Wales. Plants of the World Online list both species as occurring in New South Wales.

Richard Hind Cambage used the name "Sifting Bush" for this species in 1902, comparing the fallen florets to "the 'siftings' which are blown away from grain by a winnowing machine". That name has since been corrupted to 'Sifton bush' in the mistaken belief that it referred to a person named Sifton.

The National Herbarium of NSW notes that:

There has been a long history of confusion between the names Cassinia arcuata and C. sifton, sometimes identified also as C. theodorii. In the 20th century it was proclaimed a noxious weed under the name of Cassinia arcuata. C. sifton has red flowers and an elongate spike inflorescence; C. arcuata has white flowers and a pyramidal and dense inforescence.

== Distribution and habitat ==
Despite the use of "Chinese bush" as a common name in some sources, Cassinia arcuata and C. sifton are both endemic to Australia and do not occur in China.

According to the Australian Plant Census, C. arcuata occurs in Western Australia, South Australia, New South Wales, the Australian Capital Territory and Victoria. It grows in mallee and woodland, and invades disturbed areas.

The National Herbarium of Victoria considers C. sifton to be "widespread and common" in Victoria and that records prior to 2017 refer to that species. The National Herbarium of NSW assigns all records of C. arcuata from NSW to C. sifton.

== Use in horticulture ==
Drooping cassinia is an easily cultivated plant. It requires well-drained soils, grows in full or partial shade, but does not tolerate salt winds and is not long-lived.
