= Jacek Huchwajda =

German fencer

Personal information
- Born: 3 April 1967 (age 59) Poznań, Poland

Sport
- Sport: Fencing

Jacek Huchwajda (born 3 April 1967) is a German fencer. He competed in the team sabre event at the 1992 Summer Olympics. He currently serves as an assistant coach on the Duke University Fencing team.

== Biography ==
Jacek Huchwajda attended the Kaufmännische Schule Tauberbischofsheim and fought for the Fencing-Club Tauberbischofsheim.
