= Baehre =

Bähre or Baehre is a German-language surname. It may refer to:

- Bo Kanda Lita Baehre (1999), German athlete
- Harry Bähre (1941), former German footballer
- Karl Bähre (1899–1960), German water polo player
