= Edward Behr =

Edward Behr may refer to:

- Edward Behr (journalist) (1926–2007), British journalist
- Edward Behr (food writer) (born 1951), American food writer
