= Ludwig Baehr =

German army officer, diplomat and artist

Ludwig Baehr was an officer in the German Imperial Army who became both a diplomat and an artist. He played an important role in the cultural exchange between Russian and German artists following the Russian and German Revolutions.

By 1916 he had attained the rank of Hauptmann (captain), and published Die militärische Ansicht-Skizze im Felde (Military Elevation Sketches in the field).

Following his participation in the German diplomatic team at the Brest-Litovsk conference, which negotiated the Treaty of Brest-Litovsk, Baehr was posted to Moscow as part of the diplomatic mission there, with a brief to develop contacts with the intelligentsia. Here he made friends with Vassily Kandinsky. He put Kandinsky in touch with Bruno Taut, Walter Gropius and Max Pechstein, who were linked with the Novembergruppe and the Arbeitsrat für Kunst (Workers' Council for Art – WCA). Baehr was able to act as channel of communication between the avant-garde artists of Berlin and Russia for most of 1919.

However Baehr was also the middle-man in a deal to buy 25-50 million rubles worth of printing presses and Russian language school books in Germany using Russian credits in Denmark. However, in July 1919 he was informed by the German Foreign Office that they would not permit this transaction to go ahead. He was arrested in late 1919 in Lithuania and the 13 crates of material he had with him were confiscated.
