= Winrich Behr =

German officer during World War II (1918-2011)

- Born: 22 January 1918; Berlin, German Empire
- Died: 25 April 2011 (aged 93); Hubbelrath, Germany
- Relatives: Nicolaus von Below (brother in law)
- Military career
- Allegiance: Nazi Germany
- Branch: Army
- Rank: Major
- Unit: 3./AufklAbt 3
- Conflicts: World War II
- Awards: Knight's Cross of the Iron Cross

Winrich Behr (22 January 1918 – 25 April 2011) was a German officer during World War II. He was on the intelligence staff of the Sixth Army during the Stalingrad encirclement and was on one of the last planes to leave the encircled city on January 23. Behr had served Friedrich Paulus, Erwin Rommel, Gunther von Kluge, Walter Model. He was the witness of Model's last hours in Ruhr Pocket.

In January 1943 he was sent by Paulus to try to convince Hitler of the hopelessness of winning the war on the Eastern Front; this mission did not succeed.

After the war, Behr began studying at the University of Bonn. He served as the assistant general secretary of the Europäische Wirtschaftsgemeinschaft (EWG, or European Economic Union) Commission in Brussels.

A decade after the war, Winrich Behr sought out the burial site of the Field Marshal Walter Model in the isolated woods south of Duisburg, together with Hansgeorg Model, the field marshal's son.

== Awards ==
- Knight's Cross of the Iron Cross on 15 May 1941 as Oberleutnant and chief of the 3./Aufklärungs-Abteilung 3 in the DAK
