= Jean-Paul Behr =

French chemist (born 1947)

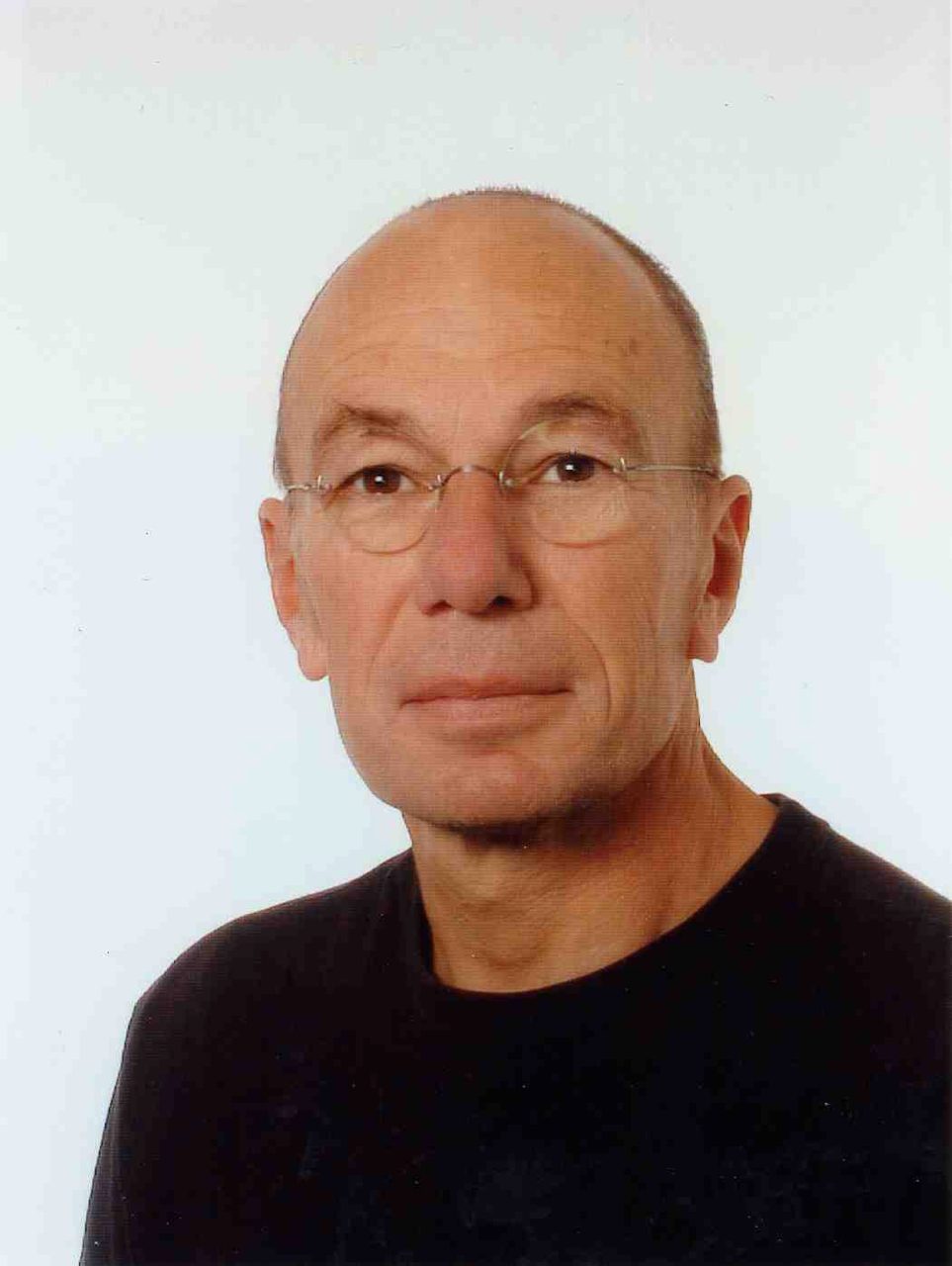
Jean-Paul Behr, member of the French Académie des sciences

Jean-Paul Behr (born 29 June 1947) is a French chemist, elected member of the French Academy of Sciences (since December 2008).

Research director at the CNRS, he is known for his work in the field of nucleic acid vectorization.

== Training and career ==
- 1969 Engineer ENS Chimie de Strasbourg
- 1973 Doctor of Science
- 1974- Research fellow, then research director at the CNRS
- 1989- Director of the Genetic Chemistry Laboratory at the University of Strasbourg

== Scientific activities ==
Jean-Paul Behr has spent most of his career at the University of Strasbourg. After a doctorate in physical organic chemistry under the supervision of Jean-Marie Lehn (1973) followed by a postdoctoral internship in England, he founded the Genetic Chemistry Laboratory at the Faculty of Pharmacy in Strasbourg. His research there focused mainly on the development of molecules capable of encapsulating DNA and transporting it inside living cells. Jean-Paul Behr developed the first effective lipid vectors, then polymeric, which were marketed under the names TransfectamTM, LipofectamineTM and jetPEITM. These vectors are widely used as transfection agents for animal cells in culture, but also as drug-gene carriers in clinical gene therapy trials. To this end, he founded two biotechnology companies, Eurothéra (1994–97) and Polyplus-transfection (2001).

== Awards and honours ==
- Research & Sharing Prize "Gene Therapy" (1992)
- CNRS Silver Medal (1998)
- Paul Ehrlich Prize, Society of Therapeutic Chemistry (2000)
- Grand Prize founded by the State of the French Academy of Sciences (2000)
- Biotech Award of the International Pharmaceutical Federation (2003)
