= Pierre Baehr =

French swimmer

Personal information
- Born: 14 May 1954 (age 72)

Sport
- Sport: Swimming

Pierre Baehr (born 14 May 1954) is a French former backstroke swimmer. He competed in two events at the 1972 Summer Olympics.
