= Julia Behr =

German artist

Julia Behr (fl. 1865–1890s) was a Berlin-born artist who settled in Britain and exhibited portrait paintings on a regular basis during the last quarter of the nineteenth century.

== Biography ==
Behr was born in Berlin and arrived in London with a letter of introduction from a Princess of Prussia. Although Behr had a book published while still a teenager, she concentrated on painting, attending art classes in both Paris and Brussels, where she exhibited a portrait of her mother. In Paris she studied under Ary Scheffer. Her portraits which were often of literary subjects, including some which were full life-size, received critical praise. In 1864 she showed the painting Little Crown Maker at the Berlin Exhibition. Between 1865 and 1874, Behr exhibited a number of works at commercial galleries in London. Her Portrait of General Kupka's Wife was shown in Brussels during 1869. She had at least three works shown at the Royal Academy in London during 1873 and 1874. Behe also exhibited at the Society of British Artists, the Royal Hibernian Academy and, in 1876, with the Society of Women Artists. The previous year Behr showed a portrait of a Medemoiselle Patteau in Brussels.
