= Matthias Behr =

German foil fencer

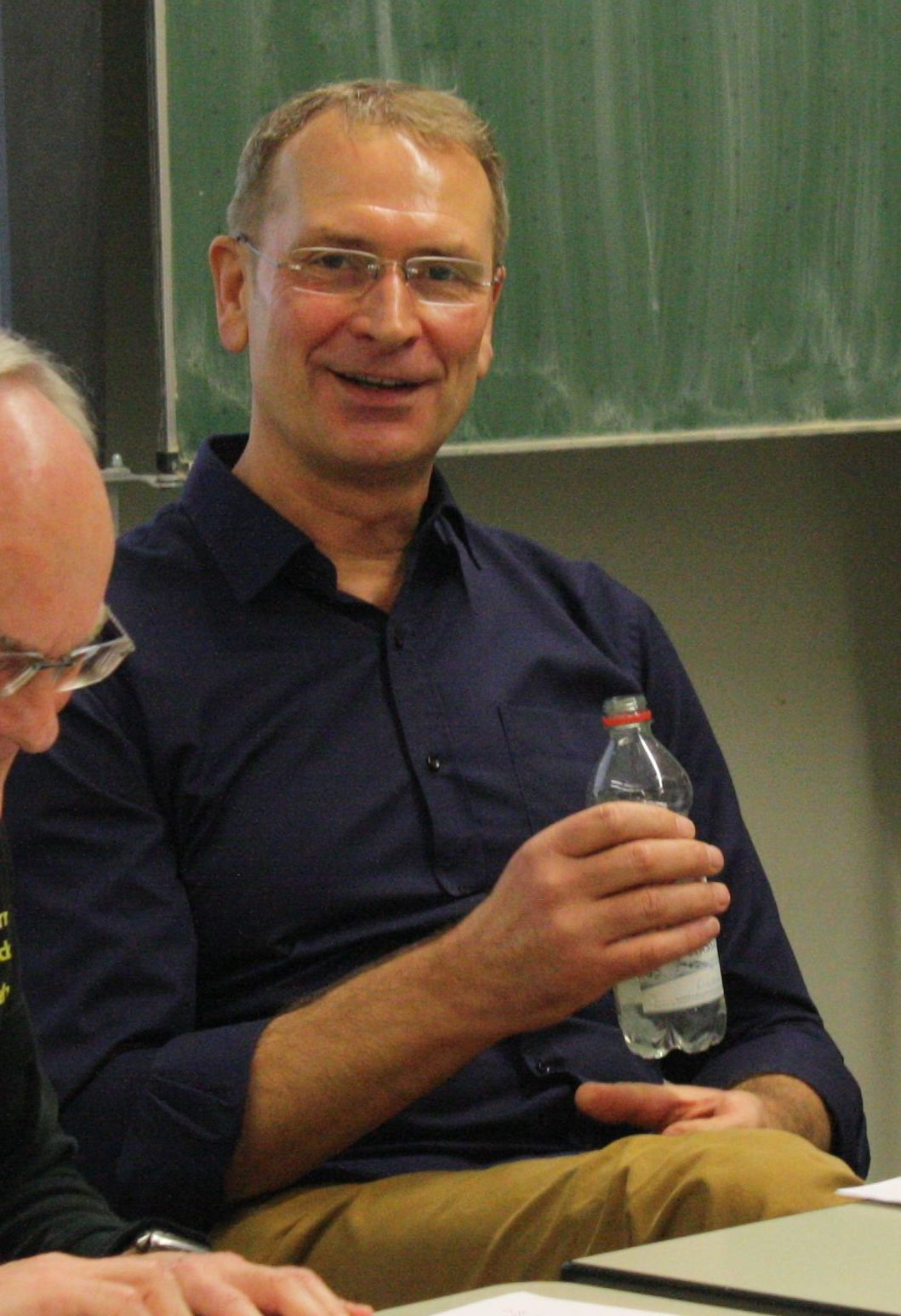
- Matthias Behr at an interview in Tauberbischofsheim (2016)

Personal information
- Born: 1 April 1955 (age 71) Tauberbischofsheim, West Germany

Sport
- Sport: Fencing
Medal record
Men's fencing
Representing West Germany
Olympic Games
Gold medal – first place	1976 Montréal	Foil, team
Silver medal – second place	1984 Los Angeles	Foil, team
Silver medal – second place	1984 Los Angeles	Foil, individual
Silver medal – second place	1988 Seoul	Foil, team

Matthias Behr (born 1 April 1955 in Tauberbischofsheim, Baden-Württemberg) is a former German foil fencer. He won a gold medal and three silvers at three Olympic Games.

== Biography ==
Matthias Behr attended the Kaufmännische Schule Tauberbischofsheim and fought for the Fencing-Club Tauberbischofsheim. Matthias Behr is married to the former foil fencer Zita Funkenhauser. After termination of his career as a competitive athlete, he became principal of the part-time boarding school at the Olympic base of Tauberbischofsheim.

During his career as a fencer, he was part of a group of foil fencers from Tauberbischofsheim, or from the competitive centre there, who dominated their field nationally and internationally for almost 15 years.

On 19 July 1982, Matthias Behr, and foil fencing in general, became widely known outside of those interested in the sport when, at the world championship in Rome, Behr's blade broke and struck incumbent world champion Vladimir Smirnov in the eye, leading to Smirnov's death nine days later.

Forty years later, amidst the Russian invasion of Ukraine, Behr called Smirnov's former wife in Ukraine, and gave her son-in-law and two grandchildren refuge during the war.

Matthias Behr was one of the close confidants of Emil Beck and became his successor as team leader of the National German Fencing Team.

== Singles successes ==
- 1984 Silver Summer Olympics, Los Angeles
- 1987 Silver FIE World Championships in Fencing, Lausanne

== Team successes ==
- 1973 Silver FIE World Championships in Fencing, Gothenburg
- 1976 Gold Summer Olympics, Montreal
- 1977 Gold FIE World Championships in Fencing, Buenos Aires
- 1979 Bronze FIE World Championships in Fencing, Melbourne
- 1981 Bronze FIE World Championships in Fencing, Clermont-Ferrand
- 1983 Gold FIE World Championships in Fencing, Vienna
- 1984 Silver Summer Olympics, Los Angeles
- 1985 Silver FIE World Championships in Fencing, Barcelona
- 1986 Silver FIE World Championships in Fencing, Sofia
- 1987 Gold World Championships, Lausanne
- 1988 Silver Summer Olympics, Seoul

== Awards ==
- Silbernes Lorbeerblatt
