= Mathias Bähr =

German neurologist (born 1960)

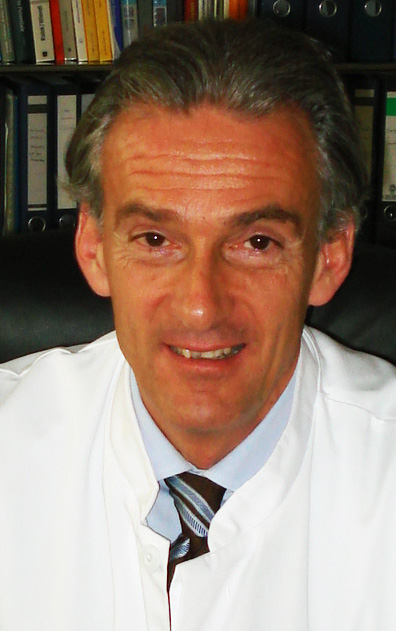
Bähr in August 2016

Mathias Bähr (born 1960) is a German professor,doctor of medical sciences,neurologist. https://nachrichten.idw-online.de/2001/04/19/prof-mathias-baehr-neuer-leiter-abteilung-neurologie-bereich-humanmedizin-uni-goettingen

== Career ==
Mathias Bähr joined the Medical School in Tübingen, in the South of Germany, where he passed his Medical Licensing Examination in 1985. He obtained his MD in neuropathology at the Institute for Brain Research Tübingen in 1986 supervised by the late Prof. Jürgen Peiffer. For his initial training in Neurology he moved to the Department of Neurology at the University Hospital Düsseldorf (with Prof. H.J.Freund). In 1987 he obtained a Research Fellowship from the German Research Council (DFG) for which he joined the Max Planck Institute for Developmental Biology in Tübingen (with Prof. F. Bonhoeffer). In 1988 a Max-Planck-Fellowship was granted and allowed him to join the Group of the late Prof. R.P. Bunge (Department of Neurobiology) at the Washington University in St. Louis . Back in Tübingen in 1989 he continued his training in Neurology at the University Hospital Tübingen (with Prof. J.Dichgans) and built up his own research group at the Max Planck Institute for Developmental Biology with a research group award. In the following years he completed his training in Neurology, obtained his qualification as a University Lecturer (Habilitation) and was awarded with a Professorship from the Schilling-Foundation. After acting as a Senior Consultant and associated Professor in Tübingen he became Head of the Department of Neurology and Full Professor at the University Medicine Göttingen in 2001. Mathias Bähr’s major research interests concentrate on the cellular and molecular basis of de- and regeneration in the adult CNS and the development of neuro-protective treatment strategies for CNS disorders like trauma, multiple sclerosis, Parkinson’s disease, or ALS. He was one of the spokespersons of the DFG-Research Center ‚Molecular Physiology of the Brain’ (CMPB) and the Cluster of Excellence ‚Nanoscale Microscopy and Molecular Physiology of the Brain’ (CNMPB) and is member of the Excellence Cluster ‘Multiscale Bioimaging’ (https://mbexc.de). He is Speaker of the European Neuroscience Institute (ENI-G; https://www.eni.gwdg.de). Mathias Bähr has published more than 500 articles in peer-reviewed journals (H-index 92).

== Memberships and offices ==
- Member of the German Academy of Science Leopoldina
- Board member of the Gertrud Reemtsma-Foundation
- Board Member of the German-Israeli-Foundation (GIF; 2007–2015)
- Fellow of the Royal Academy of Physicians, London, UK
- President of the German Society for Neuroscience (2007–2009)
- Member of the Academy of Sciences and Humanities Göttingen, Germany
- Member of the Board/Committee of the Neuroscientific Website dasGehirn.info
- Member of the Board of Directors of the German Centre for Neurodegenerative Diseases (DZNE), Göttingen, Germany
- Speaker of European Neuroscience Institute, Göttingen, Germany
- Speaker of the Cluster of Excellence Center for Nanoscale Microscopy and Molecular Physiology of the Brain (CNMPB), Göttingen, Germany (until 2019)
- Editor of Molecular and Cellular Neuroscience (MCN)
- Section Editor Experimental Neurology

== Honours and awards ==
- Attempto Award, University of Tübingen
- Award of the Hannelore Kohl Foundation
- Hermann and Lilly Schilling-Foundation Professorship
- Heinrich-Pette-Award, German Society for Neurology
- Young Investigator Research Award, Ministry of Science, Research and Art of the Federal State Baden-Württemberg, Germany

== Publications (selection) ==
- Kilic E, Dietz GPH, Herrmann DM and Bähr M (2002): Intravenous TAT-Bcl-XL is protective when delivered before and after middle cerebral artery occlusion in mice. In: Annals of Neurology. 52(5):617–22.
- Diem R, Sättler MB, Merkler D, Demmer I, Maier K, Stadelmann C, Ehrenreich H, Bähr M (2005): Combined therapy with methylprednisolone and erythropoietin in a model of multiple sclerosis. In: Brain. 128:375–85.
- Doeppner TR, Bretschneider E, Doehring M, Segura I, Sentürk A, Acker-Palmer A, Hasan MR, Elali A, Hermann DM and Bähr M (2011): Enhancement of endogenous neurogenesis in ephrin-B3 deficient mice after transient focal cerebral ischemia. In: Acta Neuropathologica. 122(4):429–42.
- Sühs KW, Hein K, Sättler MB, Görlitz A, Ciupka C, Scholz K, Käsmann-Kellner B, Papanagiotou P, Schäffler N, Restemeyer C, Bittersohl D, Hassenstein A, Seitz B, Reith W, Fassbender K, Hilgers R, Heesen C, Bähr M, Diem R. (2012): A randomized, double-blind, phase 2 study of erythropoietin in optic neuritis. Ann Neurol. Aug;72(2):199–210.
- With Michael Frotscher (2003):, Stuttgart.
