= Anja Fichtel =

German fencer (born 1968)

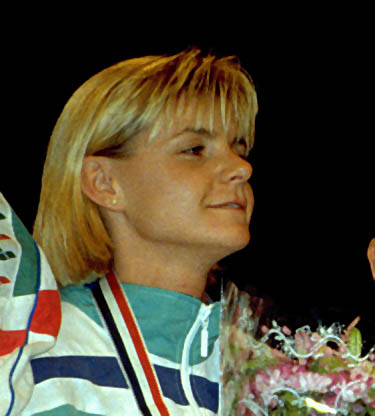
- Anja Fichtel in 1995

Personal information
- Born: 17 August 1968 (age 57) Tauberbischofsheim, West Germany
- Height: 1.75 m (5 ft 9 in)
- Weight: 62 kg (137 lb)

Sport
- Sport: Fencing
- Club: FC Tauberbischofsheim
Medal record
Representing Germany
Women's Fencing
Olympic Games
| Gold medal – first place | 1988 Seoul | foil, ind, |
| Gold medal – first place | 1988 Seoul | foil, team |
| Silver medal – second place | 1992 Barcelona | foil, team |
| Bronze medal – third place | 1996 Atlanta | foil, team |
World Fencing Championships
| Gold medal – first place | 1986 World Fencing Championships | foil, ind, |
| Gold medal – first place | 1989 World Fencing Championships | foil, team |
| Gold medal – first place | 1990 World Fencing Championships | foil, ind, |
| Gold medal – first place | 1993 World Fencing Championships | foil, team |
| Silver medal – second place | 1989 World Fencing Championships | foil, ind, |

Anja Fichtel-Mauritz (born 17 August 1968, née Fichtel) is a retired German foil fencer. At the 1988 Summer Olympics in Seoul, she won in the individual and team competitions, and she won the individual competition of the World Championship in 1986 and 1990. She was winner of the World Championships in 1985, 1989, 1993 as a member of the national German team and second in team competition at the 1992 Summer Olympics. From 1986 until 1996 Fichtel held the title of German champion.

== Biography ==
Anja Fichtel attended the Kaufmännische Schule Tauberbischofsheim and fought for the Fencing-Club Tauberbischofsheim.

Fichtel is remembered not just for her many victories, but also for her vigorous fencing style. As Elena Grishina, the Soviet fencer, recalls:

The appearance of Anja Fichtel in foil fencing has drastically changed our view on that type of weapon. Earlier the foil fencers would exchange technical tricks for a long while, using parries and counter-parries, attacks with multiple riposte and parat riposte, attacks with multiple binds and disengagements. Anja used to advance with three quick balestra, then stepped back, forcing her opponent to come closer, then she threw her arm above her head and vigorously attacked with a large lunge, making it almost half-size of the strip. She would aim the hit either at the shoulder or the back of competitor, and there was practically no chance to avoid it.

In 1990, she won the "Russian Cup," an international tournament in foil fencing for women held in Moscow, where the highest award was reserved for the foil fencer who did not lose a single bout. A year later, she again won the same cup.

Seven weeks before the Olympics in Barcelona, Anja gave birth to her son Lauren. She followed her husband Merten Mauritz to Austria and changed her name to Fichtel-Mauritz. She still represented Germany at the team Olympics and took second place behind the Italian team.

The Russians met Fichtel in Moscow in 1993. At the “Russian Cup”, she lost to Diana Bianchedi and took second place. In March 1997, she announced her retirement, and in October of the same year she gave birth to her second baby, and in 2007 her third child was born. Her elder son Lauren has also taken up fencing.

== Palmarès ==
1985 Junior World Fencing Championships, foil, individual and team
1986 World Fencing Championships, foil, individual
1988 Junior World Fencing Championships, foil, individual
1988 Olympic Games, foil, individual and team
1989 World Fencing Championships, foil, individual
1989 World Fencing Championships, foil, team
1990 World Fencing Championships, foil, individual
1992 Olympic Games, foil, team
1993 World Fencing Championships, foil, team
