= Tauberbischofsheim Fencing Club =

Fencing team based in Tauberbischofsheim, Germany

FC Tauberbischofsheim
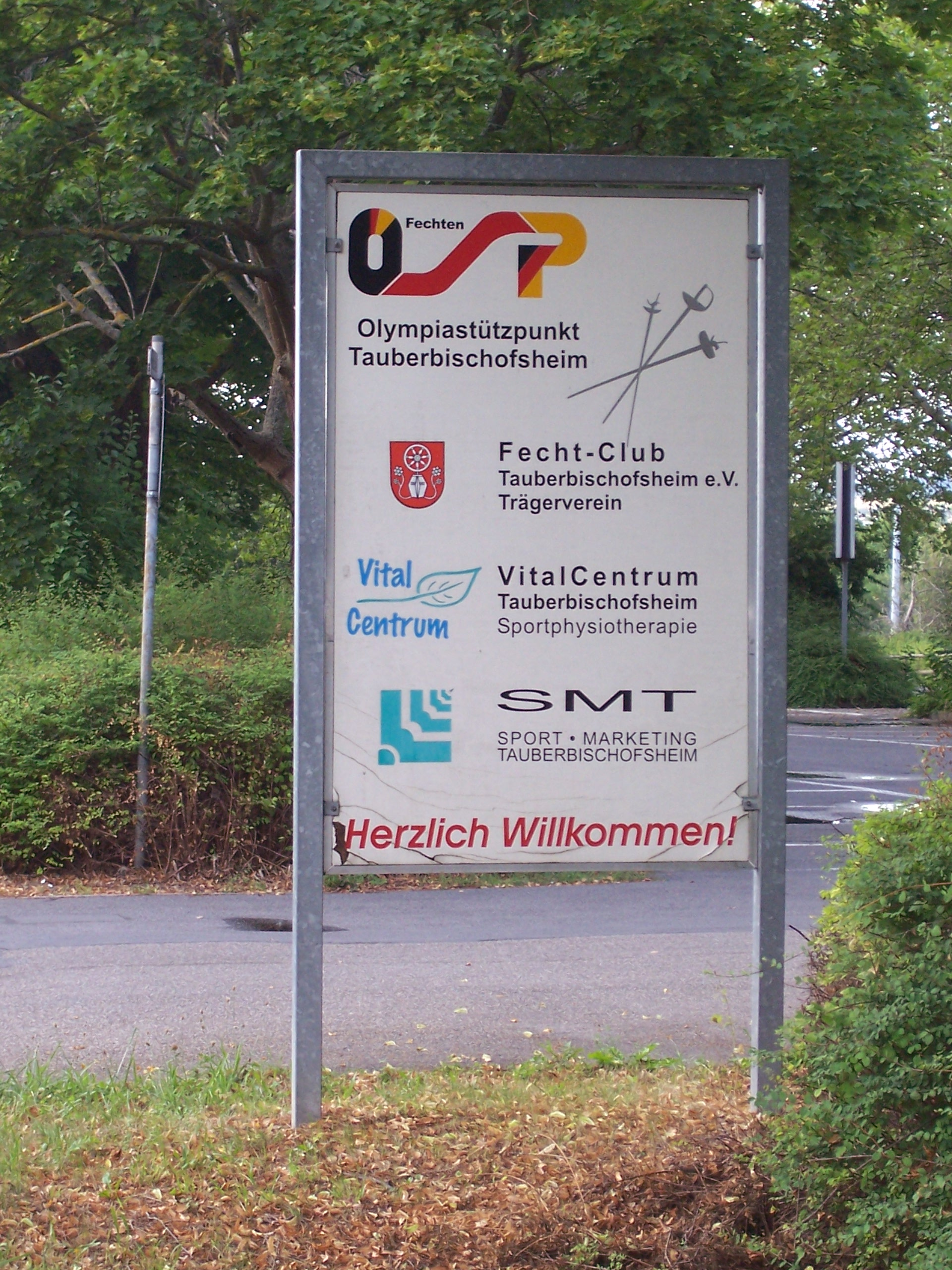
- Full name: Fencing-Club Tauberbischofsheim e. V.
- Nicknames: FC TBB
- Sport: Fencing
- Founded: 1954
- Based in: Tauberbischofsheim
- Website: www.fechtentbb.de

The Tauberbischofsheim Fencing Club (in German Fecht-Club Tauberbischofsheim eingetragener Verein; commonly known as FC Tauberbischofsheim e. V.) is a fencing club based in Tauberbischofsheim, Baden-Württemberg, Germany. Tauberbischofsheim fencers have earned more than 300 medals in international sporting events.

== History ==
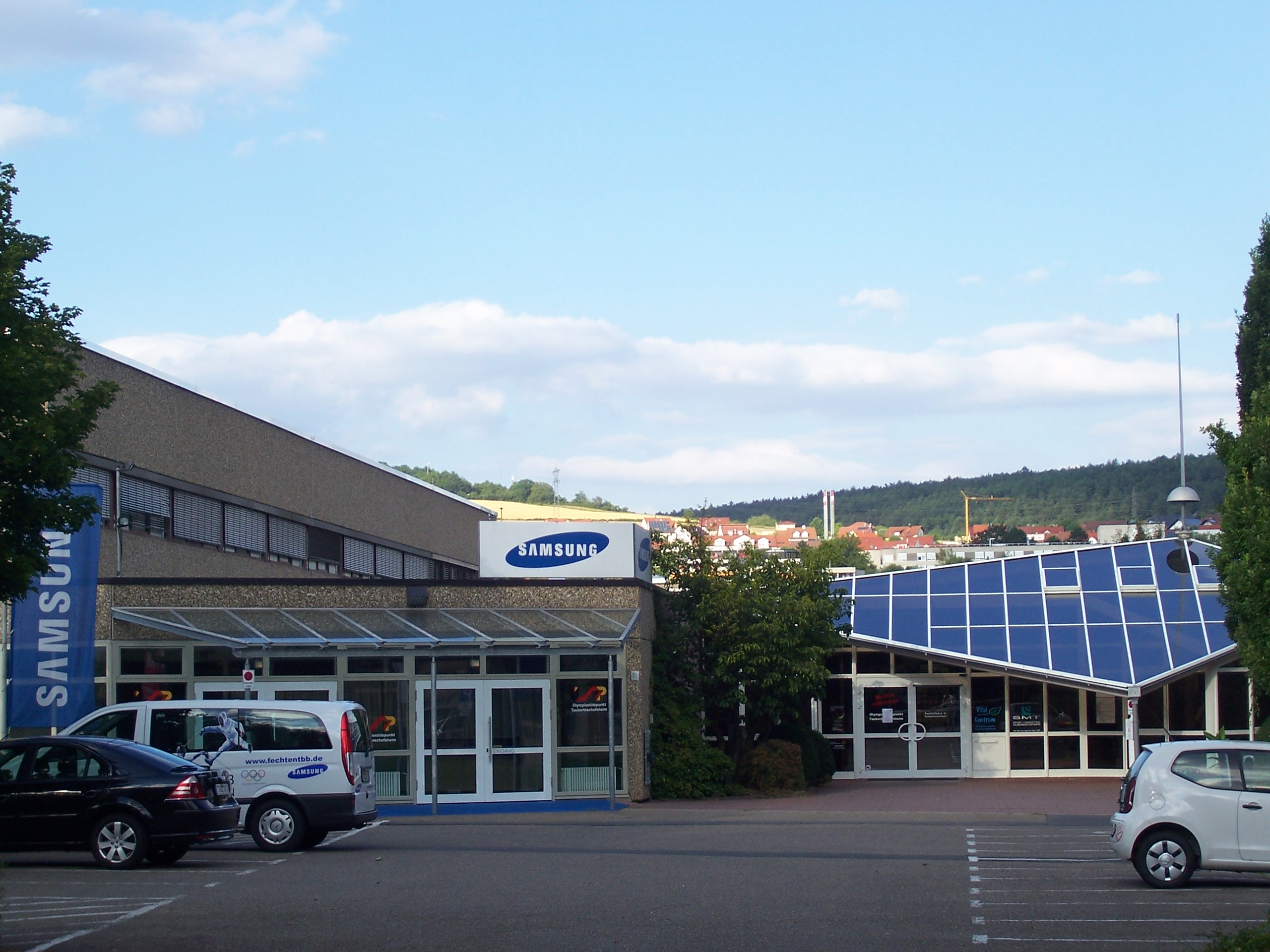
Entrance of the Fencing-Club Tauberbischofheim's training camp

=== Prehistory ===
On 12 October 1954 – at the initiative of Emil Beck at the "Gasthaus zum Schwanen" – a fencing division in the Club TSV 1863 Tauberbischofsheim e.V. was founded. First trainings were held in the auditorium of the old high school, later in the gym of the high school and the newly built festival hall in Tauberbischofsheim. In 1955, the first public club tournament was in the "Gasthaus zur Bretze". In 1958, the first fencing piste was purchased.

=== Founding and construction of the Club ===
On June 30, 1967, the fencing division left the TSV 1863 Tauberbischofsheim. On 14 October 1967, the official founding meeting of the Fencing-Club Tauberbischofsheim took place in the "Raststätte Block". In 1972 and 1976, new staff rooms, fencing arenas, boarding rooms, and training rooms opened. In the same year, Tauberbischofsheimer fencers won the first gold medals at Olympic Games. In 1983, a new fencing hall was built with 18 fencing pistes and fitness rooms.

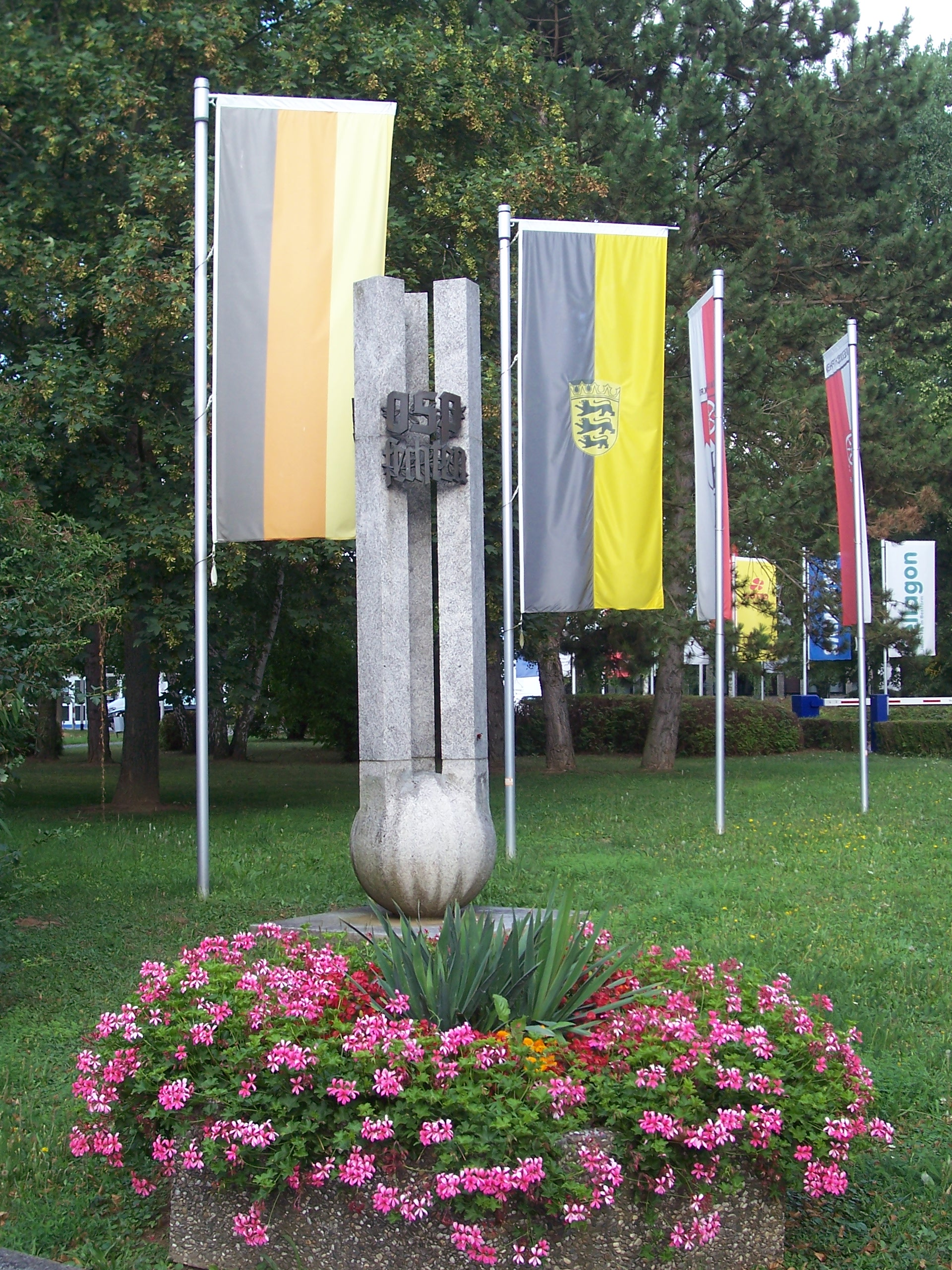
A Sculpture at the Olympic team's training camp Tauberbischofsheim

=== Founding of the Olympic team's training camp ===
In 1986, the Fencing-Club Tauberbischofsheim was part of a newly established Olympic team's training camp Tauberbischofsheim (in German Olympiastützpunkt (OSP) Tauberbischofsheim) for the sport of Fencing in Tauberbischofsheim. In 1988, the sport boarding school "Berghof" opened. In 2002, the Vital-Centre was established.

=== Anniversaries ===
In 2007, the Fencing-Club Tauberbischofsheim celebrated its 40th anniversary. In 2011, the 25th anniversary of the Olympic team's training camp Tauberbischofsheim was celebrated.

== Honours ==
Over 380 medals at Olympic Games and Paralympics, World Championships and European Championships and over 655 medals at German National Championships emphasise the dominant position that the Fencing-Club Tauberbischofsheim holds within international fencing (point in time: June 2016):

=== Olympic Games and Paralympics ===
Medals of the Fencing-Club Tauberbischofsheim at Olympic Games and Paralympics:

Medals	Singles	Team	Whole
gold	3	6	9
silver	8	9	17
bronze	6	8	14
whole	17	23	40

=== World Championships ===
Medals of the Fencing-Club Tauberbischofsheim at World Championships:

Medals	Singles	Team	Whole
gold	10	16	26
silver	22	27	49
bronze	16	23	39
whole	48	66	114

Medals of the Fencing-Club Tauberbischofsheim at Junior World Championships:

Medals	Singles	Team	Whole
gold	13	7	20
silver	14	5	19
bronze	13	13	26
whole	40	25	65

Medals of the Fencing-Club Tauberbischofsheim at Cadet World Championships:

Medals	Singles
gold	7
silver	9
bronze	15
whole	31

=== European Championships ===
Medals of the Fencing-Club Tauberbischofsheim at European Championships:

Medals	Singles	Team	Whole
gold	17	11	28
silver	15	10	25
bronze	22	14	37
whole	53	36	90

Medals of the Fencing-Club Tauberbischofsheim at Junior European Championships:

Medals	Singles	Team	Whole
gold	8	5	13
silver	4	6	10
bronze	12	6	18
whole	24	17	41

=== German National Championships ===
The fencers of the FC Tauberbischofsheim won 655 medals at German National Championships (point in time: 2012).

== Outstanding personalities ==
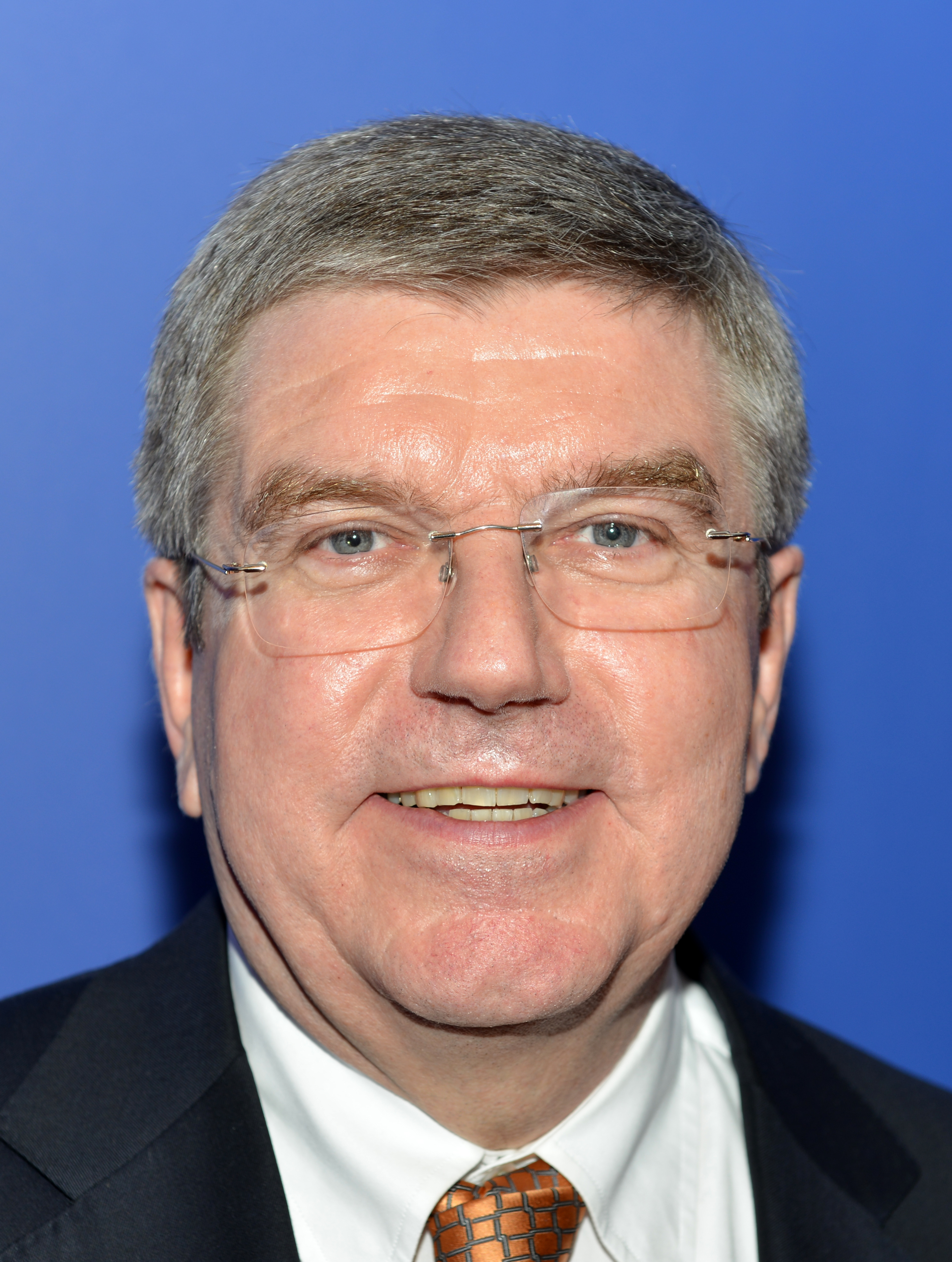
Thomas Bach, the former president of the IOC, is a former fencer of the FC Tauberbischofsheim

=== Former Athletes ===
- Thomas Bach, a German former fencer and Olympic Champion, the ninth president of the IOC.
- Anja Fichtel, is a German fencer, 14-time medalist at Olympic Games and World Fencing Championships, Winner of the Silver Laurel Leaf, Voted "female fencer of the 20th century".
- Alexander Pusch, several time medalist at Olympic Games and World Championships, Winner of the Silver Laurel Leaf, Voted "male fencer of the 20th century".

=== Former Coaches ===
- Emil Beck, "Founding father" of the Fencing-Club Tauberbischofsheim, a German fencing coach who created a school of fencing sometimes referred to as the "German school" since Beck's influence on German fencing was profound. As a fencing coach, Beck was largely self-taught. Considering Beck's medal success, he is one of the most successful coaches in the world (163 medals at Olympic Games, World Championships and European Championships). Beck coined the reputation of the Fencing-Club Tauberbischofsheim in the 1970s as "Tauberbischofsheimer goldsmith" and "Mecca of fencing".

== Medallists ==
The following fencers – who started for the Fencing-Club Tauberbischofsheim – won gold, silver, and bronze medals at Olympic Games, Paralympics, World Championships, and European Championships (point in time: October 2015):

A

Norman Ackermann, Christian Adrians.

B

Thomas Bach, Sebastian Bachmann, Maria Bartkowski, Uwe Bartmann, Sabine Bau, Simone Bauer, Frank Beck, Thorsten Becker, Manfred Beckmann, Dominik Behr, Matthias Behr, Reinhold Behr, Elmar Beierstettel, Reinhard Berger, Sandra Bingenheimer, Elke Birthelmer, Sabine Bischoff, Claudia Bokel, Elmar Borrmann, Rico Braun.

C

Roman Christen, Beate Christmann.

D

Annette Dobmeier, Annekathrin Donath.

E

Leonie Ebert, Ulrich Eifler, Thomas Endres.

F

Robert Felisiak, Anja Fichtel-Mauritz, Jörg Fiedler, Volker Fischer, Michael Flegler, Sebastian Flegler, Tobias Frank, Zita Funkenhauser, Hedwig Funkenhauser.

G

Stefanie Geiger, Michael Gerull, Thomas Gerull, Mathias Gey, Karin Gießelmann, Carolin Golubytskyi, Matthias Grimm.

H

Yvonne Haag, Viola Haenlein, Doreen Häntzsch, Gerhard Heer, Jürgen Hehn, Harald Hein, Isabell Hertlein, Denis Holzkamp, Stefan Hörger, Björn Hübner, Jacek Huchwajda, Rosalia Huszti.

J

Hanns Jana.

K

Barbara Kasperska, Wolfgang Kempf, Martin Kindt, Johannes Klebes, Benjamin Kleibrink, Annette Klug, Jochen Knies, Johannes Kobsik, Susanne König, Rita König, Melanie Kura.

L

Susanne Lang, Tobias Link, Wilfried Lipinski, Carsten Lotter, Gudrun Lotter, Natascha Lotter.

M

Maximilian Mutze.

N

Carolin Neckermann, Rafael Nickel.

O

Patrycia Osyczkav.

P

Alexander Pusch.

R

Jan-Erich Rauhaus, Markus Reiter, Wladimir Reznitschenko, Hannah Roder, Uwe Römer, Alexander Rüdinger, Luisa Ruppert.

S

Anja Schache, Lars Schache, Ute Schaeper, Gesine Schiel, Sven Schmid, Arnd Schmitt, Ulrich Schmitt, Martin Schmitt, Ulrich Schreck, Silke Schwarz, Erk Sens-Gorius, Etelka Sike, Waltraut Stollwerck, Daniel Strigel, Mariusz Strzalka.

U

Samuel Unterhauser.

W

Katja Wächter, Udo Wagner, Alexander Weber, Esther Weber, Thorsten Weidner, Benjamin Weinkauf, Ingo Weißenborn, Martin Wendel, André Weßels, Steffen Wiesinger, Rhena Wolf.

Z

Boris Zorc.

== Media ==
The Fencing-Club Tauberbischofsheim uses the following communication channels to publish its informations: a website, a Facebook page and a YouTube channel.
