= Harry Bähre =

German footballer

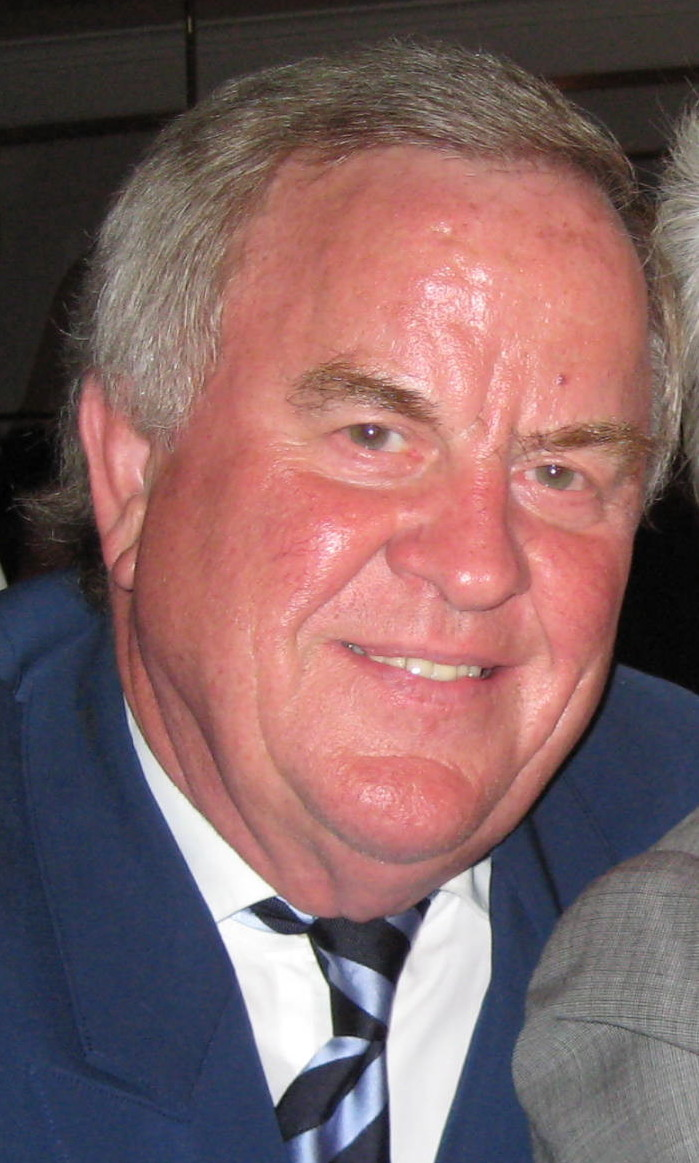
- Harry Bähre (2008)

Personal information
- Date of birth: 22 July 1941 (age 85)
- Place of birth: Germany
- Position: Midfielder

Senior career*
| Years | Team | Apps | (Gls) |
| 1963–1967 | Hamburger SV | 78 | (2) |
| 1967–1970 | HSV Barmbek-Uhlenhorst | | |
- * Club domestic league appearances and goals

Harry Bähre (born 22 July 1941) is a former German footballer.

He played for Hamburger SV in the Bundesliga from 1963 to 1967, scoring two goals in 78 games. In 1963, when the Bundesliga was founded the Hamburger SV sent the licence documents very early to the German Football Association and so Bähre got the licence number 001.
