= Pakistan national field hockey team results (1970–1979) =

== Competitive record ==
- Win Draw Loss

Year	Competition	Location(s)	Venue(s)	GP	W	D	L	GF	GA	Result
1970	Test series vs Kenya	(Kenya)	Nairobi	2	1	0	1	3	1	Winners
1970	1970 Asian Games	(Thailand)	Bangkok	5	4	1	0	19	0	1st
1971	1971 FIH Hockey World Cup	(Spain)	Barcelona	6	4	1	1	14	9	1st
1971	Test match vs Netherlands	(Netherlands)	Amstelveen	1	0	0	1	1	3	Lost
1972	Tour of Netherlands & Poland	(Netherlands) (Poland)	Arnhem, Amstelveen, Warsaw	4	3	0	1	12	6	-
1972	1972 Summer Olympics	(West Germany)	Munich	9	7	0	2	19	7	2nd
1973	Test series vs Spain	(Spain)	Barcelona	2	1	1	0	6	3	Winners
1973	Test series vs Belgium	(Belgium)	Brussels	2	2	0	0	7	2	Winners
1973	1973 FIH Hockey World Cup	(Spain)	Amstelveen	7	4	1	2	16	7	4th
1974	Test series vs Australia	(Australia)	Melbourne, Canberra, Tamworth Brisbane, Invercargill	5	3	1	1	11	9	Winners
1974	Seven Nations Christchurch	(New Zealand)	Christchurch	6	6	0	0	21	3	1st
1974	1974 Asian Games	(Iran)	Tehran	6	5	1	0	37	1	1st
1975	Test series vs Australia	(Pakistan)	Rawalpindi, Lahore, Karachi Hyderabad	4	1	3	0	7	4	Winners
1975	1975 FIH Hockey World Cup	(Malaysia)	Kuala Lumpur	7	2	4	1	20	9	2nd
1975	Pre-Olympics Montreal	(Canada)	Montreal	5	3	0	2	16	9	2nd
1975	Test match vs Egypt	(Egypt)	TBD	1	1	0	0	5	0	-
1976	Test series vs West Germany	(Pakistan)	Rawalpindi, Lahore, Karachi	3	3	0	0	12	7	Winners
1976	1976 Summer Olympics	(Canada)	Montreal	6	4	1	1	20	10	3rd
1976	Quaid-e-Azman Centenary Hockey Tournament	(Pakistan)	Lahore	6	6	0	0	31	3	1st
1978	Test match vs Japan	(Pakistan)	TBD	1	1	0	0	4	0	Winners
1978	Test series vs India	(India) (Pakistan)	Bombay, Bangalore, Karachi Lahore	4	3	0	1	12	5	Winners
1978	1978 FIH Hockey World Cup	(Argentina)	Buenos Aires	8	8	0	0	35	4	1st
1978	1978 Hockey Champions Trophy	(Pakistan)	Lahore	4	4	0	0	15	5	1st
1978	1978 Asian Games	(Thailand)	Bangkok	5	5	0	0	34	2	1st
1979	Esanda International Hockey Perth	(Australia)	Perth	6	6	0	0	33	8	1st
1979	Test series vs Egypt	(Egypt)	TBD	2	2	0	0	9	0	Winners
1979	Test series vs Netherlands	(Netherlands)	Groningen, Amstelveen, Utrecht Rotterdam, Eindhoven	6	2	1	3	19	20	Lost

== Results ==
=== 1970 ===
23 August 1970

Kenya	0 - 3	Pakistan
	Report	Ashfaq 18'; Rashid Jr. 51', 56'

Nairobi, Kenya

Event: Test series
First Test match

28 August 1970

Kenya	1 - 0	Pakistan
Jagjeet 50'	Report

Nairobi, Kenya

Event: Test series
First Test match

29 August 1970

Kenya	Match abandoned	Pakistan
	Report

Nairobi, Kenya

Event: Test series
Third Test match

Note Match was abandoned after 51 minutes due to crowd trouble and riot Pakistan was leading 0-1.

12 December 1970

Pakistan	3 - 0	Japan
	Report

Bangkok, Thailand

Event: 1970 Asian Games
Pool match

13 December 1970

Pakistan	10 - 0	Hong Kong
	Report

Bangkok, Thailand

Event: 1970 Asian Games
Pool match

15 December 1970

Thailand	0 - 0	Pakistan
	Report

Bangkok, Thailand

Event: 1970 Asian Games
Pool match

17 December 1970

Pakistan	5 - 0	Malaysia
	Report

Bangkok, Thailand

Event: 1970 Asian Games
Semifinal

19 December 1970

Pakistan	1 - 0 (a.e.t.)	India
	Report

Bangkok, Thailand

Event: 1970 Asian Games
Final

=== 1971 ===
15 October 1971

Pakistan	5 - 2	Australia
Dar 12', 39', 54'; Asad 24'; Rashid Jr. 41'	Report	Parry 20'; Smart 65'

Barcelona, Spain

Event: 1971 FIH Hockey World Cup
Pool match

16 October 1971

Japan	0 - 1	Pakistan
	Report	Dar 59'

Barcelona, Spain

Event: 1971 FIH Hockey World Cup
Pool match

17 October 1971

Pakistan	3 - 3	Netherlands
Dar 8', 43', 62'	Report	Spits 13', 48'; Litjens 65'

Barcelona, Spain

Event: 1971 FIH Hockey World Cup
Pool match

18 October 1971

Spain	3 - 2	Pakistan
Amat 20', 53'; Salles 44'	Report	Dar 27'; Rashid Jr. 67'

Barcelona, Spain

Event: 1971 FIH Hockey World Cup
Pool match

22 October 1971

India	1 - 2	Pakistan
Rajwinder 40'	Report	Rashid Jr. 29'; Zaman 56'

Barcelona, Spain

Event: 1971 FIH Hockey World Cup
Semifinal

24 October 1971

Pakistan	1 - 0	Spain
Islam 26'	Report

Barcelona, Spain

Event: 1973 FIH Hockey World Cup
Final

31 October 1971

Netherlands	3 - 1	Pakistan
Litjens 4'; Spits 41', 54'	Report	Asghar 47'

Amstelveen, Netherlands

Event: Test match

=== 1972 ===
7 August 1972

Netherlands	2 - 4	Pakistan
Kruize 30', 50'	Report	Rashid Jr. 8'; Dar 25'; Asad 40'; Islahuddin 55'

Arnhem, Netherlands

Event: Test series
First test match

8 August 1972

Netherlands	1 - 3	Pakistan
Kruize 53'	Report	Dar 2'; Shahnaz 19', 33'

Arnhem, Netherlands

Event: Test series
Second test match

10 August 1972

Netherlands	2 - 2	Pakistan
Kruize 18'; Zweerts 31'	Report	Saeed 23', 66'

Amstelveen, Netherlands

Event: Test series
Third test match

13 August 1972

Poland	1 - 3	Pakistan
	Report	Rashid Jr. 29'; Munawwar 48'; Saeed 60'

Warsaw, Poland

Event: Test match

27 August 1972

Pakistan	3 - 0	France
Saeed 19', 61'; Rashid Jr. 51'	Report

Munich, West Germany

Event: 1972 Summer Olympics
Pool match

28 August 1972

Pakistan	1 - 1	Spain
Munawwar 5'	Report	Fábregas 41'

Munich, West Germany

Event: 1972 Summer Olympics
Pool match

29 August 1972

Pakistan	3 - 1	Uganda
Akhtar 13'; Asghar 23'; Shahnaz 64'	Report	Sandhu 38'

Munich, West Germany

Event: 1972 Summer Olympics
Pool match

31 August 1972

West Germany	2 - 1	Pakistan
Baumgart 36'; Krause 57'	Report	Munawwar 58'

Munich, West Germany

Event: 1972 Summer Olympics
Pool match

1 September 1972

Pakistan	3 - 1	Argentina
Rashid Jr. 17', 53'; Asad 48'	Report	Sabbione 45'

Munich, West Germany

Event: 1972 Summer Olympics
Pool match

3 September 1972

Malaysia	0 - 3	Pakistan
	Report	Munawwar 28'; Rashid Jr. 61'; Saeed 67'

Munich, West Germany

Event: 1972 Summer Olympics
Pool match

4 September 1972

Belgium	1 - 3	Pakistan
Gillard 16'	Report	Munawwar 20'; Rashid Jr. 44', 46'

Munich, West Germany

Event: 1972 Summer Olympics
Pool match

8 September 1972

Pakistan	2 - 0	India
Rehman 11'; Shahnaz 34'	Report

Munich, West Germany

Event: 1972 Summer Olympics
Semifinal

10 September 1972

West Germany	1 - 0	Pakistan
Krause 60'	Report

Munich, West Germany

Event: 1972 Summer Olympics
Final

=== 1973 ===
6 August 1973

Spain	1 - 4	Pakistan
	Report

Barcelona, Spain

Event: Test series
First Test match

8 August 1973

Spain	2 - 2	Pakistan
	Report

Barcelona, Spain

Event: Test series
Second Test match

10 August 1973

Belgium	1 - 4	Pakistan
	Report

Brussels, Belgium

Event: Test series
First Test match

12 August 1973

Belgium	1 - 3	Pakistan
	Report

Brussels, Belgium

Event: Test series
Second Test match

24 August 1973

Pakistan	4 - 2	Malaysia
Laeeq 13'; Azam 31'; Samiullah 49'; Dar 58'	Report	Maria 37'; Shamuganathan 62'

Amstelveen, Netherlands

Event: 1973 Hockey World Cup
Pool match

25 August 1973

Netherlands	1 - 2	Pakistan
Kruize 32'	Report	Azam 47', 55'

Amstelveen, Netherlands

Event: 1973 FIH Hockey World Cup
Pool match

26 August 1973

Pakistan	2 - 2	England
Dar 23'; Laeeq 59'	Report	Whalley 11'; Naele 46'

Amstelveen, Netherlands

Event: 1973 FIH Hockey World Cup
Pool match

28 August 1973

Pakistan	2 - 0	Belgium
Dar 20', 57'	Report

Amstelveen, Netherlands

Event: 1973 FIH Hockey World Cup
Pool match

29 August 1973

Pakistan	6 - 0	Argentina
Dar 6', 40', 54'; Abbas 24'; Laeeq 51'; Samiullah 64'	Report

Amstelveen, Netherlands

Event: 1973 FIH Hockey World Cup
Pool match

31 August 1973

India	1 - 0	Pakistan
Govinda 62'	Report

Amstelveen, Netherlands

Event: 1973 FIH Hockey World Cup
Semifinal

2 September 1973

West Germany	1 - 0	Pakistan
Krause 68'	Report

Amstelveen, Netherlands

Event: 1973 FIH Hockey World Cup
Third and fourth place

=== 1974 ===
24 January 1974

Australia	2 - 2	Pakistan
Golder 10', 26'	Report	Rasool 27'; Islahuddin 66'

Melbourne, Australia

Event: Test series
First Test match

27 January 1974

Australia	2 - 3	Pakistan
Glencross 9'; Smith 64'	Report	Islahuddin 28'; Rashid Jr. 31', 38'

Canberra, Australia

Event: Test series
Second Test match

30 January 1974

Australia	2 - 4	Pakistan
Rourke 37', 55'	Report	Rashid Jr. 16', 46'; Islahuddin 29', 54'

Tamworth, Australia

Event: Test series
Third Test match

3 February 1974

Australia	2 - 0	Pakistan
Marshall 2', 15'	Report

Brisbane, Australia

Event: Test series
Fourth Test match

6 February 1974

Australia	1 - 2	Pakistan
	Report

Invercargill, Australia

Event: Test series
Fifth Test match

9 February 1974

Pakistan	11 - 1	Canada
	Report

Christchurch, New Zealand

Event: Seven Nations Christchurch 1974
Round-robin first match

10 February 1974

Pakistan	2 - 1	Australia
Islahuddin 12'; Munawwar 34'	Report	Browning 23'

Christchurch, New Zealand

Event: Seven Nations Christchurch 1974
Round-robin second match

11 February 1974

Malaysia	0 - 2	Pakistan
	Report	Rashid Jr. 36'; Azam 42'

Christchurch, New Zealand

Event: Seven Nations Christchurch 1974
Round-robin third match

13 February 1974

Poland	1 - 2	Pakistan
Otulakowski 28'	Report	Islahuddin 45'; Zahid 57'

Christchurch, New Zealand

Event: Seven Nations Christchurch 1974
Round-robin fourth match

14 February 1974

New Zealand	0 - 2	Pakistan
	Report

Christchurch, New Zealand

Event: Seven Nations Christchurch 1974
Round-robin fifth match

16 February 1974

Pakistan	2 - 0	Netherlands
Rashid Jr. 46'; Samiullah 59'	Report

Christchurch, New Zealand

Event: Seven Nations Christchurch 1974
Round-robin sixth match

8 September 1974

Pakistan	4 - 0	Malaysia
Shahnaz 2'; Rasool 28', 34'; Manzoor Sr. 61'	Report

Tehran, Iran

Event: 1974 Asian Games
Round-robin first match

10 September 1974

Pakistan	14 - 0	Sri Lanka
Rashid Jr. 3', 18', 23', 52', 60'; Shahnaz 8', 32', 41'; Rasool 13'; Islahuddin 20', 29', 49', 67'; Samiullah 50'	Report

Tehran, Iran

Event: 1974 Asian Games
Round-robin second match

11 September 1974

Iran	0 - 13	Pakistan
	Report

Tehran, Iran

Event: 1974 Asian Games
Round-robin third match

12 September 1974

Pakistan	3 - 0	Japan
Rashid Jr. 12', 28'; Azam 56'	Report

Tehran, Iran

Event: 1974 Asian Games
Round-robin fourth match

14 September 1974

India	1 - 1	Pakistan
	Report

Tehran, Iran

Event: 1974 Asian Games
Round-robin fifth match

15 September 1974

Pakistan	2 - 0	India
Munawwar 29'; Rasool 51'	Report

Tehran, Iran

Event: 1974 Asian Games
Round-robin tie breaker

=== 1975 ===
16 February 1975

Pakistan	1 - 1	Australia
Manzoor Sr. 69'	Report	Poole 20'

Rawalpindi, Pakistan

Event: Test series
First Test match

21 February 1975

Pakistan	4 - 1	Australia
	Report

Lahore, Pakistan

Event: Test series
Second Test match

23 February 1975

Pakistan	1 - 1	Australia
	Report

Karachi, Pakistan

Event: Test series
Third Test match

25 February 1975

Pakistan	1 - 1	Australia
Rasool 46'	Report	Smith 40'

Hyderabad, Pakistan

Event: Test series
Fourth Test match

2 March 1975

Pakistan	2 - 2	Poland
Manzoor Sr. 40'; Samiullah 52'	Report	Otulakowski 4', 60'

Kuala Lumpur, Malaysia

Event: 1975 FIH Hockey World Cup
Pool match

5 March 1975

Netherlands	3 - 3	Pakistan
T. Kruize 17', 42'; Boerma 54'	Report	Manzoor Sr. 20'; Saeed 32'; Rasool 57'

Kuala Lumpur, Malaysia

Event: 1975 FIH Hockey World Cup
Pool match

6 March 1975

Pakistan	2 - 0	New Zealand
Samiullah 39'; Saeed 54'	Report

Kuala Lumpur, Malaysia

Event: 1975 FIH Hockey World Cup
Pool match

9 March 1975

Pakistan	2 - 1	Malaysia
Saeed 14'; Manzoor Sr. 68'	Report	Loke 67'

Kuala Lumpur, Malaysia

Event: 1975 FIH Hockey World Cup
Pool match

10 March 1975

Pakistan	5 - 0	Spain
Manzoor Sr. 15', 55'; Saeed 20'; Azam 41'; Samiullah 57'	Report

Kuala Lumpur, Malaysia

Event: 1975 FIH Hockey World Cup
Pool match

13 March 1975

Pakistan	5 - 1	West Germany
Samiullah 7'; Manzoor Jr. 38', 55'; Manzoor Sr. 42', 56'	Report	Drose 60'

Kuala Lumpur, Malaysia

Event: 1975 FIH Hockey World Cup
Semifinal

15 March 1975

India	2 - 1	Pakistan
Surjit 44'; Ashok 51'	Report	Zahid 17'

Kuala Lumpur, Malaysia

Event: 1975 FIH Hockey World Cup
Final

19 July 1975

Canada	1 - 6	Pakistan
	Report

Montreal, Canada

Event: Pre-Olympics Montreal Hockey Tournament 1975
Pool match

20 July 1975

Pakistan	3 - 0	Kenya
	[Report]

Montreal, Canada

Event: Pre-Olympics Montreal Hockey Tournament 1975
Pool match

22 July 1975

West Germany	3 - 2	Pakistan
	Report

Montreal, Canada

Event: Pre-Olympics Montreal Hockey Tournament 1975
Pool match

25 July 1975

Netherlands	2 - 3	Pakistan
Kruize 41'; Boerma 68'	Report	Rashid Jr. 17', 38'; Manzoor Sr. 49'

Montreal, Canada

Event: Pre-Olympics Montreal Hockey Tournament 1975
Semifinal

27 July 1975

West Germany	3 - 2	Pakistan
	Report

Montreal, Canada

Event: Pre-Olympics Montreal Hockey Tournament 1975
Final

TBD

Egypt	-/-	Pakistan
	[Record absent]

TBD, Egypt

Event: Test match

31 December 1975

Pakistan	4 - 3	West Germany
	Report

Rawalpindi, Pakistan

Event: Test series
First Test match

=== 1976 ===
4 January 1976

Pakistan	6 - 3	West Germany
	Report

Lahore, Pakistan

Event: Test series
Second Test match

6 January 1976

Pakistan	2 - 1	West Germany
	Report

Karachi, Pakistan

Event: Test series
Third Test match

18 July 1976

Pakistan	5 - 0	Belgium
Rashid Jr. 25', 36', 68'; Manzoor Jr. 52'; Munawwar 59'	Report

Montreal, Canada

Event: 1976 Summer Olympics
Pool match

19 July 1976

Spain	2 - 2	Pakistan
F. Fábregas 35'; Amat 62'	Report	Manzoor Jr. 10'; Munawwar 65'

Montreal, Canada

Event: 1976 Summer Olympics
Pool match

21 July 1976

Pakistan	4 - 2	West Germany
Munawwar 22', 32'; Manzoor Jr. 38'; Shahnaz 54'	Report	Seifert 25'; Peter 42'

Montreal, Canada

Event: 1976 Summer Olympics
Pool match

24 July 1976

Pakistan	5 - 2	New Zealand
Shahnaz 5', 32'; Munawwar 9', 39'; Hanif 14'	Report	Borren 25'; Ineson 47'

Montreal, Canada

Event: 1976 Summer Olympics
Pool match

28 July 1976

Pakistan	1 - 2	Australia
Rasool 1'	Report	Riley 32'; Irvine 59'

Montreal, Canada

Event: 1976 Summer Olympics
Semifinal

30 July 1976

Netherlands	2 - 3	Pakistan
Litjens 33', 58'	Report	Rasool 14'; Hanif 53'; Manzoor Jr. 68'

Montreal, Canada

Event: 1976 Summer Olympics
Third and fourth place

13 November 1976

Pakistan	13 - 0	Egypt
	Report

Lahore, Pakistan

Event: Qauid e Azam Centenary Hockey Tournament 1976
Pool match

15 November 1976

Pakistan	3 - 1	Malaysia
	Report

Lahore, Pakistan

Event: Quaid e Azam Centenary Hockey Tournament 1976
Pool match

16 November 1976

Poland	0 - 5	Pakistan
	Report

Lahore, Pakistan

Event: Quaid e Azam Centenary Hockey Tournament 1976
Pool match

18 November 1976

Pakistan	5 - 0	India
Samiullah 14'; Manzoor Sr. 29', 53'; Munawwar 40'; Manzoor Jr. 62'	Report

Lahore, Pakistan

Event: Quaid e Azam Centenary Hockey Tournament 1976
Pool match

20 November 1976

Pakistan	3 - 1	West Germany
	Report

Lahore, Pakistan

Event: Quaid e Azam Centenary Hockey Tournament 1976
Semifinal

21 November 1976

Pakistan	2 - 1 (a.e.t.)	Netherlands
Manzoor Jr. 33', 86'	Report	Litjens 15'

Lahore, Pakistan

Event: Quaid e Azam Centenary Hockey Tournament 1976
Final

=== 1978 ===
TBD

Pakistan	-/-	Japan
	[Record absent]

TBD, Pakistan

Event: Test match

9 February 1978

India	1 - 2	Pakistan
	Report

Bombay, India

Event: Test series
First Test match

12 February 1978

India	2 - 3	Pakistan
Baskaran 21'; Philips 48'	Report	Manzoor Sr. 18'; Shahnaz 34'; Rasool 55'

Bangalore, India

Event: Test series
Second Test match

16 February 1978

Pakistan	6 - 0	India
	Report

Karachi, Pakistan

Event: Test series
Third Test match

19 February 1978

Pakistan	1 - 2	India
	Report

Lahore, Pakistan

Event: Test series
Fourth Test match

21 March 1978

Pakistan	9 - 0	Ireland
Islahuddin 8', 19'; Shahnaz 14', 33', 63'; Samiullah 27', 70'; Hanif 24'; Ehsanullah 42'	Report

Buenos Aires, Argentina

Event: 1978 FIH Hockey World Cup
Pool match

22 March 1978

Pakistan	7 - 0	Italy
Munawwar 5', 24', 28'; Islahuddin 57'; Shahnaz 60'; Ehsanullah 67'; Hanif 69'	Report

Buenos Aires, Argentina

Event: 1978 FIH Hockey World Cup
Pool match

25 March 1978

Netherlands	1 - 3	Pakistan
Litjens 19'	Report	Munawwar 16'; Manzoor Jr. 42'; Rasool 59'

Buenos Aires, Argentina

Event: 1978 FIH Hockey World Cup
Pool match

26 March 1978

Pakistan	3 - 0	Malaysia
Hanif 34', 47'; Islahuddin 47'	Report

Buenos Aires, Argentina

Event: 1978 FIH Hockey World Cup
Pool match

28 March 1978

Spain	1 - 2	Pakistan
Chaves 34'	Report	Shahnaz 12'; Manzoor Jr. 35'

Buenos Aires, Argentina

Event: 1978 FIH Hockey World Cup
Pool match

29 March 1978

Pakistan	7 - 0	Argentina
Manzoor Jr. 13', 24'; Munawwar 28', 30', 31'; Shahnaz 67'; Hanif 70'	Report

Buenos Aires, Argentina

Event: 1978 FIH Hockey World Cup
Pool match

31 March 1978

Pakistan	1 - 0 (a.e.t.)	West Germany
Islahuddin 83'	Report

Buenos Aires, Argentina

Event: 1978 FIH Hockey World Cup
Semifinal

2 April 1978

Pakistan	3 - 2	Netherlands
Rasool 2'; Islahuddin 46'; Ehsanullah 63'	Report	Kruize 9'; Litjens 40'

Buenos Aires, Argentina

Event: 1978 FIH Hockey World Cup
Final

17 November 1978

Pakistan	6 - 2	New Zealand
Shahnaz 18', 55'; Sherwani 29'; Rasool 49'; Hanif 56', 66'	Report

Lahore, Pakistan

Event: 1978 Hockey Champions Trophy
Round-robin first match

20 November 1978

Spain	1 - 3	Pakistan
	Report

Lahore, Pakistan

Event: 1978 Hockey Champions Trophy
Round-robin second match

21 November 1978

Pakistan	4 - 1	Great Britain
	Report

Lahore, Pakistan

Event: 1978 Hockey Champions Trophy
Round-robin third match

24 November 1978

Pakistan	2 - 1	Australia
Shahnaz 55'; Manzoor Jr. 61'	Report	Dick 68'

Lahore, Pakistan

Event: 1978 Hockey Champions Trophy

Round-robin fourth match

11 December 1978

Pakistan	2 - 0	Japan
	Report

Bangkok, Thailand

Event: 1978 Asian Games
Pool match

13 December 1978

Pakistan	9 - 0	Thailand
	Report

\Bangkok, Thailand

Event: 1978 Asian Games
Pool match

15 December 1978

Bangladesh	0 - 17	Pakistan
	Report

Bangkok, Thailand

Event: 1978 Asian Games
Pool match

17 December 1978

Pakistan	5 - 2	Malaysia
	Report

Bangkok, Thailand

Event: 1978 Asian Games
Semifinal

19 December 1978

Pakistan	1 - 0	India
	Report

Bangkok, Thailand

Event: 1978 Asian Games
Final

=== 1979 ===
21 April 1979

Pakistan	9 - 0	Malaysia
	Report

Perth, Australia

Event: Esanda International Hockey Perth 1979
Pool match

22 April 1979

Pakistan	5 - 3	Great Britain
Kaleemullah 12', 28'; Sardar 31'; Hanif 66'	Report	Cattrall 26', 40', 51'

Perth, Australia

Event: Esanda International Hockey Perth 1979
Pool match

24 April 1979

Kenya	0 - 5	Pakistan
	Report

Perth, Australia

Event: Esanda International Hockey Perth 1979
Pool match

26 April 1979

New Zealand	1 - 5	Pakistan
	Report

Perth, Australia

Event: Esanda International Hockey Perth 1979
Pool match

28 April 1979

Pakistan	5 - 2	Netherlands
Kaleemullah 33', 55', 58', 65'; Samiullah 68'	Report	Kruize 14'; Bouwman 24'

Perth, Australia

Event: Esanda International Hockey Perth 1979
Semifinal

29 April 1979

Australia	2 - 4	Pakistan
Cooke 19'; Browning 37'	Report	Kaleemullah 26'; Hanif 30', 51'; Abbas 41'

Perth, Australia

Event: Esanda International Hockey Perth 1979
Final

TBD

Egypt	-/-	Pakistan
	[Record absent]

TBD, Egypt

Event: Test series
First Test match

TBD

Egypt	-/-	Pakistan
	[Record absent]

TBD, Egypt

Event: Test series
Second Test match

11 August 1979

Netherlands	2 - 5	Pakistan
Litjens 43', 56'	Report	Samiullah 1', 62'; Abbas 53'; Munawwar 64'; Hanif 67'

Groningen, Netherlands

Event: Test series
First Test match

12 August 1979

Netherlands	3 - 2	Pakistan
van 't Hek 23'; Litjens 43', 67'	Report	Manzoor Sr. 16'; Hanif 38'

Amstelveen, Netherlands

Event: Test series
Second Test match

15 August 1979

Netherlands	2 - 3	Pakistan
van 't Hek 9'; Litjens 68'	Report	Abbas 36'; Sardar 44'; Manzoor Sr. 60'

Utrecht, Netherlands

Event: Test series
Third Test match

16 August 1979

Netherlands	7 - 4	Pakistan
Litjens 13', 24', 26', 45'; Kruize 20' van 't Hek 37'; Steens 60'	Report	Sardar 15'; Samiullah 35'; Manzoor Sr. 51'; Mirza 62'

Rotterdam, Netherlands

Event: Test series
Fourth Test match

18 August 1979

Netherlands	2 - 1	Pakistan
van 't Hek 3' van Asbeck 12'	Report	Saeed 43'

Eindhoven, Netherlands

Event: Test series
Fifth Test match

19 August 1979

Netherlands	4 - 4	Pakistan
Steens 37'; Litjens 50', 69'; Kruize 57'	Report	Samiullah 20'; Manzoor Sr. 22'; Saeed 66', 68'

Amstelveen, Netherlands

Event: Test series
Sixth Test match

== Head-to-head record ==
Won more matches than lost
Won equal matches to lost
Lost more matches than won

Opponent	GP	W	D	L	GF	GA	First meeting	Last meeting
Netherlands	20	12	4	4	58	45	1971	1979
Australia	14	8	4	2	32	21	1971	1979
India	13	9	1	3	27	10	1970	1978
West Germany	12	7	0	5	30	21	1972	1978
Malaysia	10	10	0	0	40	6	1970	1979
Spain	9	5	3	1	22	11	1971	1978
New Zealand	5	5	0	0	20	5	1974	1979
Japan	5	5	0	0	13	0	1970	1978
Belgium	5	5	0	0	17	3	1972	1976
Egypt	4	4	0	0	27	0	1975	1979
Kenya	4	3	0	1	11	1	1970	1979
Poland	4	3	1	0	12	4	1972	1976
Argentina	3	3	0	0	16	1	1972	1978
Great Britain	2	2	0	0	9	3	1978	1979
Thailand	2	1	1	0	9	0	1970	1978
Canada	2	2	0	0	17	2	1974	1975
Bangladesh	1	1	0	0	17	0	1978	-
Italy	1	1	0	0	7	0	1978	-
Ireland	1	1	0	0	9	0	1978	-
Uganda	1	1	0	0	3	1	1972	-
France	1	1	0	0	3	0	1972	-
Hong Kong	1	1	0	0	10	0	1970	-
England	1	0	1	0	2	2	1973	-
Iran	1	1	0	0	13	0	1974	-
Sri Lanka	1	1	0	0	14	0	1974	-
