= Field hockey at the 1972 Summer Olympics =

Field hockey at the Games of the XX Olympiad
- Venue: Hockeyanlage
- Dates: 27 August – 10 September 1972
- Teams: 16

Medalists
1st place, gold medalist(s)		West Germany
2nd place, silver medalist(s)		Pakistan
3rd place, bronze medalist(s)		India

The field hockey tournament at the 1972 Summer Olympics was the 12th edition of the field hockey event at the Summer Olympics.

The West German victory was the first title by a European nation since 1920, but this was marred by the behavior of Pakistani players, fans, and officials: during the last ten minutes of the gold-medal match, the umpires had to stop play twice so that Pakistani fans who had invaded the pitch could be removed, while Pakistani players and officials repeatedly remonstrated with the umpires throughout that time.

At the final whistle, Pakistani fans and officials invaded the pitch and assaulted West German police and stadium security before storming the tournament officials' table and pouring a bucket of water over International Hockey Federation president Rene Frank, while the players stormed their locker room before proceeding to destroy it.

At the medal ceremony, the Pakistani players refused to wear their silver medals or face the West German flag as it was raised, and turned their backs as the West German national anthem was played.

The eleven Pakistani players were banned for life from their national team, but after a high-level apology, the ban was reduced to two years, and eight of them played at the 1976 Olympics.

== Medalists ==
Gold	Silver	Bronze
West Germany; Wolfgang Baumgart; Horst Drose; Dieter Freise; Werner Kaessmann; Carsten Keller; Detlev Kittstein; Ulrich Klaes; Peter Kraus; Michael Krause; Michael Peter; Wolfgang Rott; Fritz Schmidt; Rainer Seifert; Wolfgang Strodter; Eckart Suhl; Eduard Thelen; Peter Trump; Ulrich Vos	Pakistan; Rashid Abdul; Akhtar Rasool; Akhtar-ul-Islam; Jahangir Butt; Fazalur Rehman; Islahuddin Siddiquee; Muhammad Asad Malik; Shahnaz Sheikh; Munawwaruz Zaman; Ahmad Riaz; Saeed Anwar; Saleem Sherwani; Iftikar Syed; Mudassar Syed; Zahid Sheikh	India; B. P. Govinda; Charles Cornelius; Manuel Frederick; Michael Kindo; V.J. Philips; Ashok Kumar; M. P. Ganesh; Krishnamurty Perumal; Ajitpal Singh; Harbinder Singh; Harcharan Singh; Harmik Singh; Kulwant Singh; Mukhbain Singh; Virinder Singh; Vece Paes

== Umpires ==
On 25 October 1971, 13 umpires were appointed by the FIH. It was reported that 12 more umpires would be selected in February 1972.

- Charan Singh (KEN)
- Peter Lake (GBR)
- A. F. Lathouwers (NED)
- Sarosh Nagarwala (IND)
- Naqi (PAK)
- Andre Schittecalte (BEL)
- Fritz Seegers (FRG)
- Horacio Servetto (ARG)
- Vijayanathan (MAS)
- J. Richard Jewell (AUT)
- Luigi Tinti (ITA)
- Aziz Iskanbar (EGY)
- John Martens (SIN)

== Results ==
=== Preliminary round ===
==== Pool A ====
Pos	Team	Pld	W	D	L	GF	GA	GD	Pts	Qualification
1	West Germany (H)	7	6	1	0	17	5	+12	13	Advanced to Semi-finals
2	Pakistan	7	5	1	1	17	6	+11	11	Advanced to Semi-finals
3	Malaysia	7	4	1	2	9	7	+2	9	
4	Spain	7	2	4	1	9	8	+1	8	
5	Belgium	7	2	1	4	8	14	−6	5	
6	France	7	2	0	5	6	13	−7	4	
7	Argentina	7	0	3	4	4	9	−5	3	
8	Uganda	7	0	3	4	6	14	−8	3	

Source: FIH
Rules for classification: 1) points; 2) games won; 3) head-to-head result; 4) goal difference.
(H) Hosts

27 August 1972
10:30

West Germany	5–1	Belgium
Krause 13', 29', 59'; Klaes 32'; Droese 63'	Report	Miserque 33'

Umpires:
Luigi Tinti (ITA)
Osvaldo Pensosi (ITA)

27 August 1972
10:30

Pakistan	3–0	France
Anwar 29', 61'; Rashid 51'	Report

Umpires:
Leonard Elsgeshuysen (NED)
A.W. Petrus Roef (NED)

27 August 1972
13:30

Uganda	1–3	Malaysia
Adiga 60'	Report	Harnahal 10'; Ramalingam 47'; Murugesan 57'

Umpires:
Peter Lake (GBR)
Randolph Hillary Selman (GBR)

27 August 1972
13:30

Argentina	1–1	Spain
Quaquarini 28'	Report	Ju. Amat 40'

Umpires:
Sarosh Nagarwala (IND)
Sundaram Mudaliar (IND)

28 August 1972
15:00

Malaysia	0–1	West Germany
	Report	Kittstein 29'

Umpires:
J. Richard Jewell (AUS)
Sheik Dawood (KEN)

28 August 1972
15:00

Belgium	1–1	Argentina
Vanderborght 20'	Report	Quaquarini 19'

Umpires:
Nemi Chand Agarwal (IND)
Charan Singh (KEN)

28 August 1972
16:30

Spain	1–1	Pakistan
J. Fábregas 41'	Report	Zaman 5'

Umpires:
Osvaldo Pensosi (ITA)
Luigi Tinti (ITA)

28 August 1972
16:30

France	3–1	Uganda
Burtschell 21'; Coutou 40'; Pous 44'	Report	Kuldip 68'

Umpires:
Cho Myong-Yul (KOR)
Kasuo Oki (JPN)

29 August 1972
13:30

Uganda	1–3	Pakistan
Amarjit 38'	Report	Akhtarul 14'; Mudassar 23'; Shahnaz 38'

Umpires:
Kasuo Oki (JPN)
Cho Myong-Yul (KOR)

29 August 1972
15:00

Spain	0–0	Malaysia
	Report

Umpires:
Aziz Iskandar (EGY)
A.W. Petrus Roef (NED)

29 August 1972
15:00

France	0–1	Belgium
	Report	Gilles 33'

Umpires:
Sarosh Nagarwala (IND)
J. Richard Jewell (AUS)

29 August 1972
16:30

West Germany	2–1	Argentina
Seifert 12', 18'	Report	Quaquarini 61'

Umpires:
Sheik Dawood (KEN)
Randolph Hillary Selman (GBR)

31 August 1972
14:00

Pakistan	1–2	West Germany
Zaman 58'	Report	Baumgart 38'; Krause 57'

Umpires:
Horacio Servetto (ARG)
J. Richard Jewell (AUS)

31 August 1972
14:00

Argentina	0–0	Uganda
	Report

Umpires:
A.W. Petrus Roef (NED)
Kasuo Oki (JPN)

31 August 1972
15:30

Belgium	0–1	Spain
	Report	Ju. Amat 55'

Umpires:
Charan Singh (KEN)
Sundaram Mudaliar (IND)

31 August 1972
15:30

Malaysia	1–0	France
Murugesan 18'	Report

Umpires:
Leonard Elsgeshuysen (NED)
Peter Lake (GBR)

1 September 1972
10:00

Spain	3–2	France
J. Fábregas 11', 17'; Sallés 14'	Report	Pitau 32'; Pous 58'

Umpires:
Aziz Iskandar (EGY)
Charan Singh (KEN)

1 September 1972
10:00

Argentina	1–3	Pakistan
J. Sabbione 45'	Report	Rashid 17', 53'; Asad 48'

Umpires:
Leonard Elsgeshuysen (NED)
Marten John Rowsing (SGP)

1 September 1972
11:30

West Germany	1–1	Uganda
Krause 10'	Report	Kuldip 26'

Umpires:
Nemi Chand Agarwal (IND)
Peter Lake (GBR)

1 September 1972
11:30

Malaysia	4–2	Belgium
Ramalingam 6'; Sri 26'; De Cruz 30'; Murugesan 58'	Report	Miserque 12'; Vanderborght 52'

Umpires:
Sarosh Nagarwala (IND)
Sheik Dawood (KEN)

3 September 1972
10:30

Spain	1–2	West Germany
F. Amat 20'	Report	Krause 41'; Kaessmann 64'

Umpires:
Osvaldo Pensosi (ITA)
Luigi Tinti (ITA)

3 September 1972
10:30

Pakistan	3–0	Malaysia
Zaman 28'; Rashid 61'; Anwar 67'	Report

Umpires:
André Schittecatte (ITA)
J. Richard Jewell (AUS)

3 September 1972
14:30

France	1–0	Argentina
Darfeuille 26'	Report

Umpires:
Sarosh Nagarwala (IND)
Sheik Dawood (KEN)

3 September 1972
14:30

Belgium	2–0	Uganda
Gillard 61'; Gilles 67'	Report

Umpires:
A.W. Petrus Roef (NED)
Aziz Iskandar (EGY)

4 September 1972
10:00

Uganda	2–2	Spain
Kuldip 26'; Lobo 28'	Report	J. Fábregas 5'; Sallés 8'

Umpires:
Randolph Hillary Selman (GBR)
Sarosh Nagarwala (IND)

4 September 1972
10:00

Pakistan	3–1	Belgium
Zaman 20'; Rashid 44', 46'	Report	Gillard 16'

Umpires:
Bernard Valette (FRA)
J. Richard Jewell (AUS)

4 September 1972
11:30

West Germany	4–0	France
Krause 20', 33'; Keller 24'; Kaessmann 46'	Report

Umpires:
Osvaldo Pensosi (ITA)
Kasuo Oki (JPN)

4 September 1972
11:30

Malaysia	1–0	Argentina
Belavantheran 69'	Report

Umpires:
Luigi Tinti (ITA)
Aziz Iskandar (EGY)

==== Pool B ====
Pos	Team	Pld	W	D	L	GF	GA	GD	Pts	Qualification
1	India	7	5	2	0	25	8	+17	12	Advanced to Semi-finals
2	Netherlands	7	5	1	1	20	9	+11	11	Advanced to Semi-finals
3	Great Britain	7	4	1	2	15	10	+5	9	
4	Australia	7	3	2	2	18	8	+10	8	
5	New Zealand	7	2	3	2	16	11	+5	7	
6	Poland	7	2	2	3	12	12	0	6	
7	Kenya	7	1	1	5	8	17	−9	3	
8	Mexico	7	0	0	7	1	40	−39	0	

Source: FIH
Rules for classification: 1) points; 2) games won; 3) head-to-head result; 4) goal difference.

27 August 1972
15:00

India	1–1	Netherlands
Kumar 29'	Report	Zweerts 1'

Umpires:
Horacio Servetto (ARG)
Aziz Iskandar (EGY)

27 August 1972
15:00

Poland	1–0	Kenya
Matuszyński 11'	Report

Umpires:
Fritz Seegers (GER)
Fritz Möhr (GER)

27 August 1972
16:30

Australia	0–0	New Zealand
	Report

Umpires:
Ahmed Abrar (PAK)
Khurshid Ahmad Sheik (PAK)

27 August 1972
16:30

Great Britain	6–0	Mexico
Svehlik 16'; Marsh 45', 48'; Corby 53'; Saldanha 64', 67'	Report

Umpires:
G. Vijayanathan (MAS)
Martens John Rowsing (SGP)

28 August 1972
10:00

Australia	3–1	Kenya
Nilan 30', 60'; Riley 56'	Report	Surjit 40'

Umpires:
André Schittecatte (BEL)
Francis Steurs (BEL)

28 August 1972
10:00

New Zealand	7–0	Mexico
Maister 14', 18', 19'; Borren 52', 57', 58'; Archibald 68'	Report

Umpires:
Saifi (PAK)
Ahmed Abrar (PAK)

28 August 1972
11:30

Great Britain	0–5	India
	Report	Mukhbain 15', 30', 32'; Kindo 19'; Harmik 67'

Umpires:
Jacky Manneback (BEL)
Hans Joachim Dröz (GER)

28 August 1972
11:30

Netherlands	4–2	Poland
Kruize 5', 12', 26', 64'	Report	Kaźmierczak 39'; Grotowski 60'

Umpires:
Jaime Salvatella (ESP)
Bernard Valette (FRA)

30 August 1972
13:30

Mexico	0–3	Poland
	Report	Ziaja 21'; Grotowski 38'; Otulakowski 41'

Umpires:
G. Vijayanathan (MAS)
Jacky Manneback (BEL)

30 August 1972
15:00

Kenya	1–5	Netherlands
Surjit 70'	Report	Kruize 2', 11', 49', 51'; F. Spits 56'

Umpires:
Horacio Servetto (ARG)
Bernard Valette (FRA)

30 August 1972
15:00

New Zealand	2–1	Great Britain
Dayman 24'; Maister 26'	Report	French 40'

Umpires:
Jaime Salvatella (ESP)
André Schittecatte (BEL)

30 August 1972
16:30

India	3–1	Australia
Mukhbain 7', 16', 61'	Report	Mason 26'

Umpires:
Francis Steurs (FRA)
Fritz Seegers (GER)

31 August 1972
10:00

Kenya	0–2	Great Britain
	Report	Corby 29'; Crowe 65'

Umpires:
Hans Joachim Dröz (GER)
Fritz Möhr (GER)

31 August 1972
10:00

Poland	2–2	India
Ziaja 36', 40'	Report	Harmik 7'; Billimoga 50'

Umpires:
Osvaldo Pensosi (ITA)
G. Vijayanathan (MAS)

31 August 1972
11:30

Netherlands	2–0	New Zealand
Kruize 9', 67'	Report

Umpires:
Saifi (PAK)
Luigi Tinti (ITA)

31 August 1972
11:30

Australia	10–0	Mexico
Riley 16', 22', 31', 47', 63'; Mason 24', 30'; Charlesworth 35'; Browning 51'; Smart 55'	Report

Umpires:
Willy Arber (SUI)
Khurshid Ahmad Sheik (PAK)

2 September 1972
10:00

India	3–2	Kenya
Mukhbain 36', 57'; Harmik 48'	Report	Davinder 25', 45'

Umpires:
Jacky Manneback (BEL)
André Schittecatte (BEL)

2 September 1972
10:00

Poland	3–3	New Zealand
Otulakowski 17'; Matuszyński 26'; Grotowski 36'	Report	Dayman 11', 48', 53'

Umpires:
Bernard Valette (FRA)
Fritz Seegers (GER)

2 September 1972
11:30

Great Britain	1–1	Australia
Svehlik 22'	Report	Riley 21'

Umpires:
Jaime Salvatella (ESP)
Saifi (PAK)

2 September 1972
11:30

Mexico	0–4	Netherlands
	Report	Kruize 8', 22'; F. Spits 34'; N. Spits 44'

Umpires:
Khurshid Ahmad Sheik (PAK)
Ahmed Abrar (PAK)

3 September 1972
14:30

Netherlands	1–3	Great Britain
Kruize 34'	Report	Mamood 1'; Corby 43'; Svehlik 47'

Umpires:
G. Vijayanathan (MAS)
Jaime Salvatella (ESP)

3 September 1972
14:30

Australia	1–0	Poland
Glencross 16'	Report

Umpires:
Horacio Servetto (ARG)
Fritz Seegers (GER)

3 September 1972
16:00

Mexico	0–8	India
	Report	Harmik 6'; Kumar 9', 61'; Kulwant 22', 50', 56'; Kindo 35'; Billimoga 63'

Umpires:
Fritz Möhr (GER)
Hans Joachim Dröz (GER)

3 September 1972
16:00

New Zealand	2–2	Kenya
Dayman 2', 11'	Report	Panesar 21', 24'

Umpires:
Bernard Valette (FRA)
Francis Steurs (BEL)

4 September 1972
14:00

Netherlands	3–2	Australia
Kruize 9', 15', 34'	Report	Glencross 32'; Mason 39'

Umpires:
André Schittecatte (BEL)
G. Vijayanathan (MAS)

4 September 1972
14:00

Kenya	2–1	Mexico
Tarlochan 16'; Brajinder 39'	Report	Mascaro 59'

Umpires:
Fritz Möhr (GER)
Khurshid Ahmad Sheik (PAK)

4 September 1972
15:30

India	3–2	New Zealand
Kulwant 28'; Mullera 51'; Kindo 61'	Report	Maister 6'; Dayman 58'

Umpires:
Jaime Salvatella (ESP)
Horacio Servetto (ARG)

4 September 1972
15:30

Great Britain	2–1	Poland
Langhorne 17'; Gregg 51'	Report	Grotowski 33'

Umpires:
Fritz Seegers (GER)
Francis Steurs (BEL)

=== Classification round ===
==== Ninth to sixteenth place classification ====
===== Fifteenth and sixteenth place =====
7 September 1972
10:00

Uganda	4–1	Mexico
Rajinder 30'; Jagdish 52'; Ajit 53'; Kuldip 55'	Report	Huacuja 11'

Umpires:
Ahmed Abrar (PAK)
Willy Arber (SUI)

===== Thirteenth and fourteenth place =====
7 September 1972
11:30

Argentina	0–1 (a.e.t.)	Kenya
	Report	Avtar 72'

Umpires:
A.W. Petrus Roef (NED)
Leonard Elsgeshuysen (NED)

===== Eleventh and twelfth place =====
8 September 1972
10:00

France	4–4 (a.e.t.)	Poland
Burtschell 29'; Coutou 31'; Pous 41'; Grain 46'	Report	Wybieralski 18'; Wrona 45'; Grotowski 48'; Otulakowski 67'
Penalties
Penalty shoot-out missed	0–3	(penalty shoot-out scored) Otulakowski; (penalty shoot-out scored) Grotowski; (penalty shoot-out scored) Kasprzyk

Umpires:
Saifi (PAK)
Luigi Tinti (ITA)

===== Ninth and tenth place =====
8 September 1972
11:30

Belgium	1–2	New Zealand
Collin 39'	Report	Borren 47'; Maister 49'

Umpires:
Sarosh Narerwala (IND)
Jaime Salvatella (ESP)

==== Fifth to eighth place classification ====
Crossover
7 September 1972
Malaysia	1
Australia (a.e.t)	2
7 September 1972
Great Britain	2
Spain	0

Fifth Place
9 September 1972
Australia (a.e.t)	2
Great Britain	1
Seventh Place
9 September 1972
Malaysia	1
Spain	2

===== Crossover =====
7 September 1972
14:00

Malaysia	1–2 (a.e.t.)	Australia
Murugesan 6'	Report	Charlesworth 58', 87'

Umpires:
Francis Steurs (BEL)
Jacky Manneback (BEL)

7 September 1972
16:00

Great Britain	2–0	Spain
Svehlik 14', 59'	Report

Umpires:
Fritz Seegers (GER)
Fritz Möhr (GER)

===== Seventh and eighth place =====
9 September 1972
10:00

Malaysia	1–2	Spain
Sri 54'	Report	Alustiza 29'; F. Amat 31'

Umpires:
A.W. Petrus Roef (NED)
Fritz Seegers (GER)

===== Fifth and sixth place =====
9 September 1972
11:30

Australia	2–1 (a.e.t.)	Great Britain
Glencross 43'; Riley 82'	Report	Gregg 44'

Umpires:
Jaime Salvatella (ESP)
G. Vijayanathan (MAS)

=== Medal round ===
Semi-finals
8 September 1972
West Germany	3
Netherlands	0
8 September 1972
India	0
Pakistan	2

Gold-medal match
10 September 1972
West Germany	1
Pakistan	0
Bronze-medal match
10 September 1972
Netherlands	1
India	2

==== Semi-finals ====
8 September 1972
14:00

West Germany	3–0	Netherlands
Vos 20'; Krause 53'; Droese 69'	Report

Umpires:
G. Vijayanathan (MAS)
Osvaldo Pensosi (ITA)

8 September 1972
16:00

India	0–2	Pakistan
	Report	Rehman 11'; Shahnaz 34'

Umpires:
Horacio Servetto (ARG)
J. Richard Jewell (AUS)

==== Bronze-medal match ====
10 September 1972
10:00

Netherlands	1–2	India (bronze)
Kruize 6'	Report	Billimoga 15'; Mukhbain 70'

Umpires:
Osvaldo Pensosi (ITA)
Bernard Valette (FRA)

==== Gold-medal match ====
10 September 1972
12:00

(gold) West Germany	1–0	Pakistan (silver)
Krause 60'	Report

Umpires:
J. Richard Jewell (AUS)
Horacio Servetto (ARG)

== Final rankings ==
As per statistical convention in field hockey, matches decided in regular time are counted as wins and losses, while matches decided by penalty shoot-outs are counted as draws.

Pos	Team	Pld	W	D	L	GF	GA	GD	Pts	Final result
1st place, gold medalist(s)	West Germany (H)	9	8	1	0	21	5	+16	17	Gold Medal
2nd place, silver medalist(s)	Pakistan	9	6	1	2	19	7	+12	13	Silver Medal
3rd place, bronze medalist(s)	India	9	6	2	1	27	11	+16	14	Bronze Medal
4	Netherlands	9	5	1	3	21	14	+7	11	Fourth place
5	Australia	9	5	2	2	22	10	+12	12	Eliminated in group stage
6	Great Britain	9	5	1	3	18	12	+6	11	Eliminated in group stage
7	Spain	9	3	4	2	11	11	0	10	Eliminated in group stage
8	Malaysia	9	4	1	4	11	11	0	9	Eliminated in group stage
9	New Zealand	8	3	3	2	18	12	+6	9	Eliminated in group stage
10	Belgium	8	2	1	5	9	16	−7	5	Eliminated in group stage
11	Poland	8	2	3	3	16	16	0	7	Eliminated in group stage
12	France	8	2	1	5	10	17	−7	5	Eliminated in group stage
13	Kenya	8	2	1	5	9	17	−8	5	Eliminated in group stage
14	Argentina	8	0	3	5	4	10	−6	3	Eliminated in group stage
15	Uganda	8	1	3	4	10	15	−5	5	Eliminated in group stage
16	Mexico	8	0	0	8	2	44	−42	0	Eliminated in group stage

Source: FIH
(H) Hosts

== Goalscorers ==
17 goals

- (Netherlands) Ties Kruize

10 goals

- (West Germany) Michael Krause

9 goals

- (India) Mukhbain Singh

8 goals

- (Australia) Ronald Riley

7 goals

- (New Zealand) Greg Dayman

6 goals

- (New Zealand) Barry Maister
- (Pakistan) Abdul Rashid

5 goals

- (United Kingdom) Paul Svehlik
- (Poland) Henryk Grotowski

4 goals

- (Australia) James Mason
- (India) Harmik Singh
- (India) Kulwant Singh
- (Malaysia) Murugesan Mahendran
- (New Zealand) Jan Borren
- (Pakistan) Munawwaruz Zaman
- (Spain) Jorge Fábregas
- (Uganda) Kuldip Singh Bhogal

3 goals

- (Argentina) Alfredo Quaquarini
- (Australia) Ric Charlesworth
- (Australia) Brian Glencross
- (France) Charles Pous
- (United Kingdom) Michael Corby
- (India) B. P. Govinda
- (India) Michael Kindo
- (India) Ashok Kumar
- (Poland) Stefan Otulakowski
- (Poland) Witold Ziaja
- (Pakistan) Saeed Anwar

2 goals

- (Australia) Patrick Nilan
- (Belgium) Patrick Gillard
- (Belgium) Jean-François Gilles
- (Belgium) Guy Miserque
- (Belgium) Carl-Eric Vanderborght
- (France) Patrick Burtschell
- (France) Francis Coutou
- (United Kingdom) Terry Gregg
- (United Kingdom) Peter Marsh
- (United Kingdom) Rui Saldanha
- (Kenya) Davinder Singh Deegan
- (Kenya) Surjeet Singh Panesar
- (Kenya) Surjit Singh Rihal
- (Malaysia) Ramalingam Pathmarajah
- (Malaysia) Sri Shanmuganathan
- (Netherlands) Frans Spits
- (Pakistan) Shahnaz Sheikh
- (Poland) Włodzimierz Matuszyński
- (Spain) Francisco Amat
- (Spain) José Sallés
- (West Germany) Horst Dröse
- (West Germany) Werner Kaessmann
- (West Germany) Rainer Seifert

1 goal

- (Argentina) Jorge Sabbione
- (Australia) Greg Browning
- (Australia) Donald Smart
- (Belgium) Philippe Collin
- (France) Jean-Luc Darfeuille
- (France) Georges Grain
- (France) Eric Pitau
- (United Kingdom) Joe Ahmad
- (United Kingdom) Michael Crowe
- (United Kingdom) John French
- (United Kingdom) Christopher Langhorne
- (India) M. P. Ganesh
- (Kenya) Tarlochan Singh Chana
- (Kenya) Brajinder Singh Daved
- (Kenya) Avtar Singh Sohal
- (Malaysia) Francis Belavantheran
- (Malaysia) Franco De Cruz
- (Malaysia) Harnahal Singh Sewa
- (Mexico) José Miguel Huacuja
- (Mexico) José María Mascaro
- (Netherlands) Nico Spits
- (Netherlands) Jeroen Zweerts
- (New Zealand) Jeff Archibald
- (Pakistan) Mudassar Asghar
- (Pakistan) Akhtarul Islam
- (Pakistan) Muhammad Asad Malik
- (Pakistan) Fazalur Rehman
- (Poland) Stanisław Kaźmierczak
- (Poland) Aleksander Wrona
- (Poland) Józef Wybieralski
- (Spain) José Alustiza
- (Spain) Jaime Amat
- (Spain) Juan Amat
- (Uganda) Paul Adiga
- (Uganda) Willie Lobo
- (Uganda) Ajit Singh Bhogal
- (Uganda) Jagdish Singh Kapoor
- (Uganda) Amarjit Singh Sandhu
- (Uganda) Rajinder Singh Sandhu
- (West Germany) Wolfgang Baumgart
- (West Germany) Carsten Keller
- (West Germany) Detlev Kittstein
- (West Germany) Ulrich Klaes
- (West Germany) Uli Vos

Source: Olympedia
