= Pakistan at the 1972 Summer Olympics =

- IOC code: PAK
- NOC: National Olympic Committee of Pakistan
- Website: www.nocpakistan.org

in Munich
- Competitors: 28 in 5 sports
- Flag bearer: Muhammad Arshad Malik
- Medals Ranked 33rd: Gold 0 Silver 1 Bronze 0 Total 1

Summer Olympics appearances (overview)
- 1948; 1952; 1956; 1960; 1964; 1968; 1972; 1976; 1980; 1984; 1988; 1992; 1996; 2000; 2004; 2008; 2012; 2016; 2020; 2024

Pakistan competed at the 1972 Summer Olympics in Munich, West Germany. The men's hockey team won a silver medal.

== Medalists ==
Silver medal in men's field hockey team competition.

Medals by sport
Sport	Gold	Silver	Bronze	Total
Field Hockey	0	1	0	1
Total	0	1	0	1

== Results by event ==
=== Athletics ===
Men's 200 metres

- Nusrat Iqbal Sahi

- Heat 6 1st round; 22.07 (→ did not advance)

Men's 400 metres

- Nusrat Iqbal Sahi

- Heat 1 1st round; 49.47 (→ did not advance)

Men's 800 metres

- Muhammad Siddique

- Heat 6 1st round; 1:52.6 (→ did not advance)

Men's 1500 metres

- Mohammad Younus

- Heat 2 1st round; 3:44.1 (→ did not advance)

Men's 110 metres hurdles

- Bashir Ahmed

- Heat 1 1st round; 15.38 (→ did not advance)

Men's 400 metres hurdles

- Norman Brinkworth

- Heat 3 1st round; 54.67 (→ did not advance)

Men's 4 × 100 m relay

- Mohammad Younus, Norman Brinkworth, Muhammad Siddique and Nusrat Iqbal Sahi

- Heat 1 1st round; DNP (→ did not participate)

=== Boxing ===
Men's Flyweight (– 51 kg)

- Jan Baloch

- First round — Lost to Georgi Kostadinov (BUL), TKO-2

Men's Light Welterweight (– 63.5 kg)

- Malang Baloch

- First round — Lost to Graham Moughton (GBR), 0:5

=== Hockey ===
==== Men's team competition ====
- Preliminary round Group A

- Defeated France (3-0)
- Drew with Spain (1-1)
- Defeated Uganda (3-1)
- Lost to West Germany (1-2)
- Defeated Argentina (3-1)
- Defeated Malaysia (3-0)
- Defeated Belgium (3-1)

- Semifinals

- Defeated India (2-0)

- Final

- Lost to West Germany (0-1) → Silver Medal

- Team Roster
- Mohammad Asad Malik (captain)
- Saeed Anwar (vice-captain)
- Saleem Sherwani (gk)
- Mohammad Aslam (gk)
- Munawwaruz Zaman
- Zahid Sheikh
- Fazalur Rehman
- Shahnaz Sheikh
- Abdul Rasheed Jr
- Akhtarul Islam
- Islahuddin
- Mudassar Asghar
- Jahangir Butt
- Iftikhar Syed
- Riaz Ahmed
- Akhtar Rasool
- Tanvir Dar
- Umar Farooq

=== Weightlifting ===
Men's Middleweight (-75 kg)

- Mohammad Arshad Malik

- Press 117.5kg
- Snatch 107.5kg
- Jerk 147.5kg
- Total 372.5kg (finished 19th out of 19)

=== Wrestling ===
Men's Freestyle Bantamweight (– 67 kg)

- Allah Ditta

- 1st round — Lost to Jorge Ramos (CUB)
- 2nd round — Lost to Risto Darlev (YUG)

Men's Freestyle Welterweight (– 74 kg)

- Muhammad Yaghoub

- 1st round — Lost to Mildos Urbanovics (HUN)
- 2nd round — Drew with Shakar Khan Shakar (AFG)
- 3rd round — Lost to Jan Karlsson (SWE)
