= India at the 1972 Summer Olympics =

- IOC code: IND
- NOC: Indian Olympic Association

in Munich
- Competitors: 41 (40 men, 1 woman) in 7 sports
- Flag bearer: D.N. Devine Jones
- Medals Ranked 43rd: Gold 0 Silver 0 Bronze 1 Total 1

Summer Olympics appearances (overview)
- 1900; 1904–1912; 1920; 1924; 1928; 1932; 1936; 1948; 1952; 1956; 1960; 1964; 1968; 1972; 1976; 1980; 1984; 1988; 1992; 1996; 2000; 2004; 2008; 2012; 2016; 2020; 2024

Other related appearances
- Pakistan (1948–pres.); Bangladesh (1984–pres.)

India competed at the 1972 Summer Olympics in Munich, West Germany. 41 competitors, 40 men and one woman, took part in 27 events in 7 sports.

== Competitors ==
Sports	Men	Women	Total	Events
Athletics	7	1	8	9
Boxing	3	0	3	3
Field hockey	14	0	14	1
Shooting	4	0	4	3
Sailing	3	0	3	2
Weightlifting	1	0	1	1
Wrestling	8	0	8	8
Total	40	1	41	27

== Medalists ==
=== Bronze ===
- Charles Cornelius, Manuel Frederick, Ashok Kumar, Michael Kindo, Ganesh Mullera Poovayya, Krishnamurty Perumal, Victor Philips, Harcharan singh, B. P. Govinda, Vece Paes, Ajitpal Singh, Harbinder Singh, Harmik Singh, Kulwant Singh, Mukhbain Singh, and Virinder Singh — Field hockey, Men's Team Competition.

== Athletics ==
Men's 800 metres

- Sriram Singh

- Heat — 1:47.7 (→ did not advance)

- Rajinder Kohli

- Heat —1:48.1 (→did not advance)

Men's 5000 metres

- Edward Sequeira

- Heat — 14:01.4 (→ did not advance)

Men's Long jump

- Mohinder Gill Singh

- Qualification Round — 7.30(→ 30th place)

Men's High Jump

- Suresh Babu

- Qualification Round — 1.90m (→ did not advance)

Men's Shot put

- Jugraj Singh

- Qualification Round — 17.15(→ 26th place)

Men's Discus throw

- Praveen Kumar Sobti

- Qualification Round — 53.12(→ 26th place)

== Boxing ==
Men's Flyweight (– 51 kg)

- Chander Narayanan

- First Round — Bye
- Second Round — Lost to Leszek Błażyński (POL), 2:3

== Field hockey ==
Team Roaster

- Manuel Frederick
- Mukhbain Singh
- Michael Kindo
- Varinder Singh
- Ajitpal Singh
- Harmik Singh
- Ganesh Mollerapoovayya
- Harbinder Singh
- Kulwant Singh
- Ashok Kumar
- Harcharan Singh
- Charles Cornelius
- Krishnamurty Perumal
- Govinda Billimogaputtaswamy
- Victor Philips
- Vece Paes

=== Preliminary round ===
==== Pool B ====
Pos	Team	Pld	W	D	L	GF	GA	GD	Pts	Qualification
1	India	7	5	2	0	25	8	+17	12	Advanced to Semi-finals
2	Netherlands	7	5	1	1	20	9	+11	11	Advanced to Semi-finals
3	Great Britain	7	4	1	2	15	10	+5	9	
4	Australia	7	3	2	2	18	8	+10	8	
5	New Zealand	7	2	3	2	16	11	+5	7	
6	Poland	7	2	2	3	12	12	0	6	
7	Kenya	7	1	1	5	8	17	−9	3	
8	Mexico	7	0	0	7	1	40	−39	0	

Source: FIH
Rules for classification: 1) points; 2) games won; 3) head-to-head result; 4) goal difference.

27 August 1972
15:00

India	1–1	Netherlands
Kumar 29'	Report	Zweerts 1'

Umpires:
Horacio Servetto (ARG)
Aziz Iskandar (EGY)

28 August 1972
11:30

Great Britain	0–5	India
	Report	Mukhbain 15', 30', 32'; Kindo 19'; Harmik 67'

Umpires:
Jacky Manneback (BEL)
Hans Joachim Dröz (GER)

30 August 1972
16:30

India	3–1	Australia
Mukhbain 7', 16', 61'	Report	Mason 26'

Umpires:
Francis Steurs (FRA)
Fritz Seegers (GER)

31 August 1972
10:00

Poland	2–2	India
Ziaja 36', 40'	Report	Harmik 7'; Billimoga 50'

Umpires:
Osvaldo Pensosi (ITA)
G. Vijayanathan (MAS)

2 September 1972
10:00

India	3–2	Kenya
Mukhbain 36', 57'; Harmik 48'	Report	Davinder 25', 45'

Umpires:
Jacky Manneback (BEL)
André Schittecatte (BEL)

3 September 1972
16:00

Mexico	0–8	India
	Report	Harmik 6'; Kumar 9', 61'; Kulwant 22', 50', 56'; Kindo 35'; Billimoga 63'

Umpires:
Fritz Möhr (GER)
Hans Joachim Dröz (GER)

4 September 1972
15:30

India	3–2	New Zealand
Kulwant 28'; Mullera 51'; Kindo 61'	Report	Maister 6'; Dayman 58'

Umpires:
Jaime Salvatella (ESP)
Horacio Servetto (ARG)

==== Semi-finals ====
8 September 1972
16:00

India	0–2	Pakistan
	Report	Rehman 11'; Shahnaz 34'

Umpires:
Horacio Servetto (ARG)
J. Richard Jewell (AUS)

==== Bronze-medal match ====
10 September 1972
10:00

Netherlands	1–2	India
Kruize 6'	Report	Billimoga 15'; Mukhbain 70'

Umpires:
Osvaldo Pensosi (ITA)
Bernard Valette (FRA)

== Shooting ==
Four male shooters represented India in 1972.

50 m rifle, prone

- Parimal Chatterjee

- Qualification Round — 572(→ 95th place)

- Roy Choudhury

- Qualification Round — 567(→ 99th place)

Trap

- Karni Singh

- Qualification Round — 180(→ 34th place)

Trap

- Randhir Singh

- Qualification Round — 173(→ 44th place)

Skeet

- Karni Singh

- Qualification Round — 186(→ 36th place)

== Weightlifting ==
Men

Athlete	Event	Military press			Snatch			Clean & Jerk			Total	Rank
Athlete	Event	1	2	3	1	2	3	1	2	3	Total	Rank
Anil Mondal	– 51.65 kg	85.0	90.0	95.0	80.0	85.0	~~90.0~~	107.5	112.5	117.5	297.5	11
