= Paul Adiga =

Ugandan field hockey player

Personal information
- Nationality: Ugandan
- Born: 21 March 1952 (age 74)
- Height: 1.76 m (5 ft 9 in)
- Weight: 74 kg (163 lb)

Sport
- Sport: Field hockey
- Club: Police

Paul Adiga (born 21 March 1952) is a Ugandan field hockey player. He represented Uganda in the 1972 Summer Olympics in Munich.

== Early life and background ==
Paul Adiga was born on 21 March 1952 in Uganda. He played for the Police club in uganda a team associated with the national police force.

== Field hockey career ==
As a field hockey player, Adiga was part of the Ugandan national team that competed in the 1972 Summer Olympics. Field hockey had been an established sport in East Africa, particularly in Uganda, Kenya and Tanzania during the 20th century and this was largely due to British colonial influence. Competing on the Olympic stage was a significant achievement for Ugandan athletes at that time given the limited resources and international exposure compared to teams from traditional hockey powerhouses.

At the 1972 Olympics, Uganda competed against established teams from Europe, Asia and the United States. Participation was a milestone representing Uganda in major global sporting event.

== Legacy and impact ==
Paul Adiga remains part of a generation of Ugandan athletes who reached international competition during a challenging era for African sports. His involvement in olympic reflects not ony his personal athletic achievements but also the boarder history of field hockey in Uganda an era when the sport enjoyed popularity before political changes in the 1970s and 1980s impacted sporting infrastructure and international competition.

== See also ==
- Joe Ahmad
- Riaz Ahmed
- José Alustiza
- Francisco Amat
- Jaime Amat
- Juan Amat
