= Netherlands–Pakistan field hockey record =

Netherlands–Pakistan hockey rivalry
- Netherlands Pakistan
- Sport: Field hockey
- Location: Netherlands (EHF); Pakistan (AHF)
- Teams: 2
- First meeting: 7 August 1948; 78 years ago; Pakistan 6–1 Netherlands
- Latest meeting: 12 December 2025; 10 months ago; Pakistan 3–7 Netherlands

Statistics
- Total meetings: 148
- Most wins: Pakistan (60); Netherlands (58)
- Most player appearances: Waseem Ahmed, Shahbaz Ahmed (42)
- Top scorer: Sohail Abbas (24)
- Largest victory: Netherlands 9–2 Pakistan (25 July 2006)

This article lists various team and individual Netherlands-Pakistan field hockey records between the national field hockey teams of both countries. Netherlands and Pakistan are one of the most successful teams in international field hockey, between the two teams is a record seven Hockey World Cup titles and five Olympic gold medals won. The sport enjoys popular sport in both the countries.

Both countries have regularly competed since their first meeting at the 1948 Olympics in London.

== History ==
The game was first introduced in Netherlands around the late 1800s and in 1892 the first game of field hockey was played in the country. The game gained quick popularity and soon Netherlands started to compete in international events including the Summer Olympics. The sport around the same time was brought by British servicemen in the subcontinent during the era of British India. The game also gained mass popularity there and after the independence of Pakistan from British rule in 1947 the sport was carried on by players who formerly played for the Indian team. The first international match between the two was played at the pool stage of the 1948 Olympics where Pakistan won with a margin of 6–1. Tanvir Dar of Pakistan scored four goals including the first goal of the match. The teams again met in the match for third place where it ended in a 1–1 draw so a replay was scheduled the next day, Netherlands won 4–1 to clinch bronze medal at the event. Two weeks later after the Olympics Pakistan traveled to Netherlands to play a friendly match at the Olympic Stadium in Amsterdam. The match ended in goalless draw, this was the first instance one team hosted the other in its country.

Throughout the next decade both teams met each other occasionally with the match at the 1952 Olympics being the most prominent, Netherlands won 1–0. In 1967 Netherlands toured Pakistan for the first time for a three match series along with side matches with district based club teams Pakistan won the series 2–0 The following year Pakistan recorded a 6–0 victory against Netherlands at the 1968 Olympics in Mexico their biggest win to this day. From the 1970s and onwards with the introduction of more international tournaments like the Hockey World Cup, Hockey Champions Trophy and increase of test series between the two the number of matches became frequent and a highlight of the sport. Pakistan and Netherlands have met in three World Cup finals in 1978, 1990 and 1994.

Pakistan remained the better win loss ratio for two decades from 1960 to 1980s and won more matches but in the 1990s that margin became less and Netherlands gained the dominance from the 2000s until now. During the 2006 Hockey Champions Trophy match in Terrassa, Spain Netherlands recorded a win by 9–2 against Pakistan the biggest win by margin between the two ever and at that time Pakistan's biggest defeat in history as well.

The hockey federations of both countries enjoy close ties. There are regular tours done by Pakistani hockey academies to Netherlands where they play practice matches. Netherlands' Hoofdklasse is considered as the world's best hockey league in the world with players form around the top hockey playing nations participating in it. Many Pakistani players have appeared in the league and some players like Sohail Abbas and Shahbaz Ahmed were the main crowd attraction during their playing time in the Netherlands. Dutch players also enjoy popular support in Pakistan with players like Floris Jan Bovelander and Paul Litjens being quite popular in Pakistan during international tournaments in the country.

== Statistics ==
=== Major Honors ===
- indicates that the team has more titles in that competition than its rival.

Tournament	Netherlands	Pakistan
Summer Olympics	3 (1996, 2000, 2024)	3 (1960, 1968, 1984)
World Cup	3 (1973, 1990, 1998)	4 (1971, 1978, 1982, 1994)
FIH Pro League	3 (2021–22, 2022–23, 2024–25)	–
Champions Trophy	8 (1981, 1982, 1996, 1998, 2000, 2002, 2003, 2006	3 (1978, 1980, 1994)
FIH Hockey World League	1 (2012–13)	–
Sultan Azlan Shah Cup	1 (2006)	3 (1999, 2000, 2003)

=== Head-to-head ===
Competition	Matches	Netherlands won	Draw	Pakistan won	Netherlands goals	Pakistan goals
Olympics	12	4	2	6	23	31
World Cup	12	4	2	6	27	26
FIH Pro League	2	2	0	0	12	5
Champions Trophy	36	21	6	9	106	59
Test matches	51	12	15	24	92	115
Other Tournaments	35	15	5	15	95	80
Total	148	58	30	60	355	316

=== Individual records ===
==== Top goalscorers ====
Name	Goals	Matches	Period
(Pakistan) Sohail Abbas	24	28	1998-2012
(Netherlands) Paul Litjens	23	26	1970-1982
(Netherlands) Floris Jan Bovelander	21	38	1985-1996
(Netherlands) Ties Kruize	19	40	1971-1986

==== Most appearances ====
Name	Matches	Goals	Period
(Pakistan) Waseem Ahmed	42	0	1996-2013
(Pakistan) Shahbaz Ahmed	42	5	1986-2002
(Netherlands) Ties Kruize	40	19	1971-1986
(Netherlands) Floris Jan Bovelander	38	21	1985-1996

==== Hat-tricks ====
No	Name	Goals	Result	Date	Competition
1.	(Pakistan) Ali Iqtidar Shah Dara	4 (8', 28', 47', 59')	6-1	7 August 1948	Olympics
2.	(Pakistan) Muhammad Asad Malik	3 (10', 15', 65')	2-3	26 October 1963	Test match
3.	(Pakistan) Tanvir Dar	3 (8',43',62')	3-3	17 October 1971	World Cup
4.	(Pakistan) Kaleemullah Khan	4 (33', 55', 58', 65')	5-2	28 April 1979	Esanda Cup
5.	(Netherlands) Paul Litjens	4 (13', 24', 26', 45')	7-4	16 August 1979	Test match
6.	(Netherlands) Tom Van't Hek	3 (11',34',56')	3-5	21 June 1981	Four Nations
7.	(Netherlands) Ties Kruize	5 (4', 14', 39', 56', 61')	7-2	13 June 1982	Champions Trophy
8.	(Netherlands) Roderik Bouwman	4 (10', 24', 39', 48')	6-3	16 December 1982	Esanda Cup
9.	(Netherlands) Floris Jan Bovelander	3 (13',27',49')	3-2	13 June 1989	Champions Trophy
10.	(Netherlands) Taco Van den Honert	5 (11', 46', 59', 64', 68')	6-2	11 July 1993	Champions Trophy
11.	(Netherlands) Floris Jan Bovelander (2)	4 (3',6',9',19')	6-2	30 June 1994	Seven Nations
12.	(Netherlands) Tuen de Nooijer	3 (22',30',52')	5-2	18 October 1997	Champions Trophy
13.	(Netherlands) Bram Lomans	3 (15',22',32')	4-2	15 August 1999	Four Nations
14.	(Pakistan) Rehan Butt	3 (40', 41', 66')	6-5	13 August 2005	Hamburg Masters
15.	(Netherlands) Ronald Brouwer	4 (30', 44', 65', 70')	9-2	25 July 2006	Champions Trophy
16.	(Pakistan) Sohail Abbas	3 (27',62',69')	6-4	26 August 2006	Hamburg Masters
17.	(Netherlands) Taeke Taekema	3 (15',38',61')	4-1	8 December 2007	Champions Trophy

== Historical matches ==
=== 1968 Olympics ===
Both teams met at the opening match of the 1968 Olympics in Mexico City Pakistan remained in complete dominance from the start after Tanvir Dar put Pakistan ahead from a short corner. Pakistan scored two more goals within two minutes of each goal, first Muhammad Asad Malik shot from a pass of a long corner in the thirteenth minute two minutes later Ashfaq Ahmed connected a cross from Khalid Mehmood on the right wing to make the score 3–0 at half-time. The game's picture remained the same in the second half with Pakistan completely dominating its opponent. Abdul Rashid Jr. scored to make it 4–0 in the fiftieth minute and later in the fifty eighth minute scored another. Tanvir Dar earned another short corner in the sixty third minute and converted yet again to make the score line 6–0 at the end of the play. This was the biggest win by margin between two at the time.

13 October 1968

Pakistan	6–0	Netherlands
Dar 6', 63'; Asad 13'; Ashfaq 15'; Rashid Jr. 50', 58'	Report

Municipal Stadium, Mexico City

1968 Summer Olympics
Pool match

=== 1971 World Cup ===
In the inaugural edition of the FIH Hockey World Cup in Barcelona, Spain Pakistan and Netherlands were the favorites. Pakistan had won its first game against Australia by 5-2 Netherlands had a goalless draw against hosts Spain in their opening pool match in this match Netherlands suffered injuries to some of its key players. Pakistan got the lead in the match three times through Tanvir Dar who scored all three goals from short corners but every time Netherlands managed to reply back within few minutes from conceding. First it was Nico Spits who equalized in the thirteenth minute making the score 1-1 then again Spits combined with a move from Ties Kruize leveled the score again in the forty eighth minute. Near the last minutes of the game Dar scored his hat-trick to put Pakistan ahead for the third time but Netherlands scored within the last five minutes from a short corner through Paul Litjens. The pulsating match was one of the best in the tournaments and Netherlands were lauded for their performance for keeping an unparalleled Pakistan team on bay despite not playing with their full strength squad.

17 October 1971

Pakistan	3–3	Netherlands
Dar 8', 43', 62'	Report	Spits 13', 48'; Litjens 65'

Real Club de Polo, Barcelona

1971 FIH Hockey World Cup
Pool match

=== 1978 World Cup Final ===
Pakistan and Netherlands met in the World Cup final for the first time in the fourth World Cup in Buenos Aires, 1978. Pakistan had earlier beaten Netherlands 3–1 in a pool match and were unbeaten in the tournament. From a tense battle of skill and attrition, Pakistan emerged 3-2 winners over Netherlands in the final. Pakistan scored first through Akhtar Rasool from a penalty comer but the Dutch soon equalized with Ties Kruise converting a penalty stroke. Early in the second half, Paul Litjens scored for Netherlands from a long comer but Pakistan battled for the equalizer eventually to obtain it through lslahuddin from a scramble. A late matchwinner was obtained by Rana Ehsanullah from a penalty comer. So, Pakistan became the first team to win the cup for the second time, with the record of eight wins in eight matches for a total of thirty five goals.

“ The victory that day was the most special moment of my life and it was possible because of the prayers of the nation.
It was my second World Cup triumph after having won the competition in 1971 as a player. But the victory was special because in Buenos Aires, I was the captain of the team.”

— Islahuddin Siddique, Source

2 April 1978

Pakistan	3–2	Netherlands
Rasool 2'; Islahuddin 46'; Ehsanullah 63'	Report	Kruize 9'; Litjens 40'

Campo Argentino de Polo, Buenos Aires

1978 FIH Hockey World Cup
Final

=== 1982 Champions Trophy ===
The third edition of the Hockey Champions Trophy was held in Amstelveen, Netherlands. Pakistan were also the reigning World Champions winning the 1982 World Cup in Mumbai and the Asian Cup on home soil months later. They had lost only once in 23 matches before the match Pakistan and Netherlands were the only team in position to win the tournament. Netherlands went on to win the match by scoring seven goals. At half-time Netherlands had a 4–1 lead Ties Kruize twice from the short-corner, Tom Van't Hek and Roderik Bouwman scored once to give Netherlands a 4–0 lead within twenty six minutes. Pakistan scored through Hassan Sardar two minutes before half-time to reduce the margin. Kruize maintained his excellent form in the second half scoring a hat-trick in the second half only scoring five goals in total and giving his team a resounding 7–2 victory, defending their title from a year earlier. Pakistan eventually slumped to fourth place with this defeat.

13 June 1982

Netherlands	7–2	Pakistan
Kruize 4', 14', 39', 56', 61'; Van 't Hek 11'; Bouwman 26'	Report	Sardar 33'; Manzoor Jr. 69'

Wagener, Amstelveen

1982 Hockey Champions Trophy
Round-robin fifth match

=== 1990 World Cup Final ===
On 23 February 1990 a crowd of nearly 70,000 witnessed the Seventh World Cup final between Pakistan and Netherlands at the National Hockey Stadium at Lahore. In the throbbing final scene there could hardly have been a better start for Pakistan than a goal In the fifth minute by Shahbaz Ahmed who picked up a center from Farhat Khan and gave the goalkeeper Frank Leistra no chance from close range. The stands erupted and the chanting spurred Pakistan on to greater endeavour. But the roar was reduced to a whisper when Tom Van't Hek forced a penalty corner in the twelfth minute and a silence followed when Floris Jan Bovelander landed a stunning shot on the target. Two minutes later Netherlands was awarded another penalty comer and Bovelander's shot glanced off the front foot of the goalkeeper Mansoor Ahmed to soar into the net. In the last ten minutes before the interval Pakistan's forwards doubled their effort with Tahir Zaman and Shahbaz putting the Dutch defence under pressure, but two minutes into the second half. Weterings at outside left. seized on a center by Marc Delissen and drove an unstoppable shot into the goal. Netherlands won the match 3–1, their second title after 1973.

23 February 1990

Netherlands	3–1	Pakistan
Bovelander 12', 14'; Weterings 37'	Report	Shahbaz Sr. 5'

National Hockey Stadium, Lahore

1990 FIH Hockey World Cup
Final

=== 1992 Olympic bronze medal ===
Pakistan and Netherlands progressed for the semifinals from their group for the 1992 Olympics in Terrassa. Pakistan defeated Netherlands 3–2 to top the group but both teams lost the semifinals, Australia defeated Netherlands 3-2 and Pakistan lost to Germany in extra time. This made for another match between the two for the bronze medal, it was the third time both played each other in a medal match at the Olympics each time for a bronze medal. The Dutch were 2-0 up against Pakistan in the men's bronze medal match. However, smarting from losing to Germany in the semi-finals and being seen somewhat as the ‘people's favourite’ for the title, Pakistan succeeded with a superb late fightback. Pakistan rallied to score four goals in the last fifteen minutes to cap a sensational fightback, winning 4–3. Netherlands looked to be in control after taking a 2–0 lead with goals by Marc Delissen and Stephan Veen. Only eighteen minutes were left when Pakistan struck two telling blows with goals by Muhammad Shahbaz and Khalid Bashir from a penalty corners. The flames of interest were kindled a new and Pakistan went ahead when Qamar Ibrahim scored. Khalid crashed home another goal from a penalty corner for a 4 -2 lead and in the dying seconds Gijs Weterings. the Dutch outside left brought a bizarre match to a close by cutting Pakistan's advantage to 4–3. Shahbaz Ahmed was instrumental in the play creating many chances of which Pakistan scored the much needed goals.

8 August 1992

Netherlands	3–4	Pakistan
Delissen 20'; Veen 22'; Weterings 69'	Report	Shahbaz Jr. 55'; Bashir 63', 68'; Qamar 67'

Estadi Olímpic de Terrassa, Terrassa

1992 Summer Olympics
Third and fourth place

=== 1994 World Cup Final ===
Pakistan and Netherlands again met in the World Cup final in 1994 at Sydney. Pakistan held such command in the second half but match ended a draw and penalty strokes were imposed. Three chances were missed in quick succession by Tahir Zaman, Kamran Ashraf and Asif Bajwa. The scoring was done in the first half Bovelander putting Netherlands ahead in the seventeenth minute but the lead lasted only four minutes with Kamran deflecting a shot by Asif Bajwa into the net. Netherlands was awarded a goal claimed to have been scored by Delissen from a long corner. But the Spanish umpire Santiago Deo intervened explaining that the ball had been deflected into the goal by a Pakistani defender's stick and the Australian umpire Don Prior reversed his decision. The match ended 1-1, In the penalty shoot-out Mansoor Ahmed first saved a shot of Bovelander putting Muhammad Shafqat Malik of Pakistan to score from his stroke and win the World Cup for Pakistan but he missed. The following shot Mansoor again made the decisive save off Jeroen Delmee as he had done in the semi-final against Germany. Pakistan won their record fourth title, Shahbaz Ahmed was voted as player of the tournament for the second straight edition. Hundreds of Pakistan supporters poured on to the Homebush pitch proclaiming Pakistan as champions again.

4 December 1994

Netherlands	1–1	Pakistan
Bovelander 17'	Report	Ashraf 21'
Penalties
Van den Honert (penalty shoot-out scored); Bovelander (penalty shoot-out missed); Delissen (penalty shoot-out scored); Brinkman (penalty shoot-out scored); Delmee (penalty shoot-out missed)	3–4	(penalty shoot-out scored) Shahbaz Sr. (penalty shoot-out scored) Shahbaz Jr. (penalty shoot-out scored) Zaman; (penalty shoot-out scored) Usman; (penalty shoot-out missed) Shafqat

Homebush Stadium, Sydney

1994 FIH Hockey World Cup
Final
