= Field hockey at the 1970 Asian Games =

- Venue: National Stadium, Pathum Wan, Bangkok, Thailand
- Dates: 10 December 1970 – 19 December 1970
- Nations: 8

Field hockey was contested for men only at the 1970 Asian Games in Bangkok, Thailand. The champions were decided in the final minutes of the 10-day event as Pakistan scored a solitary goal in extra time for a 1–0 win against India.

== Medalists ==
Event	Gold	Silver	Bronze
Men	Pakistan; Ashfaq Ahmed; Riaz Ahmed; Gulraiz Akhtar; Saeed Anwar; Muhammed Aslam Arayin; Jahangir Butt; Tanvir Dar; Akhtar-ul-Islam; Sami Khan; Khalid Mahmood; Muhammad Asad Malik; Riazuddin Moghal; Abdul Rashid; Fazal-ur-Rehman; Shahnaz Sheikh; Zahid Sheikh; Saleem Sherwani; Islahuddin Siddiquee	India; Charles Cornelius; M. P. Ganesh; B. P. Govinda; Balbir Singh Grewal; Ashok Kumar; Vinod Kumar; Cedric Pereira; Krishnamurthy Perumal; Ajit Pal Singh; Baldev Singh; Harbinder Singh; Harcharan Singh; Harmik Singh; Kulwant Singh; Major Singh; Mukhbain Singh; Mohinder Singh; Uthiah	Japan; Saburo Amemiya; Susumu Chiba; Masaji Fuji; Shunji Furuta; Toshiaki Ichinose; Kazuo Kawamura; Kyoichi Nagaya; Hideji Okabe; Satokazu Otsuka; Haruo Satake; Norio Takahashi; Michinori Ueda; Akihito Wada

== Draw ==
Group A

- India
- Malaysia
- ~~South Korea~~*
- Singapore
- ~~Indonesia~~*

Group B

- Pakistan
- Japan
- Ceylon*
- Hong Kong
- Thailand

* South Korea and Indonesia withdrew, Ceylon moved to Group A to balance the number of teams in each group.

== Results ==
=== Preliminary round ===
==== Group A ====
Team	Pld	W	D	L	GF	GA	GD	Pts
India	3	3	0	0	15	0	+15	6
Malaysia	3	2	0	1	8	2	+6	4
Singapore	3	0	1	2	0	8	−8	1
Ceylon	3	0	1	2	0	13	−13	1

10 December

Ceylon	0–0	Singapore

National Stadium, Bangkok

11 December

Malaysia	7–0	Ceylon

National Stadium, Bangkok

12 December

India	7–0	Singapore

National Stadium, Bangkok

13 December

India	6–0	Ceylon

National Stadium, Bangkok

14 December

Malaysia	1–0	Singapore

National Stadium, Bangkok

15 December

India	2–0	Malaysia

National Stadium, Bangkok

==== Group B ====
Team	Pld	W	D	L	GF	GA	GD	Pts
Pakistan	3	2	1	0	13	0	+13	5
Japan	3	2	0	1	4	3	+1	4
Thailand	3	0	2	1	1	4	−3	2
Hong Kong	3	0	1	2	1	12	−11	1

10 December

Hong Kong	1–1	Thailand

National Stadium, Bangkok

11 December

Japan	1–0	Hong Kong

National Stadium, Bangkok

12 December

Pakistan	3–0	Japan

National Stadium, Bangkok

13 December

Pakistan	10–0	Hong Kong

National Stadium, Bangkok

14 December

Japan	3–0	Thailand

National Stadium, Bangkok

15 December

Pakistan	0–0	Thailand

National Stadium, Bangkok

=== Consolation round ===
Semifinals
16 December
Singapore	3
Hong Kong	1
16 December
Thailand	0
Ceylon	1

5th place match
18 December
Singapore	2
Ceylon	0
7th place match
18 December
Hong Kong (p)	0 (5)
Thailand	0 (3)

==== Semifinals ====
16 December

Singapore	3–1	Hong Kong

National Stadium, Bangkok

16 December

Thailand	0–1	Ceylon

National Stadium, Bangkok

==== 7th place match ====
18 December

Hong Kong	0–0 (a.e.t.)	Thailand
Penalties
	5–3

National Stadium, Bangkok

==== 5th place match ====
18 December

Singapore	2–0	Ceylon

National Stadium, Bangkok

=== Final round ===
Semifinals
17 December
Pakistan	5
Malaysia	0
17 December
India	1
Japan	0

Final
19 December
Pakistan (a.e.t.)	1
India	0
Bronze medal match
19 December
Malaysia	0
Japan	1

==== Semifinals ====
17 December

Pakistan	5–0	Malaysia

National Stadium, Bangkok

17 December

India	1–0	Japan

National Stadium, Bangkok

==== Bronze medal match ====
19 December

Malaysia	0–1	Japan

National Stadium, Bangkok

==== Final ====
19 December

Pakistan	1–0 (a.e.t.)	India

National Stadium, Bangkok

== Final standing ==
Rank	Team	Pld	W	D	L
1st place, gold medalist(s)	Pakistan	5	4	1	0
2nd place, silver medalist(s)	India	5	4	0	1
3rd place, bronze medalist(s)	Japan	5	3	0	2
4	Malaysia	5	2	0	3
5	Singapore	5	2	1	2
6	Ceylon	5	1	1	3
7	Hong Kong	5	0	2	3
8	Thailand	5	0	3	2
