= Field hockey at the 1974 Asian Games =

- Venue: Aryamehr Hockey Field
- Dates: 6–15 September
- Nations: 6

The Field hockey events at the 1974 Asian Games were held in Tehran, Iran between 6 September and 15 September 1974.

Pakistan won the gold medal after beating India in the gold medal match.

== Medalists ==
Event	Gold	Silver	Bronze
Men	Pakistan; Shaukat Saleem Siddiqui; Muhammad Azam; Arshad Chaudhury; Manzoor-ul-Hassan; Shamim Ilyas; Muhammad Saeed Khan; Samiullah Khan; Arshad Mahmood; Saleem Nazim; Qayyum Niazi; Abdul Rashid; Akhtar Rasool; Shahnaz Sheikh; Zahid Sheikh; Saleem Sherwani; Islahuddin Siddiquee; Iftikhar Syed; Hidayat Ullah; Munawwaruz Zaman	India; Vasudevan Baskaran; John Correia; Leslie Fernandez; M. P. Ganesh; B. P. Govinda; Aslam Sher Khan; Mehboob Khan; Ashok Kumar; K. N. Kusha; Victor Philips; Surjit Singh Randhawa; Ajit Singh; Ajit Pal Singh; Baldev Singh; Chand Singh; Harcharan Singh; Harmik Singh; Varinder Singh	Malaysia; K. Balasingam; Murugesan Mahendran; Mohd Anwar Nor; Len Oliveiro; Ow Soon Kooi; Nallasamy Palanisamy; Ramalingam Pathmarajah; Poon Fook Loke; K. T. Rajan; Ramakrishnan Rengasamy; Sri Shanmuganathan; Savinder Singh; Brian Sta Maria; Wong Choon Hin; Azraai Zain; Khairuddin Zainal

== Results ==
Team	Pld	W	D	L	GF	GA	GD	Pts
Pakistan	5	4	1	0	35	1	+34	9
India	5	4	1	0	25	1	+24	9
Malaysia	5	2	1	2	15	6	+9	5
Japan	5	2	1	2	8	6	+2	5
Sri Lanka	5	1	0	4	11	29	−18	2
Iran	5	0	0	5	1	52	−51	0

All times are Iran Standard Time (UTC+03:30)

6 September
13:30

Malaysia	9–0	Iran

Aryamehr Hockey Field, Tehran

6 September
13:30

Japan	1–0	Sri Lanka

Aryamehr Hockey Field, Tehran

7 September
15:30

India	Suspended	Sri Lanka

Aryamehr Hockey Field, Tehran

- Due to stormy weather, the match was abandoned with India leading 6–0; The replay was scheduled for 11 September.

7 September
15:30

Pakistan	Suspended	Iran

Aryamehr Hockey Field, Tehran

- Due to stormy weather, the match was abandoned with Pakistan leading 4–0; The replay was scheduled for 11 September.

8 September
15:30

Pakistan	4–0	Malaysia
Sheikh 2'; Rasool ?', ?'; Manzoor Sr. 55'	Report

Aryamehr Hockey Field, Tehran

8 September
16:00

India	3–0	Japan
Randhawa ?', ?'; Govinda ?'	Report

Aryamehr Hockey Field, Tehran

9 September
15:30

Japan	7–0	Iran

Aryamehr Hockey Field, Tehran

9 September
15:30

Malaysia	6–0	Sri Lanka

Aryamehr Hockey Field, Tehran

10 September
15:30

India	12–0	Iran

Aryamehr Hockey Field, Tehran

10 September
15:30

Pakistan	14–0	Sri Lanka

Aryamehr Hockey Field, Tehran

11 September
9:30

India	7–0	Sri Lanka

Aryamehr Hockey Field, Tehran

11 September
9:30

Pakistan	13–0	Iran

Aryamehr Hockey Field, Tehran

12 September
15:30

Pakistan	3–0	Japan

Aryamehr Hockey Field, Tehran

12 September
16:00

India	2–0	Malaysia

Aryamehr Hockey Field, Tehran

13 September
15:30

Japan	0–0	Malaysia

Aryamehr Hockey Field, Tehran

13 September
16:00

Sri Lanka	11–1	Iran

Aryamehr Hockey Field, Tehran

14 September
15:30

Pakistan	1–1	India
Rasool 26'	Report	AP Singh 62'

Aryamehr Hockey Field, Tehran

- Since both Malaysia and Japan were tied on points, a play-off game was played to decide the 3rd team.

14 September
10:00

Malaysia	3–1	Japan
Loke 37', ?'; Mahendran ?'	Report	Takakura

Aryamehr Hockey Field, Tehran

- Since both Pakistan and India were tied on points, a play-off game was played to decide the gold medalist.

15 September
10:00

Pakistan	2–0	India
Manzoor Sr. 6'; Munawwar uz Zaman 45'	Report

Aryamehr Hockey Field, Tehran

== Final standing ==
Pos	Team	Pld	W	D	L
1st place, gold medalist(s)	Pakistan	6	5	1	0
2nd place, silver medalist(s)	India	6	4	1	1
3rd place, bronze medalist(s)	Malaysia	6	3	1	2
4	Japan	6	2	1	3
5	Sri Lanka	5	1	0	4
6	Iran	5	0	0	5
