= Hockey at the 1972 Olympics =

Hockey at the 1972 Olympics may refer to:

- Ice hockey at the 1972 Winter Olympics
- Field hockey at the 1972 Summer Olympics
