= Pitau =

Pitau is a surname. Notable people with the surname include:

- Erick Pitau (1952–1999), French field hockey player
- Nicolas Pitau (1632–1671), Flamish-born French engraver
- Ōtene Pītau (1834–1921), New Zealand Māori leader
- Romain Pitau (born 1977), French football manager and former player
