= De Cruz =

De Cruz is a surname. Notable people with the surname include:

- Andrea De Cruz (born 1974), Singaporean actress and psychologist
- Franco De Cruz (born 1946), Malaysian field hockey player
- Helen De Cruz (1978–2025), Belgian philosopher

== See also ==
- Ileana D'Cruz (born 1986), Portuguese actress
- Peter de Cruz (born 1990), Swiss curler
- Simon Tensing de Cruz (born 1954), Singaporean diplomat
- De la Cruz, people with this surname
