= Detlev Kittstein =

German field hockey player

Olympic medal record

Men's field hockey

Representing West Germany
Gold medal – first place	1972 Munich	Team competition

Detlev Kittstein (24 February 1944 in Sprottau – 3 May 1996 in Frankfurt) was a German field hockey player who competed in the 1968 Summer Olympics and in the 1972 Summer Olympics.
