= Francis Coutou =

French field hockey player (1947–2019)

Personal information
- Nationality: French
- Born: 15 March 1947
- Died: 17 January 2019 (aged 71)

Sport
- Sport: Field hockey

Francis Coutou (15 March 1947 – 17 January 2019) was a French field hockey player. He competed in the men's tournament at the 1972 Summer Olympics.
