= Henryk Grotowski =

Polish field hockey player

Personal information
- Nationality: Polish
- Born: 9 March 1949 Gniezno, Poland
- Died: 11 April 2019 (aged 70)

Sport
- Sport: Field hockey

Henryk Grotowski (9 March 1949 – 11 April 2019) was a Polish field hockey player. He competed in the men's tournament at the 1972 Summer Olympics.
