= Stanisław Kasprzyk =

Polish hockey player (1942–2022)

Personal information
- Nationality: Polish
- Born: 7 November 1942 Gniezno, Poland
- Died: 23 September 2022 (aged 79)

Sport
- Sport: Field hockey

Stanisław Kasprzyk (7 November 1942 – 23 September 2022) was a Polish field hockey player. He competed in the men's tournament at the 1972 Summer Olympics.

He died on 23 September 2022, at the age of 79.
