= Jean-Luc Darfeuille =

French hockey player

Personal information
- Nationality: French
- Born: 27 January 1949 (age 77)

Sport
- Sport: Field hockey

Jean-Luc Darfeuille (born 27 January 1949) is a French field hockey player. He competed in the men's tournament at the 1972 Summer Olympics.
