= Baldev Singh (field hockey) =

Indian field hockey player

Personal information
- Born: 23 August 1951 (age 74) Punjab, India

Sport
- Sport: Field hockey
Medal record
Men's field hockey
Representing India
Hockey World Cup
Bronze medal – third place	1971 Barcelona	Team
Silver medal – second place	1973 Amsterdam	Team
Asian Games
Silver medal – second place	1970 Bangkok	Team
Silver medal – second place	1974 Tehran	Team

Baldev Singh (born 23 August 1951) is an Indian field hockey player. He competed in the men's tournament at the 1976 Summer Olympics.
