= Kyoichi Nagaya =

Japanese field hockey player

Personal information
- Nationality: Japanese
- Born: 17 November 1948 (age 77) Gifu, Japan

Sport
- Sport: Field hockey
Medal record
Representing Japan
Asian Games
Bronze medal – third place	1970 Bangkok	Team

Kyoichi Nagaya (born 17 November 1948) is a Japanese field hockey player. He competed in the men's tournament at the 1968 Summer Olympics.
