= Stanisław Kaźmierczak (field hockey) =

Polish field hockey player

Personal information
- Nationality: Polish
- Born: 5 March 1950 (age 76) Poznań, Poland

Sport
- Sport: Field hockey

Stanisław Kaźmierczak (born 5 March 1950) is a Polish field hockey player. He competed in the men's tournament at the 1972 Summer Olympics.
