= John French (field hockey) =

British hockey player

Personal information
- Born: 26 July 1946 (age 80) Romford, England
- Height: 175 cm (5 ft 9 in)
- Weight: 66 kg (146 lb)

Sport
- Sport: Field hockey
- Position: Centre forward
Senior career
Years	Team	Caps	Goals
1968–1974	Tulse Hill	-	-
National team
Years	Team	Caps	Goals
–	England & Great Britain		-

John Colin French (born 26 July 1946) is a British former field hockey player who competed in the men's tournament at the 1972 Summer Olympics.

== Biography ==
French was a centre forward and represented Essex at county level.

He made his England debut on 29 March 1969 against Wales.

After retiring with 77 international caps, French continued to play hockey at masters level and helped England win the Grand Masters Hockey World Cup in Hong Kong. He was also the vice president of Old Southendians Hockey Club.
