= Philippe Collin =

Belgian hockey player

Personal information
- Nationality: Belgian
- Born: 13 July 1946 (age 79) Anderlecht, Belgium

Sport
- Sport: Field hockey

Philippe Collin (born 13 July 1946) is a Belgian former field hockey player and busisnessman. He competed in the men's tournament at the 1972 Summer Olympics.

He also served as secretary-general of football club RSC Anderlecht from 1996 through late 2017, having joined the club while his uncle Constant Vanden Stock was its chairman. He held the function of chairman of the technical commission of the Belgian FA from 2009 until 2016 as well.
