= Surjit Singh Rihal =

Kenyan field hockey player

Surjit Singh Rihal (ਸੁਰਜੀਤ ਸਿੰਘ ਰੀਹਾਲ)
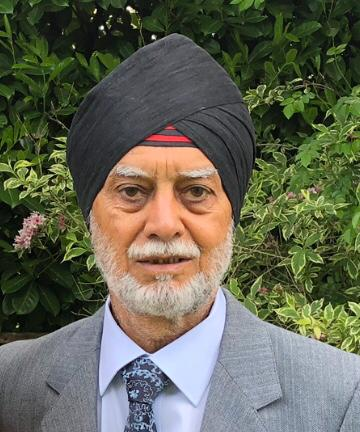
- Surjit Singh Rihal in 2023

Personal information
- Nationality: (East Africa Protectorate) British Kenyan (1948-1963) (Kenya) Kenyan (1963-Present)
- Born: 14 November 1948 (age 77) Nairobi, British Kenya

Sport
- Sport: Field hockey
- Position: Centre-half
- Club: Simba Union, Nairobi

Surjit Singh Rihal (born 14 November 1948) is a Kenyan field hockey player.

== Olympics ==
He was a member of the Kenya field hockey team that participated in the men's tournament at the 1972 Summer Olympics. He was captain of the Kenya field hockey team that went to participate in men's tournament at the 1976 Summer Olympics. However, Kenya along with other African nations boycotted the Montreal Olympics for political reasons at the eleventh hour.

== World Cup ==
Rihal was a member of Kenya field hockey team that participated in 1971 Men's Hockey World Cup held at Barcelona, Spain. Kenya stood fourth in this tournament. He was captain of the Kenya field hockey team that participated in 1973 Men's Hockey World Cup held at Amstelveen, Netherlands.
