= Carsten Keller =

German field hockey player (born 1939)

Olympic medal record

Men's field hockey

Representing West Germany
Gold medal – first place	1972 Munich	Team competition

Carsten Keller (born 8 September 1939) is a former field hockey player from West-Germany, who won a gold medal for his native country at the 1972 Summer Olympics in Munich. He played 133 international matches for Germany, and retired after the Munich Games. Keller then became a hockey coach.

Three of his children also played hockey at the highest level, and all were strikers. Andreas became Olympic champion in 1992 (Barcelona), after securing silver at the two previous Olympics in Los Angeles (1984) and Seoul (1988). Natascha competed in four Olympics, and also won a gold medal at the 2004 Summer Olympics in Athens. Florian won a gold medal at the 2008 Summer Olympics in Beijing.

Carsten Keller's father Erwin grabbed a silver medal in the same sport at the 1936 Summer Olympics in Berlin.
