= Kuldip Singh Bhogal =

Ugandan field hockey player

Personal information
- Nationality: Ugandan
- Born: 4 March 1950 (age 76)

Sport
- Sport: Field hockey
- Club: Simba Union, Kampala

Kuldip Singh Bhogal (born 4 March 1950) is a Ugandan field hockey player. He competed in the men's tournament at the 1972 Summer Olympics. He is the brother of Ugandan hockey international player Ajit Singh Bhogal.
