= Ulrich Klaes =

German field hockey player (born 1946)

Olympic medal record

Men's Field Hockey

Representing West Germany
Gold medal – first place	1972 Munich	Team competition

Ulrich Klaes (born 1 February 1946 in Essen) is a former field hockey player from Germany, who was a member of the West German squad that won the gold medal at the 1972 Summer Olympics in Munich.
