= Hockeyanlage =

Field hockey venue in Munich, Germany

Coordinates: 48°11′03″N 11°32′38″E

The Hockeyanlage was a temporary field hockey venue located at Olympiapark in Munich, Germany. The venue hosted the field hockey competitions for the 1972 Summer Olympics.

The venue consisted of an area 95,000 square metres (1,020,000 square feet), including six playing fields of 101.4 metres (111 yards) long by 61 metres (67 yards) wide with one training venue of the same dimensions. The grandstands had capacity for 10,000 spectators at the main field and 5,000 at the second field; the other playing fields had smaller stands.
