= Ajit Singh Bhogal =

Ugandan field hockey player

Personal information
- Nationality: Ugandan
- Born: 5 November 1942 (age 83)

Sport
- Sport: Field hockey
- Club: Simba Union, Kampala

Ajit Singh Bhogal (born 5 November 1942) is a Ugandan field hockey player. He competed in the men's tournament at the 1972 Summer Olympics. He is the brother of Ugandan hockey international player Kuldip Singh Bhogal.
