= Aleksander Wrona =

Polish field hockey player (1940–2022)

Personal information
- Nationality: Polish
- Born: 11 May 1940 Wróblowice, Poland
- Died: 19 September 2022 (aged 82)

Sport
- Sport: Field hockey

Aleksander Wrona (11 May 1940 – 19 September 2022) was a Polish field hockey player. He competed in the men's tournament at the 1972 Summer Olympics. Honoured Master of Sport of Poland.

He died on 19 September 2022, at the age of 82.
