= Włodzimierz Matuszyński =

Polish hockey player

Personal information
- Nationality: Polish
- Born: 8 August 1948 (age 77) Poznań, Poland

Sport
- Sport: Field hockey

Włodzimierz Matuszyński (born 8 August 1948) is a Polish field hockey player. He competed in the men's tournament at the 1972 Summer Olympics.
