= Erick Pitau =

French field hockey player

Personal information
- Nationality: French
- Born: 14 March 1952
- Died: 6 May 1999 (aged 47)

Sport
- Sport: Field hockey

Erick Pitau (14 March 1952 – 6 May 1999) was a French field hockey player. He competed in the men's tournament at the 1972 Summer Olympics.
