= Joe Ahmad =

British field hockey player (born 1942)

Personal information
- Full name: Sheikh Mahmood Ahmad
- Born: 25 June 1942 (age 84)
- Height: 177 cm (5 ft 10 in)
- Weight: 63 kg (139 lb)

Sport
- Sport: Field hockey
- Position: Midfield
Senior career
Years	Team	Caps	Goals
1962–1971	Lincoln Imps	-	-
1971–1973	R.A.F.	-	-
1973–1974	Blackheath	-	-
National team
Years	Team	Caps	Goals
–	England	44	-
–	Great Britain	11	-

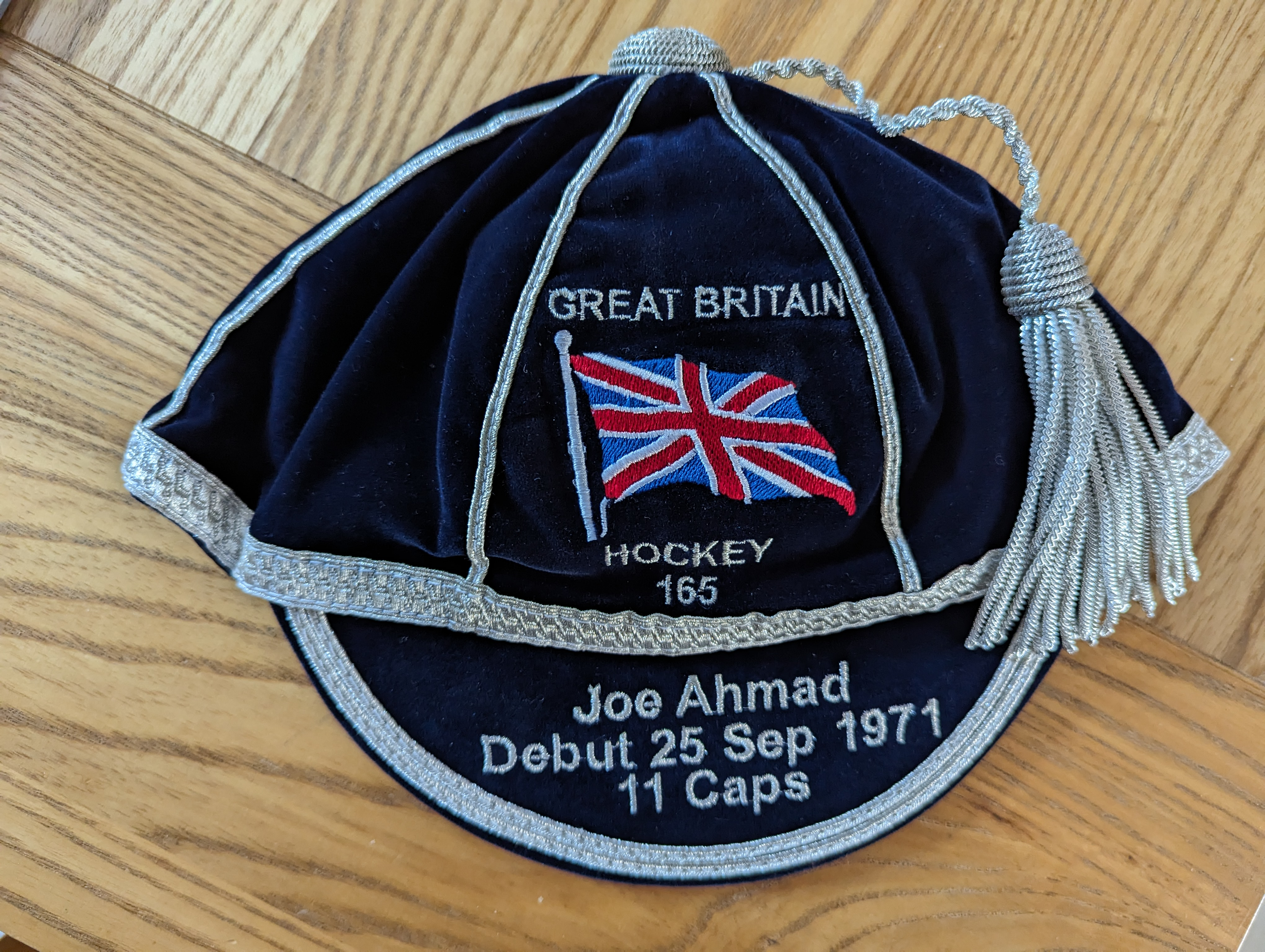
Mahmood's Great Britain Cap

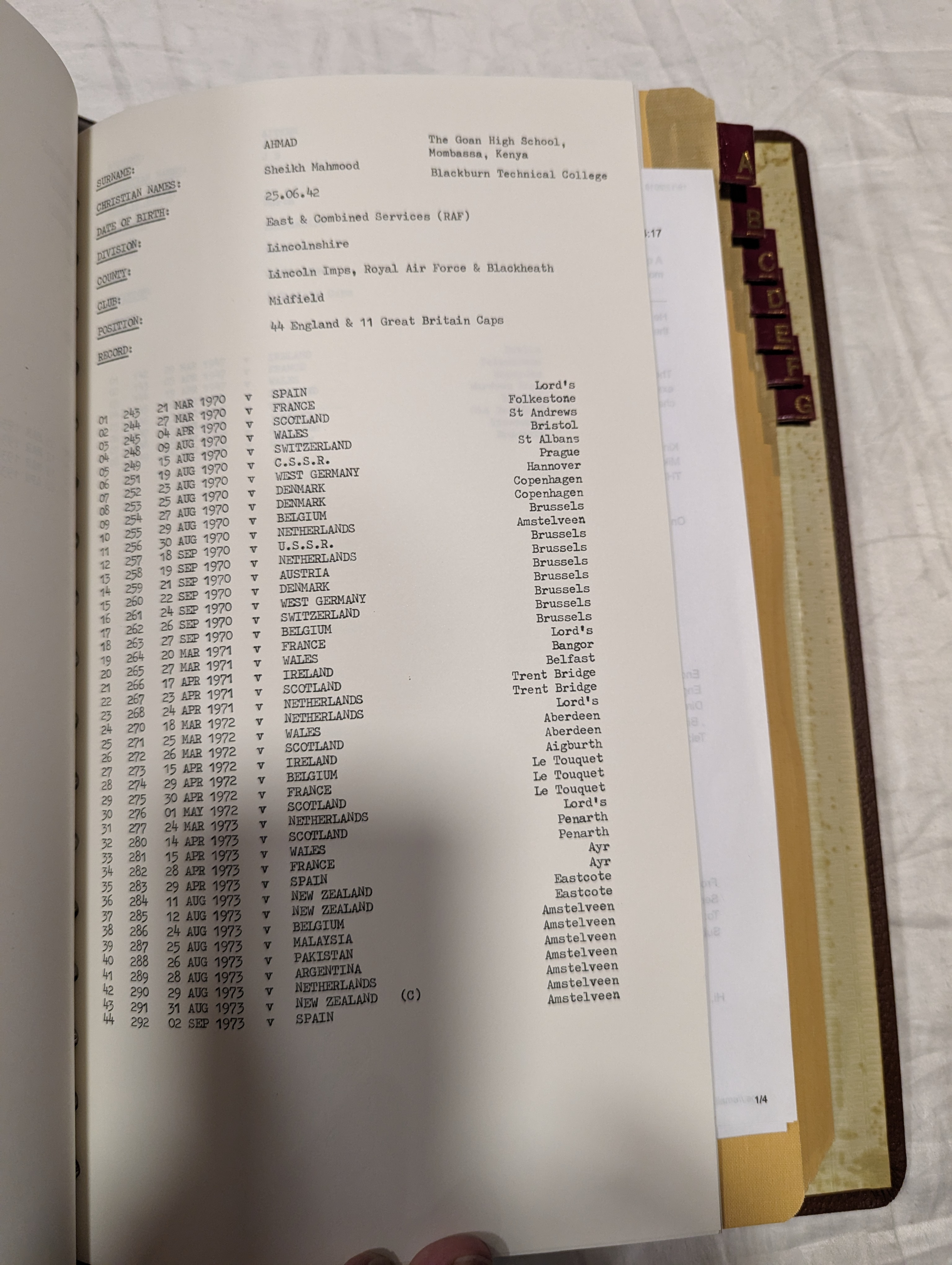
Mahmood's England record

Sheikh Mahmood "Joe" Ahmad (born 25 June 1942) is a British former field hockey player who competed in the 1972 Summer Olympics.

== Biography ==
Ahmad was educated at Mombasa Goan School in Kenya and Blackburn Technical College. He played club hockey for Lincoln Imps and was with them when he competed in 1970 Men's EuroHockey Nations Championship. He then represented the Royal Air Force being called up for the 1972 Olympic Games in Munich.

He joined Blackheath Hockey Club and while at Blackheath he competed for England in the 1973 Hockey World Cup.

He played for Great Britain 11 times and England 44 times in the midfield position.

In 2022 after an appeal to locate Mahmood by the National Hockey Museum was successful, he was able to receive, thanks to the research from the dedicated staff at the museum, his commemorative cap recognising his appearances for the Great Britain team officially noting his number as 165.

After leaving his playing days behind him, Mahmood took up a coaching position with the Oman Hockey Association coaching the national men's team.

Mahmood can now be found enjoying retirement in the Greek island of Corfu.
