= Harmik Singh =

Indian field hockey player

Medal record

Men's field hockey

Representing India

Olympic Games
Bronze medal – third place	1968 Mexico	Team
Bronze medal – third place	1972 Munich	Team

Hockey World Cup
Bronze medal – third place	1971 Barcelona	Team
Silver medal – second place	1973 Amsterdam	Team

Asian Games
Gold medal – first place	1966 Bangkok	Team
Silver medal – second place	1970 Bangkok	Team
Silver medal – second place	1974 Tehran	Team

Harmik Singh (born 10 June 1945) is a former captain of the Indian field hockey team and coach. He played for India in many tournaments including the 1968 and 1972 Summer Olympics. He was awarded the Arjuna Award for his achievements. Singh is the brother of Ajit Singh, and the uncle of later Indian international Gagan Ajit Singh. He was born in Gujranwala, Punjab. He was the head coach of the India hockey team at the 1982 and 1986 Hockey World Cup.
