= Mukhbain Singh =

Indian field hockey player (born 1944)

Medal record

Men's field hockey

Representing India

Olympic Games
Bronze medal – third place	1972 Munich	Team

Asian Games
Silver medal – second place	1970 Bangkok	Team

Mukhbain Singh (born 12 December 1944) is an Indian field hockey player. He won the bronze medal at the 1972 Summer Olympics in Munich where he scored 9 goals in total of 9 Olympic matches.

== Early life and education ==
Singh was born in village Shatab Garh, Punjab Province, British India (now in Pakistan). The son of S. Darbara Singh and Surinder Kaur, who migrated to Gurdaspur after the partition of India in 1947. He has a brother (also a former international hockey player) and two sisters. He passed matriculation from Guru Nanak Khalsa High School, Batala (Punjab, India).

== Career ==
Singh started playing hockey from an early age. While playing for his school, he was selected in the district team and from there was selected in the Punjab team. After that he joined Indian Railways in 1965 as a sub-inspector (RPF) against sports quota.

=== International career ===
While playing in the Nehru Cup for Railways in 1965, he was selected in the Indian team for test matches against Japan. He officially joined Railways in 1966 and after that he played many international tournaments including the Munich Olympics, where he was the vice-captain of the Indian team scoring total of 9 goals in that Olympics. He also played in the 1970 Asian Games.

== International events ==
- Played test matches against Japan, 1965
- Played international hockey tournament held at Hamburg (West Germany), 1966
- Standby in Asian Games, 1966
- Played pre-Olympic hockey tournament at London, 1967
- Played international hockey tournament at Madrid (Spain), 1967
- Played test matches against Holland and East Germany, 1967
- Toured Ceylon (Sri Lanka), 1967
- Played test matches against Kenya, 1969
- Played Asian Games held at Bangkok, 1970 (silver medal)
- Played Olympic Games held at Munich (West Germany), 1972
- Vice-Captain of the Indian hockey team.
- Top scorer from the Indian side and the third highest scorer in the Olympic Games with 9 goals, including his hat-trick against Australia and three goals against England and also scored the winning goal against Holland in the bronze medal match.

== Achievements ==
- Won best Sports person of the year award from Railways in 1973.
- Won Dhyan Chand award for his lifetime achievements by the President of India in 2008.
