= Charles Pous =

French field hockey player

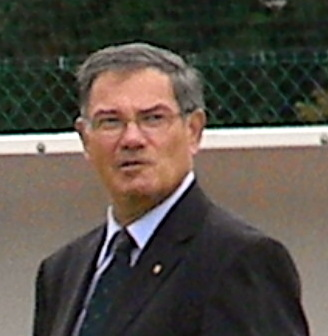
- Charles Pous in 2013

Personal information
- Nationality: French
- Born: 7 January 1949 Lyon, France
- Died: 29 July 2015 (aged 66) Lyon, France

Sport
- Sport: Field hockey

Charles Pous (7 January 1949 – 29 July 2015) was a French field hockey player. He competed at the 1968 Summer Olympics and the 1972 Summer Olympics.
