= José Alustiza =

Spanish field hockey player (1947–1990)

Personal information
- Nationality: Spanish
- Born: 3 September 1947 Gipuzkoa, Spain
- Died: 1990 (aged 43)

Sport
- Sport: Field hockey

José Alustiza (3 September 1947 – 1990) was a Spanish field hockey player. He competed in the men's tournament at the 1972 Summer Olympics.
