= Kulwant Singh (field hockey) =

Indian field hockey player

Medal record

Representing India

Men's Field hockey

Olympic Games
Bronze medal – third place	1972 Munich	Team

Hockey World Cup
Bronze medal – third place	1971 Barcelona	Team

Asian Games
Silver medal – second place	1970 Bangkok	Team

Kulwant Singh (born 18 December 1948) is an Indian field hockey player. He won a bronze medal at the 1972 Summer Olympics in Munich. He resided in Italy following his hockey career.
