= Ramalingam Pathmarajah =

Malaysian field hockey player (born 1948)

Personal information
- Nationality: Malaysian
- Born: 14 February 1948 (age 78) Married = [ [Jane Frances Das]] Children = [Sonia Pathmarajah] [Shakira Pathmarajah] [Shiresh Pathmarajah] [Pahang]

Sport
- Sport: Field hockey
Medal record
Men's field hockey
Representing Malaysia
Asian Games
Bronze medal – third place	1974 Tehran	Team

Ramalingam Pathmarajah (born 14 February 1948) is a Malaysian field hockey player. He competed at the 1972 Summer Olympics and the 1976 Summer Olympics.
