= Carl-Eric Vanderborght =

Belgian field hockey player

Personal information
- Nationality: Belgian
- Born: 7 May 1951 (age 74)

Sport
- Sport: Field hockey

Carl-Eric Vanderborght (born 7 May 1951) is a Belgian field hockey player. He competed at the 1972 Summer Olympics and the 1976 Summer Olympics.
