= Michael Krause =

German field hockey player (1946–2024)

Olympic medal record

Men's field hockey

Representing West Germany
Gold medal – first place	1972 Munich	Team competition

Michael Krause (24 July 1946 – 23 June 2024) was a German field hockey player who competed in the 1968 Summer Olympics, in the 1972 Summer Olympics, and in the 1976 Summer Olympics. Krause died on 23 June 2024, at the age of 77.
