= Nusrat Iqbal Sahi =

Pakistani sprinter (born 1950)

Personal information
- Nationality: Pakistani
- Born: 14 March 1950 (age 76)

Sport
- Sport: Sprinting
- Event: 200 metres
Medal record
Men's athletics
Representing Pakistan
Asian Games
Bronze medal – third place	1974 Tehran	200m

Nusrat Iqbal Sahi (born 14 March 1950) is a Pakistani sprinter. He competed in the men's 200 metres at the 1972 Summer Olympics. He won the bronze medal in 200 m event at the 1974 Asian Games.

== See also ==
- List of Pakistani records in athletics
- Athletics in Pakistan
- Pakistan at the Olympics
