= Poon Fook Loke =

Malaysian field hockey player (born 1951)

Personal information
- Nationality: Malaysian
- Born: 30 May 1951 (age 75)

Sport
- Sport: Field hockey
Medal record
Men's field hockey
Representing Malaysia
Asian Games
Bronze medal – third place	1974 Tehran	Team

Poon Fook Loke (born 30 May 1951) is a Malaysian field hockey player. He competed at the 1976 Summer Olympics and the 1984 Summer Olympics. Poon was part of the legendary Malaysian team that finished fourth in the 1975 World Cup, a feat that remains unparalleled to this day.
