= Franco De Cruz =

Malaysian field hockey player (born 1946)

Franco D’Cruz
Personal information
- Nationality: Malaysian
- Born: 22 November 1946 (age 79)

Sport
- Sport: Field hockey

Franco D’Cruz (born 22 November 1946) is a Malaysian field hockey player. He competed in the men's tournament at the 1972 Summer Olympics.
