= Mombasa Goan School =

The Mombasa Goan School was a prominent educational institution in the port city of Kenya, which was attended by a number of expatriates mainly from the Goan community of Kenya in the early to mid twentieth century. It is currently known as the Sacred Heart School.

== Location and role ==
The school is located at the intersection between Archbishop Makarios and Liwatoni roads. The school helped Goan expats get a local education, instead of having to send their children back to boarding schools in Goa or elsewhere. The school was once noted for its academic excellence. Its students were prominent particularly in the fields of law and medicine in Kenya.

== History ==
The school was founded in 1932.

The school's origins are seen in the appeal made by Monsignor De Courmont of the Holy Ghost Fathers in Zanzibar, to George McKinnon, the Managing Director of IBEAC (Imperial British East Africa Company), in 1887 to provide a "little school" for their Goan employees.

The school was launched after the Mombasa Liwali (ruler) Sir Ali bin Salim granted land to the Goan community, and laid the school's foundation stone on August 14, 1932. The Portuguese also funded the expansion of the school.

By 1934, the Goans' Overseas Association, an organisation of Goans in the diaspora, was able to provide the Goan community with a full primary school, including two kindergarten classes. The number of pupils was 1870 in the year 1935, and fees ranged from Shs.5/- to Shs.9/-, with an allowance if more than one child in the family studied there.

== Recent changes ==
In 1961, with British rule ending, political changes transformed the community school, and its name too was changed to Sacred Heart. The Goan community handed over the public school to the Catholic Church in Mombasa.

In 2012, the primary school had 1,014 students, and over 600 studied in its secondary, all sharing a small compound.

== Asian schools in colonial Kenya ==
Gergory notes that, following Asian migration to East Africa under the British colonial policy, there had been early Asian communal schools in Kenya, set up between 1890 and 1951. These schools represented Muslims (Bohras, Ithnasheris, Ismailis, Memons, Sunnis), Hindus (Arya Samaj, the Shree Sanatan Dharam Sabha, Cutch Gujarat Hindu Union, Gujarati Balmandir, Ardasha Vidyalaya, Gujarati), Jains (Visa Oshwal), Sikh, and Goan. The first Goan school was set up in 1928 in Nairobi and was a mixed primary.

== Prominent individuals ==
One of the prominent individuals attached to the school (as a teacher) was the Goan litterateur Suresh Amonkar, who translated religious texts from many faiths and even a Shakespearean play into Devanagari Konkani. Bishop Agnelo Gracias was also part of the school. Amonkar was Very active in theatre and produced and directed the Greek play Antigone. Its lead actors Peter George, Amina Sangrar, and Philip Zimmerlin. The play was performed at the Goan Institute, Mombasa.
