= José María Mascaro =

Mexican field hockey player (born 1947)

José María Mascaro (born 8 July 1947) is a Mexican former field hockey player who competed in the 1972 Summer Olympics.
