= Stefan Otulakowski =

Polish hockey player

Personal information
- Nationality: Polish
- Born: 28 August 1945 (age 80) Poznań, Poland

Sport
- Sport: Field hockey

Stefan Otulakowski (born 28 August 1945) is a Polish field hockey player. He competed in the men's tournament at the 1972 Summer Olympics.
