= Patrick Gillard =

Belgian hockey player (1947–2021)

Personal information
- Nationality: Belgian
- Born: 20 September 1947
- Died: 4 January 2021 (aged 73)

Sport
- Sport: Field hockey

Patrick Gillard (20 September 1947 – 4 January 2021) was a Belgian field hockey player. He competed in the men's tournament at the 1972 Summer Olympics.
