= Murugesan Mahendran =

Malaysian field hockey player (born 1947)

Personal information
- Nationality: Malaysian
- Born: 9 March 1947 (age 79)

Sport
- Sport: Field hockey
Medal record
Men's field hockey
Representing Malaysia
Asian Games
Bronze medal – third place	1974 Tehran	Team

Murugesan Mahendran (born 9 March 1947) is a Malaysian field hockey player. He competed at the 1972 Summer Olympics and the 1976 Summer Olympics.
