= Juan Amat =

Spanish field hockey player (1946–2022)

Personal information
- Born: 10 July 1946 Terrassa, Barcelona, Spain
- Died: 12 May 2022 (aged 75) Terrassa, Barcelona, Spain
Medal record
Men's Field hockey
Representing Spain
Olympic Games
Silver medal – second place	1980 Moscow	Team competition

Juan Amat Fontanals (10 July 1946 – 12 May 2022) was a Spanish field hockey player. He won the silver medal with the men's national team at the 1980 Summer Olympics in Moscow. There, he was top scorer of the tournament with sixteen goals, including fourteen penalty corners.

Amat competed in four Olympics for Spain, starting in 1968. A player for Egara, he was the brother of Francisco Amat, Jaime Amat, and Pedro Amat.
