= Patrick Burtschell =

French hockey player

Personal information
- Nationality: French
- Born: 22 September 1946 (age 79) Lille, France

Sport
- Sport: Field hockey

Patrick Burtschell (born 22 September 1946) is a French field hockey player. He competed at the 1968 Summer Olympics and the 1972 Summer Olympics.
