= Frans Spits =

Dutch field hockey player

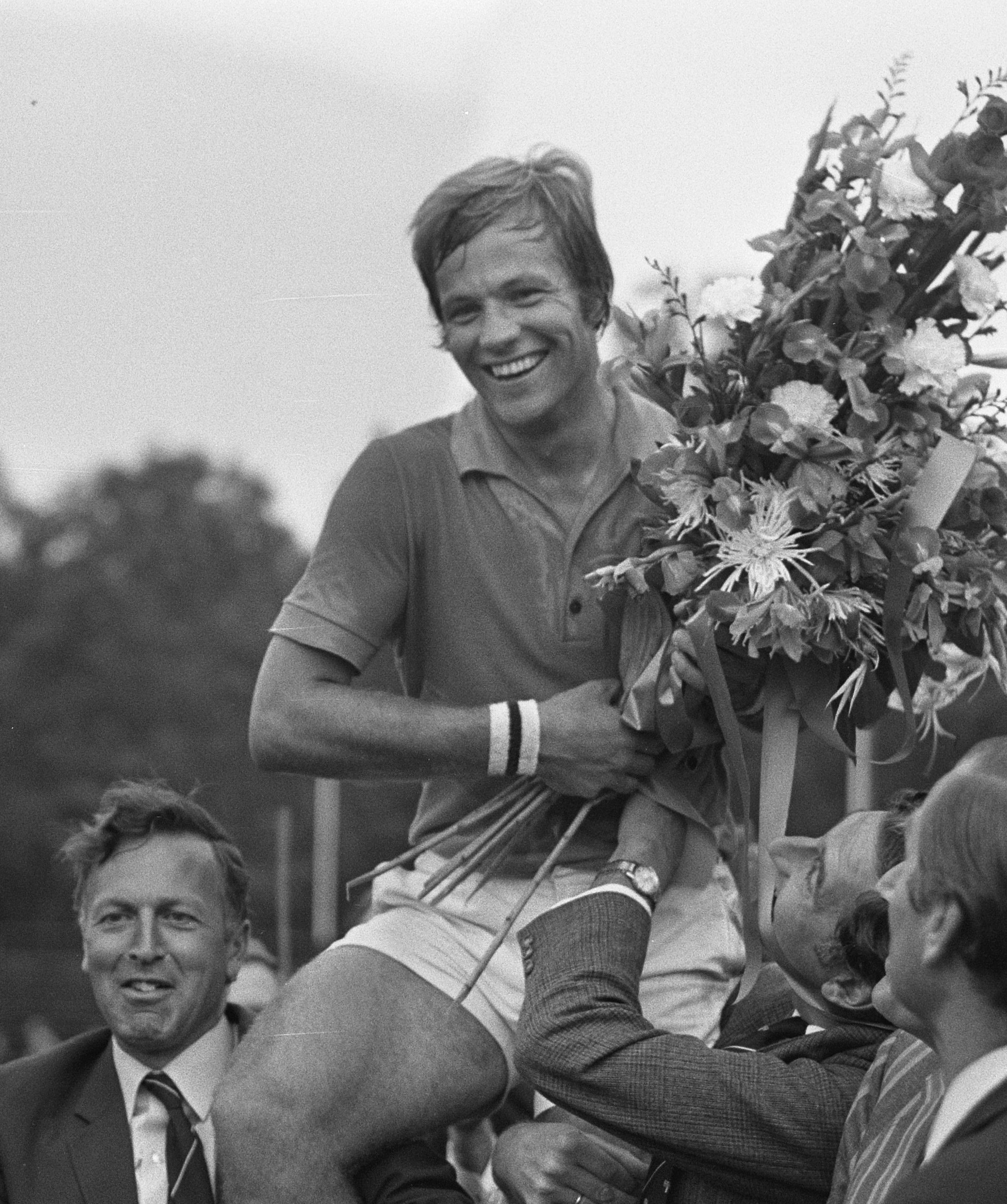
- Frans Spits in 1973

Personal information
- Born: 13 June 1946 (age 80) Amstelveen, Netherlands
- Height: 1.77 m (5 ft 10 in)
- Weight: 76 kg (168 lb)

Sport
- Sport: Field hockey
- Club: AB&HC, Amsterdam

Frans Gerhard Spits (born 13 June 1946) is a retired field hockey player from the Netherlands. He competed at the 1964 and 1972 Summer Olympics and finished in fifth and fourth place, respectively. In 1972, he played alongside his elder brother Nico Spits.

Together with his brother he was part of the Dutch team that won the 1973 Men's Hockey World Cup.

Frans was the first Dutch hockey player to reach the mark of 100 international caps for the Netherlands, in the game against Malaysia (4-0 won) on August 28, 1973. He continued to play and reached a total of 121 international games of the Netherlands.
