= Wolfgang Baumgart =

German field hockey player

Olympic medal record

Men's field hockey

Representing West Germany
Gold medal – first place	1972 Munich	Team competition

Wolfgang Baumgart (23 October 1949 in Inheiden – 21 February 2011) was a German field hockey player who competed in the 1968 Summer Olympics and in the 1972 Summer Olympics.
