= Alfredo Quaquarini =

Argentine field hockey player

Personal information
- Nationality: Argentine
- Born: 29 March 1952 (age 74)

Sport
- Sport: Field hockey

Alfredo Quaquarini (born 29 March 1952) is an Argentine field hockey player. He competed at the 1968 Summer Olympics, the 1972 Summer Olympics and the 1976 Summer Olympics.
