= Rainer Seifert =

Field hockey player

Olympic medal record

Men's Field Hockey

Representing West Germany
Gold medal – first place	1972 Munich	Team competition

Rainer Seifert (born 10 December 1947 in Wiesbaden) is a former field hockey player from Germany, who was a member of the West German squad that won the gold medal at the 1972 Summer Olympics in Munich.
