= José Miguel Huacuja =

Mexican field hockey player (born 1950)

José Miguel Huacuja (born 1 July 1950) is a Mexican former field hockey player who competed in the 1972 Summer Olympics.
