= James Mason (field hockey) =

Australian field hockey player (born 1947)

Personal information
- Born: 19 June 1947 (age 79)
Medal record
Men's field hockey
Representing Australia
Olympic Games
Silver medal – second place	1968 Mexico City	Team competition

James Robert Mason (born 19 June 1947) is an Australian field hockey player from Townsville, who won the silver medal with the Men's National Team at the 1968 Summer Olympics in Mexico City.
