= Jorge Sabbione =

Argentine hockey player

Personal information
- Nationality: Argentine
- Born: 16 April 1948
- Died: 10 October 2022 (aged 74)

Sport
- Sport: Field hockey

Jorge Sabbione (16 April 1948 – 10 October 2022) was an Argentine field hockey player. He competed at the 1968 Summer Olympics, the 1972 Summer Olympics and the 1976 Summer Olympics.
