= Witold Ziaja =

Polish field hockey player (1940–2025)

- Born: 16 November 1940; Siemianowitz-Laurahütte, Gau Silesia, Germany
- Died: 1 September 2025 (aged 84); Hamburg, Germany
- Occupation: Hockey player

Witold Ziaja (16 November 1940 – 1 September 2025) was a Polish field hockey player who competed in the 1960 Summer Olympics and in the 1972 Summer Olympics.

== Biography ==
Ziaja was born in Siemianowice Śląskie on 16 November 1940. He played 79 international matches for Poland, and scored a total number of 18 goals. Throughout his career Ziaja played for HKS Siemianowiczanka from Siemianowice Śląskie.

After his active career he became a hockey coach. He guided the Austrian Women's Hockey Team in 1973, the Polish Men's National Team from 1974 to 1980, and the Swiss Men's National team from 1981 to 1983.

Ziaja lived in Hamburg, Germany until his death on 1 September 2025, at the age of 84.
