= Akhtar-ul-Islam =

Pakistani Olympian Field Hockey player

Akhtar ul Islam اختر الاسلام
Personal information
- Nationality: (United Kingdom) British Indian (1947) (Pakistan) Pakistani (1947-present)
- Born: 1 January 1947 Jabalpur, British Raj

Sport
- Country: Pakistan
- Sport: Field hockey
Medal record
Men's field hockey
Representing Pakistan
Olympic Games
Silver medal – second place	1972 Munich	Team competition
Hockey World Cup
Gold medal – first place	1971 Barcelona	Team
Asian Games
Gold medal – first place	1970 Bangkok	Team competition

Olympian Akhtar ul Islam (اختر الاسلام; born 1 January 1947) is a Pakistani former field hockey player of the Pakistan national team from 1967 to 1975. He is best known for scoring the goal in the final of the inaugural Hockey World Cup held in Spain in 1971. This goal proved to be the decider of the game, giving Pakistan the distinction of being the first nation to win the Hockey World Cup.

Akhtar ul Islam was positioned in the defensive line, being known as 'the lion' due to his strong built, making it difficult for opposing team members to make their way past him.

In 2006, he was appointed the general secretary of the Pakistan Hockey Federation and later on a selector for Pakistan field hockey team.

Akhtar ul Islam is the younger brother of another hockey player Khursheed Aslam.
