= Greg Dayman =

Field hockey player

Olympic medal record

Representing New Zealand

Men's field hockey
Gold medal – first place	Montreal 1976	Team competition

Gregory John Dayman (born 21 February 1947 in Wellington) is a former New Zealand field hockey player who was a member of the national team that won the golden medal at the 1976 Summer Olympics in Montreal.

Dayman made his debut for the Black Sticks in 1969 and was a regular feature for New Zealand over the next decade, participating as vice captain in the 1972 Munich Olympics where they finished 9th and going on to win gold at the 1976 Olympics in Montreal. He was named captain of the 1980 Olympic team, however New Zealand boycotted the games that year.
