= Saeed Anwar (field hockey) =

Pakistani field hockey player (1943–2004)

Personal information
- Born: Saeed Anwar; 14 October 1943 Sheikhupura, Punjab Province, British India (now Pakistan)
- Died: 15 July 2004 (aged 60) Sheikhupura, Punjab, Pakistan
- Height: 170 cm (5 ft 7 in)
- Weight: 157 lb (71 kg)

Sport
- Sport: Field hockey
- Position: Left-half
National team
Years	Team	Caps	Goals
1964–1972	Pakistan	24	(3)
Medal record
Men's field hockey
Representing Pakistan
Olympic Games
Gold medal – first place	1968 Mexico City	Team competition
Silver medal – second place	1964 Tokyo	Team competition
Silver medal – second place	1972 Munich	Team competition
Asian Games
Gold medal – first place	1970 Bangkok	Team competition
Silver medal – second place	1966 Bangkok	Team competition

Saeed Anwar (October 14, 1943 – July 15, 2004) was a Pakistani field hockey player and coach. He was born in Sheikhupura. He won a gold medal at the 1968 Summer Olympics in Mexico City, and silver at the 1964 and 1972 Summer Olympics.

Anwer subsequently coached Pakistan's senior and junior field hockey teams. Saeed was affectionately known as 'Ustad' ("master") in the hockey circles, for his innovations and useful tips that he passed on to future hockey greats, including Shahnaz Sheikh, Abdul Rashid Jr., and Hanif Khan.
