= Muhammad Asad Malik =

Pakistani field hockey player

Personal information
- Nationality: (United Kingdom) British Indian (1941-1947) (Pakistan) Pakistani (1947-2020)
- Born: 30 October 1941
- Died: 27 July 2020 (aged 78)

Sport
- Sport: Field hockey
- Position: Left-in
Medal record
Representing Pakistan
Olympic Games
Gold medal – first place	1968 Mexico City	Team competition
Silver medal – second place	1972 Munich	Team competition
Silver medal – second place	1964 Tokyo	Team competition
Asian Games
Gold medal – first place	1970 Bangkok	Team competition
Gold medal – first place	1962 Jakarta	Team competition
Silver medal – second place	1966 Bangkok	Team competition

Muhammad Asad Malik (30 October 1941 – 27 July 2020) was a Pakistani field hockey player. A former captain of Pakistan national team, he is remembered as "a brilliant dribbler" and "a fine inside left".

He won a silver medal at the 1964 Summer Olympics in Tokyo, a gold medal at the 1968 Summer Olympics in Mexico City, and another silver medal at the 1972 Summer Olympics in Munich.

Malik was an integral part of the Pakistani team that became Olympic champions at Mexico City 1968. He scored the winning goal in the final against Australia, with Pakistan claiming a 2-1 victory. The action photograph of his gold medal-winning goal against Australia in the 1968 final was immortalised on a Pakistan postage stamp.

Asad also represented Pakistan in the 1971 and 1973 Hockey World Cups, winning the gold medal in the inaugural 1971 edition of the tournament.

Asad's family has also produced three other Olympians, all in field hockey. His younger brother Saeed Anwar, and nephews Anjum Saeed and Naeem Amjad have all played for Pakistan.

== Death ==
Malik died in a road accident on 27 July 2020, at the age of 78. “We have lost a true legend of hockey today," Asian Hockey Federation President Dato Fumio Ogura said on Malik's passing.

== Awards and recognition ==
- Pride of Performance Award by the President of Pakistan in 1969
