= Zahid Sheikh =

Pakistani field hockey player

Medal record

Men's field hockey

Representing Pakistan

Olympic Games
Silver medal – second place	1972 Munich	Team competition

Asian Games
Gold medal – first place	1970 Bangkok	Team competition
Gold medal – first place	1974 Tehran	Team competition

Muhammad Zahid Sheikh (December 14, 1949 – January 29, 2010) was a field hockey player who played for the Pakistan National Hockey Team from 1969 to 1976. He was born at Sialkot. He was capped 34 times and scored 8 goals. He is the Uncle (Chacha gee) of field hockey star Olympions Shahnaz Sheikh and Tariq Sheikh.
