= Muhammad Ashfaq =

Pakistani field hockey player (1946–2005)

Personal information
- Born: 11 November 1946 Rawalpindi, Punjab, British India
- Died: 3 July 2005 (aged 58) Rawalpindi, Punjab, Pakistan
- Resting place: Alif Shah Graveyard, Rawalpindi, Punjab, Pakistan
- Height: 162 cm (5 ft 4 in)
- Weight: 62 kg (137 lb)

Sport
- Sport: Field hockey
Medal record
Men's field hockey
Representing Pakistan
Olympic Games
Gold medal – first place	1968 Mexico City	Team competition
Asian Games
Gold medal – first place	1970 Bangkok	Team competition

Muhammad Ashfaq (November 11, 1946 – July 3, 2005) was a Pakistani field hockey player. He won a gold medal at the 1968 Summer Olympics in Mexico City.

== Death ==
He died on 3 July 2005 in Rawalpindi, Pakistan, and was buried in local Alif Shah Graveyard.
