= M. P. Ganesh =

Indian field hockey player

Personal information
- Full name: Mollera Poovaiah Ganesh
- Born: 8 July 1946 (age 80) Suntikoppa, Kodagu district, Karnataka, India
- Height: 5 ft 8 in (1.73 m)

Sport
- Sport: Field hockey
Senior career
Years	Team	Caps	Goals
1965 - 1973	Services	-	-
1974	Bombay	-	-
National team
Years	Team	Caps	Goals
1969 - 1974	India	100+	-
Medal record
Men's field hockey
Representing India
Olympic Games
Bronze medal – third place	1972 Munich	Team
Hockey World Cup
Bronze medal – third place	1971 Barcelona	Team
Silver medal – second place	1973 Amsterdam	Team
Asian Games
Silver medal – second place	1970 Bangkok	Team
Silver medal – second place	1974 Tehran	Team

Mollera Poovaiah Ganesh (born 8 July 1946) is a former Indian professional field hockey player and coach. He was also the captain and coach of the Indian team. He was awarded the Arjuna Award in 1973 and Padma Shri in 2020.

He was the head coach of the India hockey team at the 1990 Hockey World Cup.

== Personal life ==
Ganesh was born on 8 July 1946 in the Kodagu (earlier known as Coorg) district in Karnataka. He switched over to hockey when he joined the Indian Army and played in the hockey tournaments from 1966–1973. Ganesh has completed MA in English, Diploma in Sports Coaching from the National Institute of Sports, Patiala and Ph.D in Physical education. Ganesh has 5 siblings (one sister and four brothers) of which 2 brothers, M P Subbaiah and M P Kaveriappa have achieved great laurels in both Football and Hockey at All India and national levels.

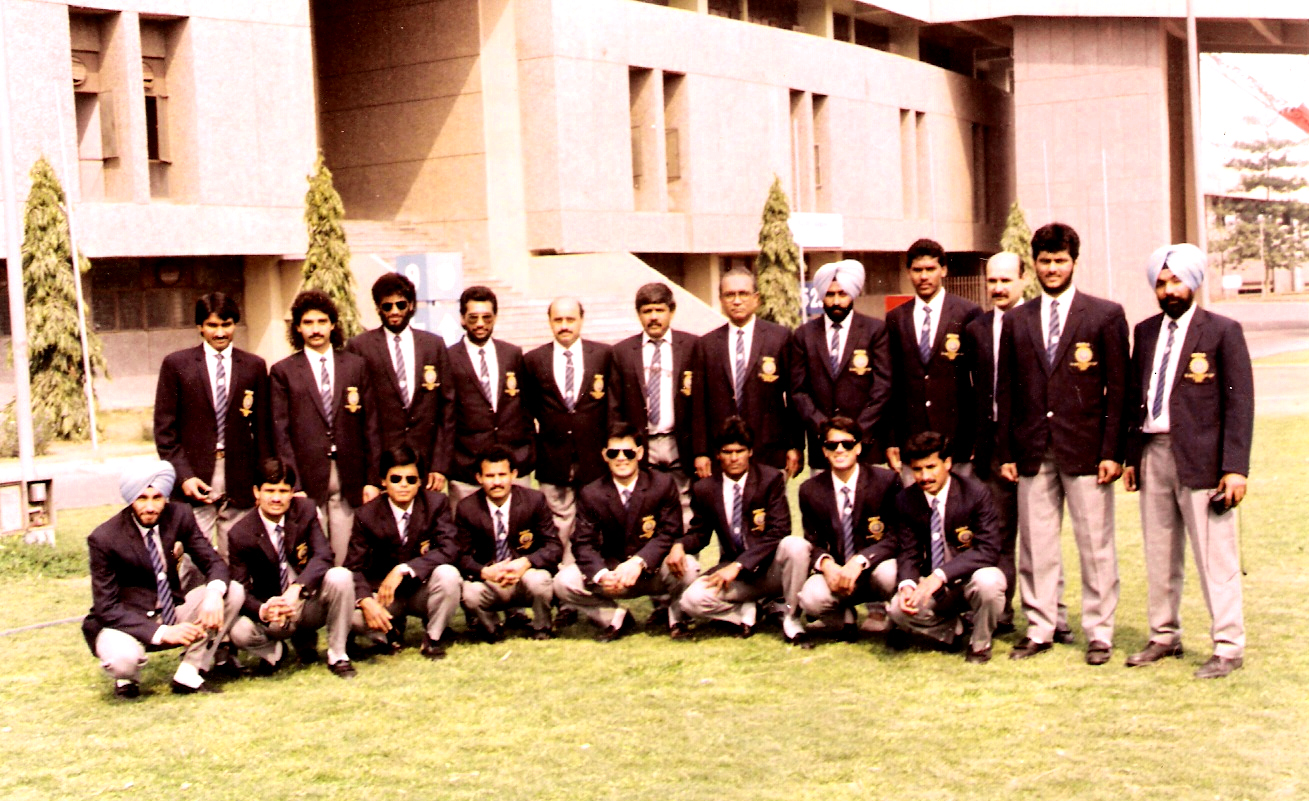
M. P. Ganesh (standing sixth from left) with the Indian hockey team, Seoul Olympics, 1988, as coach

== Awards ==
- Arjuna Award – 1973
- Silver Jubilee Sports Award of Karnataka – 1981
- Padma Shri award – 2020
