= Francisco Amat =

Spanish field hockey player (born 1943)

Personal information
- Nationality: Spanish
- Born: 21 March 1943 (age 83) Barcelona, Spain

Sport
- Sport: Field hockey

Francisco Amat (born 21 March 1943) is a Spanish field hockey player. He competed at the 1964 Summer Olympics, the 1968 Summer Olympics, and the 1972 Summer Olympics.
