= Iftikhar Ahmed Syed =

Pakistani field hockey player (born 1952)

Personal information
- Nationality: Pakistani
- Born: 23 August 1952 (age 73)

Sport
- Sport: Field hockey

Iftikhar Ahmed Syed (born 23 August 1952) is a Pakistani field hockey player. He competed at the 1972 Summer Olympics and the 1976 Summer Olympics, winning a silver and bronze medal respectively.
