= Jaime Amat =

Spanish field hockey player (1941–2020)

Personal information
- Nationality: Spanish
- Born: 1 September 1941 Barcelona, Spain
- Died: 18 February 2020 (aged 78)

Sport
- Sport: Field hockey

Jaime Amat (1 September 1941 – 18 February 2020) was a Spanish field hockey player. He competed at the 1964 and the 1972 Summer Olympics.
