= Riaz Ahmed =

Pakistani field hockey player (born 1941)

Personal information
- Born: 11 September 1941 (age 84) Rawalpindi, Punjab Province, British India
- Height: 150 cm (4 ft 11 in)
- Weight: 70 kg (154 lb)

Sport
- Sport: Field hockey
National team
Years	Team	Caps	Goals
–	Pakistan		-
Medal record
Men's field hockey
Representing Pakistan
Olympic Games
Gold medal – first place	1968 Mexico City	Team competition
Silver medal – second place	1972 Munich	Team competition

Riaz Ahmed (born 11 September 1941) is a Pakistani field hockey player. He won a gold medal at the 1968 Summer Olympics in Mexico City, and a silver medal at the 1972 Summer Olympics in Munich.
