= Nico Spits =

Dutch field hockey player

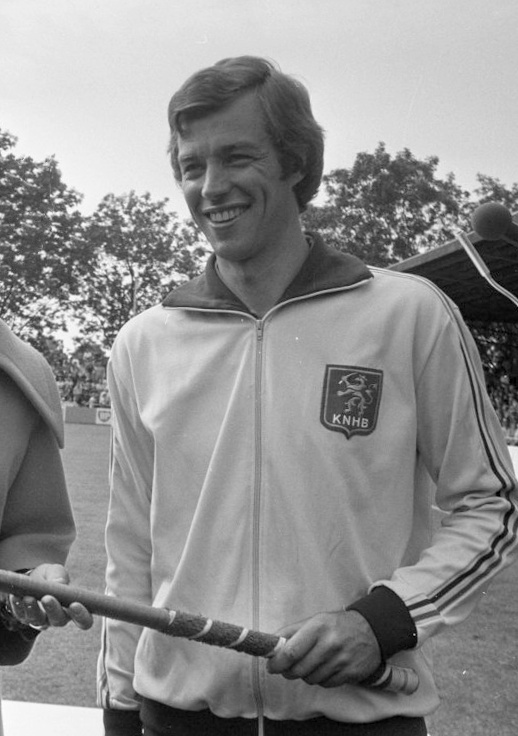
- Nico Spits in 1973

Personal information
- Born: 7 September 1943 (age 82) Amstelveen, Netherlands
- Height: 1.88 m (6 ft 2 in)
- Weight: 78 kg (172 lb)

Sport
- Sport: Field hockey
- Club: AB&HC, Amsterdam

Nicolaas Bernard "Nico" Spits (born 7 September 1943) is a retired field hockey player from the Netherlands. He competed at the 1964 and 1972 Summer Olympics and finished in seventh and fourth place, respectively. In 1972, he played alongside his younger brother, Frans Spits. He was the Olympic flag bearer for the Netherlands in 1972.

Together with his brother he was part of the Dutch team that won the 1973 Men's Hockey World Cup. He is the chairman of Orange All Stars, a club of the former international Dutch athletes who play semiprofessional golf.
