= Mudassar Asghar =

Pakistani hockey player (born 1947)

Personal information
- Nationality: Pakistani
- Born: 18 October 1947 (age 78)

Sport
- Sport: Field hockey

Mudassar Asghar (born 18 October 1947) is a Pakistani former field hockey player. He competed at the 1972 Summer Olympics and the 1976 Summer Olympics, winning a silver and bronze medal, respectively.
