= Fazalur Rehman (field hockey) =

Pakistani field hockey player (1941–2023)

Personal information
- Nationality: Pakistani
- Born: 15 March 1941 Abbottabad, Pakistan
- Died: 9 March 2023 (aged 81) Abbottabad, Khyber Pakhtunkhwa, Pakistan

Sport
- Sport: Field hockey
- Position: Left-half

Fazalur Rehman (Urdu: فضل الرحمان; 15 March 1941 – 9 March 2023) was a Pakistani field hockey player. He competed in men's tournament at the 1968 Summer Olympics in Mexico and was part of team that won gold medal. He competed in the men's tournament at the 1972 Summer Olympics, where Pakistan won the silver medal.

Pakistan was the first nation to bag three gold medals in the grand slams of field hockey — at the Olympics (1968), the World Cup (1971) and the Asian Games (1970). Fazalur Rahman was a member of all these squads and was regarded as one of Pakistan’s greatest hockey players.

He died on 9 March 2023, at the age of 81.
