= Abdul Rashid (field hockey, born 1947) =

Pakistani field hockey player (1947–2020)

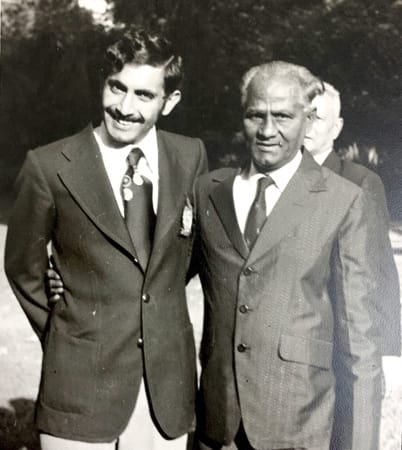
- Rashid Junior (left) with Dhyan Chand

Personal information
- Full name: Abdul Rashid
- Nationality: Pakistani
- Born: 3 March 1947 Ghoriwala, Bannu, North-West Frontier Province, British India
- Died: 4 November 2020 (aged 73) Shifa International Hospital, Islamabad, Pakistan
- Resting place: Judge Kila Graveyard, Ghoriwala, District Bannu, Pakistan)

Sport
- Sport: Field hockey
- Position: Centre-forward
Medal record
Representing Pakistan
Olympic Games
Gold medal – first place	1968 Mexico City	Team competition
Silver medal – second place	1972 Munich	Team competition
Bronze medal – third place	1976 Montreal	Team competition

Abdul Rashid, known as Rashid Junior, (3 March 1947 – 4 November 2020) was a Pakistani field hockey player. He competed at the 1968 Summer Olympics, the 1972 Summer Olympics and the 1976 Summer Olympics. He was part of the gold, silver and bronze winning teams at those Olympics, respectively. He died on 4 November 2020, and was buried in his ancestral town Bannu.

Abdul Rashid played hockey from 1968 to 1976. During these years, he won seven gold medals, three silver and one bronze medal. He also captained Pakistan to victory in the International Hockey Tournament at Christchurch in 1974. Rashid Junior played 90 international matches and scored around 100 goals. He was the lone scorer in the final against India in the 1970 Asian Games hockey tournament in Bangkok. Rashid Junior also participated in three Olympics—Mexico City (1968), Munich (1972) and Montreal (1976), besides the Inaugural Cup at Barcelona (1971). Rashid Junior was the brother of former Pakistan field hockey captain and Olympian Abdul Hamid Hamidi.

On 23 March 1995, Rashid Junior was awarded the Presidential Pride of Performance by President Farooq Leghari.
