= Field hockey at the 1972 Summer Olympics – Men's team squads =

List of hockey players

The following is the list of squads that took place in the men's field hockey tournament at the 1972 Summer Olympics.

== Argentina ==
The following players represented Argentina:

- Ernesto Barreiros
- Fernando Calp
- Julio César Cufre
- Flavio de Giacomi
- Gerardo Lorenzo
- Héctor Marinoni
- Osvaldo Monti
- Jorge Piccioli
- Daniel Portugués
- Alfredo Quaquarini
- Horacio Rognoni
- Julio Segolini
- Alberto Sabbione
- Jorge Sabbione
- Gabriel Scally
- Ovidio Sodor

== Australia ==
The following players represented Australia:

- Brian Glencross
- Robert Haigh
- Robert Andrew
- Greg Browning
- Ric Charlesworth
- Paul Dearing
- Tom Golder
- Wayne Hammond
- James Mason
- Terry McAskell
- Patrick Nilan
- Desmond Piper
- Graeme Reid
- Ronald Riley
- Donald Smart
- Ronald Wilson

== Belgium ==
The following players represented Belgium:

- Jean-Marie Buisset
- Carl-Eric Vanderborght
- Marc Legros
- Eric Stoupel
- Charly Bouvy
- Michel De Saedeleer
- Patrick Gillard
- Daniel Dupont
- Jean-Claude Moraux
- Jean-François Gilles
- Philippe Collin
- Jean Toussaint
- Raoul Ronsmans
- Armand Solie
- Michel Deville
- Guy Miserque
- Jean-André Zembsch

== France ==
The following players represented France:

- Jean-Paul Sauthier
- Gilles Capelle
- Patrick Burtschell
- Pierre Roussel
- Georges Corbel
- Charles Pous
- Marc Chapon
- Christian Honneger
- Marc Remise
- Olivier Moreau
- Georges Grain
- Francis Coutou
- Erick Pitau
- Yves Langlois
- Thierry Havet
- Jean-Luc Darfeuille
- Alain Tétard

== Great Britain ==
The following players represented Great Britain:

- Austin Savage
- Peter Mills
- Paul Svehlik
- Rui Saldanha
- Tony Ekins
- Keith Sinclair
- Bernie Cotton
- Joe Ahmad
- Dennis Hay
- Richard Oliver
- Michael Crowe
- Terry Gregg
- Michael Corby
- Graham Evans
- John French
- Christopher Langhorne
- Peter Marsh

== India ==
The following players represented India:

- Manuel Frederick
- Mukhbain Singh
- Michael Kindo
- Varinder Singh
- Ajitpal Singh
- Harmik Singh
- Ganesh Mollerapoovayya
- Harbinder Singh
- Kulwant Singh
- Ashok Kumar
- Harcharan Singh
- Charles Cornelius
- Krishnamurty Perumal
- Govinda Billimogaputtaswamy
- Victor Philips
- Vece Paes

== Kenya ==
The following players represented Kenya:

- Amarjeet Singh Marwa
- Jagmel Singh Rooprai
- Avtar Singh Sohal
- Harvinder Singh Marwa
- Surjit Singh Rihal
- Resham Singh Baines
- Jagjeet Singh Kular
- Davinder Singh Deegan
- Leo Fernandes
- Brajinder Singh Daved
- Tarlochan Singh Chana
- Philip D'Souza
- Surjeet Singh Panesar
- Mohamed Ajmal Malik
- Harvinder Pal Singh Sibia
- Renny Pereira
- Silvester Ashioya
- Ranjit Singh Sehmi

== Malaysia ==
The following players represented Malaysia:

- Khair-ud-Din bin Zainal
- Francis Belavantheran
- Sri Shanmuganathan
- Brian Santa Maria
- Phang Poh Meng
- Wong Choon Hin
- Balasingam Singaram
- Sayed Samat
- Sulaiman Saibot
- Franco De Cruz
- Murugesan Mahendran
- Harnahal Singh Sewa
- Yang Siow Ming
- Omar Mohamed Razali Yeop
- Ramalingam Pathmarajah

== Mexico ==
The following players represented Mexico:

- David Sevilla
- Noel Gutiérrez
- Orlando Ventura
- Javier Varela
- Manuel Fernández
- Héctor Ventura
- José Miguel Huacuja
- Oscar Huacuja
- Adán Noriega
- José María Mascaro
- Francisco Ramírez
- Enrique Filoteo
- Víctor Contreras
- Rubén Vasconcelos
- José Luis Partida
- Manuel Noriega
- Juan Calderón

== Netherlands ==
The following players represented the Netherlands:

- André Bolhuis
- Marinus Dijkerman
- Thijs Kaanders
- Coen Kranenberg
- Ties Kruize
- Wouter Leefers
- Flip van Lidth le Jeude
- Paul Litjens
- Irving van Nes
- Maarten Sikking
- Frans Spits
- Nico Spits
- Bart Taminiau
- Kik Thole
- Piet Weemers
- Jeroen Zweerts

== New Zealand ==
The following players represented New Zealand:

- Jeff Archibald
- Thur Borren
- Jan Borren
- John Christensen
- Greg Dayman
- Chris Ineson
- Ross McPherson
- Barry Maister
- Selwyn Maister
- Arthur Parkin
- Ramesh Patel
- Alan Patterson
- Kevin Rigby
- Ted Salmon
- Warwick Wright

== Pakistan ==
The following players represented Pakistan:

- Salim Sherwani
- Munawwaruz Zaman
- Saeed Anwar
- Akhtar Rasool
- Fazalur Rehman
- Mudassar Asghar
- Islah-ud-Din
- Abdul Rashid
- Muhammad Asad Malik
- Shahnaz Sheikh
- Akhtarul Islam
- Riaz Ahmed
- Iftikhar Ahmed Syed
- Muhammad Zahid Sheikh
- Jahangir Butt

== Poland ==
The following players represented Poland:

- Zbigniew Łój
- Ryszard Twardowski
- Stefan Otulakowski
- Zbigniew Juszczak
- Witold Ziaja
- Stanisław Kaźmierczak
- Jerzy Choroba
- Aleksander Wrona
- Henryk Grotowski
- Józef Wybieralski
- Włodzimierz Matuszyński
- Aleksander Ciążyński
- Marek Kruś
- Stanisław Kasprzyk
- Jerzy Czajka
- Bolesław Czaiński
- Stefan Wegnerski

== Spain ==
The following players represented Spain:

- Luis Carrera
- Antonio Nogués
- Francisco Segura
- Juan Amat
- Francisco Fábregas
- José Alustiza
- Jaime Arbós
- Jorge Fábregas
- Francisco Amat
- José Sallés
- Ramón Quintana
- Jorge Camiña
- Agustín Churruca
- Juan Arbós
- Juan Quintana
- Luis Antonio Twose
- José Borrell
- Jaime Amat

== Uganda ==
The following players represented Uganda:

- Elly Kitamireke
- Joseph Kagimu
- Ajaip Singh Matharu
- George Moraes
- Herbert Kajumba
- Willie Lobo
- Jagdish Singh Kapoor
- Upkar Singh Kapoor
- Rajinder Singh Sandhu
- Kuldip Singh Bhogal
- Ajit Singh Bhogal
- Malkit Singh Sondh
- Amarjit Singh Sandhu
- Avtar Singh Bhurji
- Polycarp Pereira
- Isaac Chirwa
- Paul Adiga

== West Germany ==
The following players represented West Germany:

- Wolfgang Rott
- Peter Kraus
- Michael Peter
- Dieter Freise
- Fritz Schmidt
- Michael Krause
- Horst Dröse
- Werner Kaessmann
- Uli Vos
- Carsten Keller
- Peter Trump
- Wolfgang Baumgart
- Wolfgang Strödter
- Eduard Thelen
- Rainer Seifert
- Detlev Kittstein
- Eckardt Suhl
- Ulrich Klaes
