= Uganda at the 1972 Summer Olympics =

- IOC code: UGA
- NOC: Uganda Olympic Committee

in Munich, West Germany
- Competitors: 33 (31 men and 2 women) in 3 sports
- Flag bearer: John Akii-Bua
- Medals Ranked 24th: Gold 1 Silver 1 Bronze 0 Total 2

Summer Olympics appearances (overview)
- 1956; 1960; 1964; 1968; 1972; 1976; 1980; 1984; 1988; 1992; 1996; 2000; 2004; 2008; 2012; 2016; 2020; 2024

Uganda competed at the 1972 Summer Olympics in Munich, West Germany which were held from 26 August to 11 September 1972. The nation's delegation consisted of 33 athletes: seventeen field hockey players, eight boxers and eight track and field athletes

John Akii-Bua's gold medal in the men's 400m hurdles was the first gold won by a Ugandan athlete at an Olympic Games. He also set a new world record in the final of the event. Boxer Leo Rwabwogo won a silver medal in the men's flyweight division, becoming the only Ugandan athlete to have won more than one Olympic medal.

Judith Ayaa set a new African record in the women's 400m while 16-year-old Rose Musani became the youngest Ugandan athlete ever to have competed at an Olympic Games, a record which stood until 1980. 41-year-old Elly Kitamireke of the field hockey team that competed at the event remains the oldest Ugandan athlete to have competed at an Olympic Games.

== Background ==
Uganda first took part in an Olympic Games at the 1956 Summer Olympics in Melbourne, Australia, although the nation was still a British protectorate at the time. The Uganda Olympic Committee had been officially recognised by the International Olympic Committee in January of the same year. The nation became fully independent in October 1962, competing under its own flag for the first time at the 1964 Summer Olympics. The 1972 Summer Olympics were held between 26 August to 11 September in Munich, West Germany with the Games being based at the Olympiapark. A total of 7,134 athletes competed in 195 events.

The 1972 Games were the fifth edition that Uganda had entered. The nation sent a delegation of 33 athletes, consisting of 31 men and two women. The majority of the delegation consisted of the nation's field hockey team of 17 players. The delegation contained five athletes who had competed at the 1968 Summer Olympics in Mexico City. Sprinter William Dralu had been eliminated in the heats of the men's 200m event. Boxer Matthias Ouma had been eliminated in his first fight, while Mohamed Muruli and David Jackson had both been defeated in the quarter-finals. The remaining boxer, Leo Rwabwogo, progressed to the semi-finals before suffering defeat to Polish fighter Artur Olech. In doing so, he won a bronze medal, one of two medals won by Uganda at the 1968 Games and the first Olympic medals the nation had ever won. The other medal was a silver won by fellow boxer Eridadi Mukwanga who did not return for the 1972 Games.

Ugandan leader Idi Amin was one of several African leaders that threatened to withdraw his nation's athletes from the competition if Rhodesia was allowed to compete. Four days before the Games were due to begin, the International Olympic Committee (IOC) expelled Rhodesia from the Games due to mounting political pressure.

== Medalists ==
=== Gold ===
- John Akii-Bua — Athletics, men's 400 metres hurdles

=== Silver ===
- Leo Rwabwogo — Boxing, men's flyweight

== Athletics ==
Uganda increased its participation in track and field events for the 1972 Games, entering eight athletes compared to three at the 1968 Games. This included two female athletes, the first the nation had entered since the 1964 Summer Olympics in Tokyo.

Sprinter William Dralu entered the 100m and 200m events. He was eliminated in the heats of both events after recording times of 10.92 and 21.87. Fulgence Rwabu took part in the marathon, placing 59th out of 62 runners who finished the race. Two other track and field athletes, Silver Ayoo and Vitus Ashaba were both eliminated in the heats of their respective events. Ayoo placed seventh in his heat for the 400m while Ashaba placed eighth and tenth in his heats for the 1500m and 3000m steeplechase. Triple jumper Abraham Munabi failed to progress past the qualifying round of his event, placing 22nd.

The remaining male athlete, John Akii-Bua entered the 400m hurdles. He had previously failed to qualify for the 1968 Games in the shorter distance hurdles. He finished his heat in first place before repeating the feat in his semi-final, beating his time in his heat by more than a second. In the final of the event, Akii-Bua was drawn in lane one, generally considered the most difficult draw. He went on to win the race and set a new world record time for the event of 47.82 seconds, the first runner in history in the 400m hurdles to record a time under 48 seconds. His victory also made him the first Ugandan athlete to win an Olympic gold medal and the first African athlete to win a gold medal in an event shorter than 800m.

The two female athletes, Judith Ayaa and Rose Musani, competed in the 400m and 200m respectively. Musani was the youngest athlete in the Ugandan delegation, aged 16 years and 28 days at the Games. She was the youngest athlete ever to compete for Uganda at an Olympic Games until boxer Charles Lubulwa entered the 1980 Summer Olympics aged 15 years and 206 days. Musani qualified from her heat in fifth place with a time of 25.37 seconds. In the quarter-finals, she recorded a marginally better time but was eliminated after finishing eighth. Ayaa also qualified from her heat in the 400m, finishing fourth. She surpassed Musani by qualifying from the quarter-final, setting a new African record of 52.68 seconds after finishing third. She was eliminated in the semi-finals, finishing seventh in her race.

Men
Track & road events

Athlete	Event	Heat		Quarterfinal		Semifinal		Final	
Athlete	Event	Result	Rank	Result	Rank	Result	Rank	Result	Rank
William Dralu	100 m	10.92	7	did not advance					
William Dralu	200 m	21.87	6	did not advance					
John Akii-Bua	400 m hurdles	50.35	1 Q	—N/a		49.25	1 Q	47.82 WR	Gold medal
Fulgence Rwabu	Marathon	—N/a						2:57:04	59
Vitus Ashaba	1500 m	3:45.2	8	did not advance					
Vitus Ashaba	3000 m steeplechase	8:45.0	10	did not advance					
Silver Ayoo	400 m	47.04	7	did not advance					

Field events

Athlete	Event	Qualification		Final	
Athlete	Event	Distance	Position	Distance	Position
Abraham Munabi	Triple jump	15.82	22	did not advance	

Women
Track events

Athlete	Event	Heat		Quarterfinal		Semifinal		Final	
Athlete	Event	Result	Rank	Result	Rank	Result	Rank	Result	Rank
Judith Ayaa	400 m	52.85	4 Q	52.68	3 Q	52.91	7	did not advance	
Rose Musani	200 m	25.37	5 Q	25.28	8	did not advance			

== Boxing ==
Uganda sent eight boxers to compete in the Games. Light-welterweight Mohamed Muruli was eliminated in the first round by Romanian Calistrat Cuțov. Four of the squad were defeated in their first fights, Matthias Ouma, John Opio, Deogratias Musoke and Peter Odhiambo. The latter three had all entered in the second round via byes due to an uneven number of fighters in their pools. Welterweight David Jackson reached the third round of his division before being eliminated by American Jesse Valdez.

Light-flyweight James Odwori started his competition by stopping two opponents in consecutive fights. However, his tournament was ended when he was stopped by eventual silver medallist, North Korean Kim U-gil. The final Ugandan boxer, Leo Rwabwogo, defeated Uruguayan Jorge Acuña in the first round of the flyweight division. He stopped British fighter Maurice O'Sullivan in the second round before recording a points victory over Thai Chawalit On-Chim. Rwabwogo guaranteed himself at least another bronze by stopping Irish fighter Neil McLaughlin in the quarter-finals, setting up a semi-final bout with Cuban Douglas Rodríguez. Rwabwogo defeated Rodriguez 3–2 on points, to surpass his bronze medal finish at the 1968 Games. In the final, he fought Bulgarian Georgi Kostadinov who dominated the first two rounds. Despite Rwabwogo mounting a "heavy" counter-offensive during the third round, Kostadinov held out to win the gold, with Rwabwogo claiming silver.

Rwabwogo's medal makes him the only Ugandan athlete to have won more than one Olympic medal in the nation's history. He is also only one of three fighters to have won more than one medal at flyweight in Olympic history, alongside Artur Olech of Poland and Bulat Zhumadilov of Kazakhstan. His silver medal victory tied him with Mukwanga for Uganda's highest placed finish at an Olympic boxing event.

Men

Athlete	Event	1 Round	2 Round	3 Round	Quarterfinals	Semifinals	Final	
Athlete	Event	Opposition Result	Opposition Result	Opposition Result	Opposition Result	Opposition Result	Rank	
James Odwori	Light Flyweight	Vicente Arsenal (PHI); W RSC-2	Said Ahmed El-Ashry (EGY); W RSC-2	—N/a	Kim U-Gil (PRK); L KO-2	did not advance		
Leo Rwabwogo	Flyweight	Jorge Acuña (URU); W TKO–3	Maurice O'Sullivan (GBR); W TKO-1	Orn-Chim Chawalit (THA); W 4–1	Neil McLaughlin (IRL); W TKO-3	Douglas Rodríguez (CUB); W 3–2	Georgi Kostadinov (BUL); L 0–5	Silver medal
Deogratias Musoke	Featherweight	BYE	Jouko Lindberg (FIN); L 0–5	did not advance				
Peter Odhiambo	Lightweight	BYE	Alfonso Pérez (COL); L 0–5	did not advance				
Mohamed Muruli	Light Welterweight	Calistrat Cuțov (ROU); L 1–4	did not advance					
David Jackson	Welterweight	Victor Zilberman (ROU); W 3–2	Vladimir Kolev (BUL); W 4–1	Jesse Valdez (USA); L 1–4	did not advance			
John Opio	Light Middleweight	BYE	Nayden Stanchev (BUL); L 2–3	did not advance				
Matthias Ouma	Middleweight	Imre Tóth (HUN); L 2–3	did not advance					

== Field hockey ==
Uganda entered a team in the field hockey event for the first time at the 1972 Games. The 17-man squad included Elly Kitamireke who was the oldest member of the Ugandan delegation. Aged 41 years and 16 days at the Games, Kitamireke remains the oldest Ugandan athlete to have ever competed at an Olympic Games. The squad was relatively unknown and started the tournament with three straight defeats before holding Argentina to a goalless draw. In the following game, Uganda played West Germany and caused an upset by holding the eventual gold medal winners to a 1–1 draw. A defeat to Belgium and a draw with Spain meant the side finished bottom of its group. The team did win its final match, a classification match against the side which finished bottom of the other group, Mexico.

Men

=== Group A ===
Team	Pld	W	D	L	GF	GA	Pts
West Germany	7	6	1	0	17	5	13
Pakistan	7	5	1	1	17	6	11
Malaysia	7	4	1	2	9	7	9
Spain	7	2	4	1	9	8	8
Belgium	7	2	1	4	8	14	5
France	7	2	0	5	6	13	4
Argentina	7	0	3	4	4	9	3
Uganda	7	0	3	4	6	14	3

27 August

Malaysia	3–1	Uganda

28 August

France	3–1	Uganda

29 August

Pakistan	3–1	Uganda

31 August

Argentina	0–0	Uganda

1 September

West Germany	1–1	Uganda

3 September

Belgium	2–0	Uganda

4 September

Spain	2–2	Uganda

=== Classification match ===
- 15th/16th place

7 September

Uganda	4–1 (1–1)	Mexico

=== Team roster ===
The roster for the Uganda field hockey side at the Games was:

- Ajaip Singh Matharu
- Ajit Singh
- Amarjits Sandhu
- Avtar Singh
- Elly Kitamireke
- George Moraes
- Herbert Kajumba
- Isaac Chirwa
- Jagdish Singh Kapoor

- Joseph Kagimu
- Kuldip Singh
- Malkit Singh
- Paul Adiga
- Polycarp Pereira
- Rajinder Sandhu
- Upkar Singh Kapoor
- Willie Lobo

== See also ==
- Uganda at the 1972 Summer Paralympics
