= Kenya at the 1972 Summer Olympics =

- IOC code: KEN
- NOC: National Olympic Committee of Kenya
- Website: teamkenya.or.ke

in Munich
- Competitors: 57 (55 men, 2 women) in 4 sports
- Flag bearer: Kip Keino
- Medals Ranked 19th: Gold 2 Silver 3 Bronze 4 Total 9

Summer Olympics appearances (overview)
- 1956; 1960; 1964; 1968; 1972; 1976–1980; 1984; 1988; 1992; 1996; 2000; 2004; 2008; 2012; 2016; 2020; 2024

Kenya competed at the 1972 Summer Olympics in Munich, West Germany. 57 competitors, 55 men and 2 women, took part in 29 events in 4 sports.

== Medalists ==
=== Gold ===
- Kipchoge Keino – Athletics, Men's 3000 metres steeplechase
- Julius Sang, Charles Asati, Munyoro Nyamau, and Robert Ouko – Athletics, Men's 4×400 metre relay

=== Silver ===
- Ben Jipcho – Athletics, Men's 3000 metre steeplechase
- Kipchoge Keino – Athletics, Men's 1500 metres
- Philip Waruinge – Boxing, Men's Featherweight

=== Bronze ===
- Julius Sang – Athletics, Men's 400 metres
- Mike Boit – Athletics, Men's 800 metres
- Samuel Mbugua – Boxing, Men's Lightweight
- Richard Murunga – Boxing, Men's Welterweight

== Athletics ==
Men's 100 metres

- John Mwebi

- First Heat – 10.60s (→ did not advance)

- Dan Amuke

- First Heat – 10.76s (→ did not advance)

Men's 800 metres

- Mike Boit

- Heat – 1:47.3
- Semifinals – 1:45.9
- Final – 1:46.0 (→ Bronze Medal)

- Robert Ouko

- Heat – 1:47.4
- Semifinals – 1:47.6
- Final – 1:46.5 (→ 5th place)

- Thomas Saisi

- Heat – 1:48.5 (→ did not advance)

Men's 1500 metres

- Kipchoge Keino

- Heat – 3:40.0
- Semifinals – 3:41.2
- Final – 3:36.8 (→ Silver Medal)

- Mike Boit

- Heat – 3:42.2
- Semifinals – 3:41.3
- Final – 3:38.4 (→ 4th place)

- Cosmas Silei

- Heat – 3:52.0 (→ did not advance)

Men's 5000 metres

- Evans Mogaka

- Heat – 13:37.2 (→ did not advance)

- Paul Mose

- Heat – 13:41.4 (→ did not advance)

- Benjamin Jipcho

- Heat – 13:56.8 (→ did not advance)

== Boxing ==
Men's Flyweight (– 51 kg)

- Felix Maina

- First Round – Bye
- Second Round – Lost to Franco Udella (ITA), 0:5

Men's Welterweight (– 67 kg)

- Richard Murungu → Bronze Medal

- First Round – Bye
- Second Round – Defeated Alfons Stawski (POL), 4:1
- Third Round – Defeated Vartex Parsanian (IRN), TKO-3
- Quarterfinals – Defeated Sergio Lozano (MEX), KO-1
- Semifinals – Lost to János Kajdi (HUN), 1:4

Men's Light Middleweight (– 71 kg)

- David Attan

- First Round – Bye
- Second Round – Lost to Mikko Saarinen (FIN), TKO-2

== Hockey ==
=== Men's team competition ===
- Preliminary Round (Group B)

- Lost to Poland (0-1)
- Lost to Australia (1-3)
- Lost to Netherlands (1-5)
- Lost to Great Britain (0-2)
- Lost to India (2-3)
- Drew with New Zealand (2-2)
- Defeated Mexico (2-1)

- Classification Match

- 13th/14th place: Defeated Argentina (1-0) after extra time → 13th place

- Team Roster

- Resham Bains
- Tarlochan Channa
- Brajinder Daved
- Davinder Deegan
- Phillip Desouza
- Leo Fernandes
- Jagjit Kular
- Ajmal Malik
- Amarjeet Marwa
- Harvinder Marwa
- Surjeet Panesar
- Pereira Reynolds
- Surjit Rihal
- Ranjit Sehmi
- Harvinderpal Sibia
- Avtar Sohal

== Shooting ==
Nine male shooters represented Kenya in 1972.

25 m pistol

- Leonard Bull
- Peter Laurence

50 m pistol

- John Harun
- Abdul Rahman Omar

300 m rifle, three positions

- Dismus Onyiego
- John Muhato

50 m rifle, prone

- Dismus Onyiego
- Simon Ekeno

Trap

- Michael Carr-Hartley
- Brian Carr-Hartley
