= 1971 Men's Hockey World Cup =

Field hockey competition held in Barcelona, Spain

1971 Hockey World Cup
Copa Mundial de Hockey Masculino de 1971 (Spanish)

Tournament details
- Host country: Spain
- City: Barcelona
- Dates: 15–24 October 1971
- Teams: 10 (from 5 confederations)
- Venue: Real Club de Polo

Final positions
- Champions: Pakistan (1st title)
- Runner-up: Spain
- Third place: India

Tournament statistics
- Matches played: 30
- Goals scored: 67 (2.23 per match)
- Top scorer: (Pakistan) Tanvir Dar (8 goals)
- Best player: (Japan) Satokazu Otsuka

The 1971 Men's Hockey World Cup was the inaugural edition of the Hockey World Cup. It took place from 15 to 24 October in Barcelona, Spain. Pakistan were the inaugural World Cup winners, beating Spain in the final, 1–0.

== Participants ==
The first World Cup was the only one without qualification. It was an invitational tournament where the top ten teams from five continents were invited by the International Hockey Federation by merit of their performances in the Summer Olympics. The teams were divided into two groups for five each, with the top two proceeding to the semi-finals after the round-robin stage. Gold medalists at the 1968 Olympics, Pakistan, were grouped in 'B' alongside runners-up Australia, and Spain, the Netherlands and Japan. Group 'A' included Argentina, France, India, Kenya and West Germany.

== Results ==
=== Preliminary round ===
==== Pool A ====
Pos	Team	Pld	W	D	L	GF	GA	GD	Pts	Qualification
1	India	4	4	0	0	5	0	+5	8	Semi-finals
2	Kenya	5	3	0	2	7	4	+3	6	Semi-finals
3	West Germany	5	2	0	3	10	7	+3	4	
4	France	4	2	0	2	2	5	−3	4	
5	Argentina	4	0	0	4	1	9	−8	0	

Source: FIH
Rules for classification: 1) points; 2) head-to-head result; 3) play-off match.

15 October 1971
15:00

West Germany	5–1	Argentina
Vos (2 goals); Baumgart (1 goal); Maier (1 goal); Kaessmann (1 goal)	Report	Ivorra (1 goal)

15 October 1971
17:00

India	1–0	France
H. Singh 42'	Report

16 October 1971
13:00

Argentina	0–1	India
	Report	R. Singh (1 goal)

16 October 1971
15:00

France	1–0	Kenya
Grain (1 goal)	Report

17 October 1971
11:00

France	0–4	West Germany
	Report	Baumgart (2 goals); Maier (2 goals)

17 October 1971
13:00

Kenya	0–2	India
	Report	K. Singh 63'; Kumar 70'

18 October 1971
13:00

Argentina	0–1	France
	Report	Langlois (1 goal)

18 October 1971
17:00

West Germany	0–3	Kenya
	Report	Avtar (1 goal); Davinder (1 goal); Jagjeet (1 goal)

19 October 1971
11:00

India	1–0	West Germany
K. Singh (1 goal)	Report

19 October 1971
17:00

Kenya	2–0	Argentina
Pal 20'; Chana 63'	Report

- The following match was contested to determine second and third place in the pool.

20 October 1971
15:00

West Germany	1–2	Kenya
Peter 44'	Report	Avtar 59', 64'

Attendance: 2,000

==== Pool B ====
Pos	Team	Pld	W	D	L	GF	GA	GD	Pts	Qualification
1	Spain (H)	4	2	1	1	5	3	+2	5	Semi-finals
2	Pakistan	4	2	1	1	11	8	+3	5	Semi-finals
3	Netherlands	4	1	2	1	4	4	0	4	
4	Australia	4	1	1	2	4	7	−3	3	
5	Japan	4	1	1	2	2	4	−2	3	

Source: FIH
Rules for classification: 1) points; 2) head-to-head result; 3) play-off match.
(H) Hosts

15 October 1971
11:00

Spain	2–0	Japan
Amat (2 goals)	Report

15 October 1971
13:00

Pakistan	5–2	Australia
Dar 1', 8', ?'; Malik (1 goal); Rashid (1 goal)	Report	Parry (1 goal); Smart ?'

16 October 1971
11:00

Netherlands	0–0	Spain
	Report

16 October 1971
17:00

Japan	0–1	Pakistan
	Report	Dar 10'

17 October 1971
15:00

Pakistan	3–3	Netherlands
Dar 3', 15', ?'	Report	N. Spits 1', 23'; Litjens 56'

17 October 1971
17:00

Australia	1–1	Japan
Parry ?'	Report	Wada 66'

18 October 1971
11:00

Netherlands	1–0	Australia
Litjens 30'	Report

18 October 1971
15:00

Spain	3–2	Pakistan
Amat ?', 69'; Salles (1 goal)	Report	Dar (1 goal); Rashid (1 goal)

Umpires:
Harry Selman (ENG)

19 October 1971
13:00

Australia	1–0	Spain
Smart 55'	Report

19 October 1971
15:00

Japan	1–0	Netherlands
Ichinose 63'	Report

=== Classification round ===
==== Ninth and tenth place ====
23 October 1971
15:30

Argentina	0–2	Japan
	Report	Chiba (1 goal); Ichinose (1 goal)

==== Fifth to eighth place classification ====
Crossover
21 October 1971
West Germany	1
Australia	0
21 October 1971
Netherlands	2
France	1

Fifth Place
23 October 1971
West Germany (a.e.t)	1
Netherlands	0
Seventh Place
23 October 1971
Australia	0
France	1

===== Crossover =====
21 October 1971
12:30

Netherlands	2–1	France
Weemers 39'; F. Spits 46'	Report	Langlois 58'

21 October 1971
15:00

West Germany	1–0	Australia
Vos	Report

===== Seventh and eighth place =====
23 October 1971
10:30

Australia	0–1	France
	Report	Grain (1 goal)

===== Fifth and sixth place =====
23 October 1971
13:00

West Germany	1–0 (a.e.t.)	Netherlands
Michel (1 goal)	Report

==== First to fourth place classification ====
Crossover: Cup Semi-Final
22 October 1971
India	1
Pakistan	2
22 October 1971
Spain (a.e.t)	1
Kenya	0

1971 World Cup Final
24 October 1971
Pakistan	1
Spain	0
Bronze Medal
24 October 1971
India (a.e.t)	2
Kenya	1

===== Semi-finals =====
22 October 1971
12:30

Spain	1–0 (a.e.t.)	Kenya
J. Fábregas 75'	Report

Can Sala Ground
Attendance: 2,000

22 October 1971
15:00

India	1–2	Pakistan
R. Singh 31'	Report	Rashid 39'; Zaman 57'

===== Third and fourth place =====
24 October 1971
12:30

India	2–1 (a.e.t.)	Kenya
R. Singh; Ganesh 89'	Report	Sohal

===== Final =====
24 October 1971
15:00

Pakistan	1–0	Spain
Islam 26'	Report

Real Club de Polo
Attendance: 10,000
Umpires:
Schittechatte (BEL)

== Final squads ==
Pakistan
Muhammad Aslam, Akhtar ul Islam, Munawwar uz Zaman, Jahangir Butt, Riaz Ahmed, Fazal ur Rehman, Khalid Mahmood, Ashfaq Ahmed, Abdul Rashid, Islahuddin Siddiquee, Shahnaz Sheikh, Muhammad Asad Malik

Spain
Luis Twose, Antoni Nogués (sub Jamie Amat), Francisco Segura, Juan Amat, Francisco Fábregas Bosch, Jorge Fábregas, Vicente Llorach, Juan Quintana, Francisco Amat, José Sallés, Agustín Masaña

== Statistics ==
=== Final standings ===
As per statistical convention in field hockey, matches decided in extra time are counted as wins and losses, while matches decided by penalty shoot-outs are counted as draws.

Pos	Grp	Team	Pld	W	D	L	GF	GA	GD	Pts	Final result
1st place, gold medalist(s)	B	Pakistan	6	4	1	1	14	9	+5	9	Gold Medal
2nd place, silver medalist(s)	B	Spain (H)	6	3	1	2	6	4	+2	7	Silver Medal
3rd place, bronze medalist(s)	A	India	6	5	0	1	8	3	+5	10	Bronze Medal
4	A	Kenya	7	3	0	4	8	7	+1	6	Fourth place
5	A	West Germany	7	4	0	3	12	7	+5	8	Eliminated in group stage
6	B	Netherlands	6	2	2	2	6	6	0	6	Eliminated in group stage
7	A	France	6	3	0	3	4	7	−3	6	Eliminated in group stage
8	B	Australia	6	1	1	4	4	9	−5	3	Eliminated in group stage
9	B	Japan	5	2	1	2	4	4	0	5	Eliminated in group stage
10	A	Argentina	5	0	0	5	1	11	−10	0	Eliminated in group stage

Source: FIH
(H) Hosts

=== Goalscorers ===
There were 67 goals scored in 30 matches, for an average of 2.23 goals per match.

8 goals

- (Pakistan) Tanvir Dar

4 goals

- (Kenya) Avtar Singh Sohal
- (Spain) Juan Amat

3 goals

- (Pakistan) Abdul Rashid
- (West Germany) Wolfgang Baumgart
- (West Germany) Winifred Maier
- (West Germany) Uli Vos
- (India) Rajwinder Singh

2 goals

- (Australia) Richard Parry
- (Australia) Donald Smart
- (France) Georges Grain
- (India) Kulwant Singh
- (Japan) Toshiaki Ichinose
- (Netherlands) Paul Litjens
- (Netherlands) Nico Spits

1 goal

- (Argentina) Jorge Ivorra
- (France) Francis Coutou
- (France) Yves Langlois
- (India) Ganesh
- (India) Vinod Kumar
- (India) Harmik Singh
- (Japan) Susumu Chiba
- (Japan) Akihito Wada
- (Kenya) Tarlochan Singh Chana
- (Kenya) Davinder Singh Deegan
- (Kenya) Jagjeet Singh Kular
- (Kenya) Ravinder Pal Singh
- (Netherlands) Irving van Nes
- (Netherlands) Frans Spits
- (Pakistan) Akhtarul Islam
- (Pakistan) Muhammad Asad Malik
- (Pakistan) Munawwaruz Zaman
- (Spain) Jorge Fábregas
- (Spain) José Salles Salva
- (West Germany) Werner Kaessmann
- (West Germany) Dirk Michel
- (West Germany) Michael Peter

=== World Eleven ===
The journalists covering the competition selected a 'world eleven' on 25 October 1971. Japan goalkeeper Satokazu Otsuka was named as player of the tournament.

- (Japan) Satokazu Otsuka
- (Netherlands) Nico Spits
- (India) Michael Kindo
- (Spain) Francisco Segura
- (India) Ajit Pal Singh
- (Spain) Jorge Fábregas
- (Pakistan) Fazalur Rehman
- (West Germany) Wolfgang Baumgart
- (India) Ashok Kumar
- (Pakistan) Muhammad Asad Malik
- (Pakistan) Shahnaz Sheikh
