= 1973 Men's Hockey World Cup =

Field hockey tournament

1973 Hockey World Cup
Wereldkampioenschap hockey mannen 1973 (Dutch)

Tournament details
- Host country: Netherlands
- City: Amstelveen
- Dates: 24 August – 2 September 1973
- Teams: 12 (from 5 confederations)
- Venue: Wagener Stadium

Final positions
- Champions: Netherlands (1st title)
- Runner-up: India
- Third place: West Germany

Tournament statistics
- Matches played: 42
- Goals scored: 124 (2.95 per match)
- Top scorer: (Netherlands) Ties Kruize (11 goals)
- Best player: (India) Surjit Singh

The 1973 Men's Hockey World Cup was the second installment of the Hockey World Cup. It was held from 24 August to 2 September at the Wagener Stadium in Amstelveen, Netherlands. The host nation, the Netherlands, became champions, defeating India 4–2 on penalty strokes after the final had finished 2–2. It was the first World Cup to introduce the 12 teams format which became the standard format of the FIH Hockey World Cup until the 1998 edition.

== Teams ==
Dates	Event	Location	Quotas	Qualifiers
27 August – 10 September 1972	1972 Summer Olympics	Munich, West Germany	7	West Germany; Netherlands; England; Pakistan; India; ~~Australia~~ (Note: Australia withdrew because of a lack of funds, they were replaced by New Zealand.); Kenya; Argentina
18 March 1973	Appointed by the FIH	Brussels, Belgium	5	Spain; Malaysia; Belgium; Japan; New Zealand
Total			12	

The top eight teams from last year's Summer Olympics in Munich qualified automatically: England qualified in place of Great Britain from the Olympics spot as most of the players from that squad were from England, and England had a better record among the Home Nations.

Australia, despite qualifying through the Olympics, withdrew because of lack of funds. Originally, four teams were to be invited for the World Cup, but after the withdrawal of Australia this was increased to five. Spain, Malaysia, Belgium and Japan were all invited by the FIH for the event, while New Zealand was invited to replace Australia.

Other nations who showed interest in competing were Canada, France, Gibraltar, Ireland, Italy, Mexico, Nigeria, Poland, Ireland, Scotland, Wales, Rhodesia, South Africa, and the Soviet Union.

== Group stage ==
=== Pool A ===
Pos	Team	Pld	W	D	L	GF	GA	GD	Pts	Qualification
1	West Germany	5	4	1	0	6	2	+4	9	Semifinals
2	India	5	3	2	0	12	1	+11	8	Semifinals
3	Spain	5	3	0	2	9	5	+4	6	
4	New Zealand	5	1	2	2	13	8	+5	4	
5	Kenya	5	0	2	3	6	14	−8	2	
6	Japan	5	0	1	4	3	19	−16	1	

Source: FIH

24 August 1973

West Germany	2–1	New Zealand
Krause; Vos	Report	Dayman

24 August 1973

Spain	4–1	Kenya
Amat; Masaña	Report	Brajinder

24 August 1973

India	5–0	Japan
Chand; Govinda; Harcharan; Surjit	Report

25 August 1973

West Germany	0–0	India
	Report

25 August 1973

Kenya	2–2	Japan
Tarlochan	Report	Konakayama; Hirano

25 August 1973

New Zealand	1–2	Spain
Dayman	Report	Borrell; Amat

26 August 1973

Japan	1–8	New Zealand
Ichinose	Report	Archibald; Christensen; Dayman; B. Maister; S. Maister; McIntyre; Patel

26 August 1973

Spain	0–1	West Germany
	Report	Strodter

26 August 1973

India	4–0	Kenya
Ajitpal; Baldev; Chand; Govinda	Report

28 August 1973

India	1–1	New Zealand
Baldev	Report	B. Maister 55'

28 August 1973

Kenya	1–2	West Germany
Jagmel	Report	Krause

28 August 1973

Japan	0–3	Spain
	Report	Masaña; Amat; Segura

29 August 1973

New Zealand	2–2	Kenya
Archibald; Parkin	Report	Jagjeet

29 August 1973

Spain	0–2	India
	Report	Surjit

29 August 1973

West Germany	1–0	Japan
Seifert	Report

=== Pool B ===
Pos	Team	Pld	W	D	L	GF	GA	GD	Pts	Qualification
1	Pakistan	5	4	1	0	16	5	+11	9	Semifinals
2	Netherlands (H)	5	3	1	1	11	4	+7	7	Semifinals
3	England	5	1	2	2	9	8	+1	4	
4	Belgium	5	2	0	3	8	12	−4	4	
5	Malaysia	5	1	1	3	5	13	−8	3	
6	Argentina	5	0	3	2	2	9	−7	3	

Source: FIH
(H) Hosts

24 August 1973

England	5–2	Belgium
Long; Neale; Svehlik	Report	Dupont; Gilles

24 August 1973

Pakistan	4–2	Malaysia
Ahmed; Azam; Dar; Samiullah	Report	Santa Maria; Shamuganathan

24 August 1973

Netherlands	0–0	Argentina
	Report

25 August 1973

Argentina	1–2	Belgium
Sabbione	Report	Maroye; De Saedeleer

25 August 1973

Netherlands	1–2	Pakistan
Kruize	Report	Azam

25 August 1973

Malaysia	2–1	England
Mahendran; Shanmuganathan	Report	Svehlik

26 August 1973

Malaysia	1–1	Argentina
Shanmuganathan	Report	Sabbione

26 August 1973

Belgium	1–4	Netherlands
Verhulst	Report	Kruize; Litjens; Steens

26 August 1973

England	2–2	Pakistan
Neale; Whalley	Report	Ahmed; Dar

28 August 1973

Netherlands	4–0	Malaysia
Kruize; Litjens	Report

28 August 1973

Pakistan	2–0	Belgium
Dar	Report

28 August 1973

Argentina	0–0	England
	Report

29 August 1973

Pakistan	6–0	Argentina
Abbas; Ahmed; Dar; Samiullah	Report

29 August 1973

England	1–2	Netherlands
Long	Report	Kruize; Zweerts

29 August 1973

Belgium	3–0	Malaysia
Maroye; Gilles; Miserque	Report

== Classification round ==
=== Ninth to twelfth place classification ===
Crossover
31 August
Kenya	0
Argentina	2
31 August
Malaysia	0
Japan	1

Ninth place
1 September
Argentina	2
Japan	1
Eleventh place
1 September
Kenya	0
Malaysia	1

==== Crossover ====
31 August 1973

Kenya	0–2	Argentina
	Report	Lavagano; Paolucci

31 August 1973

Malaysia	0–1	Japan
	Report	Yamamoto

==== Eleventh and twelfth place ====
1 September 1973

Kenya	0–1	Malaysia
	Report	Pathmarajah

==== Ninth and tenth place ====
1 September 1973

Argentina	2–1	Japan
Lavagano; Sabbione	Report	Ichinose

=== Fifth to eighth place classification ===
Crossover
31 August
Spain	5
Belgium	0
31 August
England (a.e.t.)	1
New Zealand	0

Fifth place
2 September
Spain	3
England	0
Seventh place
1 September
Belgium	1
New Zealand	3

==== Crossover ====
31 August 1973

England	1–0 (a.e.t.)	New Zealand
Whalley	Report

31 August 1973

Spain	5–0	Belgium
F. Amat; J. Amat; Fábregas; Monegal; Segura	Report

==== Seventh and eighth place ====
1 September 1973

Belgium	1–3	New Zealand
Dupont	Report	B. Masiter; McIntyre; Patel

==== Fifth and sixth place ====
2 September 1973

Spain	3–0	England
Masaña; Segura	Report

== Medal round ==
Semi-finals
31 August
West Germany	0 (2)
Netherlands (pen.)	0 (4)
31 August
Pakistan	0
India	1

Final
2 September
Netherlands (pen.)	2 (4)
India	2 (2)
Third place
2 September
West Germany	1
Pakistan	0

=== Semi-finals ===
31 August 1973

West Germany	0–0 (a.e.t.)	Netherlands
	Report
Penalties
	2–4

31 August 1973

Pakistan	0–1	India
	Report	Govinda 62'

=== Third and fourth place ===
2 September 1973

West Germany	1–0	Pakistan
Krause 68'	Report

== Final ==
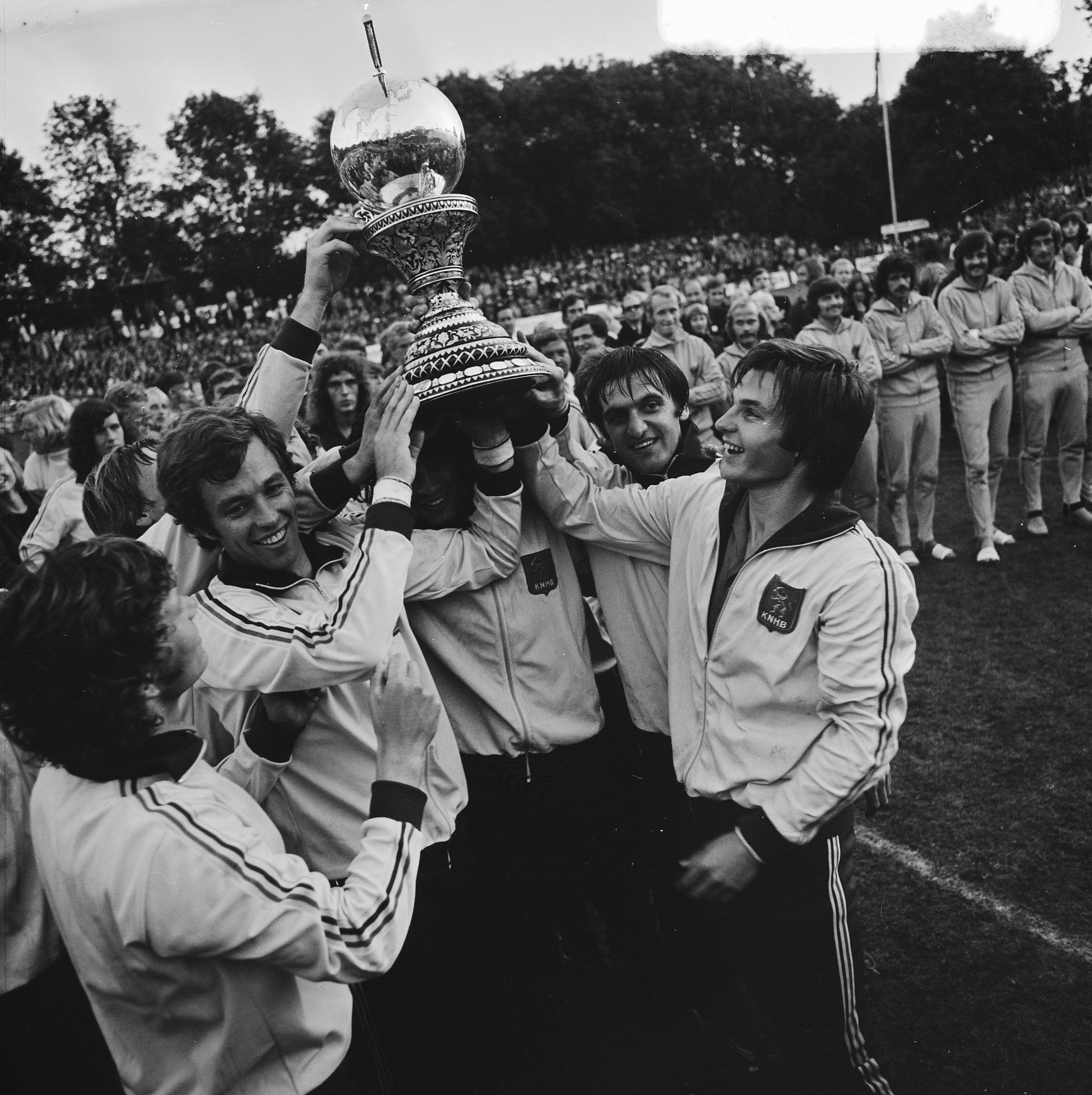
Nico Spits and Ties Kruize (right) with the World Cup

The final was held on 2 September 1973 at the Wagener Stadium, Amstelveen. The hosts Netherlands defeated India on penalty strokes after the match ended 2–2 after extra time. The win gave Netherlands their first FIH Hockey World Cup title, becoming the second team to win it and the first from Europe and the first host nation to win it.

Surjit Singh of India scored two early goals in the first eight minutes giving India a 2–0 lead. He scored another goal in the first half for his hat-trick but it was disallowed by the umpire. India went into half time with two goals lead. In the second half Netherlands played more players forward and in result Ties Kruize scored two goals to equalize the match at 2–2. In extra time, India got a penalty stroke but B. P. Govinda missed the chance in sudden death. The match was decided by penalty strokes where the Indian goalkeeper Charles Cornelius failed to stop a single penalty stroke as Netherlands won the shoot out 4–2.

2 September 1973

Netherlands	2–2 (a.e.t.)	India
Kruize	Report	Surjit
Penalties
	4–2

Wagener Stadium, Amstelveen

1973 Hockey World Cup winner

Netherlands
First title

== Final standings ==
Pos	Team	Pld	W	D	L	GF	GA	GD	Pts	Final result
1st place, gold medalist(s)	Netherlands (H)	7	3	3	1	13	6	+7	9	Gold medal
2nd place, silver medalist(s)	India	7	4	3	0	15	3	+12	11	Silver medal
3rd place, bronze medalist(s)	West Germany	7	5	2	0	7	2	+5	12	Bronze medal
4	Pakistan	7	4	1	2	16	7	+9	9	
5	Spain	7	5	0	2	17	5	+12	10	
6	England	7	2	2	3	10	11	−1	6	
7	New Zealand	7	2	2	3	16	10	+6	6	
8	Belgium	7	2	0	5	9	20	−11	4	
9	Argentina	7	2	3	2	6	10	−4	7	
10	Japan	7	1	1	5	5	21	−16	3	
11	Malaysia	7	2	1	4	7	15	−8	5	
12	Kenya	7	0	2	5	6	17	−11	2	

Source: FIH
(H) Hosts

== Goalscorers ==
There were 126 goals scored in 42 matches, for an average of 3 goals per match.

9 goals

- (Netherlands) Ties Kruize

7 goals

- (Pakistan) Tanvir Dar

6 goals

- (India) Surjit Singh Randhawa
- (Spain) Juan Amat

4 goals

- (Spain) Agustín Masaña
- (West Germany) Michael Krause

3 goals

- (Argentina) Jorge Sabbione
- (England) Stephen Long
- (England) James Neale
- (India) Billimoga P. Govinda
- (Malaysia) Sri Shanmuganathan
- (New Zealand) Jeffrey Archibald
- (New Zealand) Gregory Dayman
- (New Zealand) Barry Maister
- (Pakistan) Laeeq Ahmed
- (Pakistan) Muhammad Azam
- (Spain) Francisco Segura

2 goals

- (Argentina) Julio Lavagano
- (Belgium) Daniel Dupont
- (Belgium) Jean-François Gilles
- (Belgium) Robert Maroye
- (England) Paul Svehlik
- (England) Colin Whalley
- (India) Baldev Singh
- (India) Chand Singh
- (Japan) Toshiaki Ichinose
- (Kenya) Jagjeet Singh Kular
- (Kenya) Tarlochan Singh Chana
- (Netherlands) Paul Litjens
- (New Zealand) Alan McIntyre
- (New Zealand) Ramesh Patel
- (Pakistan) Samiullah Khan

1 goal

- (Argentina) Gustavo Paolucci
- (Belgium) Guy Miserque
- (Belgium) Michel de Saedeleer
- (Belgium) Stephan Verhulst
- (India) Ajitpal Singh
- (India) Harcharan Singh
- (Japan) Toru Hirano
- (Japan) Kanzo Konakayama
- (Japan) Takeo Yamamoto
- (Kenya) Brajinder Singh Daved
- (Kenya) Jagmel Singh Rooprai
- (Malaysia) Murugesan Mahendran
- (Malaysia) Ramalingam Pathmarajah
- (Malaysia) Brian Santa Maria
- (Netherlands) Ronaldus Steens
- (Netherlands) Jeroen Zweerts
- (New Zealand) Jonathan Christensen
- (New Zealand) Selwyn Maister
- (New Zealand) Arthur Parkin
- (Pakistan) Safdar Abbas
- (Spain) Francisco Amat
- (Spain) José Borrell
- (Spain) Jorge Fábregas
- (Spain) Jorge Monegal
- (West Germany) Rainer Seifert
- (West Germany) Wolfgang Strodter
- (West Germany) Uli Vos

Source: FIH
