= Malaysia at the 1972 Summer Olympics =

- IOC code: MAS (MAL used at these Games)
- NOC: Olympic Council of Malaysia

in Munich
- Competitors: 45 in 6 sports
- Flag bearer: Mohammed Bakar
- Medals: Gold 0 Silver 0 Bronze 0 Total 0

Summer Olympics appearances (overview)
- 1956; 1960; 1964; 1968; 1972; 1976; 1980; 1984; 1988; 1992; 1996; 2000; 2004; 2008; 2012; 2016; 2020; 2024; 2028

Other related appearances
- North Borneo (1956)

Malaysia competed at the 1972 Summer Olympics in Munich, West Germany. 45 competitors, 42 men and 3 women, took part in 20 events in 6 sports.

== Athletics ==
Key

- Note–Ranks given for track events are within the athlete's heat only
- Q = Qualified for the next round
- q = Qualified for the next round as a fastest loser or, in field events, by position without achieving the qualifying target
- NR = National record
- N/A = Round not applicable for the event
- Bye = Athlete not required to compete in round

Men
Track events

Athlete	Event	Heat		Quarterfinal		Semifinal		Final	
Athlete	Event	Result	Rank	Result	Rank	Result	Rank	Result	Rank
Zainuddin Wahab	100 m	10.80	7	Did not advance					
Zainuddin Wahab	200 m	21.87	5	Did not advance					
Tambusamy Krishnan	400 m	48.31	5	Did not advance					
Ishtiaq Mubarak	110 m hurdles	14.78	7	—N/a		Did not advance			
Baba Singhe Peyadesa; Mohamed Hassan Osman; Sinnayah Sabapathy; Tambusamy Krishnan	4 × 400 m relay	3:13.51	6	—N/a				Did not advance	

Women
Track event

Athlete	Event	Heat		Quarterfinal		Semifinal		Final	
Athlete	Event	Result	Rank	Result	Rank	Result	Rank	Result	Rank
Junaidah Aman	400 m	57.36	6	Did not advance					

Combined events – Pentathlon

Athlete	Event	100H	SP	HJ	LJ	200 m	Final	Rank
Gladys Chai	Result	18.46	6.95	1.60	–	–	DNF	–
Gladys Chai	Points	440	363	834	–	–	DNF	–

== Cycling ==
Four cyclists represented Malaysia in 1972.

=== Road ===
Athlete	Event	Time	Rank
Abdul Bahar-ud-Din Rahum	Men's individual road race	DNF	
Daud Ibrahim	Men's individual road race	DNF	
Omar Haji Saad	Men's individual road race	DNF	
Saad Fadzil	Men's individual road race	DNF	
Abdul Bahar-ud-Din Rahum; Daud Ibrahim; Omar Haji Saad; Saad Fadzil	Men's team time trial	2:46:51.6	35

=== Track ===
Sprint

Athlete	Event	Round 1	Repechage 1	Round 2	Repechage 2	1/8 finals	1/8 repechage	1/8 repechage finals	Quarterfinals	Semifinals	Final	
Athlete	Event	Opposition Time	Opposition Time	Opposition Time	Opposition Time	Opposition Time	Opposition Time	Opposition Time	Opposition Time	Opposition Time	Opposition Time	Rank
Daud Ibrahim	Men's sprint	E Cardi (ITA); F Suárez (ESP); L	K Balk (NED); M Hugh-Sam (JAM); L	Did not advance								

Time trial

Athlete	Event	Time	Rank
Daud Ibrahim	Men's 1000 m time trial	1:16.27	29

== Football ==
=== Men's tournament ===
Squad

Head coach: Jalil Che Din

No.	Pos.	Player	DoB	Age	Caps	Club	Tournament games	Tournament goals	Minutes played	Sub off	Sub on	Cards yellow/red
1	GK	Wong Kam Fook	17 March 1949	23	17	(Malaysia) Perak	3	0	207	1	0	0
2	DF	Othman Abdullah	13 March 1945	27	22	(Malaysia) Johor	3	0	270	0	0	0
3	DF	Soh Chin Aun	19 July 1948	24	39	(Malaysia) Selangor	3	0	270	0	0	0
4	DF	Namat Abdullah	12 March 1945	27	22	(Malaysia) Penang	3	0	270	0	0	0
5	DF	Mohammed Chandran	4 May 1942	30	97	(Malaysia) Selangor	3	0	270	0	0	0
6	FW	Khoo Huan Khen	27 March 1951	21	0	(Malaysia) Perak	0	0	0	0	0	0
7	MD	Hamzah Hussain	8 August 1948	23	27	(Malaysia) Kelantan	3	0	188	0	1	0
8	MD	Shahruddin Abdullah	29 September 1949	22	49	(Malaysia) Penang	3	1	248	1	0	0
9	MD	Wan Zawawi Yusoff	11 April 1949	23	11	(Malaysia) Kelantan	3	1	270	0	0	0
10	DF	V Krishnasami	13 Jan 1948	24	21	(Malaysia) Perak	0	0	0	0	0	0
11	MD	Salleh Ibrahim	1 Nov 1947	24	27	(Malaysia) Kelantan	3	1	270	0	0	0
12	FW	Harun Jusoh			16	(Malaysia) Terengganu	0	0	0	0	0	0
13	GK	Lim Fung Kee	24 Mar 1950	22	3	(Malaysia) Selangor	1	0	63	0	1	0
14	MD	Wong Choon Wah	31 March 1947	25	56	(Malaysia) Selangor	3	0	262	1	0	0
15	DF	Ali Bakar	18 Nov 1947	24	19	(Malaysia) Penang	0	0	0	0	0	0
16	MD	Mohammed Bakar	25 Jun 1945	27	12	(Malaysia) Penang	1	0	22	0	1	0
17	FW	Looi Loon Teik	15 February 1945	27	12	(Malaysia) Kedah	3	0	209	0	1	0
18	FW	Rahim Abdullah	12 Sep 1947	24	6	(Malaysia) Selangor	1	0	61	1	0	(yellow card) 1
19	MD	Bahwandi Hiralal	1 Jun 1951	21	18	(Malaysia) Selangor	1	0	90	0	0	0

Group A

Team	Pld	W	D	L	GF	GA	GD	Pts
West Germany	3	3	0	0	13	0	+13	6
Morocco	3	1	1	1	6	3	+3	3
Malaysia	3	1	0	2	3	9	−6	2
United States	3	0	1	2	0	10	−10	1

27 August 1972
12:00

West Germany	3 – 0	Malaysia
Worm 56'; Kalb 71'; Seliger 82'	Report

Olympic Stadium, Munich
Attendance: 60.000
Referee: Armando Marques (Brazil)

29 August 1972
12:00

Malaysia	3 – 0	United States
Shaharuddin 14'; Salleh 67'; Zawawi 77'	Report

Ingolstadt
Attendance: 3.000
Referee: Henry Oberg (Norway)

31 August 1972
12:00

Morocco	6 – 0	Malaysia
Benkhrif 16'; Faras 19' 21' 25'; El Filali 56'; Tati 85'	Report

Ingolstadt
Attendance: 2.500
Referee: Károly Palotai (Hungary)

Ranked 10th in final standings

== Hockey ==
=== Men's tournament ===
Team roster

- Khairuddin Zainal
- Francis Belavantheran
- Sri Shanmuganathan
- Brian Santa Maria
- Phang Poh Meng
- Wong Choon Hin
- Singaram Balasingam
- Sayed Samat
- Sulaiman Saibot
- Franco de Cruz
- Murugesan Mahendran
- Harnahal Singh Sewa
- Yang Siow Ming
- Omar Mohamed Razali Yeop
- Ramalingam Pathmarajah
- Randhir Singh

Group A

Team	Pld	W	D	L	GF	GA	Pts
West Germany	7	6	1	0	17	5	13
Pakistan	7	5	1	1	17	6	11
Malaysia	7	4	1	2	9	7	9
Spain	7	2	4	1	9	8	8
Belgium	7	2	1	4	8	14	5
France	7	2	0	5	6	13	4
Argentina	7	0	3	4	4	9	3
Uganda	7	0	3	4	6	14	3

Qualified for the semifinals

27 August 1972

Malaysia	3–1	Uganda

28 August 1972

West Germany	1–0	Malaysia

29 August 1972

Malaysia	0–0	Spain

31 August 1972

Malaysia	1–0	France

1 September 1972

Malaysia	4–2	Belgium

3 September 1972

Pakistan	3–0	Malaysia

4 September 1972

Malaysia	1–0	Argentina

Fifth to eighth place classification

7 September 1972

Australia	2–1	Malaysia

Seventh and eighth place match

9 September 1972

Spain	2–1	Malaysia

Ranked 8th in final standings

== Shooting ==
Mixed

Athlete	Event	Qualification		Final	
Athlete	Event	Points	Rank	Points	Rank
Wong Foo Wah	50 m rifle prone	—N/a		581	85

== Swimming ==
Men

Athlete	Event	Heat		Semifinal		Final	
Athlete	Event	Time	Rank	Time	Rank	Time	Rank
Chiang Jin Choon	100 m backstroke	1:07.65	7	Did not advance			
Chiang Jin Choon	200 m backstroke	2:26.51	6	—N/a		Did not advance	
Chiang Jin Choon	200 m individual medley	2:32.67	7	—N/a		Did not advance	

Women

Athlete	Event	Heat		Semifinal		Final	
Athlete	Event	Time	Rank	Time	Rank	Time	Rank
Ong Mei Lin	100 m backstroke	1:19.39	7	Did not advance			
Ong Mei Lin	200 m backstroke	2:46.40	8	—N/a		Did not advance	
Ong Mei Lin	200 m individual medley	2:48.13	8	—N/a		Did not advance	
