= Kagimu =

Kagimu is a surname. Notable people with the surname include:

- Charles Kagimu (born 1998), Ugandan cyclist
- Joseph Kagimu (born 1945), Ugandan field hockey player
- Magid Kagimu (born c. 1954), Ugandan physician
- Shafiq Kagimu (born 1998), Ugandan footballer
- Maurice Peter Kagimu Kiwanuka, Ugandan politician
