= Marwaha =

Marwaha, also spelled Marwah, is a Khatri Hindu and Sikh surname which may have originated in the Marwah valley, in the Kishtwar region of Jammu & Kashmir. It may refer to:

== Notable people ==
- Khivi (born Khivi Marwaha, 1506–1582), Punjabi saint
- Amarjeet Singh Marwa (born 1947), Kenyan field hockey player
- Asmita Marwa, Indian fashion designer
- Emil Marwa (born 1974), British actor
- Harvinder Singh Marwa (born 1943), Kenyan field hockey player
- Jaswant Singh Marwah (born 1921), Indian soldier, journalist and author
- Joginder Jaswant Singh (born 1945), Indian general and politician, son of Jaswant Singh Marwah
- Mahip Marwaha, Indian television actor
- Nikkitasha Marwaha, Indian model and beauty pageant winner
- Rohan Marwaha (born 1994), Indian cricketer
- Sabi Marwah (born 1951), Canadian politician and banker
- Shilpi Marwaha, Indian theatre artist and activist
- Suparna Marwah, Indian actress
- Surinder Marwah, Indian sport shooter
- Tarvinder Singh Marwah (born 1959), Indian politician
- Ved Marwah (1934–2020), Indian politician
- Vikram Marwah (1925–2013), Indian surgeon and social worker
- Vinita Marwaha Madill (born 1987), British Space Operations engineer and science communicator
- Vishal Marwaha (born 1976), Scottish field hockey player
