= Francisco Ramírez =

Francisco Ramírez may refer to:

- Francisco Ramírez Acuña (born 1952), Mexican politician, governor of Jalisco in 2001–2006
- Francisco Ramírez (bishop) (died 1564)
- Francisco Ramírez (field hockey) (born 1948), Mexican former field hockey player
- Francisco Ramírez (governor) (1786–1821), Argentine governor of Entre Ríos during the War of Independence
- Francisco Ramírez Ham (fl. 1910s), Chilean Liberal politician
- Francisco Ramírez (Honduran footballer) (born 1976), Honduran footballer
- Francisco Ramírez Luque (1886–1924) Mexican politician, governor of Querétaro in 1923
- Francisco Ramírez de Madrid (died 1501), Spanish soldier and courtier
- Francisco Ramírez Martínez (born 1943), Mexican politician, municipal president of Aguascalientes in 1978–1980
- Francisco Ramírez Medina (born 1828), Puerto Rican independence leader
- Francisco Ramírez Migliassi (fl. 1980s), Chilean military officer and public official
- Francisco Ramírez Villarreal Mexican politician, governor of Colima in 1917–1919
- Paco Ramírez (born 1965), Mexican football manager and former footballer
- Francisco Vargas Ramirez, Puerto Rican boxer
