= Matharu =

Matharu or Matharoo is a Jatt surname. Notable people with the surname include:

- Ajaip Singh Matharu (born 1938), Ugandan hockey player
- Inderjit Singh Matharu (born 1969), Kenyan hockey player
- Jeet Matharu, Indian film director
- Kiran Matharu (born 1989), British golfer
- Santokh Singh Matharu (1942–2011), Kenyan hockey player
