= Juszczak =

Juszczak is a surname. Notable people with the surname include:

- Joe Juszczak (Joe Just) (1916–2003), Major League Baseball catcher
- Katarzyna Juszczak (born 1972), retired amateur Polish-born Italian judoka and freestyle wrestler
- Piotr Juszczak (born 1988), Polish rower
- Włodzimierz Juszczak OSBM (born 1957), bishop ordinary of the Wrocław-Gdańsk Eparchy of the Ukrainian Greek Catholic Church
- Zbigniew Juszczak (field hockey, born 1975) (born 1975), Polish former Olympic field hockey player
- Zbigniew Juszczak (field hockey, born 1946) (born 1946), Polish field hockey player

== See also ==
- Juszczyk
