= Choroba =

Choroba may refer to:

- Choroba or Choruba, a dialect of the Gonja language
- Choroba (surname)
