= Van Lidth De Jeude =

- Erland Van Lidth De Jeude (1953–1987) was a Dutch-American actor, opera singer, and amateur wrestler
- Flip van Lidth de Jeude (born 1949), Dutch field hockey player
- Marc Liénart van Lidth de Jeude (1950–2019), known professionally as Art Sullivan, Belgian singer
- Otto van Lidth de Jeude (1881–1952), Dutch politician
- Theodoor Gerard van Lidth de Jeude (1788–1863), Dutch physician, veterinarian, and zoologist, grandfather of Theodorus
- Theodorus Willem van Lidth de Jeude (1853–1937), Dutch zoologist and herpetologist, grandson of Theodoor.
