= Zbigniew Juszczak =

Zbigniew Juszczak may refer to:

- Zbigniew Juszczak (field hockey, born 1975)
- Zbigniew Juszczak (field hockey, born 1946)
