= David Blackmore =

David Blackmore may refer to:

- David Blackmore (cricketer) (1909–1988), Welsh cricketer
- David Blackmore (field hockey) (born 1946), British hockey international
