= Manuel Noriega (disambiguation) =

Manuel Noriega (1934–2017) was the authoritarian military ruler of Panama.

Manuel Noriega may also refer to:

- Manuel Noriega (field hockey), Mexican field hockey player
- Manuel Noriega (actor), Mexican actor

== See also ==
- Noriega (surname)
