= David Blackmore (field hockey) =

British field hockey player

Personal information
- Born: Q41.1946 Prescot, England

Sport
- Sport: Field hockey
- Position: Full back
Senior career
Years	Team	Caps	Goals
1966–1968	Liverpool University	-	-
1968–1997	Liverpool Sefton Hockey Club	-	-
National team
Years	Team	Caps	Goals
–	Great Britain		-
–	England		-

David G. Blackmore (born Q1.1946) is a former British hockey international.

== Biography ==
Blackmore studied at the University of Liverpool and captained the University's hockey team. He also represented the North and Lancashire.

He played club hockey for Liverpool Sefton Hockey Club in the Men's England Hockey League.

While at Liverpool Sefton he made his debut for England against the Netherlands in March 1973 and represented England at the 1973 Men's Hockey World Cup in Amstelveen.

He was also selected by England for the 1975 Men's Hockey World Cup in Kuala Lumpur.

After he retired from international competition he continued to play for his club throughout his forties and until the age of 51.
