= Choroba (surname) =

Choroba is a surname. Notable people with the surname include:

- Jerzy Choroba (born 1949), Polish field hockey player
- Patrick Choroba (born 1996), German-Polish footballer
