= Harcharan Singh (field hockey) =

Indian field hockey player

Brigadier Harcharan Singh VSM
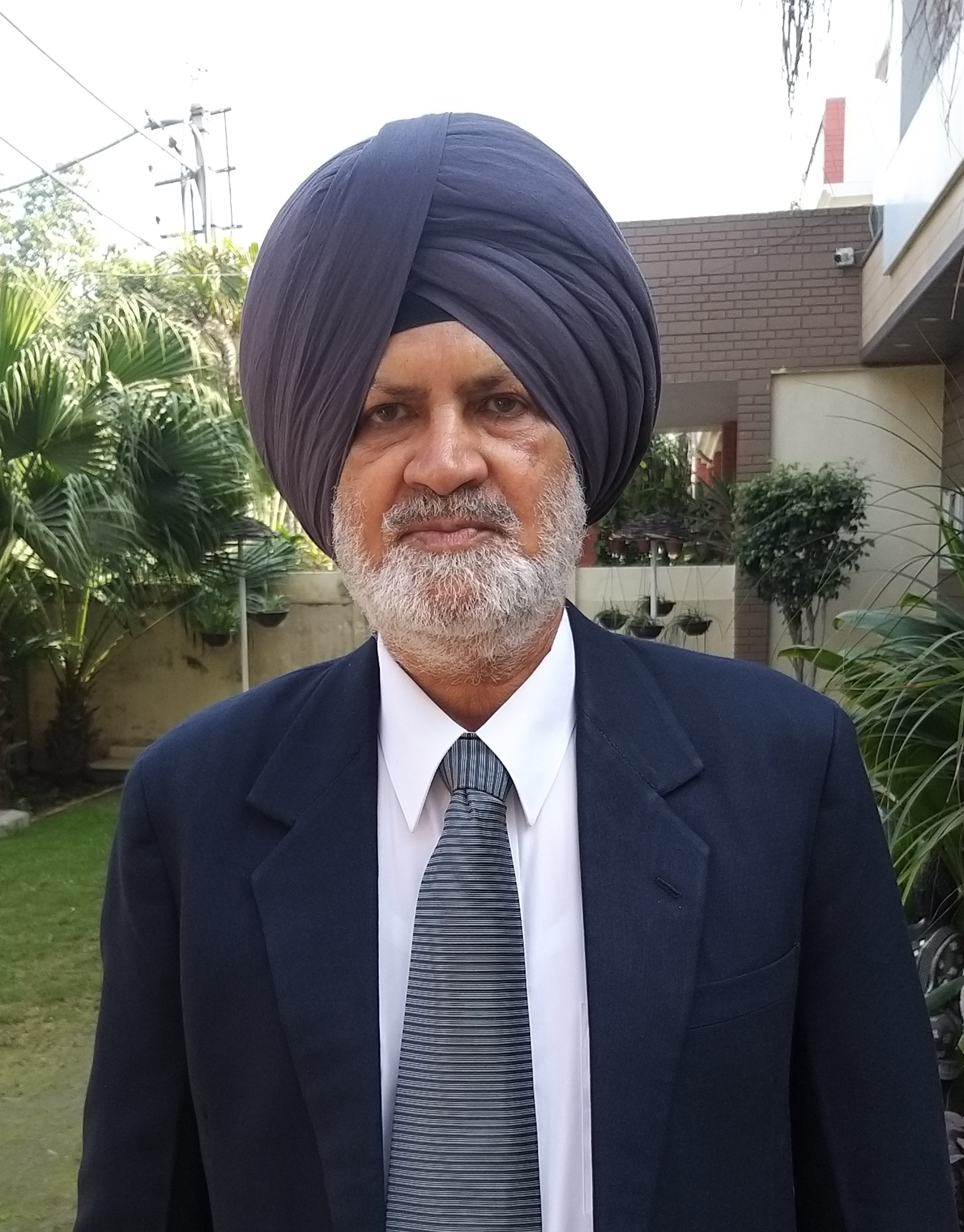
- Singh in Amritsar, February 2022

Personal details
- Born: 15 January 1950 (age 76) Marar, Gurdaspur, Punjab, India
- Spouse: Dilraj Kaur
- Children: 2
- Occupation: Former field hockey player, motivational speaker

Military service
- Allegiance: India
- Branch/service: Indian Army
- Years of service: 1969–1999
- Rank: Brigadier

Harcharan Singh
Medal record

Men's field hockey

Representing India

Olympic Games
Bronze medal – third place	1972 Munich	Team

Hockey World Cup
Bronze medal – third place	1971 Barcelona	Team
Silver medal – second place	1973 Amsterdam	Team
Gold medal – first place	1975 Kuala Lumpur	Team

Asian Games
Silver medal – second place	1970 Bangkok	Team
Silver medal – second place	1974 Tehran	Team

Brigadier Harcharan Singh VSM (born January 15, 1950) is an Indian field hockey player. He was a member of bronze medal winner India men's national field hockey team at the 1972 Summer Olympics in Munich.

== Early life, education and army ==
He was born in Marar, Gurdaspur, Punjab. He joined the Indian Army, long after he began playing hockey in 1969. Singh explains, “I joined the Army quite late. The reason being my lack of fluency in English. I studied at the Khalsa Government school in rural Punjab. To qualify to [be] an officer in the Services, one must be fluent in English. I picked up the language but struggled a lot to move up the ranks in the early stages of my career in the army."

Harcharan Singh is the uncle of the Indian cricketer Balwinder Sandhu.

== Field hockey ==
Singh was member of India men's national field hockey team which won Bronze in 1972 Summer Olympics held in Munich. Singh was also member of Indian Hockey Team which won Bronze in 1971 Barcelona Hockey World Cup, Silver in 1973 Amsterdam Hockey World Cup and Gold in 1975 Kuala Lumpur Hockey World Cup. In Asian Games Singh's team won Silver medals in 1970 Asian Games held in Bangkok and 1974 Asian Games held in Tehran. Singh also competed at the 1976 Summer Olympics.

== Awards ==
Singh was awarded Arjuna Award in 1977. He was awarded Vishisht Seva Medal for distinguished services to the nation while serving in the Army in 1981, the Maharaja Ranjit Singh Award by the Punjab Government in 2019 which acknowledged him as a Punjab sports legend and the Sri Guru Nanak Dev Ji Achiever’s Award among 400 prominent Punjabis globally, also in 2019 by Capt. Amarinder Singh on the occasion of 550th Prakash Purb celebrations of Sri Guru Nanak Dev Ji.
