= Helen Olaye =

Nigerian sprinter

Personal information
- Nationality: Nigerian
- Born: 30 August 1946 (age 79)

Sport
- Sport: Sprinting
- Event: 200 metres

Helen Olaye (born 30 August 1946) is a Nigerian sprinter. She competed in the women's 200 metres at the 1972 Summer Olympics.
