= Athletics at the 1972 Summer Olympics – Women's 200 metres =

Women's 200 metres at the Games of the XX Olympiad
- Venue: Olympic Stadium
- Dates: September 4 & 7, 1972
- Competitors: 37 from 27 nations
- Winning time: 22.40 WR

Medalists
1st place, gold medalist(s)		Renate Stecher; East Germany
2nd place, silver medalist(s)		Raelene Boyle; Australia
3rd place, bronze medalist(s)		Irena Szewińska; Poland

The women's 200 metres sprint event at the 1972 Olympic Games took place on September 4 & 7. The favorite would have been Republic of China's Chi Cheng, who set world records in the 200 meters and 220 yards distances in 1970. She suffered a career ending injury at the end of 1970. An attempted surgery in 1971 failed. The top three ranked women in the world in 1971, were the three women on the podium in Munich—European Champion Renate Stecher (GDR) who won by 0.05 seconds, Commonwealth Champion Raelene Boyle (AUS), and the defending Champion Irena Szewinska of Poland.

== Heats ==
Top five in each heat (blue) and the next two fastest (pink) advanced to quarterfinal round.

=== Heat 1 ===
Rank	Name	Nationality	Lane	Time
1	Alice Anum	Ghana	6	23.15
2	Barbara Ferrell	United States	5	23.38
3	Rosie Allwood	Jamaica	1	23.56
4	Donna Murray	Great Britain	3	23.76
5	Juana Mosquera	Colombia	2	24.20
6	Carolina Rieuwpassa	Indonesia	7	24.68
-	Irene Fitzner	Argentina	4	DNS

=== Heat 2 ===
Rank	Name	Nationality	Lane	Time
1	Renate Stecher	East Germany	2	22.96
2	Raelene Boyle	Australia	4	23.58
3	Nadezhda Besfamilnaya	Soviet Union	3	23.62
4	Amelita Alanes	Philippines	5	25.28
5	Helen Olaye	Nigeria	1	25.30
6	Mabel Saeluzika	Malawi	6	28.29
-	Carmen Valdes	Cuba	7	DNS

=== Heat 3 ===
Rank	Name	Nationality	Lane	Time
1	Annegret Kroniger	West Germany	4	23.37
2	Wilma van Gool	Netherlands	6	23.86
3	Della Pascoe	Great Britain	2	23.97
4	Hannah Afriyie	Ghana	3	24.38
5	María Luisa Vilca	Peru	1	24.46
6	Josefa Vicent	Uruguay	7	25.09
7	Meas Kheng	Khmer Republic	5	25.86

=== Heat 4 ===
Rank	Name	Nationality	Lane	Time
1	Ellen Strophal	East Germany	1	23.54
2	Pam Greene	United States	7	23.96
3	Una Morris	Jamaica	6	23.99
4	Pirjo Wilmi	Finland	3	24.16
5	Rose Musani	Uganda	5	25.37
6	Laura Pierre	Trinidad and Tobago	4	26.32
-	Eva Glesková	Czechoslovakia	2	DNS

=== Heat 5 ===
Rank	Name	Nationality	Lane	Time
1	Irena Szewińska	Poland	3	23.37
2	Christiane Krause	West Germany	7	23.51
3	Jackie Thompson	United States	6	23.67
4	Karoline Käfer	Austria	1	24.42
5	Russel Carrero	Nicaragua	5	28.02
-	Silvia Chivas	Cuba	2	DNS
-	Claudette Powell	Bahamas	4	DNS

=== Heat 6 ===
Rank	Name	Nationality	Lane	Time
1	Marina Sidorova	Soviet Union	5	23.46
2	Sylviane Telliez	France	4	23.51
3	Christina Heinich	East Germany	6	23.90
4	Margaret Critchley	Great Britain	2	24.04
5	Marcia Trotman	Barbados	7	24.06
6	Beatrice Lungu	Zambia	1	25.11
7	Fatima El-Faquir	Morocco	3	25.27

== Quarterfinals ==
Top four in each heat advanced to semifinal round (blue).

=== Heat 1 ===
Rank	Name	Nationality	Lane	Time
1	Irena Szewińska	Poland	7	22.79
2	Nadezhda Besfamilnaya	Soviet Union	3	23.20
3	Christina Heinich	East Germany	6	23.23
4	Barbara Ferrell	United States	1	23.30
5	Una Morris	Jamaica	5	23.62
6	Marcia Trotman	Barbados	2	24.00
7	Amelita Alanes	Philippines	4	24.98
-	Josefa Vicent	Uruguay	8	DNS

=== Heat 2 ===
Rank	Name	Nationality	Lane	Time
1	Ellen Strophal	East Germany	8	22.93
2	Alice Anum	Ghana	5	22.95
3	Wilma van Gool	Netherlands	2	23.22
4	Christiane Krause	West Germany	4	23.22
5	Della Pascoe	Great Britain	73	23.72
6	Juana Mosquera	Colombia	1	24.00
7	María Luisa Vilca	Peru	7	24.48
8	Rose Musani	Uganda	6	25.28

=== Heat 3 ===
Rank	Name	Nationality	Lane	Time
1	Renate Stecher	East Germany	1	23.31
2	Rosie Allwood	Jamaica	7	23.33
3	Sylviane Telliez	France	8	23.69
4	Donna Murray	Great Britain	6	23.69
5	Pam Greene	United States	5	23.85
6	Karoline Käfer	Austria	4	23.92
7	Hannah Afriyie	Ghana	3	24.47
-	Russel Carrero	Nicaragua	2	DNS

=== Heat 4 ===
Rank	Name	Nationality	Lane	Time
1	Raelene Boyle	Australia	7	23.06
2	Annegret Kroniger	West Germany	3	23.14
3	Jackie Thompson	United States	4	23.22
4	Marina Sidorova	Soviet Union	8	23.33
5	Pirjo Wilmi	Finland	5	23.68
6	Margaret Critchley	Great Britain	2	24.05
7	Carolina Rieuwpassa	Indonesia	1	25.03
8	Helen Olaye	Nigeria	6	25.09

== Semifinals ==
Top four in each heat advanced to the final round (blue).

=== Heat 1 ===
Rank	Name	Nationality	Lane	Time
1	Ellen Strophal	East Germany	7	22.90
2	Raelene Boyle	Australia	3	22.92
3	Irena Szewińska	Poland	6	22.92
4	Rosie Allwood	Jamaica	1	23.14
5	Christiane Krause	West Germany	2	23.17
6	Jackie Thompson	United States	4	23.18
7	Marina Sidorova	Soviet Union	8	23.40
-	Wilma van Gool	Netherlands	5	DNS

=== Heat 2 ===
Rank	Name	Nationality	Lane	Time
1	Renate Stecher	East Germany	8	22.83
2	Annegret Kroniger	West Germany	5	23.05
3	Christina Heinich	East Germany	6	23.28
4	Alice Anum	Ghana	4	23.30
5	Nadezhda Besfamilnaya	Soviet Union	1	23.31
6	Sylviane Telliez	France	3	23.34
7	Barbara Ferrell	United States	2	23.39
8	Donna Murray	Great Britain	7	24.03

== Final ==
Rank	Name	Nationality	Lane	Time	Notes
1st place, gold medalist(s)	Renate Stecher	East Germany	6	22.40	WR
2nd place, silver medalist(s)	Raelene Boyle	Australia	4	22.45	
3rd place, bronze medalist(s)	Irena Szewińska	Poland	5	22.74	
4	Ellen Strophal	East Germany	3	22.75	
5	Christina Heinich	East Germany	7	22.89	
5	Annegret Kroniger	West Germany	1	22.89	
7	Alice Anum	Ghana	8	22.99	
8	Rosie Allwood	Jamaica	2	23.11	

Key: WR = world record; DNS = did not start; T = Tie
