= Addi Tapaa =

2004 film directed by Jeet Matharu

Addi Tapaa (2004) is a Punjabi film, directed by Jeet Matharu.
