= Charles Cornelius =

Indian field hockey player

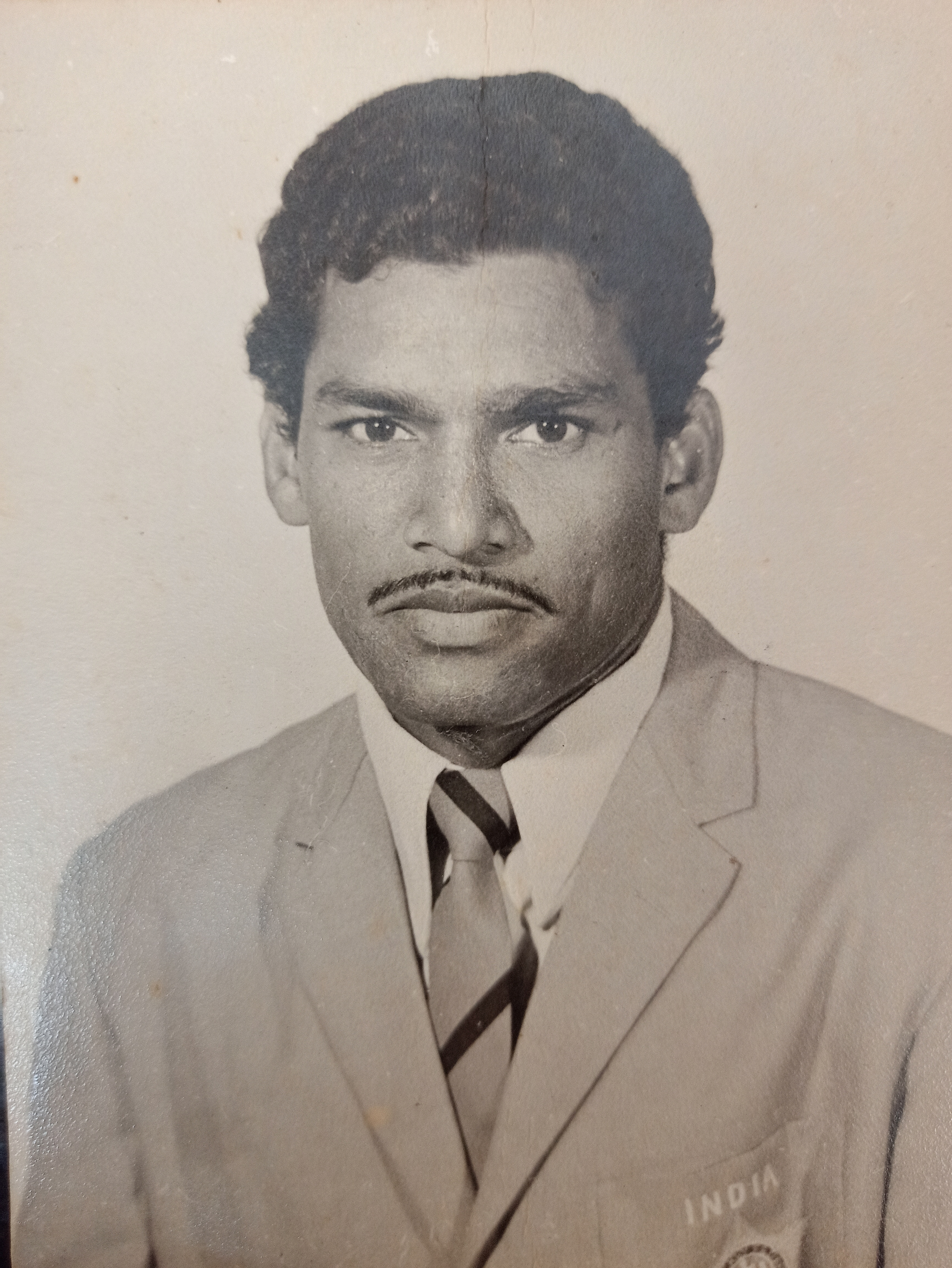

Medal record

Men's field hockey

Representing India

Olympic Games
Bronze medal – third place	1972 Munich	Team

Hockey World Cup
Bronze medal – third place	1971 Barcelona	Team
Silver medal – second place	1973 Amsterdam	Team

Asian Games
Silver medal – second place	1970 Bangkok	Team

Charles Cornelius (born 27 October 1945) is an Olympic Medalist and Former Indian Hockey Goal Keeper who represented the Indian national hockey team in the 1972 Munich Olympic Games (bronze medal) and 1973 Hockey World Cup (silver medal). Started his Hockey career as coach for the Punjab Hockey Team in the year 1977 and retired as Administrator-Officer on Special Duty (OSD-South Zone) in the year 2001.

- Selected as a special trainer for hockey goal keeping by the Indian Hockey Federation (IHF) in the Year 1980.
- Served as the national hockey coach for Sports Authority of India and has trained both the junior and the senior men's hockey teams.
- Been a selection committee member for the junior and senior national hockey teams since 1980.
- Successfully dealt with the state govt and state sports councils, Snipes field stations, and Nehru Yuvak Kendras on behalf of NIS (National Institute of Sports) as a zonal officer for the South Zone (jurisdiction for the states of Andhra Pradesh, Karnataka, Kerala, Tamil Nadu, Pondicherry, and Lakshadweep) for more than 15 yrs.
- In addition, overseen and managed the field wing coaches of the jurisdictions with adequate first hand experience about the field work.
- Functioned as one of the administrators for the Asian Games in the year 1982, SAF Games in the year 1995, and many other international tournaments held in India.
