= Jackie Thompson (athlete) =

American sprinter (born 1954)

Personal information
- Born: July 20, 1954 (age 71) San Diego, California, United States

Sport
- Sport: Sprinting
- Event: 200 metres

Jackie Thompson (born July 20, 1954) is an American sprinter. She competed in the women's 200 metres at the 1972 Summer Olympics.
