= Colin Whalley =

English sportsman

Personal information
- Born: 8 March 1941 (age 85) Irby, Cheshire, England

Sport
- Sport: Field hockey
- Position: Center forward
Senior career
Years	Team	Caps	Goals
1962–1965	Formby	-	-
1965–1985	Hightown	-	-
National team
Years	Team	Caps	Goals
–	Great Britain	20	-
1967–1975	England	49	-

Colin James Campbell Whalley (born 8 March 1941) is an English former field hockey player who represented the Great Britain men's national field hockey team at the 1968 Summer Olympics.

== Biography ==
He played hockey for Lancashire 153 times, and appeared for England 49 times.

He played club hockey for Hightown Hockey Club in the Men's England Hockey League and became their club captain.

While at Hightown he played for England at the 1973 Men's Hockey World Cup in Amstelveen. He was also selected by England for the 1975 Men's Hockey World Cup in Kuala Lumpur

In 1978, he became an England selector and later became the manager of the England in 1980. He managed the team during the 1986 Men's Hockey World Cup, with England finishing as runners-up.

Whalley also played cricket at minor counties level for Cheshire from 1962–1965, making three appearances in the Minor Counties Championship.

He was a bank manager by trade.
