= Rajwinder Singh =

Indian field hockey player

Medal record

Representing India

Men's Field hockey

Hockey World Cup
Bronze medal – third place	1971 Barcelona	Team

Rajwinder Singh, full name Rajvinder Singh Rai from Khusropur, Julhander, Punjab, India, was one of the top Indian field hockey internationals during his peak. He scored a solo goal for India against Pakistan during the semi-final of the 1971 Men's Hockey World Cup in Barcelona.

Prior to playing in the World Cup, Rajvinder, who graduated from Ludhiana Agricultural University, represented the all-India university hockey team for three years, touring the country and internationally. It was while he was a university student that he represented India, and received a roll of honour from his university, making him the first student to receive such an honour.

There he met with Paolo Bonomi from the Italian Hockey Federation, who invited Rajvinder to play for his club in Italy – Geo Gomma, which became known as Paolo Bonomi. There he won four Italian National Championships; three Italian Cups; three Italian Indoor Championships and was five times the national Italian league's top scorer.

Rajvinder's younger brother Amarjit Singh Rana (Amarjet Singh Rai) followed in his footsteps and represented India several times and played the Olympics in Moscow in 1980 when India won the gold medal.
