= Marc Remise =

French field hockey player

Personal information
- Nationality: French
- Born: 5 October 1952 (age 73)

Sport
- Sport: Field hockey

Marc Remise (born 5 October 1952) is a French field hockey player. He competed in the men's tournament at the 1972 Summer Olympics.
