= Stefan Wegnerski =

Polish hockey player

Personal information
- Nationality: Polish
- Born: 25 June 1950 (age 75) Gniezno, Poland

Sport
- Sport: Field hockey

Stefan Wegnerski (born 25 June 1950) is a Polish field hockey player. He competed in the men's tournament at the 1972 Summer Olympics.
