= Vitus Ashaba =

Ugandan athlete

Personal information
- Nationality: Ugandan
- Born: 21 April 1943
- Died: 1985 (aged 41–42)

Sport
- Sport: Middle-distance running
- Event: 1500 metres

Vitus Ashaba (21 April 1943 – 1985) was a Ugandan middle-distance runner. He competed in the men's 1500 metres at the 1972 Summer Olympics.
