= Dismus Onyiego =

Kenyan sports shooter

Personal information
- Born: 19 November 1945 (age 80) Nyanza, Kenya

Sport
- Sport: Sports shooting

Dismus Onyiego (born 19 November 1945) is a Kenyan former sports shooter. He competed at the 1968 Summer Olympics and the 1972 Summer Olympics.

Onyiego was the first native Kenyan shooter at the Olympics. Prior to his Olympic debut, he competed at a tournament at Bisley and finished second. After his career, Onyiego was a police officer, serving as the acting Nairobi Provincial Police Officer as of 1998.
