= Luis Carrera (field hockey) =

Spanish field hockey player (born 1948)

Personal information
- Full name: Luis Alberto Carrera Gortazar
- Nationality: Spanish
- Born: 27 November 1948 (age 77) Gipuzkoa, Spain

Sport
- Sport: Field hockey

Luis Carrera (born 27 November 1948) is a Spanish field hockey player. He competed at the 1972 Summer Olympics and the 1976 Summer Olympics.
