= Jeet Matharu =

Indian film director

- Born: Bombay, Maharashtra, India
- Occupation: Film director,

Jeet Matharu is an Indian film director and assistant director who has directed many Hindi and Punjabi films. He has worked on Addi Tapaa (2004), Sikka (2015), Amaanat (1994), and Ikke Pe Ikka (1994).

== Filmography ==
- Addi Tapaa (2004)
- Sikka (2015)
- Amaanat (1994)
- Ikke Pe Ikka (1994)
- Face of the Faceless(2023)
