= Marinus Dijkerman =

Dutch hockey player

Personal information
- Nationality: Dutch
- Born: 2 March 1948 (age 78) The Hague, Netherlands

Sport
- Sport: Field hockey

Marinus Dijkerman (born 2 March 1948) is a Dutch former field hockey player. He competed in the men's tournament at the 1972 Summer Olympics.
