= Pierre Roussel (field hockey) =

French hockey player (born 1949)

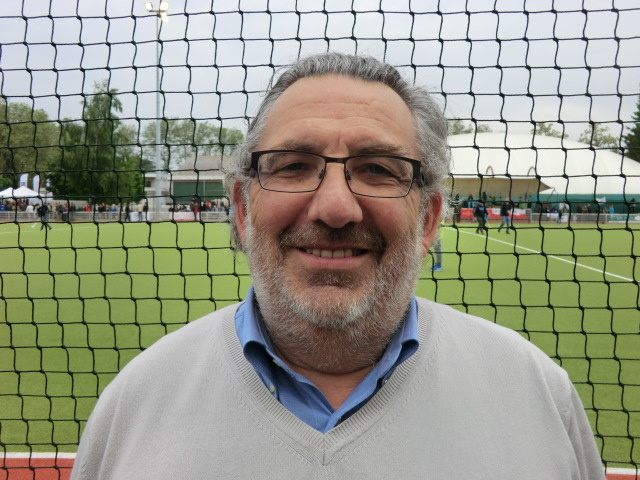
- Pierre Roussel in 2013

Personal information
- Nationality: French
- Born: 16 August 1949 (age 76)

Sport
- Sport: Field hockey

Pierre Roussel (born 16 August 1949) is a French field hockey player. He competed in the men's tournament at the 1972 Summer Olympics.
