= Christian Honneger =

French field hockey player

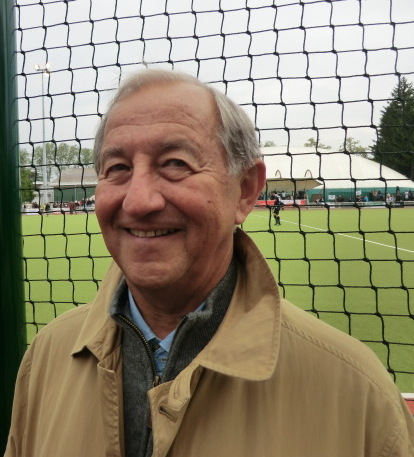
- Christian Honegger in 2013

Personal information
- Nationality: French
- Born: 12 September 1946 (age 79)

Sport
- Sport: Field hockey

Christian Honneger (born 12 September 1946) is a French field hockey player. He competed in the men's tournament at the 1972 Summer Olympics.
