= Francisco Ramírez Ham =

Chilean politician

Francisco Ramírez Ham (born April 16, 1900) was a Chilean politician. A member of the Liberal Party, he served in the Chamber of Deputies of Chile.
