= Dirk Michel =

German field hockey player

Personal information
- Nationality: German
- Born: 23 January 1945 (age 81) Hesse, Germany

Sport
- Sport: Field hockey

Dirk Michel (born 23 January 1945) is a German field hockey player. He competed in the men's tournament at the 1968 Summer Olympics.
