= Jorge Ivorra =

Argentine hockey player

Personal information
- Nationality: Argentine
- Born: 14 December 1942 (age 83)

Sport
- Sport: Field hockey

Jorge Ivorra (born 14 December 1942) is an Argentine field hockey player. He competed in the men's tournament at the 1976 Summer Olympics.
