= Rui Saldanha =

British field hockey player

Personal information
- Full name: Rui Ninnian Saldanha
- Born: 21 October 1947 (age 78) Saligao, Goa, Portuguese India
- Height: 171 cm (5 ft 7 in)
- Weight: 67 kg (148 lb)

Sport
- Sport: Field hockey
- Position: Right half
Senior career
| Years | Team | Caps | Goals |
| 1966–1978 | Blackheath | - | - |
| 1969–1970 | Durham University | - | - |
| 1972 | Oxford University | - | - |
National team
| Years | Team | Caps | Goals |
| 1966 | Kenya | | - |
| – | Great Britain | | - |
| 1969–1978 | England | | - |

Rui Ninnian Saldanha (born 21 October 1947) is a British former field hockey player who represented Kenya, England and Great Britain at international level.

He was part of the British team that competed in the men's tournament at the 1972 Summer Olympics and later played for England at the 1978 Men's Hockey World Cup.

== Early life and education ==
Saldanha was born in Saligao, Goa, then part of Portuguese India, and was educated at St Joseph's Boys' High School, Bengaluru. He subsequently lived in Kenya, where he was selected for the national hockey team and represented the country at a tournament in Hamburg in 1966.

After moving to England, Saldanha studied medicine for a year at the London Hospital Medical College and played his hockey for Blackheath. He later switched to an honours course in economics and psychology at Durham University, where he was a member of Hatfield College, graduating in 1971.

In addition to representing Durham at hockey he served as president of the Durham University Athletic Union. He continued his education at the University of Oxford.

== Hockey career ==
After representing Kenya in 1966, Saldanha went on to play internationally for England from 1969. He was also selected for Great Britain and competed at the 1972 Summer Olympics in Munich.

Saldanha continued to represent England during the 1970s and was selected for the 1978 Men's Hockey World Cup.

== Personal life ==
Saldanha later worked for the New York Life Insurance Company in Des Moines, Iowa. In May 1989, he married Indian actress and former Miss India Persis Khambatta at the Polk County Courthouse.
