= Tom Golder =

Australian hockey player

Personal information
- Nationality: Australian
- Born: 10 September 1944 (age 81)

Sport
- Sport: Field hockey

Tom Golder (born 10 September 1944) is an Australian field hockey player. He competed in the men's tournament at the 1972 Summer Olympics.
