= Zain-ud-Din bin Abdul Wahab =

Malaysian sprinter (1948–2022)

Personal information
- Nationality: Malaysian
- Born: 14 May 1948
- Died: 7 June 2022 (aged 74)

Sport
- Sport: Sprinting
- Event: 100 metres

Zain-ud-Din bin Abdul Wahab (14 May 1948 – 7 June 2022) was a Malaysian sprinter. He competed in the men's 100 metres at the 1972 Summer Olympics. He died from a respiratory disease on 7 June 2022, at the age of 74.
