= Rubén Vasconcelos =

Mexican field hockey player (born 1949)

Rubén Vasconcelos (born 2 August 1949) is a Mexican former field hockey player who competed in the 1972 Summer Olympics.
