= Gilles Capelle =

French field hockey player

Personal information
- Nationality: French
- Born: 14 June 1949 Saint-Ouen-sur-Seine, France
- Died: 15 February 2021 (aged 71) Oudon, France

Sport
- Sport: Field hockey

Gilles Capelle (14 June 1949 – 15 February 2021) was a French field hockey player. He competed in the men's tournament at the 1972 Summer Olympics.
