= Blackheath Hockey Club =

Hockey club

- Full name: Blackheath & Elthamians Hockey Club
- Short name: BEHC
- Founded: 1861; 164 years ago
- Ground: College Meadow
- Chairman: Matt Wilde
- Coach: Nikki Alexander-Lloyd
- League: EH South East Men's Premier Division
- Website: http://www.blackheath.co.uk/

Blackheath & Elthamians Hockey Club formerly Blackheath Hockey Club is a field hockey club based at the College Meadow Pavilion & Astro in Eltham London.

It is officially the oldest hockey club in the world after being formed in 1861 by the Old Boys of Blackheath Proprietary School.

Blackheath & Elthamians runs eight men's teams, five women's teams and a large junior section. The Men's First Team play in the EH South East Men's Premier Division and the Women's First Team play in the EH South East Women's Division 1 East.

In 2012 the club relocated from its home at Rubens Street in Catford, London SE6 of over 50 years to College Meadow within the grounds of Eltham College. The Club was renamed Blackheath and Elthamians Hockey Club to reflect this partnership.

== Early history ==
During the early 1860s Hockey was more popular than Football, and there were moves to reduce the amount of football played and for the 1864/65 season the Hockey section split from the Football section which became Blackheath Rugby Club.

== Major Honours ==
- 1983–84 Men's National League Runner-Up
- 1984–85 Men's National League Runner-up

== Notable players ==
=== Men's internationals ===
Extended content

Player	Events/Notes	Ref
(England) Joe Ahmad	WC (1973)	
(Wales) Albert Angear		
(Wales) Charles Angear		
(Wales) Chris Glenny		
(Wales) David Hallworth		
(England) Rui Saldanha	Oly (1972), WC (1978)	
(England) William Smith	1909–1913	
(Wales) Ian Towler		

Key

- Oly = Olympic Games
- CG = Commonwealth Games
- WC = World Cup
- CT = Champions Trophy
- EC = European Championships
