= Laeeq Ahmed =

Pakistani commentator, broadcaster (1933–2014)

Professor Laeeq Ahmed
- Born: Laeeq Ahmed Khan; 29 October 1933; Punjab, British India
- Died: 27 January 2014 (aged 80); Islamabad, Pakistan
- Burial place: H-11 Cemetery, Islamabad
- Education: Government College, Lahore (B.Sc); University of the Punjab (M.S., M.P.Adm.); Queen Mary University of London
- Occupations: Commentator; broadcaster; educationist; radio presenter; television presenter
- Years active: 1964 – 2013
- Employer(s): Pakistan Television Corporation, Radio Pakistan
- Spouse: Nasira Khan
- Children: 7
- Awards: Full list

Laeeq Ahmed Khan (29 October 1933 – 27 January 2014; sometimes spelled Laiq Ahmed) was a Pakistani commentator, broadcaster, educationist, and radio and television presenter. He hosted television programmes broadcast by PTV such as its coverage of the 1970 general election and launch of Rehbar-I. Primary known for his role in science magazine shows and education, he also organised a talk show during 1974 Islamic Summit Conference.

He produced more than 500 television programmes focused on various topics such as science, environment, global issues and current affairs. His prominent programmes include Science Magazine and Kab Kyon Kaise (When, Why and How). He also used to host science talk shows called 'Science Magazine' at PTV starting in 1965. This TV program ran for 30 years and became one of the longest-running TV show on PTV.

== Early life and education ==
He was born to Siddique Ahmed Khan and Ameena Begum on 29 October 1933, in Punjab, British India (in modern-day Lahore, Pakistan). He obtained his BSc in Statistics from the Government College, Lahore, and master's degree in Physics and M.P.Adm. from the University of Punjab. Later in 1968, he did postgraduate training in Nuclear Engineering from the Queen Mary University of London when the Pakistan Atomic Energy Commission sent him to England. He married Nasira Khan at 24, with whom he had seven children, including five daughters and two sons.

== Career ==
He started his career in 1964 with Pakistan Television Corporation's science magazine. However, his role as a commentator was recognised in 1972 when Zulfikar Ali Bhutto arrived at one of the Pakistan's airports after signing the Simla Agreement.

He participated in uncertain national and international conferences, seminars and workshops focused on social and religious topics such as Islam and Family Planning and subsequently organised a social awareness program titled Mas'ala No.1 (Matter No. 1).

He served in the Ministry of Federal Education and Professional Training from 1980 to 1987, during which he proposed establishment of the Primary and Non-Formal Education Wing, responsible for education development. Prior to joining the Ministry of Education, he worked at various universities and financial institutions such as University of Engineering and Technology, Lahore (UET), Allama Iqbal Open University and the National Bank of Pakistan.

During his last days of the career, he served as director general at the Academy of Educational Planning and Management (AEPAM) until he retired in 1994. Prior to his appointment as director general, he served as a director education and Professor at Allama Iqbal Open University in Islamabad. While working at PTV, his live transmission of 1977 general election was one of his prominent programmes. He produced most programmes between 1960s to 1980s. He was last seen on 16 November 2013 on PTV.

== Major events coverage ==
- Pakistani general election, 1970 – live news coverage of the 'Elections 1970', a 36-hour long broadcast from Lahore, Pakistan.
- Simla Agreement of 1972 – Laeeq Ahmed was the commentator when Zulfikar Ali Bhutto landed at the airport after signing the Simla Agreement.
- Islamic Summit Conference held at Lahore in 1974 – Laeeq Ahmed was again the PTV commentator.
- Pakistan Day on 23 March plus Independence Day (Pakistan) on 14 August each year, were covered by him as a commentator for many years in the 1970s.

== Death ==
Laeeq Ahmed Khan was suffering from a chronic condition and died on 27 January 2014 in Islamabad, Pakistan. He is buried in H-11 graveyard, Islamabad.

== Awards ==
- 1997: Lifetime Achievement Award, one of the PTV Awards
- 1994: Pride of Performance Award by the President of Pakistan
- 1986: PTV Award for the Best Compere on PTV
- 1983: PTV Award for the Best Commentator on PTV
- Sitara-i-Imtiaz (Star of Excellence) Award by the Government of Pakistan.
