= Robert Maroye =

Belgian hockey player

Personal information
- Nationality: Belgian
- Born: 15 May 1954 (age 71)

Sport
- Sport: Field hockey

Robert Maroye (born 15 May 1954) is a Belgian field hockey player. He competed in the men's tournament at the 1976 Summer Olympics.
