= Olivier Moreau =

French hockey player

Personal information
- Nationality: French
- Born: 2 September 1945 (age 80)

Sport
- Sport: Field hockey

Olivier Moreau (born 2 September 1945) is a French field hockey player. He competed in the men's tournament at the 1972 Summer Olympics.
