= Alain Tétard =

French field hockey player

Personal information
- Nationality: French
- Born: 15 January 1949 (age 77)

Sport
- Sport: Field hockey

Alain Tétard (born 15 January 1949) is a French field hockey player. He competed in the men's tournament at the 1972 Summer Olympics.
