= Thierry Havet =

French hockey player

Personal information
- Nationality: French
- Born: 13 February 1952 (age 74)

Sport
- Sport: Field hockey

Thierry Havet (born 13 February 1952) is a French field hockey player. He competed in the men's tournament at the 1972 Summer Olympics.
