= Silvester Ashioya =

Kenyan hockey player

Personal information
- Nationality: Kenyan
- Born: 11 June 1948 (age 77)

Sport
- Sport: Field hockey

Silvester Ashioya (born 11 June 1948) is a Kenyan field hockey player. He competed in the men's tournament at the 1972 Summer Olympics.
