= Jorge Camiña =

Spanish field hockey player (born 1947)

Personal information
- Full name: Jorge M. Camiña Borda
- Nationality: Spanish
- Born: 21 July 1947 (age 78)

Sport
- Sport: Field hockey

Jorge Camiña (born 21 July 1947) is a Spanish field hockey player. He competed in the men's tournament at the 1972 Summer Olympics.
