= Akihito Wada =

Japanese field hockey player

Personal information
- Nationality: Japanese
- Born: 10 January 1947 (age 79) Tokyo, Japan

Sport
- Sport: Field hockey
Medal record
Representing Japan
Asian Games
Bronze medal – third place	1966 Bangkok	Team
Bronze medal – third place	1970 Bangkok	Team

Akihito Wada (born 10 January 1947) is a Japanese field hockey player. He competed in the men's tournament at the 1968 Summer Olympics.
