= Juszczyk =

Juszczyk is a Polish surname. Notable people with the surname include:

- Kyle Juszczyk (born 1991), American football player
- Marcin Juszczyk (born 1985), Polish footballer
