= Avtar Singh Bhurji =

Ugandan field hockey player (1944–2025)

Personal information
- Nationality: Ugandan
- Born: 15 December 1944 Jalandhar, Punjab Province, British India
- Died: 26 January 2025 (aged 80) Esher, Surrey, England
- Height: 5 ft 6 in (1.68 m)

Sport
- Sport: Field hockey

Avtar Singh Bhurji (15 December 1944 – 26 January 2025) was an Indian-born Ugandan field hockey player. He competed in the men's tournament at the 1972 Summer Olympics for Uganda. After the Games, Bhurji continued playing hockey until 1991 until a health condition forced him to retire. He also coached hockey teams for several decades and became a field hockey photographer.

== Early life ==
Bhurji was born in Bika, a village in Jalandhar, India on 15 December 1944. The same year he moved to Kampala, the capital city of Uganda, along with his father, who owned a construction company. He attended Demonstration Primary School and Kololo Senior Secondary School in Uganda before spending time In England where he attended Kingston University in London.

== Career ==
As a member of Uganda's burgeoning Asian population, Bhurji took up field hockey. While attending university in England, Bhurji played for Spencer Hockey Club, London Indians and Middlesex Under-21st. He returned to Uganda in 1969, joining Sikh Union Kampala. It was at the club that he was eventually selected for Uganda's squad for the 1972 Summer Olympics in Munich, West Germany by coach Randhir Singh Gentle. The squad contained six players from Bhurji's secondary school.

At the Games, Uganda finished bottom of its group; in its seven matches, the team lost four and drew three, recording a surprise draw with eventual gold medal winners West Germany. Bhurji featured in six of the side's fixtures, missing only the first match with Malaysia.

While Bhurji was at the Olympic Games, Ugandan leader Idi Amin had authorised the seizure of property from Asians living in the country and their deportation. Bhurji returned home but his father soon decided to flee the country in 1973, rebuilding his company in Nairobi, Kenya. The family eventually settled in London where Bhurji began playing for Blackheath Hockey Club. With Blackheath, he won the National Indoor Championships in 1976.

== Later life and death ==
Bhurji remained heavily involved with hockey, coaching in London for more than two decades and being employed as a professional photographer at hockey matches. He eventually retired from playing in 1991 after spending two weeks in a coma due to a blockage in his portal vein. In 1996, Bhurji suffered a gunshot wound to the leg after he was robbed along with a group of friends while coaching hockey in Nairobi. He is also a qualified civil engineer.

Bhurji died in Esher, Surrey, England on 26 January 2025, at the age of 80.
