= José Luis Partida =

Mexican field hockey player (born 1952)

José Luis Partida (born 30 August 1952) is a Mexican former field hockey player who competed in the 1972 Summer Olympics.
