= Maurice Peter Kagimu Kiwanuka =

Kagimu Peter Kiwanuka

Maurice Peter Kagimu Kiwanuka is a Ugandan politician. He is the son of former Chief Jjstice Benedicto Kiwanuka. He was a member of Parliament of the Bukomansimbi constituency in the Masaka district.

== Background and education ==
Kagimu was born on 22 September 1961 in Kampala, Uganda, to Benedicto Kiwanuka and Maxensia Zalwango. He attended Mugwanya Preparatory School Kabojja in 1967. He completed his Primary Leaving examinations at Savio Junior School, Kisubi in 1971.

He was admitted to Nyenga Minor Seminary in 1974 in the Buikwe District from Senior One to Senior Two, and later joined Kisubi Seminary for Senior Three and Senior Four. He joined St. Henry's College Kitovu in 1978, due to the Liberation war in 1979, and spent only one year there and later joined St. Mary's College Kisubi for Senior Six.

After his A-level education, Kagimu lost his priesthood vocation and instead studied at Makerere University, graduating with a bachelor's degree in economics (1980 to 1983) and a bachelor's degree in philosophy from Urbanian University, Rome in Italy (1984 to 1987). He also holds a Master's degree in Business Administration from the University of Liverpool, United Kingdom.

== Career ==
After leaving Makerere University, he was employed at the Bank of Uganda as a banking officer in the foreign exchange section and at the National Housing and Construction Corporation as an administrative officer; he later returned to the priesthood as a vocation. He joined the Verona Missionaries congregation based in the Gulu District. In 1989, Kagimu became active in politics. He won the Constituent Assembly seat for Bukomansimbi County and joined other Ugandans in writing Uganda's new constitution. From 2002 to 2006, he was a member of the Ugandan Parliament representing the Bukomansimbi Constituency. He was Minister of State of Economic Monitoring at the Monitoring, Office of the President from 2001 to 2006.

He was Uganda's ambassador to Switzerland and Permanent Representative of Uganda to the United Nations, World Trade Organisation, and other international organizations based in Geneva. He served as Uganda's High Commissioner up to January 2016 when he was posted from Switzerland to Nigeria.
