= B. P. Govinda =

Indian field hockey player

Personal information
- Full name: Billimoga Puttaswamy Govinda
- Born: 4 March 1951 (age 75) Somwarpet, Coorg State, India
- Height: 5 ft 7 in (1.70 m)

Sport
- Sport: Field hockey
- Position: Forward
Senior career
| Years | Team | Caps | Goals |
| 1967–19?? | Mohun Bagan | - | - |
National team
| Years | Team | Caps | Goals |
| 1970–19?? | India | | - |
Medal record
Men's field hockey
Representing India
Olympic Games
| Bronze medal – third place | 1972 Munich | Team |
World Cup
| Silver medal – second place | 1973 Amsterdam | Team |
| Gold medal – first place | 1975 Kuala Lumpur | Team |
Asian Games
| Silver medal – second place | 1970 Bangkok | Team |
| Silver medal – second place | 1974 Tehran | Team |
| Silver medal – second place | 1978 Bangkok | Team |

Billimoga Puttaswamy Govinda (born 4 March 1951) was an Indian field hockey player who played as a forward, and a former captain of the Indian national team.

== Career ==
Govinda was considered one of the fastest hockey players during his time and was known for his ball shooting ability.

Govinda's professional career began in the 1967–68 season with Mohun Bagan. In his inaugural season, the team won the Beighton Cup and the first division. His teammates included Olympians Gurbux Singh and Vece Paes.

Govinda played for India in the three Asian Games: 1970, 1974 and 1978 with India finishing second in all the three of them. He also played in the 1972 Summer Olympics at Munich, 1973 World Cup in Amsterdam, 1975 World Cup at Kuala Lumpur which India won beating Pakistan 2-1 in the finals and at the Montreal Olympics in 1976.

In 1972, Govinda was selected for the World XI team. He was awarded the Arjuna Award for his contribution to Indian hockey.

He then took up the role of the selector for the national hockey team.
