= Kevin Rigby =

New Zealand field hockey player

Kevin Rigby (born 4 July 1942) is a former field hockey player from New Zealand, who was a member of the national men's team that finished ninth at the 1972 Summer Olympics in Munich.
