= Rose Musani =

Ugandan sprinter (born 1956)

Personal information
- Nationality: Ugandan
- Born: 8 August 1956 (age 69)

Sport
- Sport: Sprinting
- Event: 200 metres

Rose Musani (born 8 August 1956) is a Ugandan sprinter. She competed in the women's 200 metres at the 1972 Summer Olympics.
