= Thijs Kaanders =

Dutch hockey player

Personal information
- Nationality: Dutch
- Born: 9 February 1949 (age 77) Eindhoven, Netherlands

Sport
- Sport: Field hockey

Thijs Kaanders (born 9 February 1949) is a Dutch field hockey player. He competed in the men's tournament at the 1972 Summer Olympics.
