= Ryszard Twardowski =

Polish hockey player

Personal information
- Nationality: Polish
- Born: 28 May 1948 (age 77) Poznań, Poland

Sport
- Sport: Field hockey

Ryszard Twardowski (born 28 May 1948) is a Polish field hockey player. He competed in the men's tournament at the 1972 Summer Olympics.
