= Tanvir Dar =

Pakistani field hockey player

Personal information
- Full name: Tanvir Ahmed Dar
- Born: 4 June 1947 Amritsar, British India
- Died: 11 February 1998 (aged 50) Karachi, Pakistan
- Resting place: DHA Graveyard, Lahore, Pakistan

Sport
- Sport: Field hockey
- Position: Fullback
National team
Years	Team	Caps	Goals
1965–1974	Pakistan	80	(43)
Medal record
Men's field hockey
Representing Pakistan
Olympic Games
Gold medal – first place	1968 Mexico City	Team competition
Silver medal – second place	1972 Munich	Team competition
Hockey World Cup
Gold medal – first place	1971 Barcelona	Team competition
Asian Games
Gold medal – first place	1970 Bangkok	Team competition

Tanvir Ahmed Dar (4 June 1937 – 11 February 1998) was a Pakistani field hockey player who played as a fullback from 1965 to 1974. He was born in Amritsar, Punjab, British India. He won a gold medal at the 1968 Summer Olympics in Mexico City.

Dar was an established penalty-corner-shooter. He helped Pakistan win the Asian Games hockey title in 1970 and the inaugural World Hockey Cup in 1971 in Barcelona, Spain.

After his elder brother Munir had retired from hockey, the brothers established a hockey academy in Lahore, which was later named Tanvir Dar Hockey Academy.

== Awards and recognition ==
- Pride of Performance Award in 1971 by the President of Pakistan.
