= Julio Segolini =

Argentine hockey player

Personal information
- Nationality: Argentine
- Born: 20 August 1952 (age 73)

Sport
- Sport: Field hockey

Julio Segolini (born 20 August 1952) is an Argentine field hockey player. He competed in the men's tournament at the 1972 Summer Olympics.
