= Warwick Wright =

New Zealand field hockey player

Warwick Birrell Wright (born 2 June 1946 in Hamilton) is a former field hockey player who represented New Zealand at the 1972 Summer Olympics in Munich.
