= Fulgence Rwabu =

Ugandan long-distance runner

Personal information
- Nationality: Ugandan
- Born: 23 November 1947 (age 78)

Sport
- Sport: Long-distance running
- Event: Marathon

Fulgence Rwabu (born 23 November 1947) is a Ugandan long-distance runner. He competed in the marathon at the 1972 Summer Olympics.
