= Piet Weemers =

Dutch hockey player

Personal information
- Nationality: Dutch
- Born: 9 April 1946 (age 80) Eindhoven, Netherlands

Sport
- Sport: Field hockey

Piet Weemers (born 9 April 1946) is a Dutch field hockey player. He competed at the 1968 Summer Olympics and the 1972 Summer Olympics.
