= Resham Singh Baines =

Kenyan hockey player

Personal information
- Nationality: Kenyan
- Born: 17 October 1944 (age 81) Bains, Punjab, British India

Sport
- Sport: Field hockey
- Club: Simba Union, Nairobi

Resham Singh Baines (born 17 October 1944) is a Kenyan field hockey player. He competed in the men's tournament at the 1972 Summer Olympics.
