= Harvinder Pal Singh Sibia =

Kenyan field hockey player

Personal information
- Nationality: Kenyan
- Born: 18 May 1953 (age 72) Nairobi, British Kenya

Sport
- Sport: Field hockey
- Club: Simba Union, Nairobi

Harvinder Pal Singh Sibia (born 18 May 1953) is a Kenyan field hockey player. He competed in the men's tournament at the 1972 Summer Olympics.
