= Malkit Singh Sondh =

Ugandan field hockey player

Personal information
- Nationality: Ugandan
- Born: 5 February 1948 (age 78)

Sport
- Sport: Field hockey
- Club: Simba Union, Kampala

Malkit Singh Sondh (born 5 February 1948) is a Ugandan field hockey player. He competed in the men's tournament at the 1972 Summer Olympics.
