= Leo Fernandes (field hockey) =

Kenyan hockey player

Personal information
- Nationality: Kenyan
- Born: 18 June 1942 (age 83) Goa, Portuguese India

Sport
- Sport: Field hockey
- Club: Goan Institute, Nairobi

Leo Fernandes (born 18 June 1942) is a Kenyan field hockey player. He competed at the 1964 Summer Olympics, the 1968 Summer Olympics and the 1972 Summer Olympics. He is the brother of Kenyan hockey international Hilary Fernandes.
