= Philip D'Souza =

Kenyan field hockey player

Personal information
- Nationality: Kenyan
- Born: 30 October 1935 (age 90)

Sport
- Sport: Field hockey
- Club: Goan Institute, Nairobi

Philip D'Souza (born 30 October 1935) is a Kenyan field hockey player. He competed in the men's tournament at the 1972 Summer Olympics.
