= Francisco Ramírez (field hockey) =

Mexican field hockey player (born 1948)

Francisco Ramírez (born 14 March 1948) is a Mexican former field hockey player who competed in the 1972 Summer Olympics.
