= Renny Pereira =

Kenyan hockey player

Personal information
- Full name: Reynold Pereira
- Nationality: Kenyan
- Born: 9 January 1948 Nairobi, British Kenya
- Died: 1 June 1979 (aged 31) Mombasa, Kenya

Sport
- Sport: Field hockey
- Club: Mombasa Institute

Reynold "Renny" Pereira (9 January 1948 – 1 June 1979) was a Kenyan field hockey player. He competed at the 1968 Summer Olympics and the 1972 Summer Olympics.
