= Upkar Singh Kapoor =

Ugandan field hockey player

Personal information
- Nationality: Ugandan
- Born: 12 September 1937 (age 88) Mbale, Uganda

Sport
- Sport: Field hockey
- Club: Simba Union, Kampala

Upkar Singh Kapoor (born 12 September 1937) is a Ugandan field hockey player. He competed in the men's tournament at the 1972 Summer Olympics. He is the brother of Ugandan hockey international player Jagdish Singh Kapoor.
