= Flip van Lidth de Jeude =

Dutch field hockey player

Personal information
- Nationality: Dutch
- Born: 13 June 1949 (age 76) Zeist, Netherlands

Sport
- Sport: Field hockey

Flip van Lidth de Jeude (born 13 June 1949) is a Dutch field hockey player. He competed in the men's tournament at the 1972 Summer Olympics.
