= Daniel Dupont =

Belgian field hockey player

Personal information
- Nationality: Belgian
- Born: 18 October 1945 (age 80) Uccle, Belgium
- Occupation: hockey player
- Height: 175 cm (5 ft 9 in)

Sport
- Sport: Field hockey

Daniel Dupont (born 18 October 1945) is a Belgian former field hockey player. He competed at the 1968 Summer Olympics and the 1972 Summer Olympics.
