= Balasingam Singaram =

Malaysian field hockey player (1947–2020)

Personal information
- Nationality: Malaysian
- Born: 15 November 1947 Ipoh, Malaysia
- Died: 21 March 2020 (aged 72) Puchong, Malaysia

Sport
- Sport: Field hockey

Balasingam Singaram (15 November 1947 – 21 March 2020) was a Malaysian field hockey player. He competed at the 1972 Summer Olympics and the 1976 Summer Olympics.
