= Jagdish Singh Kapoor =

Indian-born Ugandan field hockey player

Personal information
- Nationality: Ugandan
- Born: 12 September 1947 (age 78) Patiala, Punjab, India

Sport
- Sport: Field hockey
- Club: Simba Union, Kampala

Jagdish Singh Kapoor (born 12 September 1947) is an Indian-born Ugandan field hockey player. He competed in the men's tournament at the 1972 Summer Olympics. He is the brother of Ugandan hockey international player Upkar Singh Kapoor.
