= Irving van Nes =

Dutch field hockey player

Personal information
- Nationality: Dutch
- Born: 18 December 1949 (age 76) Willemstad, Curaçao

Sport
- Sport: Field hockey

Irving van Nes (born 18 December 1949) is a Dutch field hockey player. He competed in the men's tournament at the 1972 Summer Olympics.
