= Manuel Noriega (field hockey) =

Mexican field hockey player (born 1950)

Manuel Noriega (born 7 March 1950) is a Mexican former field hockey player who competed in the 1972 Summer Olympics.
