= Ranjit Singh Sehmi =

Kenyan hockey player

Personal information
- Nationality: Kenyan
- Born: 10 February 1949 (age 77)

Sport
- Sport: Field hockey
- Club: Simba Union, Nairobi

Ranjit Singh Sehmi (born 10 February 1949) is a Kenyan field hockey player. He competed in the men's tournament at the 1972 Summer Olympics.
