= Omar Mohamed Razali Yeop =

Malaysian field hockey player (born 1948)

Personal information
- Nationality: Malaysian
- Born: 9 March 1948 (age 78)

Sport
- Sport: Field hockey

Omar Mohamed Razali Yeop (born 9 March 1948) is a Malaysian field hockey player. He competed in the men's tournament at the 1972 Summer Olympics.
