= George Moraes (field hockey) =

Ugandan field hockey player

Personal information
- Nationality: Ugandan
- Born: 5 August 1943 (age 82)

Sport
- Sport: Field hockey
- Club: Horizons

George Moraes (born 5 August 1943) is a Ugandan field hockey player. He competed in the men's tournament at the 1972 Summer Olympics.
