= Luis Antonio Twose =

Spanish field hockey player (born 1950)

Personal information
- Nationality: Spanish
- Born: 21 November 1950 (age 75) Barcelona, Spain

Sport
- Sport: Field hockey

Luis Antonio Twose (born 21 November 1950) is a Spanish field hockey player. He competed at the 1972 Summer Olympics and the 1976 Summer Olympics.
