= Willie Lobo =

Ugandan field hockey player

Personal information
- Full name: William Lobo
- Nationality: Ugandan
- Born: 20 January 1937 (age 89)

Sport
- Sport: Field hockey
- Club: Simba Union, Kampala

William "Willie" Lobo (born 20 January 1937) is a Ugandan field hockey player. He competed in the men's tournament at the 1972 Summer Olympics.
