= Amarjit Singh Sandhu =

Ugandan field hockey player

Personal information
- Nationality: Ugandan
- Born: 18 December 1954 (age 71)

Sport
- Sport: Field hockey
- Club: Simba Union, Kampala

Amarjit Singh Sandhu (born 18 December 1954) is a Ugandan field hockey player. He competed in the men's tournament at the 1972 Summer Olympics. He is the brother of Ugandan hockey international player Rajinder Singh Sandhu.
