= Elly Kitamireke =

Ugandan field hockey player

Personal information
- Nationality: Ugandan
- Born: 12 August 1931

Sport
- Sport: Field hockey
- Club: Police

Elly Kitamireke (born 12 August 1931) is a Ugandan field hockey player. He competed in the men's tournament at the 1972 Summer Olympics.
