= Sulaiman Saibot =

Malaysian field hockey player (born 1947)

Personal information
- Nationality: Malaysian
- Born: 22 June 1947 (age 78)

Sport
- Sport: Field hockey

Sulaiman Saibot (born 22 June 1947) is a Malaysian field hockey player. He competed in the men's tournament at the 1972 Summer Olympics.
