= Michel De Saedeleer =

Belgian hockey player

Personal information
- Nationality: Belgian
- Born: 11 February 1949 Etterbeek, Belgium
- Died: 19 March 2007 (aged 58)

Sport
- Sport: Field hockey

Michel De Saedeleer (11 February 1949 – 19 March 2007) was a Belgian field hockey player. He competed in the men's tournament at the 1972 Summer Olympics.
