= Antonio Nogués =

Spanish field hockey player (born 1945)

Antoni Nogués
Personal information
- Nationality: Spanish
- Born: 27 April 1945 (age 81) Barcelona, Spain

Sport
- Sport: Field hockey

Antoni Nogués (born 27 April 1945) is a Spanish field hockey player. He competed at the 1968 Summer Olympics and the 1972 Summer Olympics.
