= Yves Langlois (field hockey) =

French field hockey player

Personal information
- Nationality: French
- Born: 2 May 1950 (age 75)

Sport
- Sport: Field hockey

Yves Langlois (born 2 May 1950) is a French field hockey player. He competed in the men's tournament at the 1972 Summer Olympics.
