= Agustín Masaña =

Spanish field hockey player (born 1946)

Personal information
- Full name: Agustín Masaña Díaz
- Nationality: Spanish
- Born: 7 July 1946 (age 79) Barcelona, Spain
- Height: 174 cm (5 ft 9 in)
- Weight: 76 kg (168 lb)

Sport
- Sport: Field hockey

Agustín Masaña Díaz (Note: In this Spanish name, the first or paternal surname is Masaña and the second or maternal family name is Díaz.) (born 7 July 1946) is a Spanish field hockey player. He competed at the 1968 Summer Olympics and the 1976 Summer Olympics.
