= Phang Poh Meng =

Malaysian field hockey player (born 1949)

Personal information
- Nationality: Malaysian
- Born: 7 April 1949 (age 77)

Sport
- Sport: Field hockey

Phang Poh Meng (born 7 April 1949) is a Malaysian field hockey player. He competed in the men's tournament at the 1972 Summer Olympics.
