= Jerzy Choroba =

Polish hockey player

Personal information
- Nationality: Polish
- Born: 26 November 1949 (age 76) Siemianowice, Poland

Sport
- Sport: Field hockey

Jerzy Choroba (born 26 November 1949) is a Polish field hockey player. He competed in the men's tournament at the 1972 Summer Olympics, where his team was eliminated in the group stage.
