= Juan Quintana (field hockey) =

Spanish field hockey player (born 1946)

Personal information
- Full name: Juan Quintana Bosch
- Nationality: Spanish
- Born: 20 November 1946 (age 79) Barcelona, Spain

Sport
- Sport: Field hockey

Juan Quintana Bosch (born 20 November 1946) is a Spanish field hockey player. He competed at the 1968 Summer Olympics and the 1972 Summer Olympics.
