= Sayed Samat =

Malaysian field hockey player (born 1949)

Personal information
- Nationality: Malaysian
- Born: 12 September 1949 (age 76)

Sport
- Sport: Field hockey

Sayed Samat (born 12 September 1949) is a Malaysian field hockey player. He competed in the men's tournament at the 1972 Summer Olympics.
