= Herbert Kajumba =

Ugandan field hockey player

Personal information
- Nationality: Ugandan
- Born: 21 January 1950 (age 76)

Sport
- Sport: Field hockey
- Club: Police

Herbert Kajumba (born 21 January 1950) is a Ugandan field hockey player who is primarily known for competing in field hockey player in the men's tournament at the 1972 Summer Olympics that where held in Munich.
