= Georges Grain =

French field hockey player

Personal information
- Nationality: French
- Born: 20 October 1948 (age 77) Chambéry, France

Sport
- Sport: Field hockey

Georges Grain (born 20 October 1948) is a French field hockey player. He competed at the 1968 Summer Olympics and the 1972 Summer Olympics.
