= Rajinder Singh Sandhu =

Ugandan field hockey player

Personal information
- Nationality: Ugandan
- Born: 21 February 1945 (age 81)

Sport
- Sport: Field hockey
- Club: Simba Union, Kampala

Rajinder Singh Sandhu (born 21 February 1945) is a Ugandan field hockey player. He competed in the men's tournament at the 1972 Summer Olympics. He is the brother of Ugandan hockey international player Amarjit Singh Sandhu.
