= Mohamed Ajmal Malik =

Kenyan hockey player

Personal information
- Nationality: Kenyan
- Born: 28 July 1941 (age 84) Nairobi, British Kenya

Sport
- Sport: Field hockey
- Club: Sir Ali Sports Club

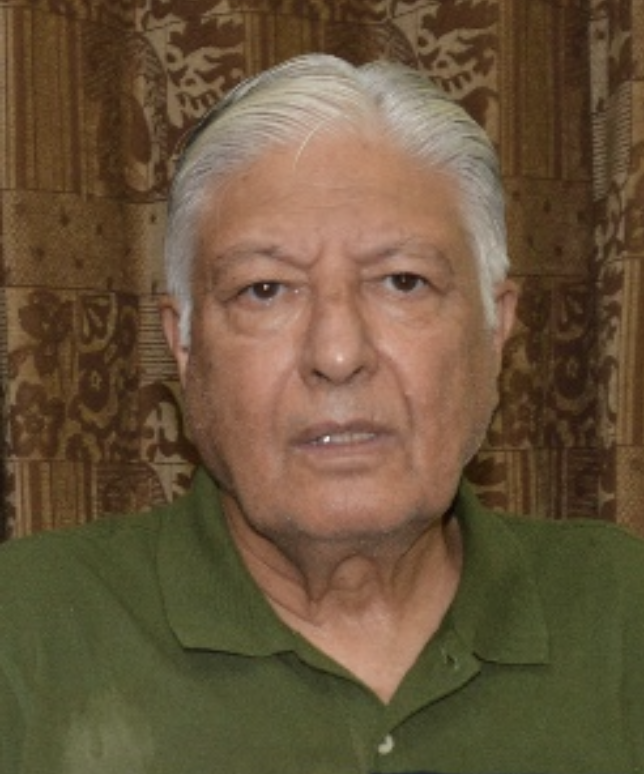
Mohamed Ajmal Malik

Mohamed Ajmal Malik (born 28 July 1941) is a Kenyan field hockey player. He competed at the 1968 Summer Olympics and the 1972 Summer Olympics.

== History of Squash in Zambia ==
Malik retains squash trophy (1985)

Sports Reporter

YOUTHFUL looking 45-year-old "Aji" Malik of Lusaka scooped the Air India Veterans Squash Championship trophy for the third year running.

Malik, seeded one had little competition in Trevor Watson of Nkana in the final yesterday at Nkana Squash Club. He beat him 3–0 in straight sets of 9–1, 9–6, 9–4.

Watson, a few years older at 48 had a hard time returning Malik’s shots especially the well calculated drops.

Because he could not move fast enough away from the ball Watson got several strokes and late balls against him, losing valuable service when he most needed it.

Malik on the other hand was much fitter, energetic and swifter than his opponent and got around the court more easily.

The spectators were treated to a good laugh now and again when Watson, who began each set with a blast broke into outbursts of anger giving himself a good scolding.

According to the cited source, Malik remained composed and courteous throughout the match.

“It is always good to win although competition will be stiffer from next year onwards when more younger players qualify,” he said afterwards.

“Age is against me now, but I am still in the running,” said Watson.

Malik retains squash crown (1986)

Sports Reporter

EVERGREEN Ajmal Malik yesterday retained the Air India veterans squash title for the fourth time when he beat seed three Godfrey Miyanda at the Lusaka Squash Club via a 9–3, 9–6 and 9–3 scoreline.

By his stirring performance Malik who on Saturday beat unseeded Leo O’Keefe 9–0, 9–0 and 9–2 won a return air ticket to India.

And seed two Newton Musanya of Lusaka beat clubmate Louis Wapamesa 9–5, 5–9, 8–9, 9–0 to win the 35–40 years group event.

The over 40-year group attracted considerable interest with unseeded Barry Dunphy who had caused major upsets beating seed four Jack Mutale of Ndola and seed three Crawford Mason of Nkana on his way to the semi-finals and managing to take a game over defending champion Malik.

Malik’s steady play however eroded Dunphy’s court craftmanship and the champion reached the finals with a 9–2, 4–9, 9–6, 9–0 win over Dunphy.

The other semi-final saw seed three Miyanda make his way to the finals with a 9–4, 9–2, 8–10, 9–7 win over seed two Watson.

Miyanda fought his way back from a deficit in the third game and a 3–7 deficit in the fourth to win a match.

In the 35–40 year group, seed four Wapamesa having lost the first game 7–9, successfully took the next three games 9–3, 9–6, 9–6 from Chris Chilufya to gain his berth in the finals.

Musanya had an extremely close fought match against unseeded Jeff Poole, with the former finally taking the match 10–9, 3–9, 9–7, 10–9.

In the finals of the 35–40 year group, Musanya took the first game 9–5, lost the next two 5–9, 8–9 but equalised 9–5 in the fourth game.

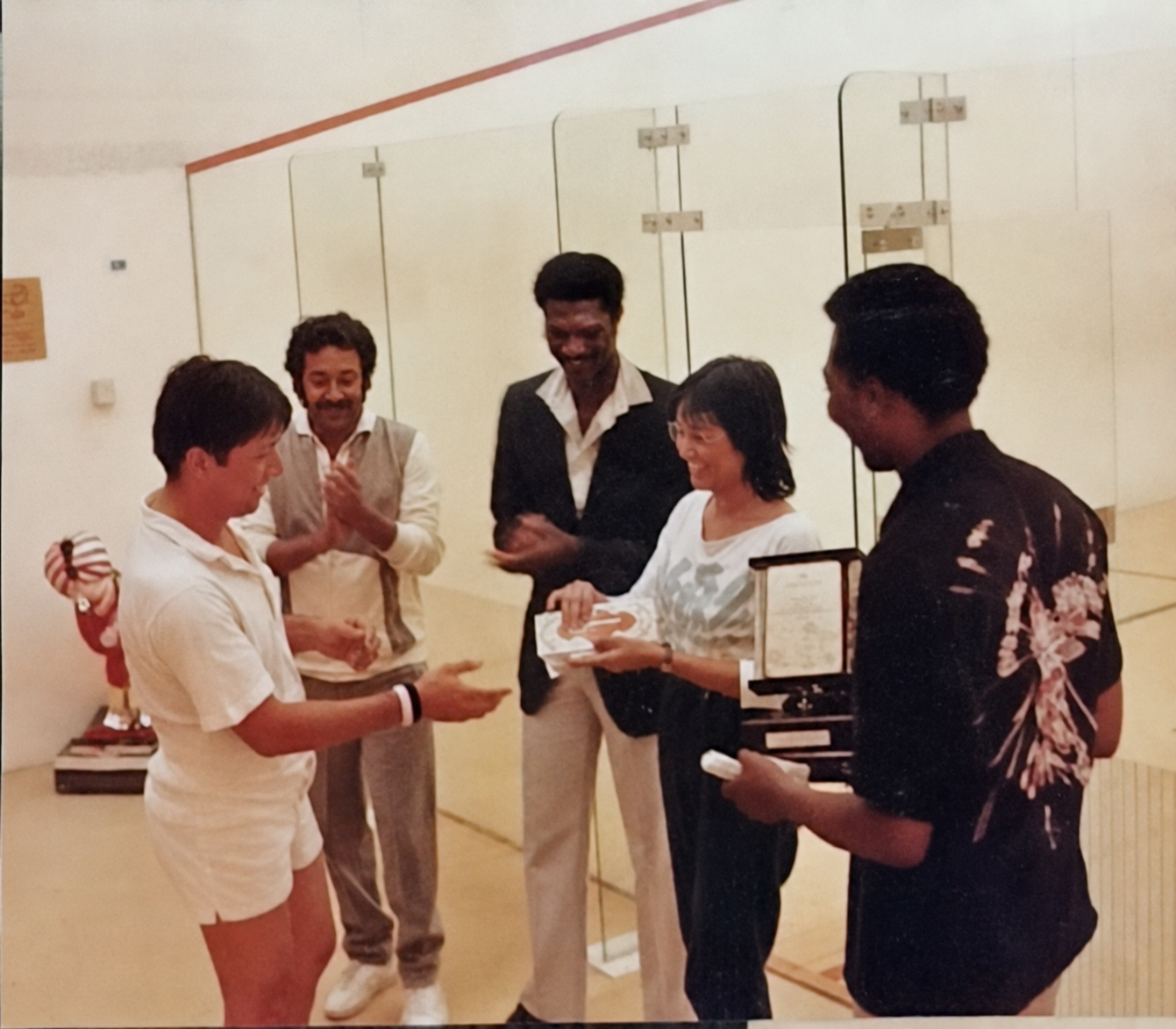
