= Isaac Chirwa =

Ugandan field hockey player

Personal information
- Nationality: Ugandan
- Born: 24 April 1952 (age 73)

Sport
- Sport: Field hockey
- Club: Police

Isaac Chirwa (born 24 April 1952) is a Ugandan field hockey player. He competed in the men's tournament at the 1972 Summer Olympics.
