= Polycarp Pereira =

Ugandan field hockey player

Personal information
- Nationality: Ugandan
- Born: 26 January 1932 (age 94)

Sport
- Sport: Field hockey
- Club: Kampala

Polycarp Pereira (born 26 January 1932) is a Ugandan field hockey player. He competed in the men's tournament at the 1972 Summer Olympics.
