= Jagmel Singh Rooprai =

Kenyan hockey player

Personal information
- Nationality: Kenyan
- Born: 13 September 1944 Nairobi, British Kenya
- Died: 29 November 2022 (aged 78)

Sport
- Sport: Field hockey
- Club: Simba Union, Nairobi

Jagmel Singh Rooprai (13 September 1944 – 29 November 2022) was a Kenyan field hockey player. He competed in the men's tournament at the 1972 Summer Olympics.
