= Ajaip Singh Matharu =

Indian-born Ugandan field hockey player

Personal information
- Nationality: Ugandan
- Born: 11 March 1938 (age 88) Tuse, Punjab, India

Sport
- Sport: Field hockey
- Club: Simba Union, Kampala

Ajaip Singh Matharu (born 11 March 1938) is an Indian-born Ugandan field hockey player. He competed in the men's tournament at the 1972 Summer Olympics.
