= Amarjeet Singh Marwa =

Kenyan field hockey player

Personal information
- Nationality: Kenyan
- Born: 14 November 1947 (age 78) Nairobi, British Kenya

Sport
- Sport: Field hockey
- Club: Simba Union, Nairobi

Amarjeet Singh Marwa (born 14 November 1947) is a Kenyan field hockey player. He debuted internationally on 20 November 1966, against Pakistan, representing his country until 1976. He competed in the men's tournament at the 1972 Summer Olympics. He is the brother of a Kenyan hockey international Harvinder Singh Marwa.
