= Zbigniew Juszczak (field hockey, born 1946) =

Polish hockey player

Personal information
- Nationality: Polish
- Born: 8 September 1946 (age 79) Poznań, Poland

Sport
- Sport: Field hockey

Zbigniew Juszczak (born 8 September 1946) is a Polish field hockey player. He competed in the men's tournament at the 1972 Summer Olympics.
