= Harvinder Singh Marwa =

Kenyan field hockey player

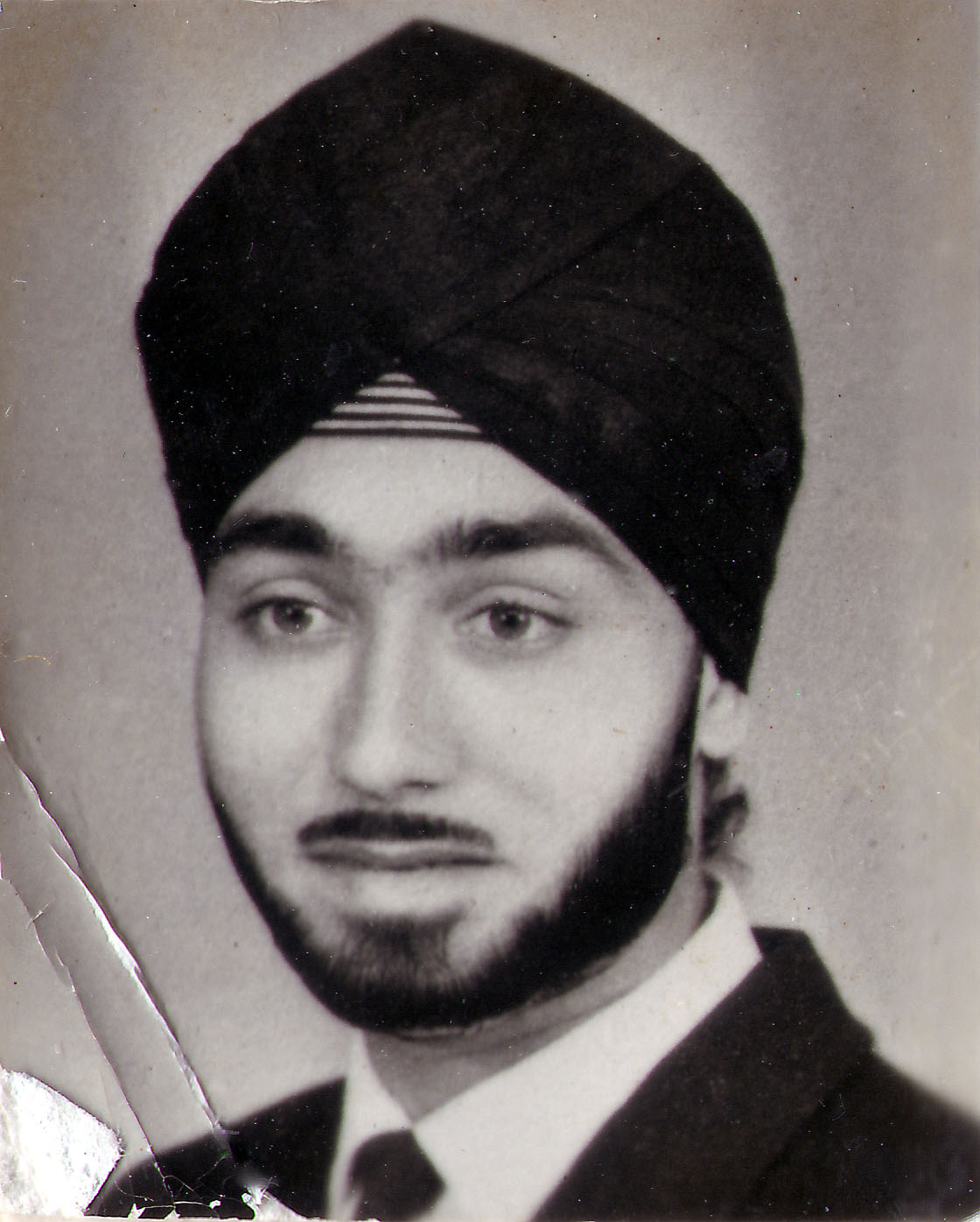
- Harvinder Singh in 1967

Personal information
- Nationality: Kenyan
- Born: 11 September 1943 (age 82) Nairobi, British Kenya

Sport
- Sport: Field hockey
- Club: Simba Union, Nairobi

Harvinder Singh Marwa (born 11 September 1943) is a Kenyan field hockey player. He competed at the 1968 Summer Olympics and the 1972 Summer Olympics. He is the brother of Kenyan hockey international Amarjeet Singh Marwa.
