= Francisco Segura (field hockey) =

Spanish field hockey player (born 1948)

Personal information
- Nationality: Spanish
- Born: 17 June 1948 (age 77)

Sport
- Sport: Field hockey

Francisco Segura (born 17 June 1948) is a Spanish field hockey player. He competed at the 1972 Summer Olympics and the 1976 Summer Olympics.
