= Davinder Singh Deegan =

Kenyan field hockey player

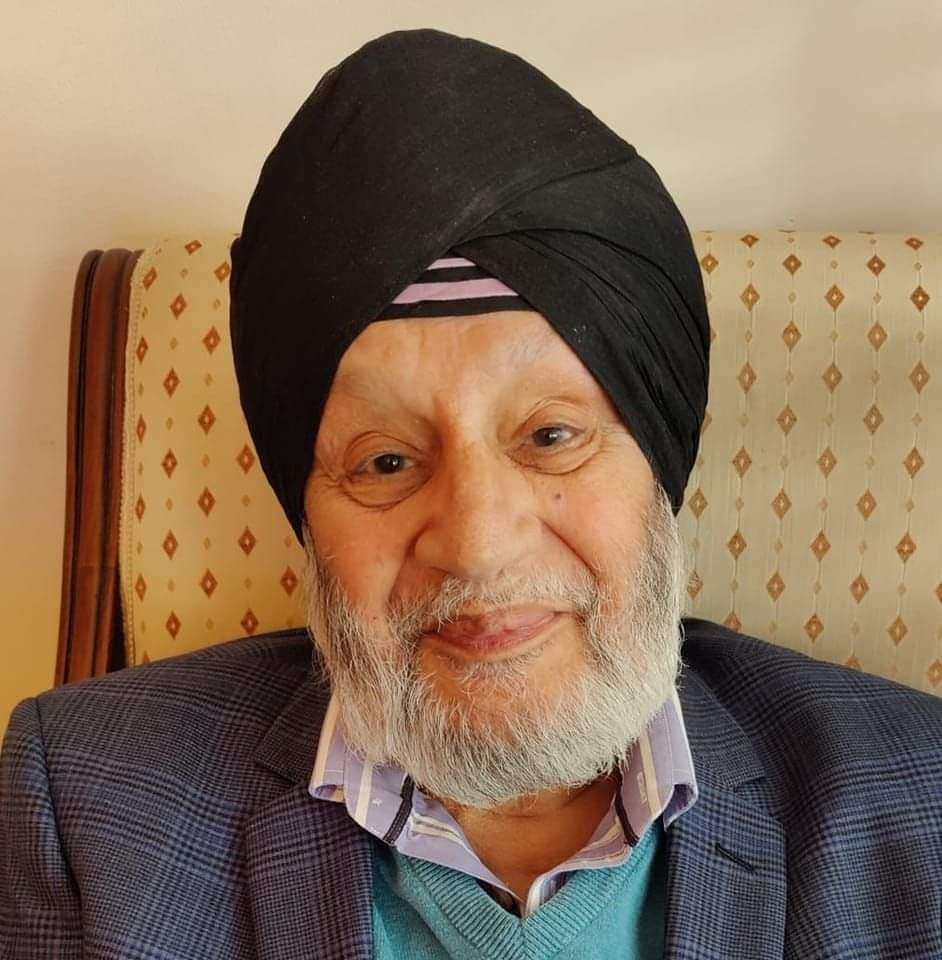
- Davinder Singh Deegan in 2023

Personal information
- Nationality: Kenyan
- Born: 2 February 1946 (age 80) Nairobi, British Kenya

Sport
- Sport: Field hockey
- Position: Centre-forward
- Club: Simba Union, Nairobi

Davinder Singh Deegan (born 2 February 1946) is a Kenyan field hockey player. He competed at the 1968 Summer Olympics and the 1972 Summer Olympics.

== Gallery ==
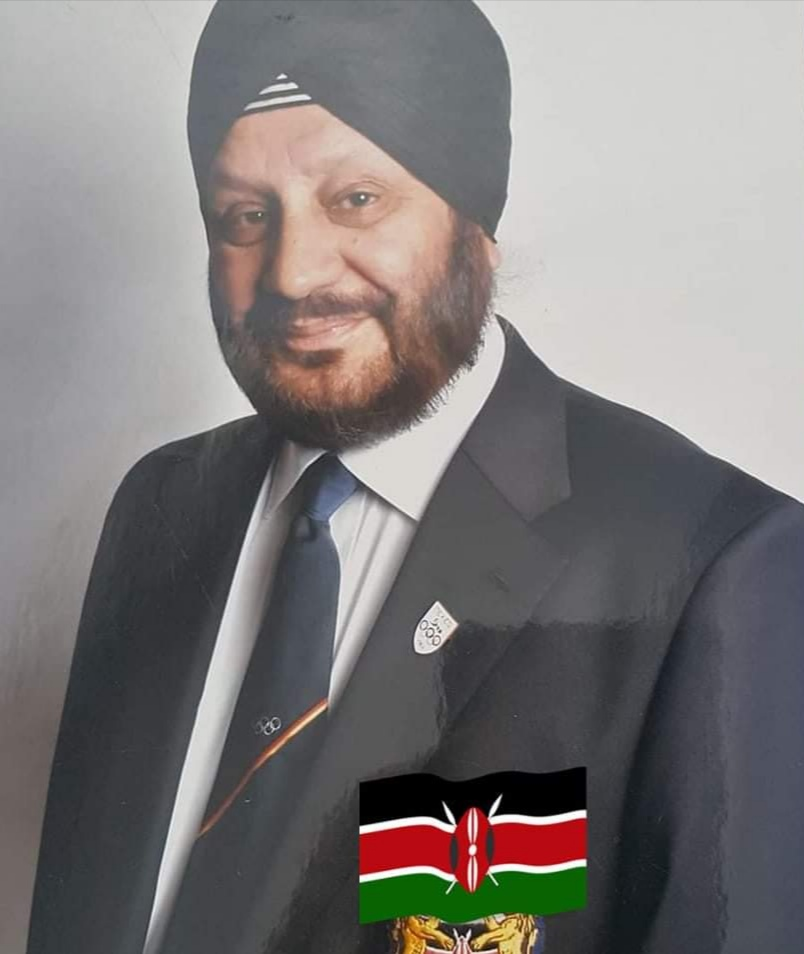
Olympian Dawinder Singh Deegan, former field hockey player of Kenya.
