= Joseph Kagimu =

Ugandan field hockey player

Personal information
- Nationality: Ugandan
- Born: 5 June 1945 (age 81)

Sport
- Sport: Field hockey
- Club: Police

Joseph Kagimu (born 5 June 1945) is a Ugandan retired field hockey player. He competed in the men's tournament at the 1972 Summer Olympics that were in Munich.
