= Brian Santa Maria =

Malaysian field hockey player (born 1949)

Personal information
- Nationality: Malaysian
- Born: 12 September 1949 (age 76)

Sport
- Sport: Field hockey

Brian Santa Maria (born 12 September 1949) is a Malaysian field hockey player. He competed in the men's tournament at the 1972 Summer Olympics.

His career highlight was to be part of the team that finished fourth in the 1975 World Cup.

His younger brother Colin was also a national player and played at the 1984 Summer Olympics.
