= Brajinder Singh Daved =

Kenyan field hockey player

Personal information
- Nationality: Kenyan
- Born: 25 January 1953 (age 73) Nairobi, British Kenya

Sport
- Sport: Field hockey
- Club: Railway Gymkhana, Nairobi

Brajinder Singh Daved (born 25 January 1953) is a Kenyan field hockey player. He competed at the 1972 Summer Olympics and the 1984 Summer Olympics.
