= Jagjeet Singh Kular =

Kenyan hockey player

Personal information
- Nationality: Kenyan
- Born: 16 April 1942 Mombasa, British Kenya
- Died: 12 June 2017 (aged 75) Toronto, Ontario, Canada

Sport
- Sport: Field hockey
- Club: Simba Union, Nairobi

Jagjeet Singh Kular (16 April 1942 – 12 June 2017) was a Kenyan field hockey player. He competed in the men's tournament at the 1972 Summer Olympics.
