= Tarlochan Singh Chana =

Kenyan hockey player

Personal information
- Nationality: Kenyan
- Born: 10 July 1949 (age 76) Nairobi, British Kenya

Sport
- Sport: Field hockey
- Club: Simba Union, Nairobi

Tarlochan Singh Chana (born 10 July 1949) is a Kenyan field hockey player. He competed in the men's tournament at the 1972 Summer Olympics.
