= 1892 NSW Rugby Union season =

1892 Sydney Rugby Premiership
- Duration: 28 May to 3 September
- Teams: 10

Royal Agricultural Society Challenge Shield
- Premiers: Wallaroo (6th title)
- Minor Premiers: Wallaroo (1st title)
- Runners-up: Sydney University A
- Wooden spoon: Sydney (1st spoon)
- Top point-scorer: James Moulton (77)
- Top try-scorer: James Moulton (9)

Junior Badges
- Number of teams: 11
- Premiers: Carlton
- Runners-up: The Pirates

Second Junior Badges
- Number of teams: 25
- Premiers: Sydney University 2nd
- Runners-up: Ryde

The 1892 New South Wales Rugby Football season was the 19th season of the Sydney Rugby Premiership. This was the third competition for the Royal Agricultural Society Challenge Shield and the first competition for the Association Cricket Ground Cup. The football season lasted from May to September. The premiership was won for the sixth time by the Wallaroo Football Club, who had won their last premiership twelve years prior in 1880. Wallaroo defeated their greatest rivals, Sydney University A, in the final to win both the premiership and the Agricultural Society Challenge Shield. Sydney University A were also in the final for the Association Cricket Ground Cup, which was won by the Randwick Football Club. The Junior Badges saw Carlton win the final. Their opponents, The Pirates were defeated in the final for the third year in succession. The Second Junior Badges saw Sydney University 2nd defeat Ryde in the final. The Third Junior Badges was won by Surry, who defeated Grosvenor in the final.

== Teams ==
For 1892 10 teams submitted entries into the Senior Badges. Many of the clubs had competed in the Senior Badges during the last season. New to the ranks were Balmain and Wentworth. Wentworth had played the Junior Badges for a number of seasons and were the current premiers. Balmain was a new club, recently formed. Both the Arfoma and Rosedale clubs decided to focus their efforts on the Junior badges.

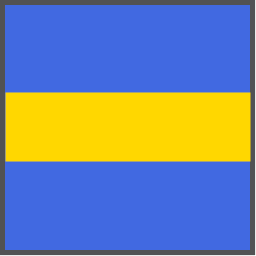
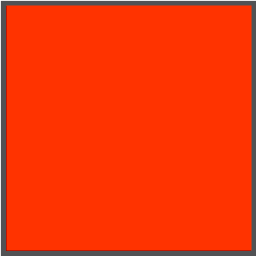
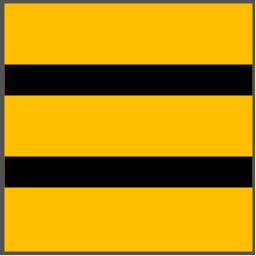
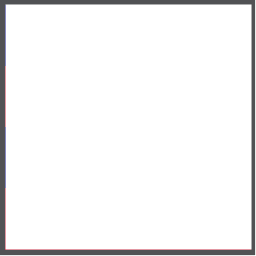
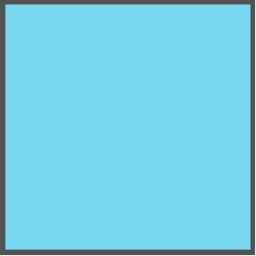
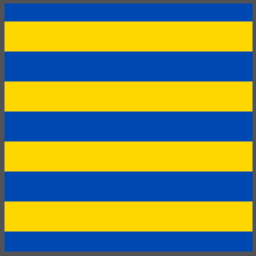
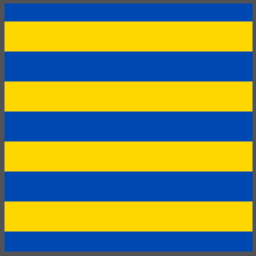
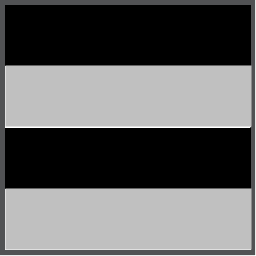
Balmain; Formed: 21 March 1892; Ground: None; Captain: Unknown	Parramatta; Formed: c.1889; Ground: Cumberland Oval; Captain: Fred Bellbridge	Randwick; Formed: c.1882; Ground: Randwick Reserve; Captain: William MacPherson	Strathfield; Formed: 1 April 1886; Ground: Ashfield Recreation Ground; Captain: Henry Braddon	Sydney; Formed: c.1890; Ground: None; Captain: Unknown
Sydney University A; Formed: c.1863; Ground: University Oval; Captain: William Bellbridge	Sydney University B; Formed: c.1863; Ground: University Oval; Captain: Unknown	Wallaroo; Formed: 19 May 1871; Ground: None; Captain: WS Lyons	Wentworth; Formed: c.1885; Ground: None; Captain: H Parker	Zealandia; Formed: 8 April 1889; Ground: None; Captain: George Lusk

== Rule changes ==
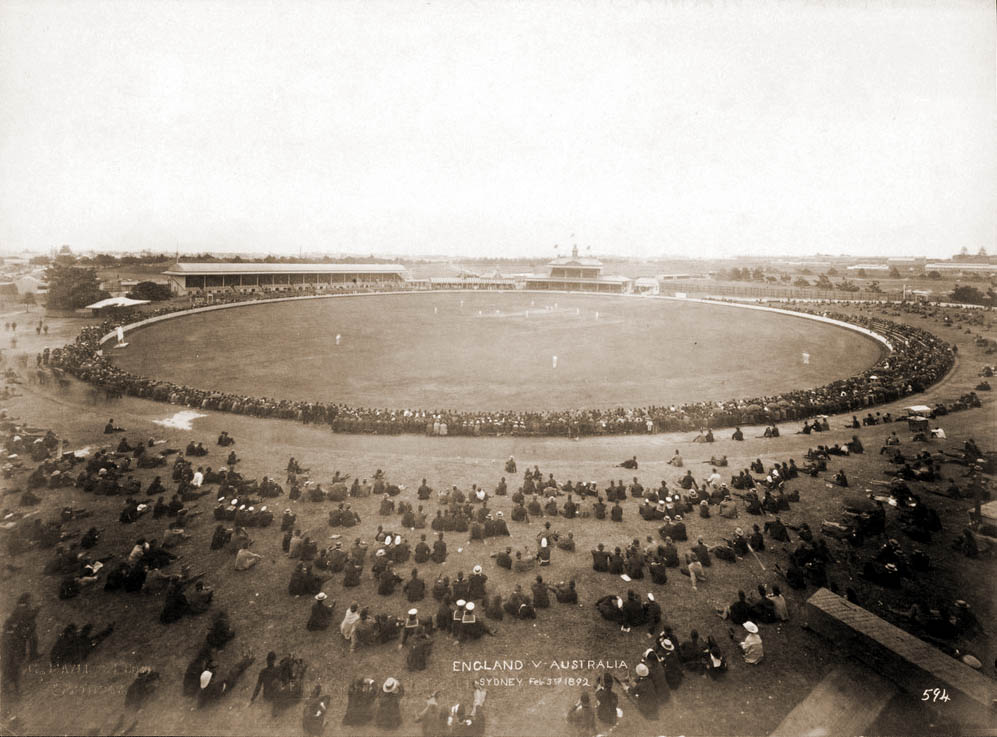
The Association Cricket Ground, February 3rd 1892. C. Bayliss (1892)

At the beginning of the new season, a committee of the Association Cricket Ground generously donated a trophy to be competed for by the senior clubs. How the competition was to be arranged was left up to the Union to decide. With the Agricultural Society Shield and the premiership to also be awarded, the Union attempted to incorporate all awards into one competition.

A round robin style preliminary round was arranged with each senior team playing against each other once. At the conclusion of the regular season, the four clubs with the best records would be drawn against each other in the semi-finals for the Association Ground Cup. The next four clubs from the regular season would be drawn to play against each other in the qualifying round for the Agricultural Society Shield. For the second week, the winners of the semi-finals would proceed to the Association Ground Cup final. The winner of the final, played on the Association Cricket Ground, will win the Cup. The losers of the semi-finals will be drawn to play against the winners of the two qualifying round games. For the third week, the winners of these two games will be drawn against the Cup finalists in the Agricultural Society Shield semi-finals. The winners of the two semi's will progress to the Shield final with the winner awarded the Shield.

As for the Premiership, all of the games contributing to the Association Ground Cup and the Agricultural Society Shield would continue to be added to the ladder. At the conclusion of these games, the team with the best record will be awarded the premiership. With this arrangement, the Premier may not be the winner of either of the two trophies.

At a meeting prior to the beginning of the premiership a motion was put forward to change the name of the union from the Southern Rugby Football Union to the New South Wales Rugby Football Union. A vote was taken which saw this change made.

== Season summary ==
The 1892 Sydney Rugby Football Season was seen as being successful in every way. The weather was everything that could have been desired, with the exception of rain during the last few weekends. Public interest was greater than had been seen during previous seasons. Gameplay had improved with an absence of heavy scrums and an adoption of more passing and kicking, thus making the game open, fast and exciting. Many games were even, with the final result in the balance right up to its conclusion.

The first round of the premiership saw both the Balmain and Sydney Clubs fail to put together a team to play their respective opponents. After this, both clubs withdrew from the competition. All future games that had been arranged against them would be declared forfeits with the opposing club receiving the points on the ladder.

From the beginning of the season, Sydney University A were seen as the winners of the Agricultural Society Shield, based upon past performances. With the club having already won the Shield twice, a third win would see them become the permanent owners of it. They were also favourites to win the new Association Ground Cup. However, after losing their first game against Wallaroo, it was seen that the team were not of the same exceptional high standard of past teams. With many of their top players no longer part of the team, the Varsity did well to become runners-up for the premiership. After the regular season matches had concluded, they found themselves playing in both trophy finals, however losing both. The season saw the re-igniting of their old rivalry with the Wallaroo club, meeting their nemesis three times during the competition. The Varsity won only one of these matches with the other two finishing in close losses for the club.

After defeating the Varsity in the first round, the Wallaroo Football Club played consistently during the season holding the pride of place on the ladder. The manner that the team defeated their long standing rivals demonstrated that they would be difficult to beat. The main strength of the team lay in its forwards, being a large pack. Their back line were not superstars, however they could hold their own on the field. Wallaroo had the fewest points scored against them across the season. The team finished the thirteen matches with eleven wins and one draw. Their only loss came at the hands of the Varsity, where they lost their best three-quarter and had to play the majority of the match with only fourteen players. Wallaroo won both the Agricultural Society Shield and the Premiership, their first victory since 1880.

The Randwick Football Club demonstrated a marked improvement in their performance during the Premiership. Their surprise win over Sydney University in the final for the Association Cricket Ground Cup raised the hopes of all. However the very next round saw them defeated by eventual premiers, Wallaroo. As a team, Randwick were one of the fastest with multiple sprinters in their pack but their forwards were too light.

Zealandia, last season's finalist, started the year strongly. Early in the premiership the team lost the services of their captain leading to their performance to fall away rapidly. The team narrowly missed the semi-finals for the Association Ground Cup and eventually bowed out in the semi-finals for the Agricultural Society Shield.

New to the Senior Badges, the Wentworth club held their own against the older teams. The reigning Junior Champions finished third after the regular season games, making the semi-finals for the Association Ground Cup. Unfortunately they were eliminated from the competition and lost their Qualifying round match against Zealandia. It was hoped that their success in the premiership would encourage other teams to make the step up into the Senior Badges.

Parramatta were a club that never quite reached their potential. As a team they contained many star players and it was believed that they should have finished higher on the ladder at the end of the season. With Fred Belbridge as captain, it was hoped that the performance of the club would improve in the future.

Following a successful 1891 season, Strathfield experienced a decline in 1892 after several players lest the club or stopped playing football. The team recorded only one victory during the season, against the last-placed University B team.

With as many as four teams spread across the Senior Badges and the Second Junior Badges, the Sydney University B team was seen to have lost the services of many players who played in the lower grades. It was believed that, if these players had chosen to through in their lot with them, the B team would not have finished at the bottom of the ladder.

== Ladder ==
=== 1892 Royal Agricultural Society Challenge Shield ===
	Team	Pld	W	D	L	PF	PA	PD	Pts
1	Wallaroo	13	11	1	1	86	48	+38	46
2	Sydney University A	13	10	0	3	207	77	+130	40
3	Randwick	12	7	2	3	89	58	+31	32
4	Zealandia	12	8	0	4	83	62	+21	32
5	Wentworth	11	6	1	4	47	49	-2	26
6	Parramatta	11	5	0	6	68	97	-29	20
7	Strathfield	10	3	0	7	37	89	-52	12
8	Sydney University B	10	2	0	8	15	152	-137	8
9	Balmain	0	0	0	0	0	0	0	0
10	Sydney	0	0	0	0	0	0	0	0

=== Ladder progression ===
	Team	Regular Season									Finals			
	Team	1	2	3	4	5	6	7	8	9	W1	W2	W3	W4
1	Wallaroo	4	6	10	**14**	**18**	22	26	30	34	34	38	42	46
2	Sydney University A	0	4	8	12	16	**20**	24	28	**32**	36	36	40	40
3	Randwick	**4**	6	10	14	14	18	18	**22**	24	28	32	32	
4	Zealandia	4	**8**	12	12	16	16	**20**	20	24	28	32	32	
5	Wentworth	**4**	**8**	8	12	16	20	24	24	26	26	26		
6	Parramatta	4	4	4	4	**8**	8	**12**	16	16	20	20		
7	Strathfield	0	4	4	**8**	8	8	8	**12**	12	12			
8	Sydney University B	0	0	0	0	0	**4**	4	4	**8**	8			
9	Balmain	0	0	0	0	0	0	0	0	0				
10	Sydney	0	0	0	0	0	0	0	0	0				

- Numbers highlighted in blue indicates the team finished first on the ladder in that round.
- Numbers highlighted in green indicates the team finished in the top four on the ladder in that round.
- Numbers highlighted in red indicates the team finished in last place on the ladder in that round.
- Bold numbers indicate the team had a forfeit for that round.

== Finals ==
Cup semi-finals
1	Wallaroo	0
2	Sydney University A	16
3	Wentworth	5
4	Randwick	12

Cup final
Sydney University A	3
Randwick	6

Shield 1st qualifying round
6	Parramatta	5
7	Strathfield	4
5	Zealandia	22
8	Sydney University B	0

Shield 2nd qualifying round
C3	Wallaroo	6
Parramatta	3
C4	Wentworth	0
Zealandia	8

Shield semi-finals
C1	Randwick	3
Wallaroo	7
C2	Sydney University A	20
Zealandia	5

Shield final
Wallaroo	3
Sydney University A	0

=== Week 1, 13 August ===
==== Association Cricket Ground Cup semi-finals ====
The semi-finals for the Cup were drawn through ballot with Wallaroo playing against old rivals Sydney University A, and Randwick taking on new comers Wentworth. Both games were scheduled to play on the Association Cricket Ground one after the other. In the first game, Wallaroo lost the services of their three-quarter, Strange, just before half-time. Even though Wallaroo now played with 14 men, a big handicap against the Varsity, the match remained pretty close. It was during the last twenty minutes of the match that University took command of the game and the scoreline blew out. The Randwick-Wentworth match proved to be a fast and exciting game. Wentworth began the match strong, but Randwick held their resolve. Eventually, Randwick took charge of the game and played what was considered to be their best performance up to that point. Wentworth were given a demonstration of effective passing and game play. The win saw Randwick progress to play against University in the Cup final.

==== Royal Agricultural Society Challenge Shield qualifying round ====
The two qualifying round matches were played together on the Agricultural Society Ground. The draw saw Strathfield play Parramatta and Zealandia against Sydney University B. Poor crowd attendance at the ground saw a stubborn contest between two depleted teams in Strathfield and Parramatta. Parramatta managed to score a narrow victory to move on to the next week of the finals. A fast game was witnessed between Zealandia and University B, the play quickly moving from one end of the ground to the other. Despite the scoreline, the match was seen to be even between the two teams. Zealandia managed to win the match. With these two results, Strathfield and University B were eliminated from the competition.

=== Week 2, 20 August ===
==== Association Cricket Ground Cup final ====
Miserable weather in the days leading up to the Cup final and consistent rain during the game, saw the condition of the ground being very greasy. Considering the poor weather, a large crowd turned out for the match and grew with enthusiasm as the game progressed. Prior to the match beginning, it was the opinion of many that Sydney University A would win the match against Randwick. University drew first blood with James Moulton scoring a skilful try during the first ten minutes of the match. The wet and heavy ball made kicking goals difficult, however many in the crowd believed the Varsity were now certain for victory. Randwick held their own over the next ten minutes of the game and were rewarded with Allan Scott scoring a try to even the match. Once again, the heavy ball denied Randwick a goal. The game remained close with the scores level at half time.

On resumption of the game, university commenced a consistent attack on the Randwick line. Both Henry Abbott and Moulton took numerous shots at the goal from the field, however the sodden ground and wet ball made drop kicking difficult. Eventually play moved towards the other end of the field with Randwick finally on attack. A kick from William MacPherson saw the ball end up crossing the university line. Moulton attempted to fall onto the ball, but it slipped away with Tom McMahon diving onto it and scoring a try for Randwick. With the attempt at goal being unsuccessful, only five minutes was left of the match. After this second try, university went to great lengths to even the score. Abbott displayed superhuman effort, dashing off through the thick crowd of opponents carrying all before him until he sank beneath the grasp of several players. Randwick also got their blood up with the battle raging fiercer than ever. A grand game considering the slippery conditions ended with a victory for Randwick.

1892 Association Cricket Ground Cup final

20 August 1892

Sydney University A	3 - 6	Randwick
Tries: JE Moulton; Goals: JE Moulton 0/1; Drop goals: HP Abbott 0/3, JE Moulton 0/1	report	Tries: T McMahon, A Scott; Goals: W MacPherson 0/2; Drop goals: W MacPherson 0/2, HP Parish 0/2

Association Cricket Ground
Referee: JWF McManamey

==== Royal Agricultural Society Challenge Shield qualifying round ====
The draw for the second qualifying round saw Zealandia facing Wentworth and Wallaroo taking on Parramatta with both games being played alongside each other upon the Agricultural Society Ground. The first match was fairly well contested with eventual winners, Zealandia, having the best of things throughout. Wentworth played nothing like in their old form. Zealandia played at their best despite still not having their captain, Galloway, back on the field. With rain affecting both matches, the crowd was still a fair size. For their match, Parramatta were handicapped with the absence of some of their players. To field a team, they were forced to field five 'pick-ups' who played well. Wallaroo managed to score two tries in the first half of the match, unable to add goals to either due to the nature of the weather. Parramatta were able to score in the second half, but lost the match.

=== Week 3, 27 August ===
==== Royal Agricultural Society Challenge Shield semi-finals ====
Despite the weather clearing up for the morning, the miserable conditions continued during the semi-finals for the Agricultural Society Shield. The first match saw Wallaroo drawn against Cup winners Randwick. Wallaroo won the toss and before ten minutes had passed, replacement player W Gregory had taken a mark with WS Corr kicking the goal from the field. The game became fast and open as a result of this with Frank Surman breaking through and scoring a try for Randwick. During the second half, Wallaroo had the better of their opponents, scoring a try to seal the win. The second semi-final began soon after the conclusion of the first. Sydney University A had the best of the game, stretching out to a comfortable lead in the first half. Zealandia were able to mount an attack on the Varsity line, but were unable to avert a defeat.

=== Week 4, 3 September ===
==== Royal Agricultural Society Challenge Shield final ====
The day of the Shield final saw a beating rain fall for the entire afternoon, however a solid crowd turned out for the match to support their clubs. Considering the conditions, it was expected that the forwards would play a major part in the outcome of the match. Both Sydney University A and Wallaroo put their best team on the field and played the game with great determination. The condition of the ground, due to the weather, was so slippery that it made play difficult. Both the university halfbacks, Henry Abbott and James Moulton, valuable players when the surface is dry, were made ineffective in the conditions. Players were unable to do a great deal of dodging or fending. Wallaroo were all over the Varsity players stopping them from passing the ball effectively, making the game a stop-start affair with short sharp rushes, scrimmages and good dribbling. It was a good deal into the second half before Wallaroo were able to score a try. This spurred both teams to greater efforts with University eventually holding down Wallaroo on their own line. Despite all efforts, the Varsity was unable to break through with the game ending. Thus the close of the football season saw Wallaroo win their first premiership in 12 years and the Agricultural Society Ground Shield.

1892 Royal Agricultural Society Challenge Shield final

3 September 1892
4:10 pm

Wallaroo	3 - 0	Sydney University A
Tries: P Lane; Goals: WP Webb 0/1	report

Agricultural Society Ground
Referee: GW Graham

== Lower grades ==
=== Junior Badges ===
The Junior teams had every reason to be proud of their performance during the season. The class of football played by the teams were at times equal to that of the senior grade. It was believed that many of the players should not be playing junior football, such was their skill. Junior matches were more often opener with passing and kicking more frequent. As the season progressed, the games played became more interesting and the competition became keener. For this season, Farmer & Co. donated 15 silver medals for the winners of the First Junior competition.

The competition for the Junior Badges saw a strange ending to the season. After beating all comers during the year, The Pirates Football Club were unexpectedly beaten in the final by Carlton. The fact that Carlton was victorious in the final did not provide conclusive evidence that they were the better team during the competition. Losing their first match of the season against the Pirates, Carlton improved as the year progressed. The form team for much of the season was the Pirates, being far superior to any other team during a greater part of the year. Unfortunately for them, the Junior Badges did not follow the same format for awarding the premiership as the senior grade. If it did, the Pirates would have been declared Premiers despite their finals loss. Double Bay finished the season with the third best record, however they displayed inconsistency with their performance. The Glebe were believed to be the champion junior of the year but failed to live up to those expectations. In the end Carlton finished the season with the record of winning two premierships in two years but in different grades.

Carlton	Double Bay	Eurotah	Fort Street College	Glebe	Newtown
Petersham	The Pirates	Rosedale	Summer Hill	Wallaroo B	

=== Second Junior Badges ===
The quality of play of many of the Second Junior teams was appreciated by the public. The form of the eventual champions, Sydney University 2nd was superior to that of a Second Junior team. Their play, especially the kicking, was even better than some of the senior teams with one or two of the players capable of playing for the University B or A team. For much of the season, both the Pirates 2nd and Double Bay 2nd teams led the running for the premiership. It was regarded that the final would be played between these two. Amongst the other teams, Ryde continued to show improvement as the year progressed with the team eventually losing to the Varsity in the final. Randwick Borough showed good form only to be eliminated in the semi-final. University 2nd were awarded medals once again donated by AJ Torning.

Arfoma	Balmain Ormonde	Carlton B	Clifton	Double Bay 2nd	Eurotah 2nd
Glebe 2nd	Hawkesbury	Hawkesbury Agricultural	Hunters Hill	Leichhardt	Manly
Liverpool	Neutral Bay	The Pirates 2nd	Randwick Austral	Randwick Borough	Ryde
Rosedale 2nd	Strathfield 2nd	Sydney University 2nd	Sydney University 3rd	Wallaroo 2nd	Wentworth 2nd
Zealandia 2nd					

=== Third Junior Badges ===
For 1892 those clubs entered into the Third Junior Badges would be competing for the Union Medals. The competition saw two teams finish the regular season without loss, Willoughby and Waverley A, with both teams having no points scored against them. Willoughby was defeated by eventual premiers Surry in the quarter-finals, the only points scored against them all year. The Surrys had suffered only one defeat in their run towards the championship in the first round against Willoughby. Surry went on to defeat the heavier Grosvenor team in the final. Grosvenor had amassed the greatest number of points during the season and on their way to the final had disposed of Waverley in the semi-final. The final was expected to be a close and exciting affair however Surry had the better of the match and won easily.

Ardsley	Ashfield	Arfoma 2nd	Balmain Ormonde 2nd	Belmore	Burwood
Enfield	Grosvenor	Hawkesbury Agricultural 2nd	Hurlingham	Leichhardt B	Manly Waratah
Neutral Bay 2nd	Newtown Ferndale	Norwood	Marrickville	Paddington Juniors	Parramatta Union
Petersham Belvidere	Randwick Juniors	Redfern Parkhurst A	Redfern Parkhurst B	Redfern	Rockdale
Richmond	St. Leonards	Summer Hill Oaklands	Surry	Waverley A	Waverley B
Willoughby	Windsor				

== Representative games ==
=== Intercolonial matches ===
==== NSW v. Qld. first match, 23 July ====
New South Wales	Position	Queensland
James McMahon	Fullback	Fred Warbrick
Percy Colquhoun	Half	Jack O'Shea
Henry Braddon (C)	Half	Fred O'Rourke
James Moulton	Half	H Paul
Harry Moses	Quarter	Charlie O'Rourke
Phillip Phillips	Quarter	Danny Allman
Michael Veech	Forward/Quarter	Billy Warbrick (C)
Frank Surman	Forward	AD Graham
George Outram	Forward	George Hensler
Jim Cowan	Forward	J Paterson
Harry Hale	Forward	HW Luya
Edward Bowman	Forward	G Counsell
Vernon Reed	Forward	GC Matheson
Albert Shappere	Forward	JH Stevens
Fred Belbridge	Forward	FJ Lyons

The first Intercolonial game of the season saw what was possibly the biggest crowd seen at the Association Cricket Ground for a football match. The members stand, grandstand and public enclosure were well populated with estimates for the size of the crowd being close to 10,000.

A strong wind was blowing when the game commenced, New South Wales kicking off. Initial play saw the ball moving back and forwards between the two teams as they pressed hard into each other's territory. AD Graham kicked a few attempts at goal, missing both. James Moulton made some slippery linebreaks, the Queenslanders unable to get their hands on him. Eventually, Queenslander Jack O'Shea received a pass from Fred O'Rourke and broke away from the line. Percy Colquhoun chased him in vain with O'Shea scoring near the corner flag. The kick from Graham fell short. After the restart, a failed run from Colquhoun and Frank Surman resulted in Queensland earning a shot at goal from New South Wales' 25. F O'Rourke missed his attempt. A few plays later, Billy Warbrick intercepted a pass and kicked and chased towards the New South Wales line. GC Matherson gathered the ball and got across the line to score for Queensland. Graham missed his attempt at kicking for a goal. Half time was soon called with Queensland leading 6 points to 0.

On returning to the field, New South Wales were without Jim Cowan, who had been injured in the first half. From the kick off play continued to seesaw between the two teams' 25's. Philip Phillips attempted a shot at goal for New South Wales, lacking the direction to be successful. Play soon returned to the Queensland 25 with a kick from O'Shea, against the wind, sending the ball back into their own corner. Moulton, Surman and Vernon Reed were not successful in grounding the ball with the Queenslanders forcing in goal. A run from Warbrick and Petterson took the ball back to the New South Wales line with some exciting play right near the line. At length, O'Shea crossed the line and scored for Queensland with F O'Rourke missing another kick for goal. As soon as play was restarted, Queensland were on the attack again with both O'Rourke brothers attempting shots at goal. Play swung towards the Queensland 25 with New South Wales making a number of attempts at kicking a goal. At length, O'Shea intercepted a pass and made the run of the match. The Queenslander ran down the sideline, escaping two tackles and scored. F O'Rourke attempted another shot at goal, failing to add more points to the Queensland total. The final whistle was blown soon after to end the match.

The final result of the game was a surprise to both the crowd and New South Wales. Even the Queensland players themselves could not believe that they had held onto the win against the wind. Adopting the plan that the British Rugby team had when they played their matches in Sydney, Queensland played three quarters and three halves making the forward pack weaker but the backs stronger. Their forwards were strong in the scrimmage and their backs gave no chance for the New South Welshmen to get through. The Queenslanders played right up to the ball throughout the game, smothering the passing and running from their opposition.

21st New South Wales - Queensland Intercolonial Match

23 July
3:30 pm

New South Wales	0 - 12	Queensland
Drop goals: PB Colquhoun 0/1, PW Phillips 0/1	report	Tries: J O'Shea (3), GC Matheson; Goals: AD Graham 0/2, F O'Rourke 0/2; Drop goals: F O'Rourke 0/3, AD Graham 0/2, C O'Rourke 0/1

Association Cricket Ground
Attendance: 10,000
Referee: JWF McManamey

==== NSW v. Qld. second match, 30 July ====
New South Wales	Position	Queensland
George Lusk	Fullback	Fred Warbrick
James Moulton	Half	Jack O'Shea
Harry Moses (C)	Half	Fred O'Rourke
Ernest Martineer	Half	H Paul
Ernest Roberts	Quarter	Charlie O'Rourke
Malcolm Tunks	Quarter	Danny Allman
Michael Veech	Forward/Quarter	William Warbrick (C)
Ben Newell	Forward	AD Graham
John Gee	Forward	George Hensler
James Heffernan	Forward	J Paterson
Harry Hale	Forward	HW Luya
Edward Bowman	Forward	G Counsell
Vernon Reed	Forward	J Todd
Basil Sawyer	Forward	JH Stevens
Fred Belbridge	Forward	FJ Lyons

The return match between New South Wales and Queensland was held on the Association Cricket Ground on the 30 July. After the result of the first game and the resulting changes made by the local team, there was much interest in the match. With a slightly strengthened forward team and the inclusion of sprinter "Tot" Martineer in the squad, there was hope that the recent defeat would be reversed. The Queenslanders fielded an almost identical team from the previous game. Fine weather met the players as they entered the field to a loud reception. New South Wales won the toss and kicked off against the wind with Queensland defending the northern goal.

From the kick off Fred O'Rourke brought the ball back to half way. Getting a hold of the ball, Martineer managed to make a run towards the Queensland 25. After a lot of scrimmaging, Edward Bowman made a break towards the Queensland line only to be stopped by captain William Warbrick. More scrimmaging within the Queensland 25 saw Ernest Roberts collect the ball and cross the try line. George Lusk took the kick and managed to score the two points. After the restart F O'Rourke took the ball into the New South Wales 25. Several scrimmages back at half way saw Paterson kick the ball back towards the New South Wales line. AD Graham followed up, collected the ball and pushed his way across the try line. Graham then failed to successfully take the kick. The score was now New South Wales 5, Queensland 3. Exciting play in the New South Wales 25 followed the kick off. Multiple rushes from the local team saw play move to the Queensland 25 where they were awarded a free kick. Lusk took the kick and cleanly sent the ball over the crossbar. New South Wales were now up by 6 points. Play immediately moved into the New South Wales 25 from the kick off. F O'Rourke made a dodgy run, breaking through a tackle and over the try line. Graham took the kick, failing to get the extra points. The lead for New South Wales was now only 3 points. When New South Wales kicked off, offside was called as some of their players were ahead of the kicker. A scrimmage on the New South Wales line was the penalty. Lusk managed to kick the ball out of danger before Queensland brought it back. A pass from F O'Rourke sent Jack O'Shea over the try line near the corner. The kick was taken by H Paul but was another failure with the ball falling short. With the scores now tied at 9 a piece, scrimmaging near the New South Wales 25 saw Danny Allman pass out to F O'Rourke who neatly potted a goal from the field. Further play that took the ball from either end took the game up to half time. At the whistle, Queensland were 4 points in front, 13 points to 9.

The beginning of the second half saw an exchange of kicks between New South Wales and Queensland. A line break by Charlie O'Rourke at the New South Wales 25 saw O'Shea miss a pass and more scrimmaging taking the ball back to the centre of the ground. Quick passing from Queensland lead to O'Shea making another dart for the New South Wales line. Just as he was in reach of scoring, James Moulton took him into touch. Play continued to move back and forth between the two ends with O'Shea making a failed attempt at a field goal. Moulton soon had an opportunity himself for a drop goal, but the ball was blocked by the Queenslanders. From the throw in, a line break by New South Wales forward Fred Belbridge was stopped before he could cross over. Queensland kicked out to the half-way line where Roberts caught the ball and dashed back inside the Queensland 25 where he was brought down by George Hensler. New South Wales kept the pressure on the defenders until the ball was slowly pushed back towards the half-way line. A kick took the ball into the New South Wales 25 where O'Shea looked like a certain scorer. Moulton and Martineer pulled him down before he could cross over. Queensland managed to force the ball further on and eventually onto the try line where J Todd leapt onto it and scored. The kick failed to add to the score. No sooner as the ball was kicked the play moved back into New South Wales territory. An intercept by Queensland led to a play that went from wing to wing. O'Shea crossed over and scored again, the kick again failing. The final whistle blew soon after with Queensland in front 19 points to 9.

Despite the radical alterations made by New South Wales, the result still finished against them. The game proved to be essentially one for the forwards, with the New South Wales back line not having much of an effect on the match. Moulton was able to make more runs than in the first match and Lusk provided effective goal kicking. Martineer scarcely got a chance to display his impressive skills, only touching the ball once or twice during the match. Except in goal kicking, Queensland won at all points in the game. Every man was at his best and played an excellent game throughout.

22nd New South Wales - Queensland Intercolonial Match

30 July
3:45 pm

New South Wales	9 - 19	Queensland
Tries: EA Roberts; Goals: GB Lusk 1/1; Drop goals: GB Lusk 1/2, JE Moulton 0/1	report	Tries: J O'Shea (2), AD Graham, F O'Rourke, J Todd; Goals: AD Graham 0/2, C O'Rourke 0/1, F O'Rourke 0/1, H Paul 0/1; Drop goals: F O'Rourke 1/1

Association Cricket Ground
Attendance: 9,000
Referee: JWF McManamey

== Team & player records ==
=== Top 10 point scorers ===
Pts	Player	T	G	FG
77	James Moulton	9	13	6
41	Henry Abbott	7	0	5
27	George Lusk	1	4	4
17	Frank Surman	3	0	2
15	Paddy Lane	5	0	0
15	Albert Shappere	5	0	0
15	Leslie Wickham	3	1	1
13	Cecil McMurdo	3	0	1
12	James Woods	4	0	0
12	William MacPherson	2	1	1

=== Top 10 try scorers ===
T	Player
9	James Moulton
7	Henry Abbott
5	Paddy Lane
5	Albert Shappere
4	James Woods
3	Frank Surman
3	Leslie Wickham
3	Cecil McMurdo
3	Allan Scott
3	Ernest Roberts

=== Most points in a match (individual) ===
Pts	Player	Opponent	Venue	Date	T	G	FG
23	James Moulton	Parramatta	Association Cricket Ground	4 June	3	5	1
15	James Moulton	Wentworth	Association Cricket Ground	16 July	3	1	1
14	Henry Abbott	Wallaroo	Association Cricket Ground	13 August	2	0	2
11	James Moulton	Zealandia	Agricultural Society Ground	27 August	1	4	0
10	James Moulton	Zealandia	Association Cricket Ground	18 June	0	1	2
10	L Scott	Parramatta	Agricultural Society Ground	11 June	2	2	0

=== Most tries in a match (individual) ===
T	Player	Opponent	Venue	Date
3	James Moulton	Parramatta	Association Cricket Ground	4 June
3	James Moulton	Wentworth	Association Cricket Ground	16 July

- Multiple players scored 2 tries in a match.

=== Most points in a match (team) ===
Pts	Team	Opponent	Venue	Date
51	Sydney University A	Sydney University B	University Oval	11 June
39	Sydney University A	Parramatta	Association Cricket Ground	4 June
25	Randwick	Parramatta	Agricultural Society Ground	11 June
22	Zealandia	Sydney University B	Agricultural Society Ground	13 August
21	Parramatta	Sydney University B	Cumberland Oval	16 July
21	Wallaroo	Strathfield	Association Cricket Ground	6 August

=== Greatest winning margin ===
Pts	Team	Score	Opponent	Venue	Date
45	Sydney University A	51 - 6	Sydney University B	University Oval	11 June
31	Sydney University A	39 - 8	Parramatta	Association Cricket Ground	4 June
22	Zealandia	22 - 0	Sydney University B	Agricultural Society Ground	13 August
21	Parramatta	21 - 0	Sydney University B	Cumberland Oval	16 July
21	Wallaroo	21 - 0	Strathfield	Association Cricket Ground	6 August

- Data is incomplete as news reports were inconsistent with their reporting of matches.
