= James Egan Moulton Jnr =

Rev. James Egan Moulton Jnr
- Born: James Egan Moulton; 1870 Tonga
- Died: 1937 (aged 66–67) Austinmer, New South Wales
- School: Newington College
- University: University of Sydney
- Occupation(s): Methodist minister and headmaster

Rugby union career
- Position: Three–quarter
Provincial / State sides
Years	Team	Apps	(Points)
1888–1892	Inter–colonial NSW		

James Egan Moulton Jnr (1870 – 3 February 1937) was a Tongan-born Australian Methodist minister, headmaster and sportsman.

== Early life ==
Moulton was the son of Emma (née Knight) and James Egan Moulton. His early years were spent in Tonga before attending Newington College as a boarding student from 1882 until 1888. Whilst still a schoolboy he played for NSW against the 1888 British Lions Team touring Australia and against Queensland in inter–colonial games until 1892. He has been described as being one of the greatest three-quarters that NSW Rugby has seen. He was also a tennis player and cricketer. He graduated with a Bachelor of Arts from the University of Sydney in 1892.

== Tongan ministry ==
He was ordained and was appointed to the staff of the Tupou College where he was Principal until 1905.

== Australian ministry ==
On his return to Sydney he served in city and country circuits, including Paddington, New South Wales, Parkes, Albury and Windsor before his retirement.

== See also ==
- John Fletcher Moulton, uncle
- Richard Green Moulton, uncle
- William Fiddian Moulton, uncle
- James Hope Moulton, cousin
- John Egan Moulton, grandson

Preceded by James Egan Moulton	Principal; Tupou College; 1895–1905	Succeeded by Charles P. Walkden Brown
