= James Moulton =

James Moulton may refer to:

- James Egan Moulton (1841–1909), English-born Australian Methodist minister and headmaster
- James Hope Moulton (1863–1917), British non-conformist divine
