= Memorial Chapel =

Memorial Chapel may refer to:

- Memorial Chapel (University of Maryland), a nondenominational building on the campus of the University of Maryland, College Park
- Memorial Chapel (Niš), a memorial to the 1999 NATO bombing of Yugoslavia
- Memorial Chapel, The Leys School, a memorial to the first headmaster of The Leys School, William Fiddian Moulton
