= John Saltmarsh =

John Saltmarsh may refer to:

- John Saltmarsh (historian) (1908–1974), British historian
- John Saltmarsh (priest) (died 1647), radical English clergyman
