= St Faith's School =

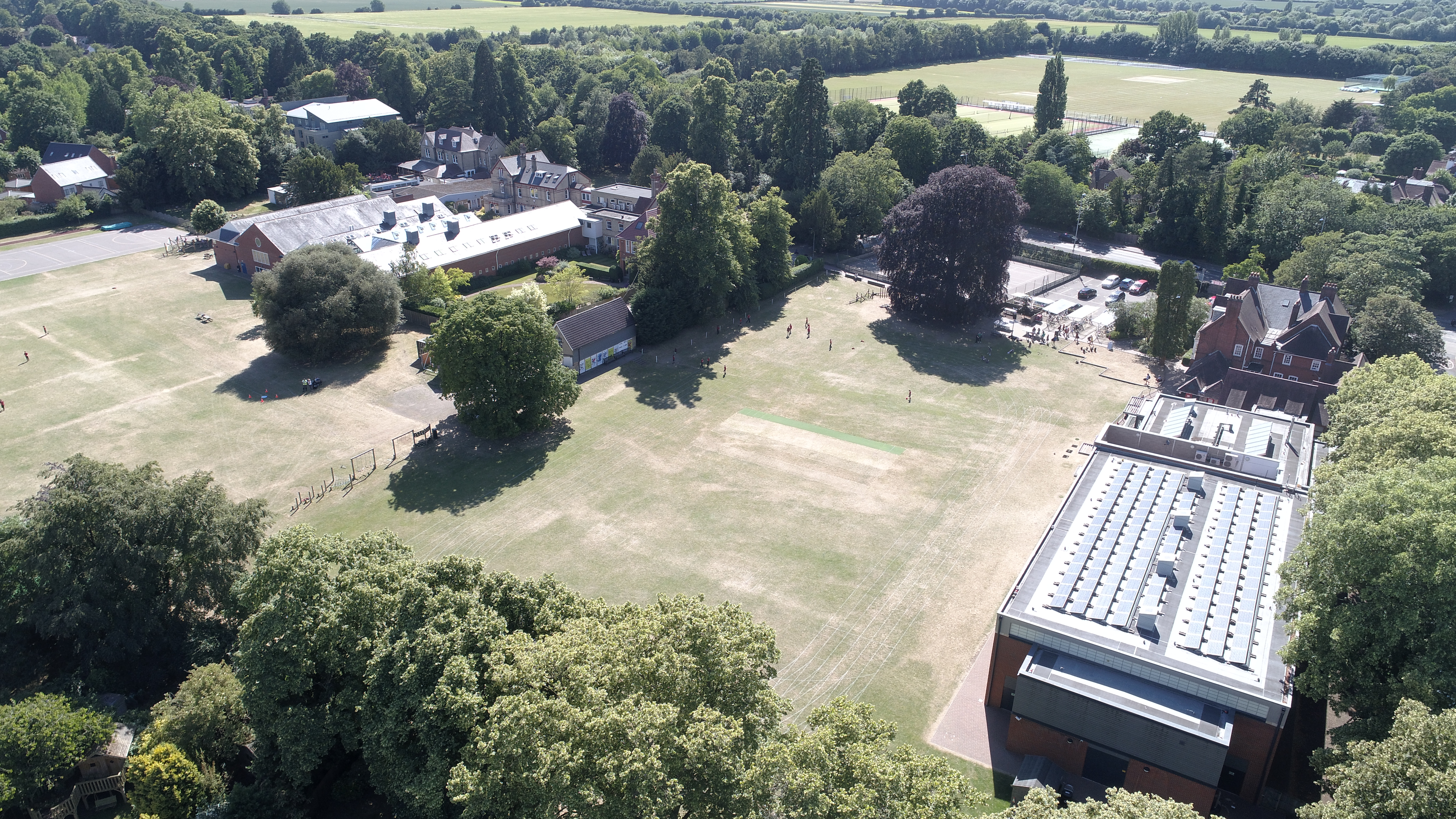

Location
- Trumpington Road; Cambridge, Cambridgeshire, CB2 8AG; England
- 52°11′18″N 0°07′23″E

Information
- Type: Private preparatory school
- Motto: In fide fiducia
- Established: 1884
- Ofsted: Reports
- Chair of Governors: Sir Matthew Rycroft KCMG CBE Full list of Governors
- Headmaster: Dr Crispin Hyde-Dunn
- Gender: Co-educational
- Age: 4 to 13
- Enrolment: c. 530
- Houses: Bentley, Chaucer, Latham, Newton
- Staff: 150, teaching and support
- Alumni: Old Fidelians
- Website: www.stfaiths.co.uk

St Faith's School is an independent day school on Trumpington Road, Cambridge, England, for boys and girls aged three to thirteen. The headmaster is Dr. Crispin Hyde-Dunn. The school has more than five hundred children. St Faith's is part of The Leys and St Faith's Schools Foundation. It is named after the French martyr St Faith.

== History ==
The school was founded by Ralph Shilleto Goodchild, a graduate of Christ's College, around 1884. It features in Gwen Raverat's autobiographical account of her childhood, Period Piece.

The Leys and St Faith's Foundation share the motto (In fide fiducia) and coat of arms.

Until the 1990s, most classrooms were in converted Victorian houses. Since then, the school has built Ashburton, opened in 1999, a large red-brick building. Ashburton was so named because the children were evacuated to Ashburton in Devon during the Second World War. The new building contains the School Hall, where assemblies and plays take place. Ashburton Hall's name commemorates the evacuation of some of the boarders during the Second World War to the Golden Lion Hotel in Ashburton, on Dartmoor in Devon.

In June 2006, the School opened a new building for music and technology, named The Keynes Building in honour of old boys Maynard and Geoffrey Keynes.

In May 2011 a state of the art Sports Centre was opened by Geoff Windsor-Lewis, a prominent Old Fidelian.

In November 2018, a £2M STEM facility named 'The Hub' was officially opened by Professor Lord Robert Mair CBE FREng FRS and Old Fidelian. It is designed to link all aspects of STEM education (Science, Maths, Computing, Engineering, Art and Design) in one large multi-functional space.

In December 2020, the School announced that they had appointed Dr. Crispin Hyde-Dunn as the next head of St Faith's, to succeed Mr. Nigel Helliwell who was due to retire in 2021. Dr. Hyde-Dunn joined St Faith's in September 2021.

== Reviews and awards ==
An Independent Schools Inspection of St Faith's, in April 2017, stated, "The schools meets the standards in the schedule to the Education (Independent Schools Standards) Regulation 2014, and relevant requirements of the statutory framework for the Early Years Foundation Stage, and associated requirements, and no further action is required as a result of this inspection."

An Independent Schools Inspection of St Faith's, in June 2011, reported, "St Faith's is highly and conspicuously successful in meeting its stated aims, especially those aspiring to achieve high academic standards, and provides an inspiring education and a stimulating curriculum." Pupils' achievement was 'excellent'. Teaching across the school was found to be 'excellent', as was pupils' personal development and cultural and spiritual awareness. Pupils' social development was also judged 'outstanding' with the pastoral support a major strength of the school.

The school has achieved Eco-Schools' Green Flag status. In 2014, St Faith's was awarded the much coveted Ashden Award for its pioneering approach to the teaching of sustainability.

The Good Schools Guide reviewed St Faith's as: "Overall, a very impressive school. Plenty of space, an excellent innovative education but, most importantly, a joyous place to be...Curriculum very much based on the future, a very forward-looking school."

In 2018, St Faith's were shortlisted 'Strategic education initiative of the year' and 'Prep School of the Year' at the TES (Times Education Supplement) Independent School Awards, the school ended up winning the former award for taking the bold step of introducing Engineering as a core curriculum subject for all pupils in Year 3 and above. The judges commented "To introduce Engineering as a curriculum subject from age 7 is a bold and inspiration step. We were deeply impressed."

The Independent School Parent Magazine named St Faith's winner of the 2018 Healthy Eating Award. Judges were looking for innovative healthy eating programmes with a tangible impact on the school community.

In 2019, St Faith's announced that they had won the pre-prep/prep school of the year award at the prestigious Tes (Times Educational Supplement) Independent School Awards 2019. They had been shortlisted for the second consecutive year.

== Publications ==
In early 2018, the Deputy Head Academic, Margaret White, released a book titled A Good Education which answered a key question – what constitutes a good education? Published by Routledge, it demonstrates a new 'four-dimensional' model by outlining its origins, implications and practice. The book received positive reviews by former and current headmasters at schools, and the Chief Executive of IAPS (the Independent Association of Prep Schools) wrote, "Anyone who cares about the education of our children should read it".

Since the first Engineering Training Course event in late 2019, St Faith's has trained in excess of 100 schools in how to introduce and run Engineering as a curriculum subject. In February 2020 St Faith's launched their Schemes of Work for Engineering in Year 5, Year 6 and Year 7, which are freely available to IAPS member schools and state maintained schools nationally.

== Old Fidelians ==
Old Fidelians include:

- Tess Howard (born 1999), English international field hockey player, midfielder for England and Great Britain
- Chris Rayner-Hall (born 1977), writer and humanist.
- Lord Robert Mair (born 1950), Geotechnical engineer and Head of Civil and Environmental Engineering at the University of Cambridge.
- Sir Christopher Cockerell (1910-1999), Inventor of the hovercraft
- Dr John Saltmarsh (1908–1974), historian
- John Maynard Keynes (1883–1946), eminent economist
- Sir Geoffrey Keynes (1887–1982), surgeon and bibliographer
- Professor Douglas Hartree FRS (1897–1958), Plummer Professor of Mathematical Physics, University of Cambridge
- David Thouless (born 1934), physicist
- Professor Antony Flew (born 1923), philosopher
- Sir John Tusa (born 1936), Director of the BBC World Service
- Professor Hugh Brogan (born 1936), historian
- Jamie Murray, tennis player; won the Wimbledon Doubles in 2017; first Briton to win at Wimbledon for twenty years; elder brother of tennis player Andy Murray
- Ran Laurie (1915–18), winner of gold medal for the coxless pairs in the 1948 Olympics; father of actor Hugh Laurie
- Rob Huff (born 1979), British motor racing driver; winner of the 2010 World Touring Car Championship; world Touring Car Champion in Macau in November 2012
- Georgie Stoop (born 1988), British tennis player
- Alex Goode (born 1988), rugby player for Saracens F.C. and England
- Paul Svehlik (born 1947), Olympic hockey player
