= John Moulton =

John Moulton may refer to:

- John Fletcher Moulton, Baron Moulton, English mathematician, barrister and judge
- John Egan Moulton, Australian medical practitioner
- Jon Moulton, British venture capitalist
