= Geoffrey Gaunt =

- Born: 1916; Blackpool, England
- Died: 15 September 1940 (aged 23–24) †; Kenley, Surrey, England
- Burial place: Salendine Nook Baptist Church, Huddersfield, England
- Relatives: James Mason (cousin)
- Military career
- Allegiance: United Kingdom
- Branch: Royal Air Force
- Rank: Pilot Officer
- Unit: No. 609 Squadron
- Conflicts: Second World War: Battle of Britain

Geoffrey Gaunt (1916–15 September 1940) was a British fighter pilot who served with the Royal Air Force during the Second World War. A friend of flying ace David Moore Crook, he was killed during the Battle of Britain while flying with No. 609 Squadron.

== Early life ==
Geoffrey Norman Gaunt was born in Blackpool, in the United Kingdom, in early 1916. He was from a well-known textile family and screen star James Mason was a cousin. He went to The Leys School in Cambridge for his education. Once his schooling was completed, he worked for a tobacco company in Huddersfield. He also joined the Auxiliary Air Force (AAF), serving with No. 609 (West Riding of Yorkshire) Squadron. This was a bomber squadron, equipped with Hawker Harts, but in 1939 was converted to a fighter squadron and began to receive Supermarine Spitfire fighters.

== Second World War ==
On the outbreak of the Second World War, Gaunt was called up to serve with the Royal Air Force. He went to No. 9 Elementary Flying Training School at Ansty in October, and once he completed his training there proceeded to the Flying Training School at Cranwell in April 1940, where he was commissioned as a pilot officer in the Auxiliary Air Force. In July, Gaunt then went to No. 7 Operational Training Unit at Hawarden. After converting to Spitfires there, he rejoined No. 609 Squadron on 16 August at Warmwell. There, the squadron was part of No. 10 Group and tasked with the defence of southwest England.

=== Battle of Britain ===
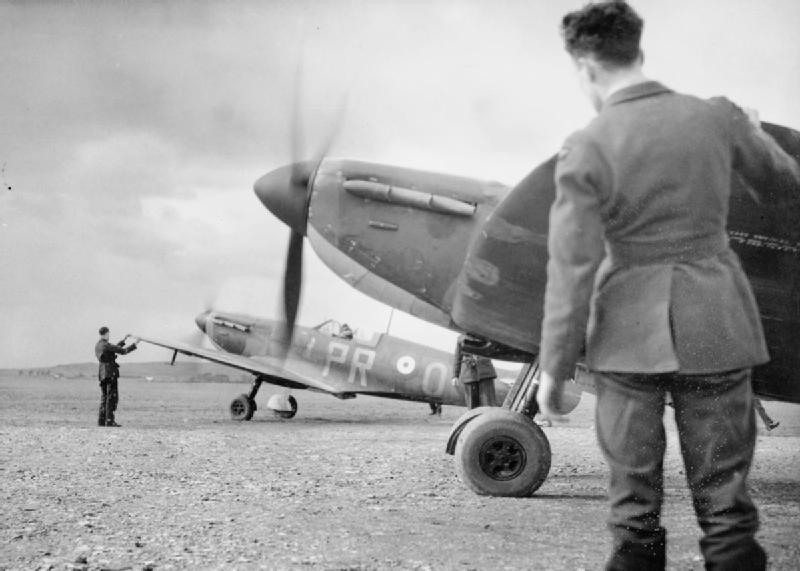
Supermarine Spitfire fighters of No. 609 Squadron, 1940

When Gaunt rejoined No. 609 Squadron, it was heavily engaged in the aerial fighting on the approaches to and over Portsmouth and Portland. He made his first operational sortie on 18 August. A week later, on 25 August, the squadron was scrambled to intercept a large Luftwaffe raid approaching Weymouth and Gaunt shared in the destruction of a Messerschmitt Bf 110 heavy fighter with Pilot Officer Noel Agazarian.

On 15 September, now known as "Battle of Britain Day", Gaunt was involved in a midday engagement with Dornier Do 17 medium bombers over south London. His Spitfire was hit by gunfire from one of the Do 17s and it crashed into the ground near Kenley at about 12:30, killing Gaunt. He is buried in the family plot in the cemetery at Salendine Nook Baptist Church in Huddersfield, Yorkshire. He was a childhood friend of David Moore Crook, a fellow No. 609 Squadron fighter pilot, who wrote in his book "Fighter Pilot", published in 1942, that the death of Gaunt "...was the biggest loss that I had ever experienced".
