= The Leys School =

Public school in Cambridge, England

The Leys School, Cambridge

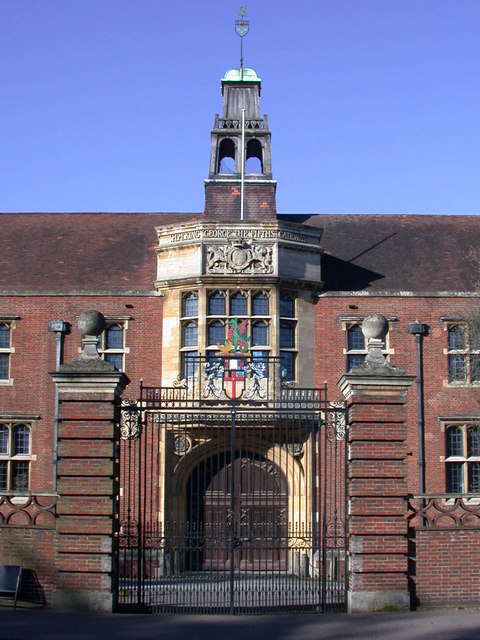

Location
- Trumpington Road; Cambridge, Cambridgeshire, CB2 7AD; United Kingdom; 52°11′48″N 0°07′13″E

Information
- Type: Public school Private boarding school
- Motto: Latin: In Fide Fiducia (In Faith, Trust)
- Religious affiliation: Methodist
- Established: 1875
- Department for Education URN: 110914 Tables
- Head: Clare Ives
- Gender: Co-educational
- Age: 11 to 18
- Enrolment: 565
- Houses: See the Houses section
- Song: Χαίρετε
- Publication: The Fortnightly
- Alumni: Old Leysians
- Rival: The Perse School
- Website: www.theleys.net

The Leys School is a co-educational private school in Cambridge, England. It is a boarding and day school for about 565 pupils between the ages of eleven and eighteen. The head is a member of the Headmasters' and Headmistresses' Conference.

== History ==
The nineteenth century saw the founding of a large number of new schools in Britain, especially by the churches—including the Wesleyan Methodist Church. Although there were already several leading schools that offered an education for the sons of ministers of the church, some Methodists were asking also for schools to be established for sons of lay church members. The Methodist Conference set up a committee to look at the possibility of starting a new school at either Oxford or Cambridge.

Following several visits to Cambridge, they discovered that a twenty-acre (80,000 m^{2}) site called "The Leys Estate" was being offered for sale. The estate was situated within easy reach of the city centre on the Trumpington Road, and it was close to the River Cam and to a number of Cambridge Colleges. The estate was acquired for the sum of £14,275 on 27 September 1872. The Reverend Doctor W. F. Moulton, who had been the secretary of the committee, was asked to become headmaster of the new school. The school opened on 16 February 1875 with sixteen boys, all from English Methodist families. After two years there were 100 pupils.

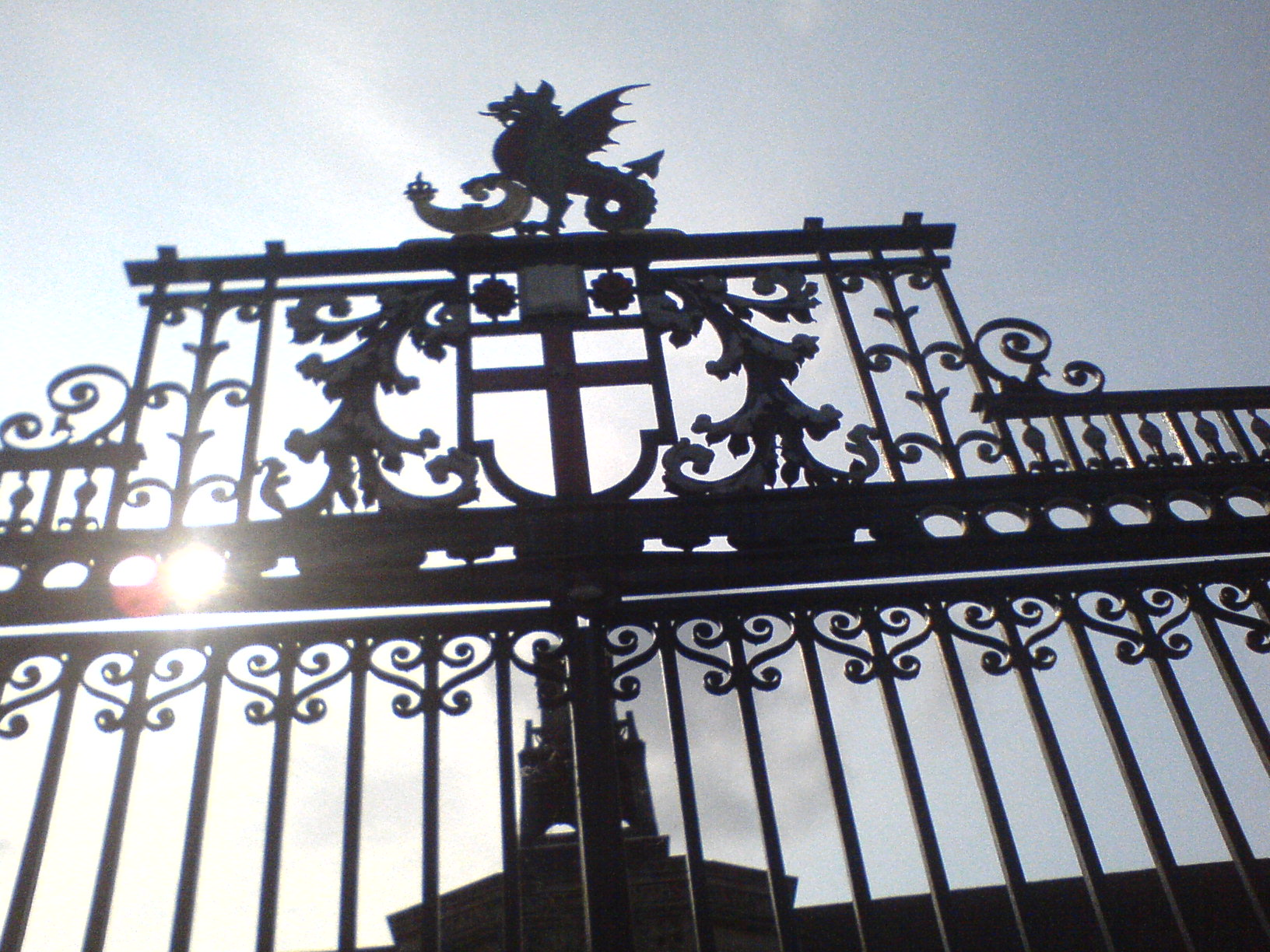
School gates

During the twentieth century, The Leys grew significantly and by 1930 the number of pupils had reached 271. During World War II, the school temporarily moved to the Atholl Palace Hotel in Pitlochry, Scotland, returning to Cambridge in 1946. During the Cold War, the school was designated the auxiliary headquarters to the regional seat of government for Cambridge in time of war. Today the majority of the pupils are boarders and since the admission of girls to the Sixth Form in the 1980s, the school has become fully co-educational. It now accepts pupils from the age of eleven, rather than the age of thirteen as it was before.

== Coat of arms ==
Coat of arms of The Leys School
| Notes Granted 31 March 1914. Crest On a wreath Or and Gules, a wyvern Proper resting the dexter claw on an antique lamp Or flaming Gules. Escutcheon Or, a cross Gules charged in the centre with a mullet of the field, on a chief Ermine an open book Argent embellished of the first between two roses of the second, barbed and seeded Proper. Motto In Fide Fiducia |

The red cross signifies the Christian foundation of the School whilst the open book and the lighted lamp are symbols of learning.

The significance of the red rose is obscure: three such roses appear in the arms of the largest Cambridge college, Trinity, and Cambridge bears two silver roses in its arms. The most likely explanation, however, of the red roses is that several of the School's founders were from Lancashire and likely incorporated the Red Rose of Lancaster to symbolise their origins.

The stars of the original design may have symbolised aspiration or faith and hope in higher things. The wyvern, the crest used by the Wesley family, was presumably added to signify the association of The Leys School with the Wesleyan Methodist Church.

== Principles ==
Despite its Methodist traditions it has, for more than fifty years, been liberal on religion (although never secular). Many pupils received confirmation into the Church of England in the school chapel, and some others have had religious backgrounds from faiths other than the Christianity. Despite its religious liberalism, The Leys is predominantly a Christian school and they state openly that "The School’s Christian ethos lies at the heart of our education philosophy."

Pupils attend a weekday chapel service on a Thursday or Friday morning and in addition are required to attend a number of weekend Chapel services, which happen on Sunday mornings.

The school motto is "In Fide Fiducia" (Latin for "In Faith, Trust"), which is also the motto for its associated prep school, St Faith's School. The two schools make up The Leys and St Faith's Foundation. The school song is Rev. B. Hellier's Χαίρετε.

== Sport ==
The main sports played by girls during the three terms are:

- Hockey (Autumn)
- Netball (Spring)
- Tennis (Summer)
- Cricket (Summer)
- Rowing

The main sports played by boys during the three terms are:

- Rugby union (Autumn)
- Hockey (Spring)
- Cricket (Summer)
- Tennis (Summer)
- Rowing

Optional sports offered in the games programme include swimming, squash, badminton, athletics, S&C, dance and sailing (at St. Ives). In addition, football, basketball and a range of other sports are offered through the after-school activities programme.

The school has a range of sports facilities spread across its 50-acre (200,000 m2) site. Other than the above-mentioned sports, the sports pitches include concrete, grass and AstroTurf tennis courts and a football pitch. Indoor facilities include a fully-equipped fitness centre, a sports hall for indoor sports such as badminton, basketball and netball, three squash courts and an aerobics studio. The school has a 25-meter heated indoor swimming pool and a rowing boathouse on the River Cam, shared with King's, Churchill and Selwyn Colleges.

Famous Leysian sportsmen include Neil White (Olympic hockey in 1948); Freddie Brown (Captain of England's cricket team); Geoff Windsor-Lewis (Wales Rugby, 1960); Paul Svehlik (England and Great Britain Hockey); Neil Christie (Olympic rowing, 1976 and 1980), Will Hooley (USA Rugby), Alex Goode (England Rugby) and James Albery (England and Great Britain Hockey).

== Houses ==
There are 11 houses at The Leys, the oldest being School House founded in 1875.

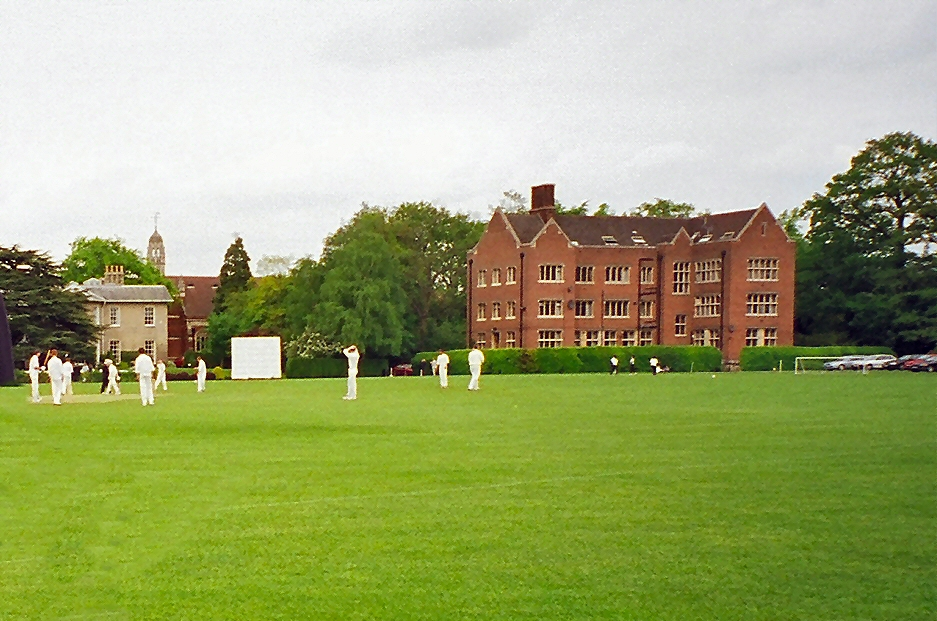
The Stamp Building (right) comprising East House, Moulton Day House, and the Modern Languages Department, with the Headmaster's House (left) and the Chapel behind.

== Goodbye, Mr. Chips ==
The setting for popular 1934 novel and play Goodbye, Mr. Chips is believed to have been based on The Leys where author James Hilton was a pupil (1915–1918). Hilton is reported to have said that the inspiration for the protagonist, Chips, came chiefly from W.H. Balgarnie, one of the masters at The Leys (1900–1930) who was in charge of the Leys Fortnightly (where Hilton's first short stories and essays were published). Over the years old boys have written to Geoffery Houghton, a master of The Leys for a number of years and a historian of the school, confirming the links between Chips and Balgarnie. As with Mr. Chips, Balgarnie died at the school, at the age of 82, having been linked with the school for 51 years and living his last years in modest lodgings opposite the school. Again, like Mr. Chips, Balgarnie was a strict disciplinarian, but would also invite boys to visit him for tea and biscuits.

Hilton wrote, upon Balgarnie's death that "Balgarnie was, I suppose, the chief model for my story. When I read so many other stories about public school life, I am struck by the fact that I suffered no such purgatory as their authors apparently did, and much of this miracle was due to Balgarnie."

== The Leys Memorial ==
The Memorial Chapel of The Leys is situated on the grounds of the school. It was built as a memorial to the first headmaster of The Leys, William Fiddian Moulton. Plans for the chapel, designed by architect Robert Curwen, were first presented to the school's second headmaster, W. T. A. Barber; he deemed the project an unnecessary luxury. Services were held in the school hall until 1904 when the governors approved the chapel's construction. The cost, including all furnishings, was estimated in 1925 to have been £39,000.

The foundation stone was laid at the marble West Door by Princess Helena of Waldeck and Pyrmont on 8 June 1905 and the chapel was consecrated on 27 October 1906. The building's design is Gothic Revival, to complement the surrounding buildings. All visible woodwork is in oak. The roof comprises elaborately worked tussels and tracery work, somewhat after the lines of the famous roof of Westminster Hall. The floor is of alternating black and white marble. The chapel was designed to seat 350 boys, with the west balcony reserved for household staff.

In the First World War, 927 Leysians joined the armed services and 146 of them died. A memorial to the old Leysians who died, costing £48,000 and funded by donation, was on 6 June 1920 unveiled by the Duke of York. The memorial consists of four rows of names divided in the middle by a statue of an armoured St George, below which is written "To The Immortal Memory of Old Leysians Who Fell In The War Of 1914–1919", and in large block capitals the words "My Marks And Scars With Me To Be A Witness For Me That I Have Fought His Battles Who Now Will Be My Reward."

The chapel has fourteen windows; the Governors commissioned H. J. Salisbury to decorate them according to a unified theme. The work was modelled on the windows of the King's College Chapel, Cambridge. Because the Leys is a Methodist school, the work was required to be simple and avoid complex symbolism. All but one of the windows depict passages from the New Testament concerning the story of Christ; the large window over the main entrance, however, shows ten Old Testament subjects foretelling the coming of the Messiah.

The Pulpit is made of oak and has a brass inscription reading "To the Glory of God and for the Preaching of His holy word this Pulpit was carved by Anne Hobson, Helen Mary Chubb, and George Hayter Chubb, and presented by the latter to The Leys, October, 1906."

== The Leys Thistle ==
The Scottish community at the school set up the 'Leys Thistle' in October 1915 in order to unite Scottish families away from Scotland. The 'Thistle' was created by Scottish members of North 'A'. Following the first meeting on Halloween 1915, the 'rush to join was tremendous' and applicants were said to have lied about Scottish heritage to get into the club, such was the demand. The publication of the society was called the Leys Thistle and the first publication was in March 1917.

The first publication of 'The Leys Thistle' states that the club had three rules:

- 'That we, a brotherhood of fellows, united with each other to help and do anything can do to live up to the glorious traditions of Scotland.'
- 'To be an influence for good in the School: although we can't do much, still we can live decent and clean sportsmen's lives.'
- "To keep the society going: although the older fellows are leaving, still we look to younger generations to keep the flag flying.'

== Notable alumni ==
=== Academia ===
- James Moulton (School House 1875-82)
- Sir John Clapham (North 'A' House, 1887–92), historian
- Reginald Hine, historian (West House 1898-1901)
- Eric A. Havelock (North 'B' House 1917-22), classicist
- J. J. C. Smart (School House 1934-37), Scottish-Australian philosopher
- Christopher Smout (North 'A' House 1947-52), Historiographer Royal
- Simon Keynes (School House 1965-69), Elrington and Bosworth Professor of Anglo-Saxon at the University of Cambridge

=== Business ===
- Tanaka Ginnosuke (North 'A' House 1890-93): Introduced rugby to Japan
- J. Arthur Rank, 1st Baron Rank of Sutton Scotney (North 'B' House, 1901–06): Industrialist and film producer; founder of the Rank Organisation
- Amschel Mayor James Rothschild (Fen House 1968-72): Businessman and member of the prominent Rothschild family

=== Politics/royalty ===
- John James Oddy (West House 1882-83): Conservative MP for Pudsey
- Walford Davis Green (North 'B' House 1883-88): Conservative MP for Wednesbury
- Sir Poonambalam Thyagarajan Rajan, (North 'B' House 1909-11) Chief Minister of Madras Presidency, British India, April 4 - August 24, 1946
- Peter Oliver, Baron Oliver of Aylmerton (School House, 1934–38): Judge, barrister and member of the House of Lords
- Richard Taylor (North 'B' House, 1947–53): Physician and independent MP for Wyre Forest
- King Hamad ibn Isa Al Khalifa, current King of Bahrain (West House 1965-66)
- Brent Symonette (North 'B' House 1968-73): Deputy Prime Minister and Minister of Foreign Affairs of The Bahamas
- King 'Aho'eitu 'Unuaki'otonga Tuku'aho (North 'B' House, 1973–77): Current King of Tonga

=== Science ===
- Francis Arthur Bainbridge (School House 1888-93): Physiologist; discoverer of the Bainbridge reflex
- Sir Henry Dale (School House, 1891–1894): Nobel Prize in Physiology or Medicine[Order of Merit]<See e.g. Who's Who 1968>
- Sir Patrick Playfair Laidlaw (School House 1898-99) – Scottish Virologist
- Donald Woods Winnicott (North 'B' House, 1910–1914): Pediatrician and psychoanalyst
- Sir Donald Bailey (North 'B' House, 1916–1919): Civil Engineer who invented the Bailey bridge
- Peter Albert Emerson: Dean of Westminster Hospital Medical School
- Sir Andrew Wiles (North 'A' House, 1966–1970): Mathematician, proved Fermat's Last Theorem
- Robert Mair, Baron Mair (School House, 1963–67)

=== Sport ===
- Richard Bell (North 'B' House 1889-92), cricketer
- G. LI. Lloyd: Wales (North 'B' House 1893-95) rugby union international who played against England 1900, 1901 and 1903
- A. B. Flett (North 'B' House 1890-93): Scotland rugby union international in 1901–00
- Tinsley Lindley (North 'B' & 'A' Houses 1884): Captained the England football team (1888, 1891)
- Frank Handford (North 'A' House 1900-01): English rugby union international who played on four occasions for his country and was part of the first official British and Irish Lions team that toured South Africa in 1910
- Wilfrid Lowry (West House 1914-19): Rugby Union player for Birkenhead Park FC and England international in 1920
- Charles Sutton (East House 1921-24), Anglo-Chilean cricketer
- Denys Witherington (West House 1933-38), cricketer
- Freddie Brown (North 'A' House 1925-29): Captained England cricket team fifteen times between 1949 and 1951
- Alan Skinner (School House 1926-31): first-class cricket cricketer for Derbyshire County Cricket Club
- David Skinner, (School House 1933-38) Captain of Derbyshire County Cricket Club
- Paul Svehlik (North 'B' House 1960-65) field hockey player who played 66 times for England and 31 times for Great Britain, including in the 1972 Munich Olympic Games .
- Justin Benson (East House 1981-84): first-class cricket cricketer for Leicestershire County Cricket Club and Ireland Captain
- Georgie Gent (formerly Stoop) (Fen House 2001-02): Tennis player
- Will Hooley (Barker House 2007-12): Rugby Union player for Northampton Saints, Exeter Chiefs, and Bedford Blues
- James Albery (West House 2009-14): Field Hockey player for England Hockey, Cambridge City Hockey Club, and Beeston Hockey Club
- Andy Laws (Bisseker House 2006-07, West House 2007-10) cricketer
- Alex Goode (North 'B' House 2001-04)

=== Media ===
- Eric Whelpton (North 'B' House 1909-12): Author, basis for fictional character Lord Peter Wimsey
- James Hilton (School House 1915-18): Author whose works include Goodbye, Mr. Chips and Lost Horizon
- Ralph Izzard (West House 1924-28): Journalist, author, British Naval Intelligence Officer, inspiration for the Ian Fleming novel Casino Royale and one of the inspirations for its protagonist James Bond
- Malcolm Lowry (West House, 1923–27): Author whose works include Under the Volcano.
- John Simon (critic): (School House 1938-39) Cultural critic for New York Magazine and other publications
- Sir Alastair Burnet (School House, 1942–46): Journalist and broadcaster; editor of The Economist from 1965 to 1974; long-serving ITN newscaster
- J. G. Ballard (North 'B' House, 1946–49): Author whose works include Empire of the Sun
- Christopher Hitchens (North 'B' House, 1962–66): Journalist and religious and literary critic
- Peter Hitchens (West House, 1965–67): Journalist and polemicist
- Martin Bell (East House 1952-56) British UNICEF (UNICEF UK) Ambassador, a former broadcast war reporter and former independent politician
- Jack Saunders (Moulton House 2004-06, West House 2006-11) Radio 1 DJ

=== Other ===
- Richard Heffer (West House, 1959–64), Actor.
- Michael Latimer (East House, 1955–59), Actor.
- Michael Rennie (West House, 1924–26), Actor
- Sir John Royce (West House 1958-63), British jurist
- G. David Green (North A House 1962-69)
- David Moore Crook, Spitfire pilot in the Battle of Britain and author
- Geoffrey Gaunt, Spitfire pilot in the Battle of Britain

Old Leysians have their own old boys' sports clubs including the "Old Leysian Football Club," which in its heyday (during the 1930s) was one of the leading rugby clubs in the London area. There is also an Old Leysian Golfing Society and Old Leysian Cricket Club, which plays in the Cambridgeshire league.

== Headteachers ==
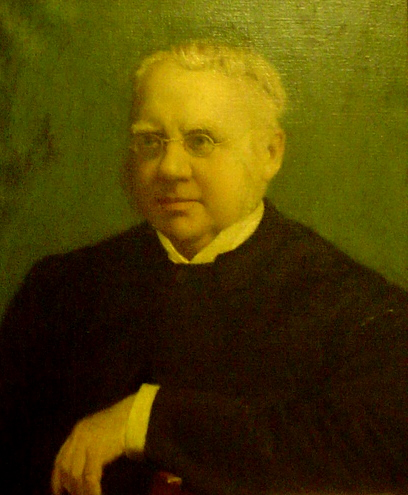
William Fiddian Moulton, the school's first headmaster, in the Memorial Chapel

- W. F. Moulton 1875–1898
- W.T.A. Barber 1898–1919
- H. Bisseker 1919–1934
- W.G. Humphrey 1934–1958
- W.A. Barker 1958–1975
- B.T. Bellis 1975–1986
- T.G. Beynon 1986–1990
- John C. A. Barrett 1990–2004
- Mark Slater 2004–2013
- Martin Priestley 2014–2025

In May 2024, the school announced the appointment of Dr Clare Ives, currently senior deputy head of Sevenoaks School, as headteacher to replace Martin Priestley on his retirement in September 2025.

== See also ==
- Memorial Chapel, The Leys School
- St Faith's School
- The Leysian Mission in London
