= Windsor Hopkin Lewis =

Wales international rugby union player

- Born: 11 November 1906 Maesteg, Wales
- Died: 30 November 1982 (aged 76) Northampton, England
- University: Pembroke College, Cambridge
- Occupation: Anaesthetist

Rugby union career
- Position: Outside-half
International career
Years	Team	Apps	(Points)
1926–28	Wales	6	(7)

Windsor Hopkin Lewis (11 November 1906 – 30 November 1982) was a Welsh international rugby union player.

== Biography ==
Lewis was born in Maesteg and attended Pembroke College, Cambridge.

An outside-half, Lewis gained rugby blues for Cambridge University, but achieved the rare distinction of attaining an international cap first. He made his Wales debut as a 19 year old against Ireland in the 1926 Five Nations and was widely acclaimed by the press as being their best performer in a 11–8 win. The following year, Lewis secured his first points through a drop goal against Ireland and scored a try against New South Wales in an end of year international. He gained his sixth and final cap during the 1928 Five Nations and retired young on account of a shoulder injury.

Lewis remained involved in rugby as a coach and long–serving president of Cambridge University RFC, which honoured his contribution by renaming their club rooms to the Windsor Room. His son Geoff, capped twice for Wales, was also a Cambridge blue.

Outside of rugby, Lewis had 30 years as a consultant anaesthetist at Addenbrooke's Hospital, before retiring in 1968.

== See also ==
- List of Wales national rugby union players
