= Paul Svehlik =

British field hockey player

Personal information
- Born: 15 April 1947 (age 79) Nigeria
- Height: 189 cm (6 ft 2 in)
- Weight: 85 kg (187 lb)

Sport
- Sport: Field hockey
Senior career
Years	Team	Caps	Goals
1966–1969	Cambridge University	-	-
1969–1975	Beckenham	-	-
National team
Years	Team	Caps	Goals
–	Great Britain	31	-
1969–1975	England	66	-

Paul Joseph Thomas Svehlik (born 15 April 1947) is a British field hockey player. He competed in the men's tournament at the 1972 Summer Olympics.

== Biography ==
Svehlik was born in Nigeria and educated at St Faith's School from 1954 to 1960 and then The Leys School in Cambridge. he then studied at Fitzwilliam College, Cambridge from 1966 to 1969.

Svehlik won three blues for the hockey team while at the University of Cambridge and captained the team in 1969, in addition to gaining his first England cap. He then played club hockey for Beckenham Hockey Club in the Men's England Hockey League.

While at Beckenham, he captained England in 1971, went to the 1972 Olympics and represented England at the 1973 Men's Hockey World Cup in Amstelveen.

He was also selected by England for the 1975 Men's Hockey World Cup in Kuala Lumpur.

After retiring from hockey he became a European Administrator of the Men's Tennis Council, a position he held until 1990. He was also the head of the boxers delegation for the International Boxing Association at the 2004 Olympics.
