= Alex Goode =

England international rugby union player

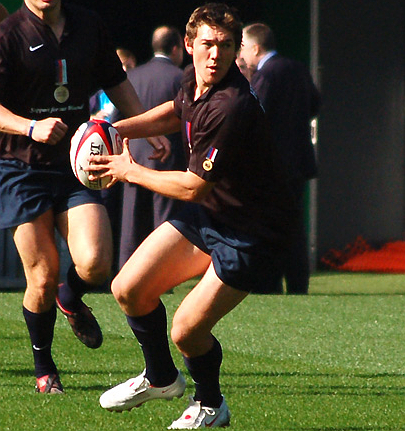
- Goode in 2008
- Born: Alexander Goode; 7 May 1988 (age 38) Cambridge, England
- Height: 1.81 m (5 ft 11 in)
- Weight: 90 kg (14 st 2 lb; 200 lb)
- School: St Faith's School; The Leys School; Oakham School
- University: University of Hertfordshire
- Notable relative: Joanne Goode (aunt)

Rugby union career
- Position(s): Fullback, Fly-half
- Current team: Saracens
Youth career
- Cambridge R.U.F.C.
Senior career
Years	Team	Apps	(Points)
2008–2025	Saracens	402	(629)
2008	London Welsh (loan)	3	(5)
2020–2021	NEC Green Rockets (loan)	7	(41)
- Correct as of 12 April 2023
International career
Years	Team	Apps	(Points)
2007	England U19	4	(31)
2008	England U20	4	(38)
2009–2011	England Saxons	6	(15)
2012–2016	England	21	(8)
- Correct as of 19 November 2016

Alexander David Goode (born 7 May 1988) is an English former professional rugby union player who played for Saracens in Premiership Rugby.

== Biography ==
All-rounder Goode appeared at the national schools athletics finals, played county tennis and was part of the Ipswich Town football academy before joining Saracens.

He is the nephew of Jo Goode, who won an Olympic bronze in Badminton in Sydney.

A fly half by trade, he moved to full back and has played the majority of his games for Saracens in these positions.

He was educated at St Faith's School, The Leys School and Oakham School, and at the University of Hertfordshire.

== Club career ==
He joined the academy structure at Saracens ahead of the 2006–2007 season, and made his club debut against Bristol. He has since signed several contract extensions. He was awarded the 2019 European Player of the Year award. During his time at Saracens he has won six Premiership titles in 2011, 2015, 2016, 2018, 2019 and 2023, with Goode featuring in all six finals and scoring a try in the 2016 final. He also helped Saracens win the European Champions Cup in 2016, 2017 and 2019, scoring a try in the 2017 final.

He spent a season on loan to Japanese side NEC Green Rockets while Saracens competed in the 2020–21 RFU Championship. After Saracens' quick return he returned to them for the following season.

He has since become the most capped Saracens player in their history - with 398 appearances for the London club, and became the first Saracens player in history to make 400 senior in season club appearances on 10th May 2025 against Newcastle Falcons.

== International career ==
Goode represented England at Under 16A and Under 18 level. Goode played at the 2007 Under 19 Rugby World Championship. In 2008 Goode was a member of the England under-20 team that won the grand slam and reached the final of the 2008 IRB Junior World Championship. In January 2009 Goode made his debut for the England Saxons, against Portugal.

On 16 June 2012 Goode made his test debut for England against South Africa, coming off the bench on 16 June 2012 in a 36–27 loss. Goode was part of the squad selected for the 2012 Autumn internationals, because of injuries to Ben Foden he started all four of the games at full back. He played well enough to earn himself QBE Man of the Match in England's 54–12 win over Fiji.

Goode also featured in the 2013 Six Nations Championship, playing all five games including the Grand Slam decider at Cardiff's Millennium Stadium. Unfortunately a shoulder injury and subsequent reconstructive surgery sidelined him for England's summer tour to Argentina.

=== International tries ===
As of 7 July 2019

Try	Opposing team	Location	Venue	Competition	Date	Result	Score
1	Fiji	London, England	Twickenham Stadium	2016 Autumn Internationals	19 November 2016	Win	58 – 15
