= Tupou College =

Tupou College Toloa
- Kolisi Ko Tupou
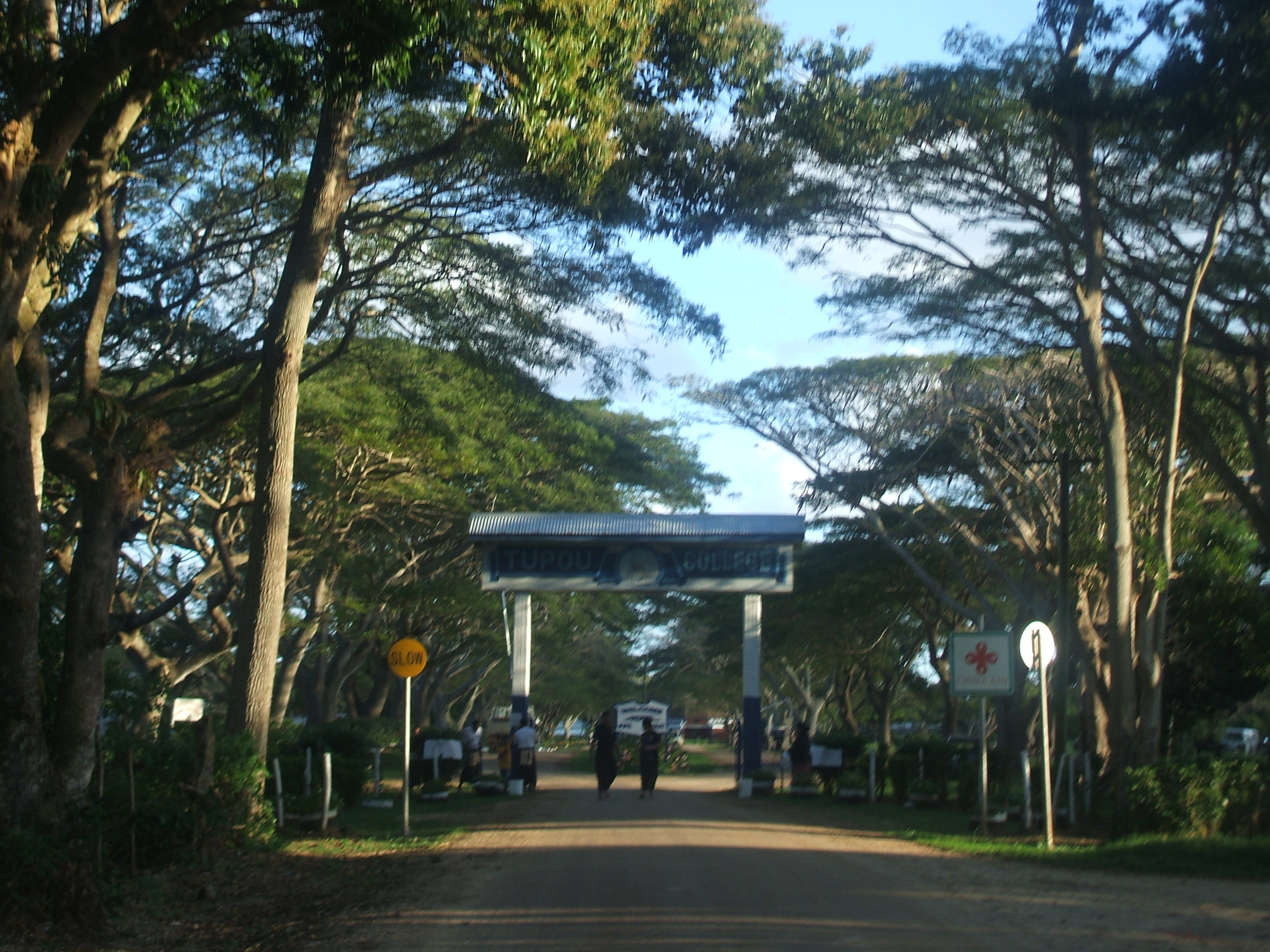
- Entrance gate to Tupou College

Location
- Toloa; Tongatapu; P.O. Box 4 Tonga
- Coordinates: 21°13′40″S 175°9′41″W

Information
- Type: Private school
- Motto: Tongan: "Ko Tonga Mo'unga Ki He Loto" ("A Tongan's Mountain Is His Heart")
- Denomination: Free Wesleyan Church of Tonga
- Established: 1866
- Founder: Rev. Dr. James Egan Moulton
- Principal: Rev. 'Alifeleti 'Atiola
- Head of school: Rev. Alafua Fisi'ihoi
- Gender: Male
- Age: 11 to 18+
- Enrollment: 1000+ (2021)
- Average class size: 25
- Language: Tongan, English
- Hours in school day: 7
- Classrooms: 21
- Colours: Blue, White and Black
- Nickname: Tongan: "Vaotā Koula" ("The Golden Forest"); T.C.T.
- Website: www.tupou.to

Tupou College is a Methodist boys secondary boarding school in Toloa on the island of Tongatapu, Tonga. It is located on the Eastern District of Tongatapu near the village of Malapo. The school is owned by the Free Wesleyan Church of Tonga. Established in 1866 by James Egan Moulton, it claims to be the oldest secondary school in the Pacific Islands. Enrolment is some 1,000 pupils. Tupou College was first established at Nuku'alofa at the location on which Queen Salote College stands today. From there it moved to Nafualu, Sia'atoutai on the site where Sia’atoutai Theological College now stands. In 1948, the school last moved to Toloa in the Eastern District of Tongatapu where it still stands today.

Tupou College's brother school is Newington College, located in Sydney, Australia. Rev Moulton was the founding headmaster of both Newington College and Tupou College.

Missionary A. Harold Wood was Principal from 1924 to 1937, during which time the school expanded from 30 students to almost 400. The first Tongan principal of the school was Rev. Sione Siupeli Taiamoni Taliai who was principal from 1970–1979.

The College has a 750-acre (3.0 km^{2}) campus, on which crops of vegetables and fruit are grown. This includes an area of forest noted in Tonga as the Toloa Rainforest Reserve containing a variety of plant species endemic to Tonga as well as those no longer found in other parts of the kingdom. The forest is far smaller in size today then when they first moved there because of the construction of the airport, University of the Nations at Lafalafa and clearance for extra farmland. Tree planting projects have been carried out in the previous years within the forest to ensure the survival and continuous growth of the unique species found at Toloa.

== Notable alumni ==
- Taufa'ahau Tupou IV (1918-2006), the late King of Tonga, reigning from 1967–2006
- Viliami Tangi, former Deputy Prime Minister and Health Minister
- Viliami Ofahengaue (b. 1968), professional Australian rugby union player
- Saimone Taumoepeau (b. 1979), professional New Zealand rugby union player
- Sione Lātūkefu (1927 - 1995), historian

== Education ==
The school trains students in Christian discipleship through programs of worship, study, work and recreation. They stay within the campus from Saturdays to Fridays. All students are required to stay within the campus; the only exception being those possessing medical problems and difficulties.

School grades are from forms 1-7 (Year 7-13) including two technical classes where students learn engineering, motor repair, carpentry, metalwork, electrical engineering and art & design.

Students are also required to make some from a variety of Tongan Handicrafts including: polished coconut shells (for kava drinking) and kafa (waist ropes to hold ta'ovala). It is from this that students learn the art, traditional skills, and culture of Tonga also benefiting the school as it is sold in the college's annual bazaar.

=== Curriculum ===
As most schools in Tonga do, Tupou College follows the curriculum of the Tongan Ministry of Education which is based on the New Zealand Curriculum. Technical classes also offer courses where students can continue studies in New Zealand.

== Magazine ==
Tupou College has a magazine published annually to record events and participation in the school. It is known as the Ko e Havea Magazine.

== Principals ==
Before 1970, all of Tupou College's principals were Australian and were assigned to work in Tonga as missionaries. It was only in 1970 that Tupou College received its first Tongan principal, Rev. Siupeli T. Taliai, who served as principal for nine years; from 1970–1979.

Principal	Years
Rev. Dr. James Egan Moulton	1866-1888
Rev. James Egan Moulton Jnr	1895-1905
Rev. Charles P. Walkden Brown	1906-1908
Rev. Rodger Page	1909-1915
Rev. Dr. E. E. V. Collocott	1916-1923
Rev. Dr. Alfred Harold Wood	1924-1937
Rev. Cecil Gribble	1939-1943
Rev. Eban .E.V. Newman	1944-1947
Rev. Ronald A.W. Woodgate	1948-1951
Rev. Howard W. Secomb	1951-1963
Rev. John Sutton	1964-1967
Rev. Siupeli T. Taliai	1970-1979
Rev. Dr. Tevita Tongamohenoa Puloka	1980-1984
Rev. David Mills	1985-1989
Rev. Sione Hikaione Fonua	1990-1994
Rev. Dr. 'Asinate Samate	1995
Rev. Siosaia Pele	1996-1997
Rev. Dr. Tevita Hala Palefau	1998-2001
Rev. Dr. 'Asinate Samate	2002-2003
Rev. Tu'ipulotu Malakai Pomana	2003-2004
Rev. Dr. Fisi'ihoi Mone	2005-2013
Rev. 'Alifeleti 'Atiola	2014-2025
Rev. Samiuela Fonua	2025-

== House system ==
The school has 12 houses. They are:

1. John Thomas (first successful missionary in Tonga)
2. Harold Wood (after Rev. A. Harold Wood- former principal of the school)
3. Tevita Tonga (after Tevita Tonga Mohenoa - first dux and head tutor of the school)
4. 'Aho'eitu (after Siaosi Manumataongo 'Alaivahamama'o 'Aho'eitu Konstantin Tuku'aho - an ex-student)
5. Siupeli Taliai (first Tongan Principal)
6. Kau Ta'e'iloa (to all unknown contributors to the School)
7. Howard Secomb (former principal of Tupou College)
8. Sau Faupula (former head tutor)
9. John Wesley (after John Wesley - founder of the Methodist Church)
10. Ronald Woodgate (after Ronald Woodgate - former principal of school-1948)
11. Rodger Page (after Rodger Page - former principal and former president of the FWCT)
12. Sione Havea (longest head tutor)

== Museum ==
Tukuʻaho Memorial Museum (Ko e Misiume Fakamanatu ʻO Tukuʻaho) is a small museum in the campus which houses many important Tongan artifacts given to the museum by the Tongan royal family and by many others that exhibit the school's history as well as Tongan culture. Admission is free and visitors may contact the school to visit as the museum is only open by appointment.
