= Denys Witherington =

English cricketer and British Army soldier

Personal information
- Full name: Denys March Witherington
- Born: 25 July 1921; Hendon, County Durham, England
- Died: 16 February 1944 (aged 22) near Anzio, Lazio, Italy
- Batting: Right-handed
- Role: Wicket-keeper

Domestic team information
- Years: Team
- 1939: Cambridge University

Career statistics
Competition	First-class
Matches	4
Runs scored	147
Batting average	29.40
100s/50s	–/1
Top score	52*
Catches/stumpings	5/1
- Source: Cricinfo, 8 September 2020

Denys March Witherington (25 July 1921 – 16 February 1944) was an English first-class cricketer and British Army soldier.

Witherington was born at Hendon in Sunderland in July 1921, one of three sons of Arthur Simpson and Catherine Witherington. He was educated in Cambridge at The Leys School, where he was a talented schoolboy cricketer who played in the Public School's match at Lord's. After completing his education, Witherington remained in Cambridge where he attended Emmanuel College at the University of Cambridge. While studying at Cambridge, he played first-class cricket for Cambridge University in 1939, making four appearances. Playing as a wicket-keeper, he scored 147 runs in his four matches at an average of 29.40 and a high score of 52 not out. Behind the stumps he also took five catches and made a single stumping. After missing out on a blue in 1939, his studies were interrupted by the onset of the Second World War.

During the war he served as a private with the North Lancashire Loyal Regiment, serving in the North African campaign and later the Italian campaign, where he was killed in action during a German counterattack in the Battle of Anzio in February 1944. His brother, John, had been killed two years previously when his bomber was shot down over Germany.
