= Memorial Chapel, The Leys School =

Coordinates: 52.1968°N 0.1214°E

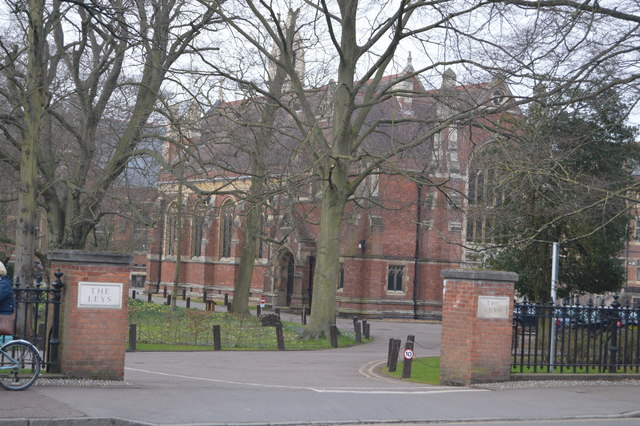
the chapel from Trumpington Road

The Memorial Chapel of The Leys is situated on the grounds of The Leys School, Cambridge, England. It was built as a memorial to the first headmaster of The Leys, William Fiddian Moulton. Plans for the chapel, designed by architect Robert Curwen, were first presented to the school's second headmaster, W. T. A. Barber; he deemed the project an unnecessary luxury. School services continued to be held instead in the school hall, until 1904 when the school governors approved the chapel's construction. The cost, including all furnishings, was estimated in 1925 to have been £39,000.

The foundation stone was laid at the marble West Door by Princess Helena of Waldeck and Pyrmont on 8 June 1905 and the chapel was consecrated on 27 October 1906. The building's design is Gothic Revival, to complement the surrounding buildings. All visible woodwork is in oak. The roof comprises elaborately worked trestles and tracery, somewhat after the lines of the famous roof of Westminster Hall. The floor is of alternating black and white marble. The chapel was designed to seat 350 boys, with the west balcony reserved for household staff.

== Memorials ==
In 1914, 927 Leysians joined the armed services and 146 of them died in the First World War. A memorial to the old Leysians who died, costing £48,000 and funded by donation, was on 6 June 1920 unveiled by the Duke of York, later King George VI. The memorial consists of four rows of names divided in the middle by a statue of an armoured St George, below which is written "To The Immortal Memory of Old Leysians Who Fell In The War Of 1914–1919", and in large block capitals the words "My Marks And Scars With Me To Be A Witness For Me That I Have Fought His Battles Who Now Will Be My Reward."

== Stained glass ==
The chapel has fourteen windows; the Governors commissioned H. J. Salisbury to decorate them all according to a unified theme. The work was modelled on the windows of the King's College Chapel, Cambridge. Because The Leys is a Methodist school, the work was required to be simple and avoid complex symbolism.

All but one of the windows depicts passages from the New Testament concerning the story of Christ; the large window over the main entrance instead shows ten Old Testament subjects forecasting the coming of the Messiah.

== Pulpit ==
The pulpit is made of oak and has a brass inscription reading "To the Glory of God and for the Preaching of His holy word this Pulpit was carved by Anne Hobson, Helen Mary Chubb, and George Hayter Chubb, and presented by the latter to The Leys, October, 1906."

== Benches ==
There are thirty-two oak benches in the chapel, thirty with square ends and two with sloping ends.
