= Trumpington Road =

Arterial road in Cambridge, UK

Coordinates: 52°11′19″N 0°07′18″E

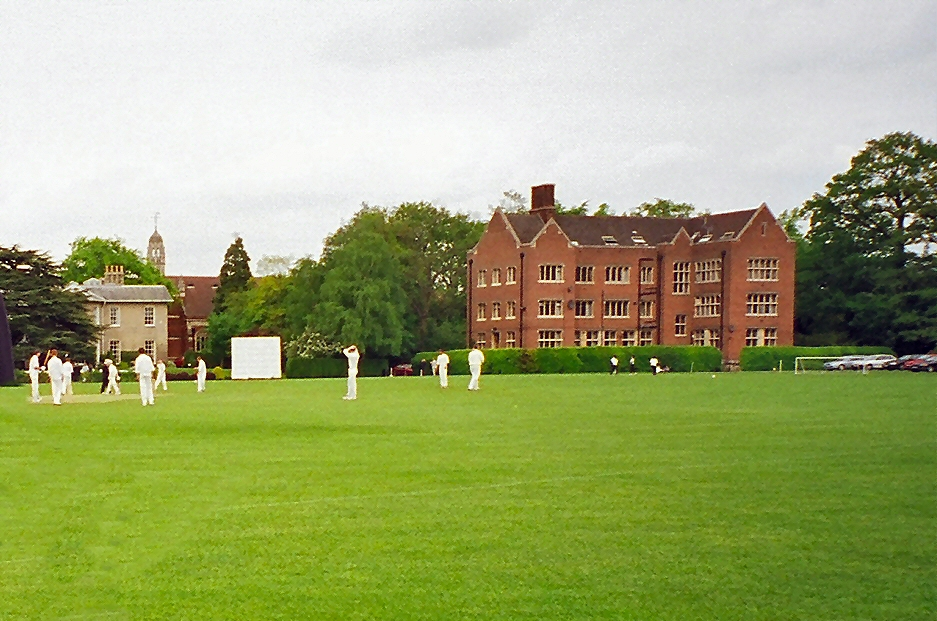
The Leys School, west of the Trumpington Road.

Trumpington Road is an arterial road (part of the A1134) in southeast central Cambridge, England. It runs between the junction of Trumpington Street and Lensfield Road at the northern end to the junction of the High Street in the village of Trumpington (the A1309) and Long Road at the southern end. The Fen Causeway leads off to the west near the northern end, over Coe Fen and the River Cam.

There are several schools on Trumpington Road:

- The Leys School
- Mander Portman Woodward VI Form College
- The Perse Preparatory School
- St Faith's School

The Cambridge University Botanic Garden is to the east of Trumpington Road.

== Hobson's Conduit ==
Hobson's Conduit runs along the northern part of Trumpington Road. This used to be an important water supply for Cambridge. A major fire in 1849 meant that a new fountain for the Market Place branch of Hobson's Conduit was erected in 1855. The previous structure was moved to the corner of Trumpington Road and Lensfield Road in 1856 as a monument to Thomas Hobson.

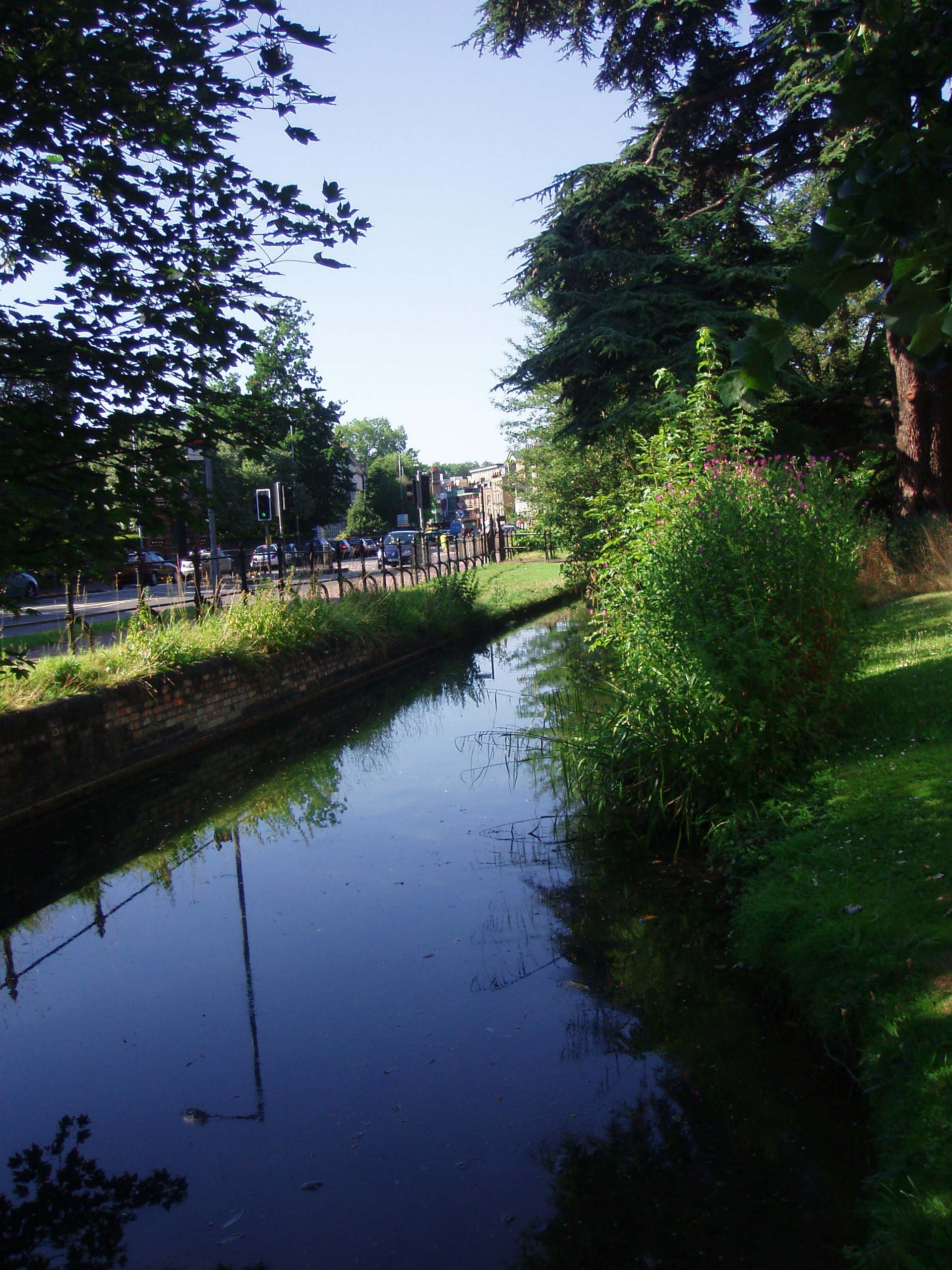
Hobson's Conduit as it runs along the side of Trumpington Road.

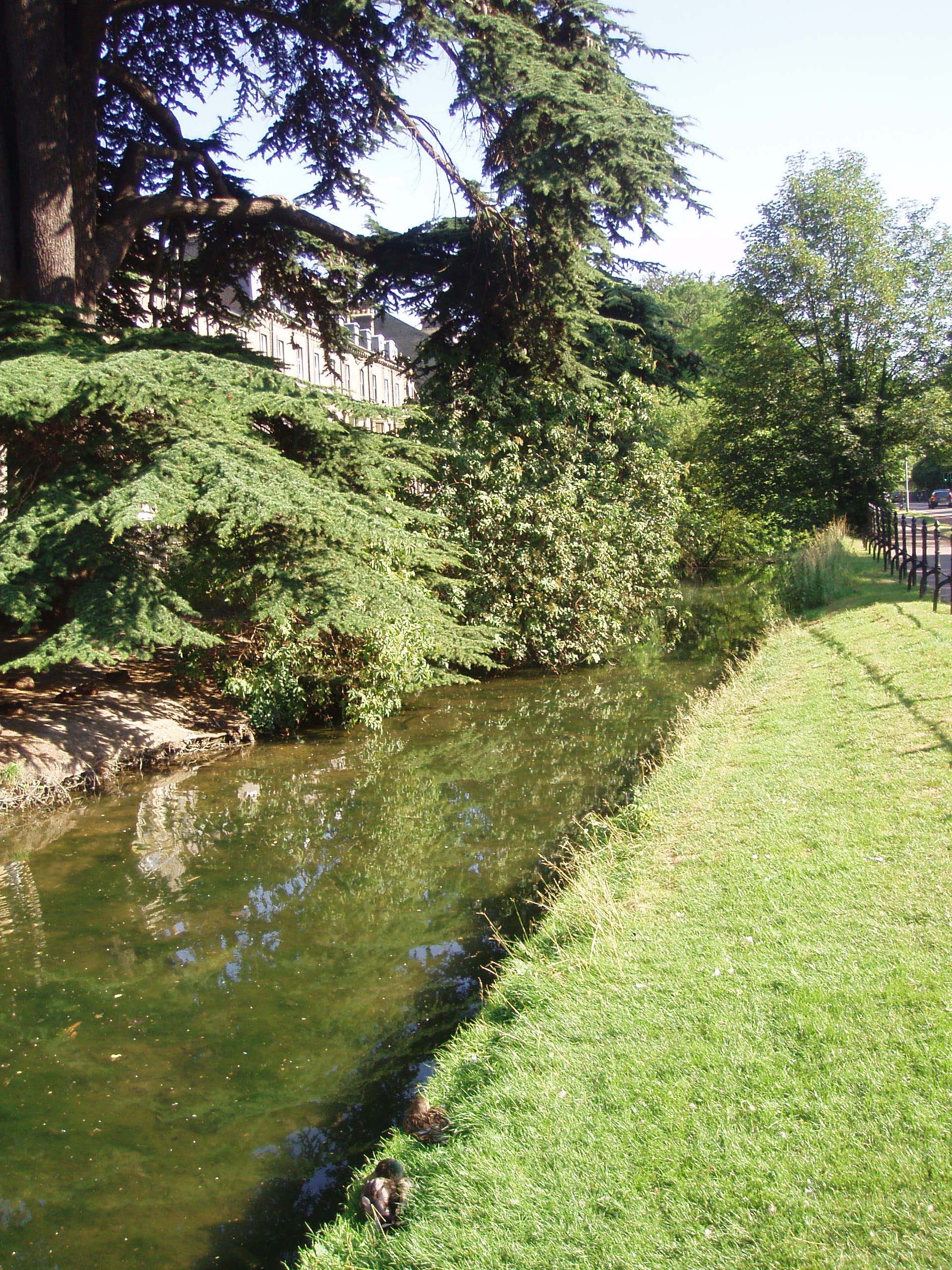
Hobson's Conduit on Brookside, next to Trumpington Road.

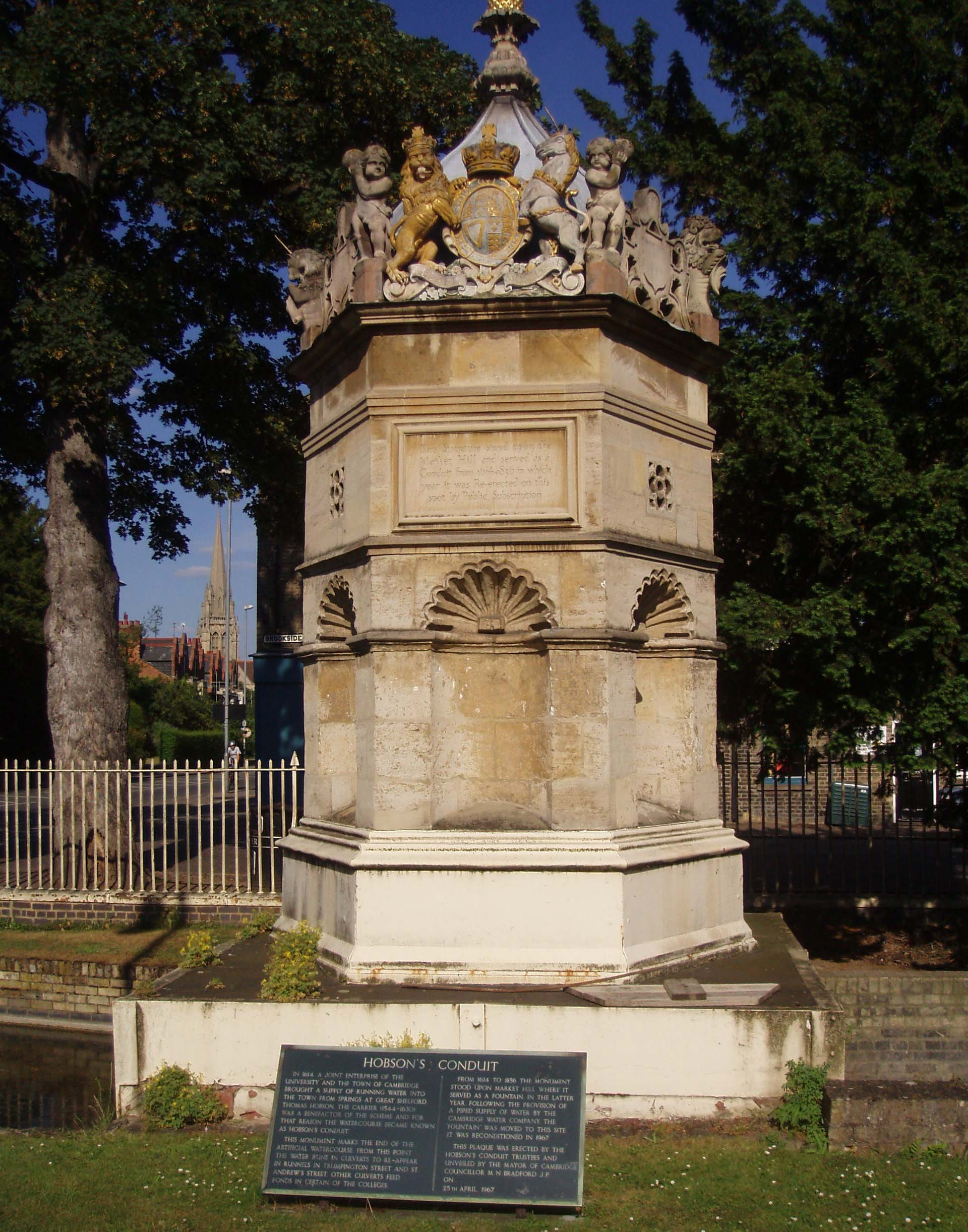
Monument to Thomas Hobson, at the northern end of Trumpington Road.
