= Geoff Windsor-Lewis =

Wales international rugby union player

- Full name: Geoffrey Windsor-Lewis
- Born: 7 April 1936 (age 90) Cambridge, England
- School: The Leys School
- University: University of Cambridge

Rugby union career
- Position: Centre
International career
Years	Team	Apps	(Points)
1960	Wales	2	(0)

Geoffrey Windsor-Lewis (born 7 April 1936) is a Welsh former international rugby union player.

Born in Cambridge, England, Windsor-Lewis is the son of 1920s Wales fly-half Windsor Hopkin Lewis, who was a Cambridge University RUFC secretary and former blue.

Windsor-Lewis won two Cambridge blues and captained the team to victory in the 1958 Varsity match.

A Richmond player, Windsor-Lewis was capped twice by Wales in the 1960 Five Nations Championship, as a centre in matches against England at Twickenham and Scotland at home.

Windsor-Lewis toured with the Barbarians both as a player and assistant team manager. He was a long-time Barbarians honorary secretary and in 2010 was appointed vice-president.

== See also ==
- List of Wales national rugby union players
