= John Saltmarsh (historian) =

British historian (1908–1974)

Dr John Saltmarsh (7 May 1908 – 25 September 1974) was a historian and Fellow of King's College, Cambridge.

The son of Winnifred and H. A. Saltmarsh, he grew up at Oakington, near Cambridge, where his father farmed four hundred acres.

== Education ==
He was born in Cambridge, England and educated at St Faith's School, Gresham's School, Holt, Norfolk, and won a scholarship to King's College, Cambridge at the age of seventeen. He gained a First in History.

== Career ==
Saltmarsh was elected as a Fellow of King's at twenty-two. He became a full lecturer at Cambridge University in 1937 and was appointed college librarian.

At the start of the Second World War, he was recruited to work at Bletchley Park, but after the war he returned to King's. In the following years, he lectured in Economic History for the University and published several works. His history of King's College itself forms part of the Victoria County History of Cambridgeshire, while his book Plague and Economic Decline in the Later Middle Ages was influential.

One of Saltmarsh's special interests was in the history of the college chapel. He used regularly to conduct parties around it, and tell stories of specific discoveries he had made - including some about the remains of bones from the meals that masons working on the chapel had brought along with them, several hundred years earlier. Some of these finds were made after he had flown over Cambridge, after World War II, in RAF aircraft, and examined detailed photographs made from such flights.

Saltmarsh retired from college teaching in 1971, fell seriously ill in 1972, and died on 25 September 1974 at sixty-six. He was unmarried and had spent most of his life in the same rooms at King's, where he was looked on as an eccentric bachelor don. His set of rooms was much envied, and after his death to avoid deciding who should have them the College Council made them into common rooms, now called the Saltmarsh Suite (dining room and reception room) in his memory.
