= Memorial Chapel, Niš =

Memorial Chapel in Niš, Serbia

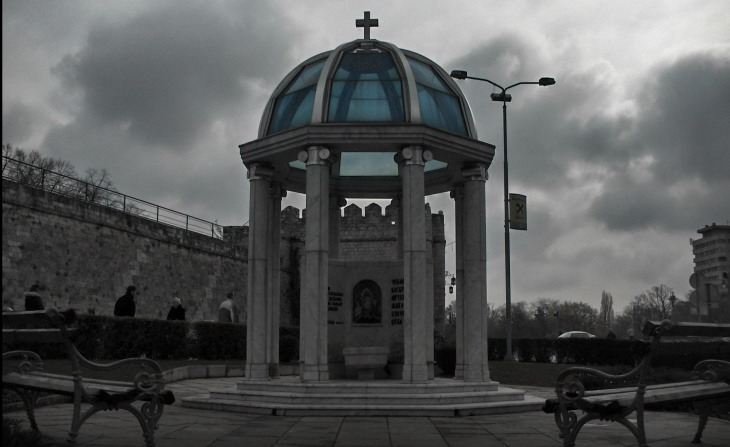
Memorial Chapel

Memorial Chapel (Serbian: Спомен капела) was built in memory of the 1999 NATO bombing of the Federal Republic of Yugoslavia victims from the city of Niš. The chapel was built by the City government of Niš, and it is situated on Sumatovacka Street near Niš Fortress and Banovina palace, currently seat of the University of Niš.
