= John Egan Moulton =

Australian medical practitioner

John Egan Moulton (2 September 1930 – 21 September 2012) was an Australian medical practitioner. He was Chairman of the NSW Institute of Sports Medicine at Concord Hospital, team doctor of the Australian national rugby union team and Honorary Secretary of the Council of Newington College. He was a Fellow of the Royal College of Surgeons of England and Edinburgh and a Fellow of the Royal Australasian College of Surgeons. Moulton was honoured by his nation with the award of the Medal of the Order of Australia for his "service to surgery and medical education particularly in relation to sports medicine."

== Early life ==
Moulton was the son of Kirton Bakewell Moulton and was born in Molong, New South Wales. His early education was in Broken Hill before attending Newington College in 1949. Upon matriculation he went to the University of Sydney and graduated as a Bachelor of Medicine and Surgery in 1954 He was a resident of Wesley College.

== Medical career ==
Moulton was in practice as a general surgeon in Auburn, New South Wales. He was a post-graduate teacher of surgical trainees at Concord and Auburn Hospital. On its establishment in 1994, Moulton was appointed chairman of the NSW Institute of Sports Medicine, a specialist public health facility providing assessment and treatment of sports injuries and a range of sports medicine related services.

== Rugby union ==
From 1986 until 1992, Moulton was the medical advisor of the Australian Rugby Union and team doctor of the Wallabies – a period encompassing the 1986 Bledisloe Cup win in New Zealand, the inaugural Rugby World Cup in 1987 and Australia's maiden Rugby World Cup win in 1991. Moulton was a co-author of Guardians of the Game – The History of the New South Wales Rugby Union 1874–2004, published in 2005 by ABC Books and the New South Wales Rugby Union.

== Newington College Council ==
In 1994, Moulton was elected by the Synod of New South Wales of the Uniting Church in Australia to the Council of Newington College and in 1998 he became Honorary Secretary of that body.

== See also ==
- James Egan Moulton Jnr, grandfather
- James Egan Moulton, great-grandfather
