= James Egan Moulton =

English-born Australian Methodist minister and headmaster

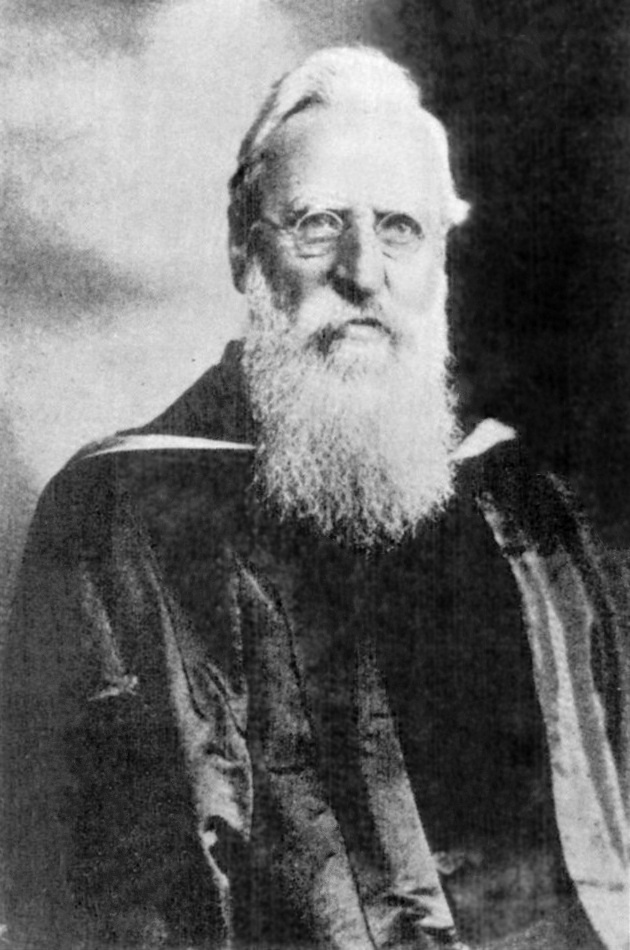
James Egan Moulton

James Egan Moulton (4 January 1841 – 9 May 1909) was an English-born Australian Methodist minister and headmaster and school president.

== Early life ==
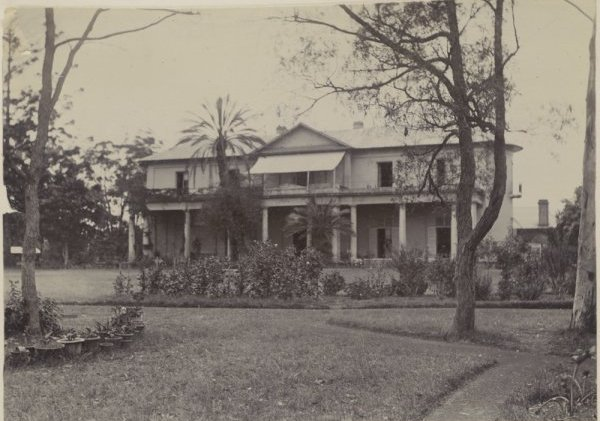
Newington House, Silverwater, where Moulton was the founding headmaster

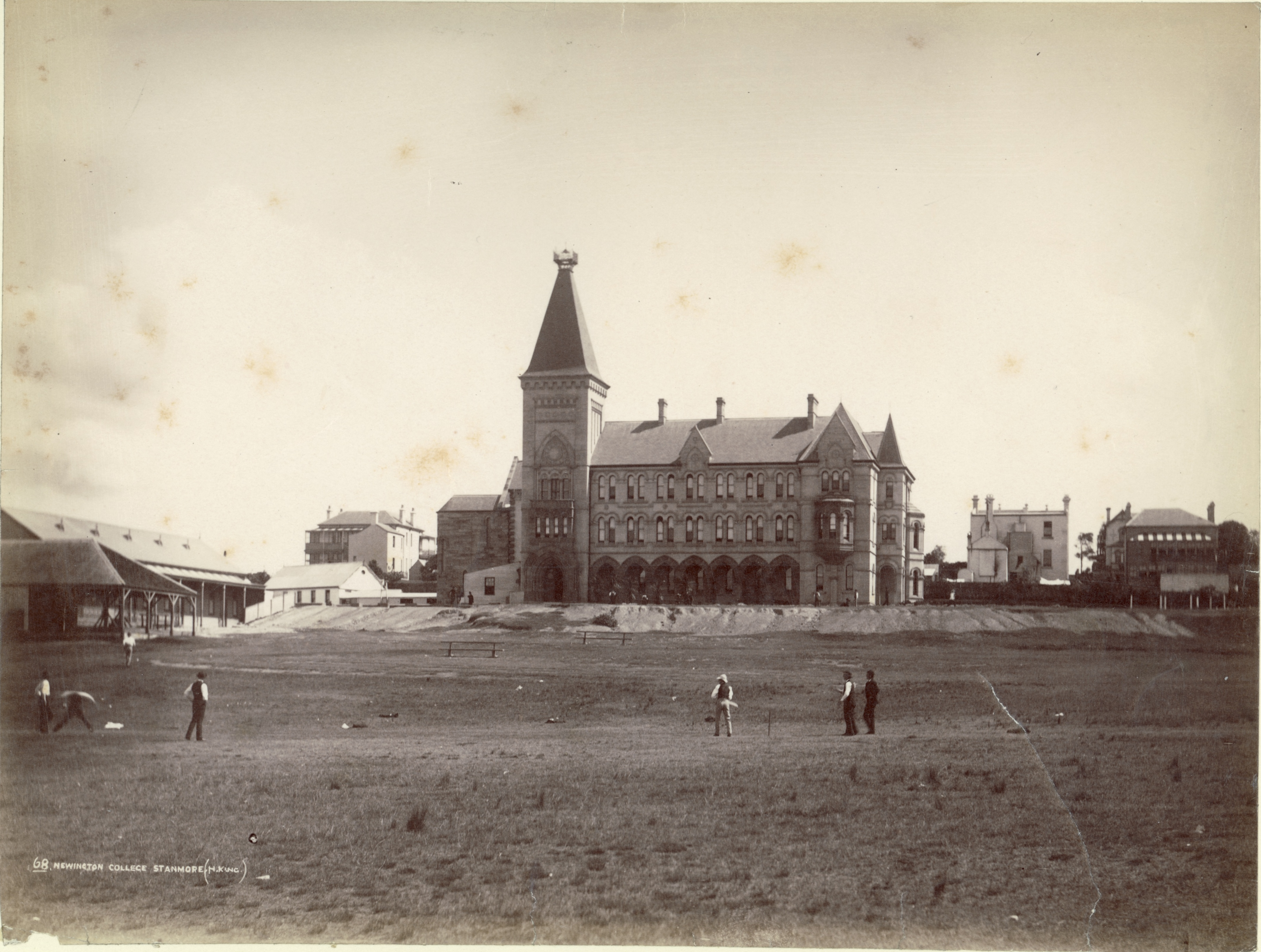
Newington College, Stanmore, where Moulton was president

Moulton was born in North Shields, Northumberland. Many members of his family were Methodist ministers and he attended the Wesleyan school Kingswood in Bath. In 1863 he was the founding headmaster of Newington College while in Australia awaiting a posting to Tonga.

On 23 December 1864, he married Emma Knight. They had three sons and three daughters together.

== Tongan ministry ==
In Tonga he presided over the Methodist church and established Tupou College, patronised by King George Tupou I. During his time in Tonga, a schism formed within the church leading to the creation of the Free Church of Tonga. Throughout the dispute, Moulton managed to stay on good terms with the new movement. He translated several texts into Tongan, including Milton's Paradise Lost.

== Australian ministry ==
Moulton returned to Sydney in 1893 and took up the presidency of Newington College. In 1895, Moulton was the inaugural President of the Old Newingtonians' Union. During this time, he completed translating the Bible into Tongan, which is still in use today in Tonga. In 1896 the first Tongan students arrived at Newington. They appear in admission records with anglicised names as Moulton Finau, Saul Funaki, Tonga Latu, Charles Liu, John Otuhoume, Egan Tatafu and Tugi William Tuboulaki. The initial seven arrived at the beginning of the school year with Solo Ula arriving some time between April and June of that year.

== Death ==
Moulton died, aged sixty-eight, in Lindfield, New South Wales and is buried in Gore Hill Cemetery.

== See also ==
- James Egan Moulton Jnr, son
- John Fletcher Moulton, brother
- Richard Green Moulton, brother
- William Fiddian Moulton, brother
- James Hope Moulton, nephew
- John Egan Moulton, great-grandson
- Bible translations into Oceanic languages

== Bibliography ==
- D. S. Macmillan, Newington College 1863-1963 (Syd, 1963)
- P. L. Swain, Newington Across the Years 1863-1998 (Syd, 1999)

Educational offices
Preceded by Inaugural	Headmaster; Newington College; 1863	Succeeded by Thomas Johnston
Preceded by Rev William Kelynack	President; Newington College; 1891—1900	Succeeded by Rev Dr Charles Prescott
Preceded by Inaugural	Principal; Tupou College; 1866—1888	Succeeded by James Egan Moulton Jnr
