= Frank Surman =

- Born: Francis John Surman; 1865 or 1866
- Died: 3 June 1925 (aged 59) Rockdale, New South Wales, Australia
- Occupation: Master butcher

Rugby union career
- Position: Utility back
Provincial / State sides
Years	Team	Apps	(Points)
1889	Canterbury	2	(0)
1892–94	New South Wales	16	(12)
1895–96	Auckland	4	(0)
International career
Years	Team	Apps	(Points)
1896	New Zealand	0	(0)

Francis John "Frank" Surman (1865 or 1866 – 3 June 1925) was a New Zealand rugby union player and professional athlete. He represented the New Zealand national rugby team in 1896. A utility back, he played at any position in the backline from halfback to the three-quarter line.

== Early life ==
Surman is listed in some publications as having been born and raised in Thames but this is far from certain.

== Rugby union ==
Surman holds the distinction of being one of the first players to play top-level rugby in both New Zealand and Australia.

He played in two matches for Canterbury in New Zealand in 1889, before moving to Sydney where he played for the Randwick club and New South Wales between 1892 and 1894. In 1893 Surman played for New South Wales against the touring New Zealand side. The next season, he was one of six New Zealand-born players in the New South Wales side that toured New Zealand. He played in 10 of the 12 matches on that tour, four of which were at halfback, five on the wing and one at centre. In his 16 matches for New South Wales Surman scored four tries.

Surman returned to New Zealand and in 1895 and 1896 he played four matches for Auckland. His sole appearance for the New Zealand national team was at centre against Queensland at Athletic Park in 1896. Unfortunately he was injured and left the field in the second half of that game when he tripped over the wire keeping spectators out of the field of play.

Surman returned to Sydney and played for Randwick in 1898 and 1899. In 1900 he played on the wing for Eastern Suburbs in Sydney. In 1908 Surman was reported to have joined the St George rugby club in Sydney.

== Athletics ==
Surman ran as a professional athlete in Australia. His most notable victory was the 30th Botany Grand Handicap in Sydney in 1892, in which he won a purse of £100.

== Later life ==
Surman married Emma Jane Edmonson (née Atkins), a widow, in Sydney in 1908. He worked as a master butcher in the Sydney suburb of Rockdale.

Surman died aged 59 at his home in Rockdale on 3 June 1925, and was buried at Woronora Cemetery.
