= James Hope Moulton =

British missionary

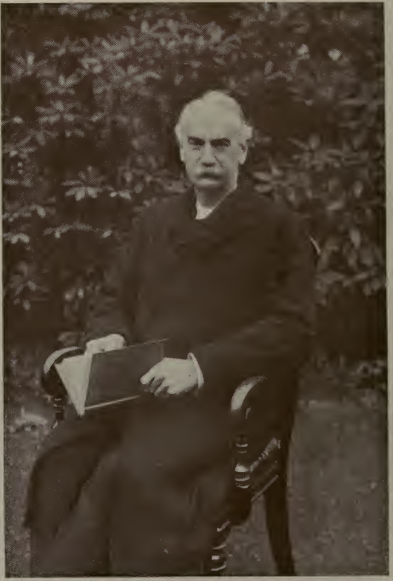
- Born: October 11, 1863; Cambridge, England
- Died: April 9, 1917 (aged 53); At sea
- Occupation: Philologist
- Known for: Studies on Zoroastrianism
- Spouse: Eliza Osborn
- Children: William, Edith, Harold, and Helen
- Father: William Fiddian Moulton

The Reverend James Hope Moulton (11 October 1863 – 9 April 1917) was a British non-conformist divine. He was also a philologist and made a special study of Zoroastrianism.

James Hope Moulton Signature

== Biography ==
His family had a strong Methodist background. His father was the first headmaster of the Leys School, Cambridge where James was one of the first students. After attending King's College, Cambridge, he chose to become a Wesleyan minister. He showed a strong talent for academic studies, and the University of Manchester invited him to teach Classical Greek and other languages. He was also teaching at the Didsbury College, a Methodist seminary near Manchester. He was a friend of James Frazer, the Scottish social anthropologist. He developed a strong interest in Zoroastrianism, one of the world's oldest known monotheistic religions. Over the course of his life he published many books and papers, mainly focused on Zoroastrianism and the Greek texts that the Bible is derived from. He was a prison chaplain at Preston for some time around 1910.

In 1915 he decided to take advantage of the academic lull of World War I and spend a long spell in India, to serve as a Methodist missionary and to research and lecture on Zoroastrianism where it is still practiced by certain groups. This was not an easy time for him, as his wife had recently died, and while he was in India, his son William Ralph Osborn Moulton died in the French trenches serving with the army on 5 August 1916. He spent 16 months in India under the auspices of the YMCA, researching, preaching and lecturing. A matter that was of particular interest to him was the religion of the Parsis, the Zoroastrians of the Indian subcontinent, and the relationship between their beliefs and Judeo-Christian religions. He felt that the former was awaiting its completion by the latter. While in Karachi, he availed of the friendship and library of Maneckji Nusserwanji Dhalla, a U.S.-educated Zoroastrian scholar and the high priest of the Parsi community there.

He left Karachi aboard the S.S. City of Paris, headed for Egypt where he met with his friend and colleague Dr J. Rendel Harris. The pair set sail from Port Said but as their ship passed the Gulf of Lion it was torpedoed and sunk by a German submarine. Moulton, Harris and several others from the ship escaped in a lifeboat, but James Moulton died on the third of the four days it took the boat to reach Corsica, aged fifty-three. He was buried at sea on 9 April 1917.

Almost 3 years previously he opened up his book From Egyptian Rubbish Heaps with this paragraph "On July 31, 1914, the ill-fated Lusitania landed at New York after what proved her last peace voyage. A week later two of her passengers proceeded to the Conference at Northfield, where some two thousand Christian people were gathered in sight of the grave of D. L. Moody. It was very hard for us all, doubly hard for Britons, to detach our thoughts even partially from the horrors that were already beginning—horrors which will long make it impossible to name even the best of Germans without a sharp stab of pain. But we were studying the only Book that can ever bring peace and comfort to men in their direst need, and there is no fear that those who know will think we were 'fiddling while Rome burned.'" He had been aboard the ship on its last voyage just as World War I began. It was sunk less than 11 months later, killing everyone on board.

== Academic positions ==
- Tutor at Didsbury College
- Fellow of King's College, Cambridge
- Greenwood Professor of Hellenistic Greek and Indo-European Philology at Manchester University, 1908-17
- Doctor of Letters (D. Litt.), University of London, 19 December 1901

== Works ==
- Grammar of New Testament Greek Vol. I - Prolegomena (1906)
- William F. Moulton a memoir, written with his brother, who had the same name as their father, William Fiddian Moulton
- The Papers of Oscar Browning, written with his father, William Fiddian Moulton
- Early Religious Poetry of Persia
- Early Religious Poetry of Persia (1911}
- From Egyptian Rubbish Heaps (1916); second edition 1917
- Early Zoroastrianism
- Fire Temples and Towers of Silence
- Parsi Piety
- The Crown of Zoroastrianism
- The Parsis
- The Parsis and Christian Propaganda
- The Teaching of Zarathushtra
- Treasure of the Magi: a study of modern Zoroastrianism
- Zarathustra and the Outside World
- Zoroastrianism
- An Introduction to the Study of New Testament Greek (1895)
- Two Lectures on the Science of Language (1903)
- The Christian Religion in the Study and the Street (1919)
- A Neglected Sacrament and Other Sermons and Addresses (1919)

== See also ==
- William Fiddian Moulton, father
- John Fletcher Moulton, uncle
- Richard Green Moulton, uncle
- James Egan Moulton, uncle
- George Milligan, co-author of Vocabulary of the Greek Testament.
