= William Fiddian Moulton =

English Methodist minister, biblical scholar and educator

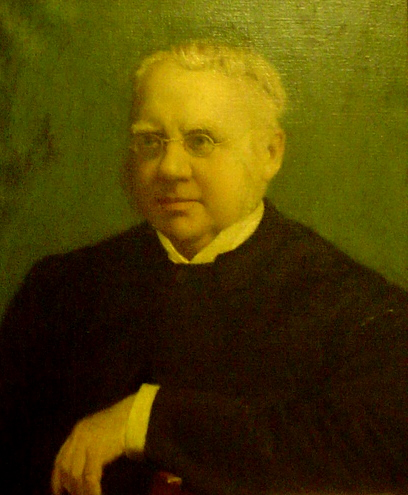
- Portrait of Moulton in the Memorial Chapel, The Leys School, Cambridge

President of the Methodist Conference
- In office 1890–1891
- Preceded by: Charles Henry Kelly
- Succeeded by: Thomas Bowman Stephenson

Personal details
- Born: 14 March 1835
- Died: 5 February 1898 (aged 62)
- Spouse: Hannah Hope
- Children: James Hope Moulton and William Fiddian Moulton
- Occupation: Wesleyan Methodist minister

William Fiddian Moulton (14 March 1835 – 5 February 1898) was an English Methodist minister, biblical scholar and educator.

== Biography ==
William's father, James Egan Moulton, was a Wesleyan Methodist minister. William had at least three brothers, and two unmarried sisters. Like his father and grandfather, William became a Wesleyan minister and in 1875 the first headmaster of The Leys School, Cambridge. He remained headmaster for the rest of his life; one of the school's houses is named after him.

He was elected President of the Methodist Conference at Bristol in 1890.

On a stormy afternoon in 1898, he was on his way to visit a sick parishioner when he suffered a heart attack in the grounds of the school. A gardener found him and brought him back to his house, where he died soon after, aged sixty-two. He was interred in Histon Road Cemetery, Cambridge, and has a memorial in Wesley's Chapel, London. The Memorial Chapel, The Leys School was built as a memorial to him; the chapel was consecrated on 27 October 1906.

In his biography, his sons William and James noted that "So genuine was his sense of unworthiness that praise became to him positive pain. He would walk out of the room rather than hear a laudatory passage about himself."

== Works ==
He wrote a concordance of the Greek New Testament, and some titles with his son James. He sat on various inter-denominational committees concerned with translations of the New Testament.

Selected writings

- The History of the English Bible (1st ed.). 1878. Moulton, William Fiddian (1882). 2nd edition, revised. Moulton, William Fiddian (1911). 5th edition, revised & enlarged by the sons of Rev. W. F. Moulton.
- A Treatise on the Grammar of New Testament Greek by G. B. Winer, translated from the German.
- Concordance to the Greek Testament, with Alfred Shenington Geden , (subsequently revised by his grandson Harold Keeling Moulton, ISBN 0 567 08571 6)
- The Story of the Manchester Mission
- The Old World and the New Faith, Notes Upon the Historical Narrative Contained in the Acts of the Apostles

Biography

- William F. Moulton, a memoir written by his two sons, William Fiddian Moulton Jr. and James Hope Moulton.

== See also ==
- John Fletcher Moulton, brother
- Richard Green Moulton, brother
- James Egan Moulton, brother
- James Hope Moulton, son

== Sources ==
- Norgate, Gerald le Grys (1901). "Moulton, William Fiddian" . In Lee, Sidney (ed.). Dictionary of National Biography (1st supplement). London: Smith, Elder & Co.
- John Wesley's School at Kingswood by John Telford
