= David Moore Crook =

British fighter pilot (1914–1944)

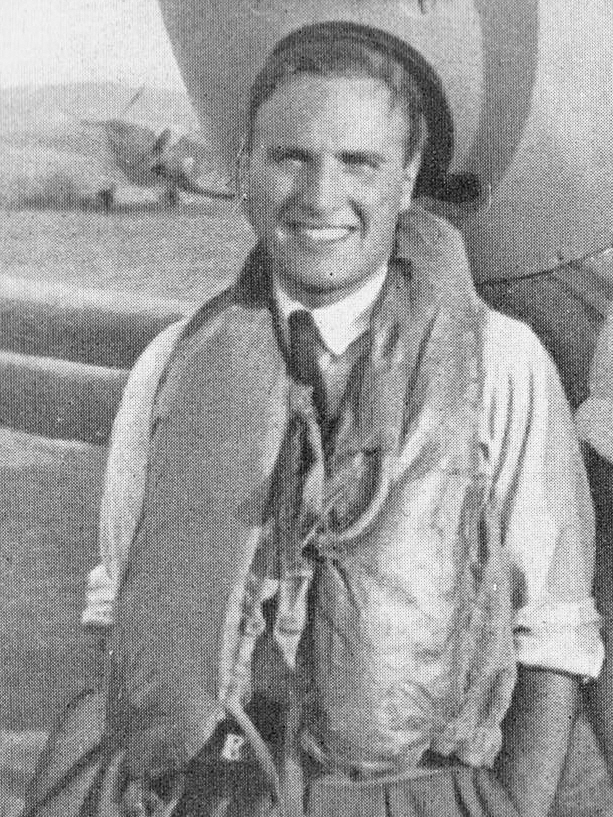
- David Moore Crook photographed in September 1940. Copied from his autobiography Spitfire Pilot (1942)
- Born: 24 November 1914; Huddersfield, England
- Died: 18 December 1944 (aged 30) near Aberdeen, Scotland
- Military career
- Allegiance: United Kingdom
- Branch: Royal Air Force
- Service years: 1938–1944
- Rank: Flying Officer
- Nickname: DMC
- Unit: No. 609 Squadron RAF
- Conflicts: Second World War: Battle of Britain
- Awards: Distinguished Flying Cross

David Moore Crook, DFC (24 November 1914 – 18 December 1944) was a British fighter pilot and flying ace of the Second World War.

== RAF career ==
After attending the University of Cambridge, he was mobilised as part of the Royal Auxiliary Air Force on the outbreak of war. Flying the Spitfire Crook participated in the Battle of Britain, flying with No. 609 Squadron RAF (at the time this was a squadron of the Auxiliary Air Force). He initially joined the squadron on 22 September 1938 as an acting pilot officer, this rank was confirmed on 4 May 1940, and later further back-dated to 9 December 1939. He destroyed a Junkers Ju 87 of Sturzkampfgeschwader 77 (StG 77) on 9 July, and a Jagdgeschwader 53 (JG 53) Messerschmitt Bf 109 on 13 August. On 15 August 1940, he mistakenly shot down a Blenheim fighter, although the crew was only slightly injured. Two Bf 109's were claimed on 30 September 1940.

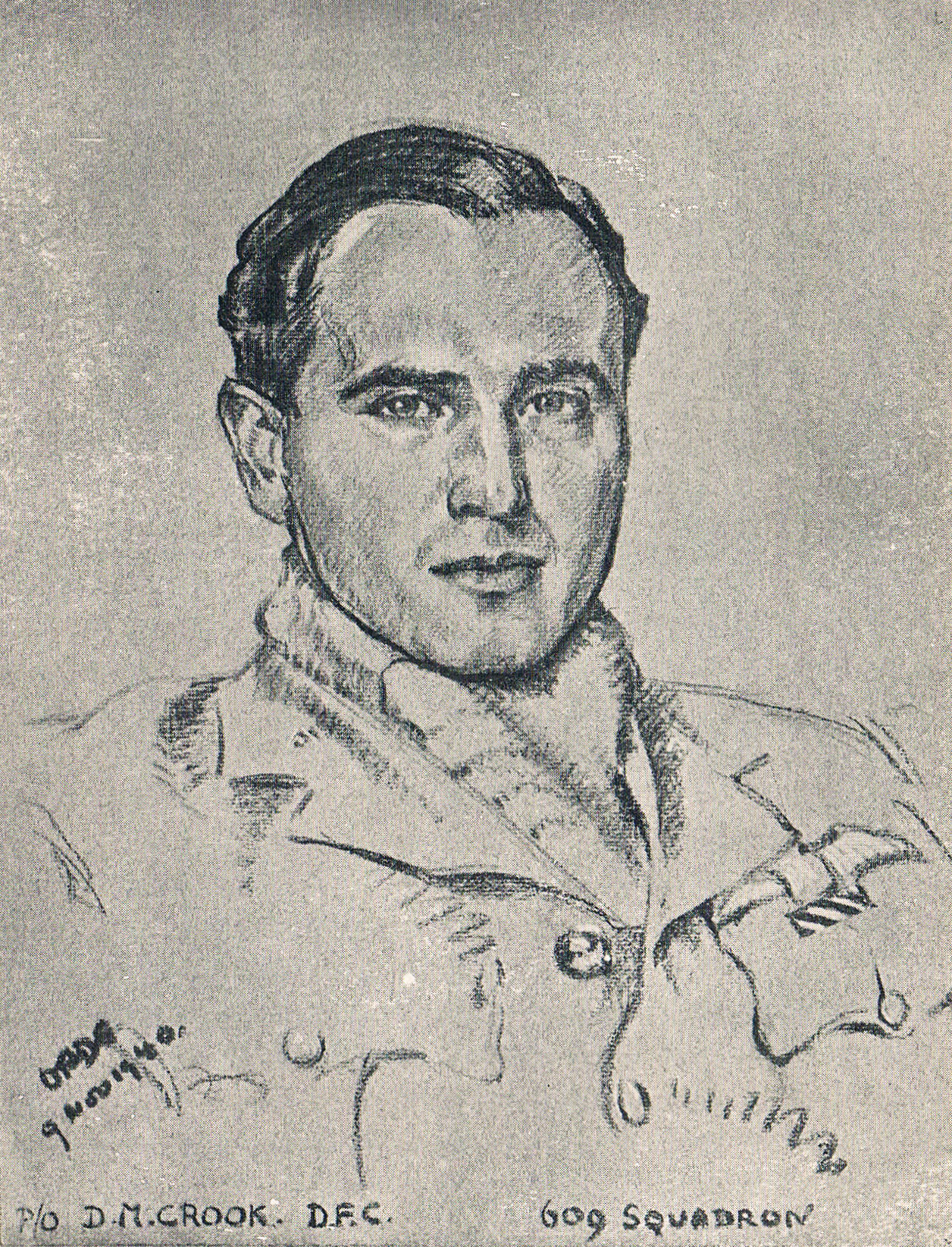
David Moore Crook portrait by Cuthbert Orde, November 1940, reproduced in Spitfire Pilot (1942).

Crook was awarded the Distinguished Flying Cross for his actions during the battle. The official notice of this award in the London Gazette of 1 November 1940 said he had, "led his section with coolness and judgment against the enemy on many occasions. He has destroyed six of their aircraft besides damaging several more."

On 8 November he was sent on an Instructor's course at the Central Flying School. He was promoted to flying officer with effect 9 December 1940. In April 1944 he was posted to AFU Wheaton Aston, and in July to AFU Ternhill. He served with 41 OTU in September, then 8 (Coastal) OTU at Dyce.

Flying Spitfire IX EN662 on 18 December 1944 on a high level photographic sortie, Crook was seen to dive into the sea near Aberdeen. He was officially listed as missing in action. When collecting his belongings they found a Bible and a copy of "The Wind in the Willows" by Kenneth Grahame on his bed. A few days earlier he had celebrated his thirtieth birthday.

== Memorials ==
He left a widow, Dorothy Margaret Crook, of Shrewsbury, Shropshire. He is commemorated on the Runnymede Memorial. His name is displayed on the Battle of Britain Monument in London, and a plane flown by Crook is on display at the Imperial War Museum in London.

== Writings ==
Crook wrote an autobiographical work about his experiences during the battle entitled Spitfire Pilot, published by Faber and Faber in 1942. A portrait of Crook by official RAF artist Captain Cuthbert Orde was reproduced on the frontispiece. Crook also wrote Pursuit of Passy, a work of fiction about an RAF pilot who crashes in France and joins the Resistance, published in 1946 by Herbert Joseph. Crook's flying log book is stored at The National Archives in Kew, and is available for public viewing.

A new paperback edition of his memoir Spitfire Pilot was published by Greenhill Books in October 2021. The new edition includes an introduction by the British historian Richard Overy, a Preface by the author's daughter Rosemary Lloyd, and an article by Air Vice-Marshal A F C Hunter, Honorary Air Commodore of the No. 609 (West Riding) Squadron.
