= Richard Green Moulton =

19th/20th-century English academic

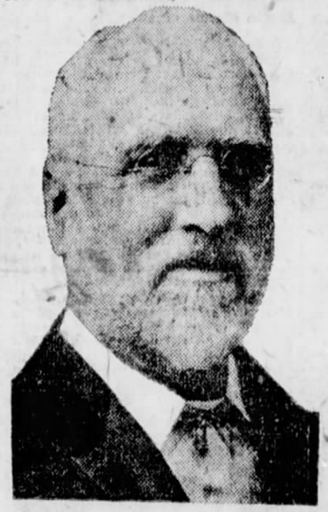
- Born: May 5, 1849; England
- Died: 15 August 1924 (aged 75); Tunbridge Wells, England
- Education: University of London; University of Cambridge; University of Pennsylvania
- Occupation(s): Educator, lawyer, writer
- Employer: University of Chicago

Richard Green Moulton (5 May 1849 – 15 August 1924) was an English professor, author, and lawyer.

== Biography ==
Richard Green Moulton was born in England in 1849. He was the brother of William Fiddian Moulton, John Fletcher Moulton, and James Egan Moulton.

He attended New Kingswood School, Bath, from 1861-1865. In August 1864 he sat for the Oxford Local Examinations, and was the highest performing student to have sat for those examinations in Bath. He then attended Cleveden College, Northampton, and passed with honours the Matriculation examination for the University of London.

He received degrees from the University of London, University of Cambridge, and University of Pennsylvania. After teaching at Cambridge, the American Society Extension University, and the London Society for the Extension of University Education, he became a professor of English literature at the University of Chicago in 1892. He held that post until 1919, after which he returned to live in England.

He died at his home in Tunbridge Wells on 15 August 1924.

== Selected publications ==
- The Modern Readers Bible History Series. The Chronicles (1897) New York, The MacMillan Company.
- Shakespeare as a dramatic artist; a popular illustration of the principles of scientific criticism. (1885) Oxford, Clarendon Press.
- The ancient classical drama; a study in literary evolution intended for readers in English and in the original. (1890). Oxford, The Clarendon Press.
- The literary study of the Bible. An account of the leading forms of literature represented in the sacred writings. (1896). London, Isbister & Co.
- Select masterpieces of Biblical literature. (1901). New York, The Macmillan company; London, Macmillan & co., ltd.
- A short introduction to the literature of the Bible. (1901). Boston, D. C. Heath & Co.
- The Modern Reader's Bible Translation (1907). New York, The Macmillan Company.
- The Bible at a single view. (1918). With an appendix, how to read the Bible. New York, The Macmillan company.
