= Wrestling at the 1968 Summer Olympics – Men's freestyle 70 kg =

Men's freestyle lightweight at the Games of the XIX Olympiad
- Venue: Insurgentes Ice Rink
- Date: 17 – 20 October 1968
- Competitors: 26 from 26 nations

Medalists
1st place, gold medalist(s)		Abdollah Movahed	Iran
2nd place, silver medalist(s)		Enyu Valchev	Bulgaria
3rd place, bronze medalist(s)		Danzandarjaagiin Sereeter	Mongolia

The Men's Freestyle lightweight at the 1968 Summer Olympics as part of the wrestling program were held at the Insurgentes Ice Rink from October 17 to October 20. The lightweight allowed wrestlers up to 70 kilograms.

== Tournament results ==
The competition used a form of negative points tournament, with negative points given for any result short of a fall. Accumulation of 6 negative points eliminated the wrestler. When only two or three wrestlers remain, a special final round is used to determine the order of the medals.

Legend

- TF — Won by Fall
- DQ — Won by Passivity or forfeit
- D2 — Both wrestlers lost by Passivity
- DNA — Did not appear

Penalties

- 0 — Won by Fall and Disqualification
- 0.5 — Won by Technical Superiority
- 1 — Won by Points
- 2 — Draw
- 2.5 — Draw, Passivity
- 3 — Lost by Points
- 3.5 — Lost by Technical Superiority
- 4 — Lost by Fall and Disqualification

=== 1st round ===
TPP	MPP		Score		MPP	TPP
0	0	Udey Chand (IND)	TF / 1:55	Ángel Aldana (GUA)	4	4
0	0	Klaus Rost (FRG)	TF / 2:20	Roger Till (GBR)	4	4
3	3	Carlos Vario (ARG)		Francisco Lebeque (CUB)	1	1
0.5	0.5	Abdollah Movahed (IRI)		Gordon Garvie (CAN)	3.5	3.5
0	0	Guy Marchand (FRA)	TF / 3:01	Eliseo Salugta (PHI)	4	4
3.5	3.5	Sidney Marsh (AUS)		Danzandarjaagiin Sereeter (MGL)	0.5	0.5
0.5	0.5	Seyyit Ahmet Ağralı (TUR)		Israel Vargas (MEX)	3.5	3.5
1	1	Muhammad Taj (PAK)		Stefanos Ioannidis (GRE)	3	3
3	3	Jan Karlsson (SWE)		Enyu Valchev (BUL)	1	1
2	2	Wayne Wells (USA)		Zarbeg Beriashvili (URS)	2	2
4	4	Severino Aguilar (PAN)	TF / 2:16	Ion Enache (ROU)	0	0
1	1	Janusz Pająk (POL)		Aka-Jahan Dastagir (AFG)	3	3
1	1	Iwao Horiuchi (JPN)		Károly Buzás (HUN)	3	3

=== 2nd round ===
TPP	MPP		Score		MPP	TPP
3	3	Udey Chand (IND)		Klaus Rost (FRG)	1	1
8	4	Ángel Aldana (GUA)	TF / 2:15	Roger Till (GBR)	0	4
6,5	3.5	Carlos Vario (ARG)		Abdollah Movahed (IRI)	0.5	1
1	0	Francisco Lebeque (CUB)	TF / 10:50	Gordon Garvie (CAN)	4	7.5
1	1	Guy Marchand (FRA)		Sidney Marsh (AUS)	3	6.5
8	4	Eliseo Salugta (PHI)	TF / 0:57	Danzandarjaagiin Sereeter (MGL)	0	0.5
1.5	1	Seyyit Ahmet Ağralı (TUR)		Muhammad Taj (PAK)	3	4
6,5	3	Israel Vargas (MEX)		Stefanos Ioannidis (GRE)	1	4
6	3	Jan Karlsson (SWE)		Wayne Wells (USA)	1	3
3	2	Enyu Valchev (BUL)		Zarbeg Beriashvili (URS)	2	4
8	4	Severino Aguilar (PAN)	TF / 1:14	Janusz Pająk (POL)	0	1
4	4	Ion Enache (ROU)	DQ	Iwao Horiuchi (JPN)	0	1
7	4	Aka-Jahan Dastagir (AFG)	DQ	Károly Buzás (HUN)	4	7

=== 3rd round ===
TPP	MPP		Score		MPP	TPP
3	0	Udey Chand (IND)	TF / 2:07	Roger Till (GBR)	4	8
2	1	Klaus Rost (FRG)		Francisco Lebeque (CUB)	3	4
1.5	0.5	Abdollah Movahed (IRI)		Guy Marchand (FRA)	3.5	4.5
1.5	1	Danzandarjaagiin Sereeter (MGL)		Seyyit Ahmet Ağralı (TUR)	3	4.5
8	4	Muhammad Taj (PAK)	TF / 1:38	Enyu Valchev (BUL)	0	3
8	4	Stefanos Ioannidis (GRE)	TF / 8:15	Wayne Wells (USA)	0	3
4	0	Zarbeg Beriashvili (URS)	TF / 2:10	Ion Enache (ROU)	4	8
4	3	Janusz Pająk (POL)		Iwao Horiuchi (JPN)	1	2

=== 4th round ===
TPP	MPP		Score		MPP	TPP
3	0	Udey Chand (IND)		Francisco Lebeque (CUB)	4	8
5.5	3.5	Klaus Rost (FRG)		Abdollah Movahed (IRI)	0.5	2
8.5	4	Guy Marchand (FRA)	TF / 1:52	Danzandarjaagiin Sereeter (MGL)	0	1.5
8.5	4	Seyyit Ahmet Ağralı (TUR)	TF / 10:28	Enyu Valchev (BUL)	0	3
4	1	Wayne Wells (USA)		Janusz Pająk (POL)	3	7
5	1	Zarbeg Beriashvili (URS)		Iwao Horiuchi (JPN)	3	5

=== 5th round ===
TPP	MPP		Score		MPP	TPP
6	3	Udey Chand (IND)		Abdollah Movahed (IRI)	1	3
9.5	4	Klaus Rost (FRG)	TF / 10:38	Enyu Valchev (BUL)	0	4
4.5	3	Danzandarjaagiin Sereeter (MGL)		Zarbeg Beriashvili (URS)	1	6
5	1	Wayne Wells (USA)		Iwao Horiuchi (JPN)	3	8

=== 6th round ===
TPP	MPP		Score		MPP	TPP
4	1	Abdollah Movahed (IRI)		Danzandarjaagiin Sereeter (MGL)	3	7.5
4	1	Enyu Valchev (BUL)		Wayne Wells (USA)	3	8

=== Final round ===
TPP	MPP		Score		MPP	TPP
5	1	Abdollah Movahed (IRI)		Enyu Valchev (BUL)	3	7

== Final standings ==
1. Abdollah Movahed (IRI)
2. Enyu Valchev (BUL)
3. Danzandarjaagiin Sereeter (MGL)
4. Wayne Wells (USA)
5. Zarbeg Beriashvili (URS)
6. Udey Chand (IND)

== Sources ==
- Trueblood, Beatrice, ed. (1969). Official Report of the Organizing Committee of the Games of the XIX Olympiad Mexico 1968 (Volume 3) (PDF). Vol. 3. pp. 335, 716–721. Archived from the original (PDF) on April 28, 2015.
