= Wrestling at the 1972 Summer Olympics – Men's freestyle 74 kg =

Men's freestyle 74 kg at the Games of the XX Olympiad
- Venue: Messe München
- Dates: 27–31 August 1972
- Competitors: 25 from 25 nations

Medalists
1st place, gold medalist(s)		Wayne Wells	United States
2nd place, silver medalist(s)		Jan Karlsson	Sweden
3rd place, bronze medalist(s)		Adolf Seger	West Germany

The Men's Freestyle 74 kg at the 1972 Summer Olympics as part of the wrestling program at the Fairgrounds, Judo and Wrestling Hall.

== Medalists ==
Gold	Wayne Wells; United States
Silver	Jan Karlsson; Sweden
Bronze	Adolf Seger; West Germany

== Tournament results ==
The competition used a form of negative points tournament, with negative points given for any result short of a fall. Accumulation of 6 negative points eliminated the wrestler. When only two or three wrestlers remain, a special final round is used to determine the order of the medals.

Legend

- DNA — Did not appear
- TPP — Total penalty points
- MPP — Match penalty points

Penalties

- 0 — Won by Fall, Passivity, Injury and Forfeit
- 0.5 — Won by Technical Superiority
- 1 — Won by Points
- 2 — Draw
- 2.5 — Draw, Passivity
- 3 — Lost by Points
- 3.5 — Lost by Technical Superiority
- 4 — Lost by Fall, Passivity, Injury and Forfeit

=== Round 1 ===
TPP	MPP		Time		MPP	TPP
4	4	Toshitada Yoshida (JPN)	7:31	Francisco Lebeque (CUB)	4	4
0	0	Adolf Seger (FRG)	8:23	Alfred Wurr (CAN)	4	4
1	1	Yuri Gusov (URS)		Ludovic Ambruș (ROU)	3	3
3	3	Bruce Akers (AUS)		Mukhtiar Singh (IND)	1	1
3	3	Daniel Robin (FRA)		Yancho Pavlov (BUL)	1	1
4	4	Bachir Hani Abou Assi (LIB)	5:06	Robert Blaser (SUI)	0	0
3.5	3.5	Bruno Hartmann (AUT)		Danzandarjaagiin Sereeter (MGL)	0.5	0.5
0	0	Wayne Wells (USA)	5:59	Mehmet Ali Demirtaş (TUR)	4	4
3	3	Tony Shacklady (GBR)		Miroslav Musil (TCH)	1	1
4	4	Nestor González (ARG)	5:07	Wolfgang Nitschke (GDR)	0	0
0	0	Jan Karlsson (SWE)	2:28	Shakar Khan Shakar (AFG)	4	4
3	3	Muhammad Yaghoub (PAK)		Miklós Urbanovics (HUN)	1	1
0		Mansour Barzegar (IRI)		Bye		

=== Round 2 ===
TPP	MPP		Time		MPP	TPP
0.5	0.5	Mansour Barzegar (IRI)		Toshitada Yoshida (JPN)	3.5	7.5
8	4	Francisco Lebeque (CUB)	2:55	Adolf Seger (FRG)	0	0
8	4	Alfred Wurr (CAN)	3:51	Yuri Gusov (URS)	0	1
3.5	0.5	Ludovic Ambruș (ROU)		Bruce Akers (AUS)	3.5	6.5
5	4	Mukhtiar Singh (IND)	2:24	Daniel Robin (FRA)	0	3
1	0	Yancho Pavlov (BUL)	2:02	Bachir Hani Abou Assi (LIB)	4	8
1	1	Robert Blaser (SUI)		Bruno Hartmann (AUT)	3	6.5
4.5	4	Danzandarjaagiin Sereeter (MGL)	8:25	Wayne Wells (USA)	0	0
5	1	Mehmet Ali Demirtaş (TUR)		Tony Shacklady (GBR)	3	6
1	0	Miroslav Musil (TCH)	4:46	Nestor González (ARG)	4	8
1	1	Wolfgang Nitschke (GDR)		Jan Karlsson (SWE)	3	3
6	2	Shakar Khan Shakar (AFG)		Muhammad Yaghoub (PAK)	2	5
1		Miklós Urbanovics (HUN)		Bye		

=== Round 3 ===
TPP	MPP		Time		MPP	TPP
3.5	2.5	Miklós Urbanovics (HUN)		Mansour Barzegar (IRI)	2.5	3
1	1	Adolf Seger (FRG)		Yuri Gusov (URS)	3	4
3.5	0	Ludovic Ambruș (ROU)	2:27	Mukhtiar Singh (IND)	4	9
3	0	Daniel Robin (FRA)	4:17	Robert Blaser (SUI)	4	5
2	1	Yancho Pavlov (BUL)		Danzandarjaagiin Sereeter (MGL)	3	7.5
0	0	Wayne Wells (USA)	1:24	Miroslav Musil (TCH)	4	5
9	4	Mehmet Ali Demirtaş (TUR)	8:18	Wolfgang Nitschke (GDR)	0	1
3	0	Jan Karlsson (SWE)	3:49	Muhammad Yaghoub (PAK)	4	9

=== Round 4 ===
TPP	MPP		Time		MPP	TPP
6.5	3	Miklós Urbanovics (HUN)		Adolf Seger (FRG)	1	2
3	0	Mansour Barzegar (IRI)	6:18	Yuri Gusov (URS)	4	8
6.5	3	Ludovic Ambruș (ROU)		Daniel Robin (FRA)	1	4
2.5	0.5	Yancho Pavlov (BUL)		Robert Blaser (SUI)	3.5	8.5
1	1	Wayne Wells (USA)		Wolfgang Nitschke (GDR)	3	4
9	4	Miroslav Musil (TCH)	5:36	Jan Karlsson (SWE)	0	3

=== Round 5 ===
TPP	MPP		Time		MPP	TPP
7	4	Mansour Barzegar (IRI)	5:18	Adolf Seger (FRG)	0	2
7	3	Daniel Robin (FRA)		Wayne Wells (USA)	1	2
3.5	1	Yancho Pavlov (BUL)		Wolfgang Nitschke (GDR)	3	7
3		Jan Karlsson (SWE)		Bye		

=== Round 6 ===
TPP	MPP		Time		MPP	TPP
4	1	Jan Karlsson (SWE)		Adolf Seger (FRG)	3	5
7.5	4	Yancho Pavlov (BUL)	6:37	Wayne Wells (USA)	0	2

=== Final ===
Results from the preliminary round are carried forward into the final (shown in yellow).

TPP	MPP		Time		MPP	TPP
	1	Jan Karlsson (SWE)		Adolf Seger (FRG)	3	
4	3	Jan Karlsson (SWE)		Wayne Wells (USA)	1	
6	3	Adolf Seger (FRG)		Wayne Wells (USA)	1	2

== Final standings ==
1. Wayne Wells (USA)
2. Jan Karlsson (SWE)
3. Adolf Seger (FRG)
4. Yancho Pavlov (BUL)
5. Daniel Robin (FRA), Mansour Barzegar (IRI) and Wolfgang Nitschke (GDR)
