= India at the 1968 Summer Olympics =

- IOC code: IND
- NOC: Indian Olympic Association

in Mexico City
- Competitors: 25 in 5 sports
- Medals Ranked 42nd: Gold 0 Silver 0 Bronze 1 Total 1

Summer Olympics appearances (overview)
- 1900; 1904–1912; 1920; 1924; 1928; 1932; 1936; 1948; 1952; 1956; 1960; 1964; 1968; 1972; 1976; 1980; 1984; 1988; 1992; 1996; 2000; 2004; 2008; 2012; 2016; 2020; 2024

India competed at the 1968 Summer Olympics in Mexico City, Mexico. 25 competitors, all men, took part in 11 events in 5 sports. They won one bronze medal.

== Competitors ==
Sports	Men	Women	Total	Events
Athletics	2	0	2	2
Field hockey	15	0	15	1
Shooting	2	0	2	2
Weightlifting	1	0	1	1
Wrestling	5	0	5	5
Total	25	0	25	11

== Medalists ==
=== Bronze ===
Field hockey, Men's Team Competition. Team members:

- Ajit Pal Singh
- Balbir Singh I (b. 5 April 1945 in Sansarpur)
- Balbir Singh II (b. 27 February 1941 in Sansarpur)
- Balbir Singh III (b. 21 September 1945 in Faisalabad)
- Gurbux Singh
- Harbinder Singh
- Harmik Singh
- Inam-ur Rahman
- Inder Singh
- Krishnamurthy Perumal
- Munir Sait
- John Victor Peter
- Prithipal Singh
- Rajendra Absolem Christy
- Tarsem Singh

== Athletics ==
Men's Hammer Throw

- Praveen Kumar Sobti

- Qualification Round — 60.84(→ 20th place)

== Field hockey ==
=== Preliminary round ===
==== Pool A ====
Pos	Team	Pld	W	D	L	GF	GA	GD	Pts	Qualification
1	India	7	6	0	1	20	4	+16	12	Semi-finals
2	West Germany	7	5	1	1	15	5	+10	11	Semi-finals
3	New Zealand	7	3	4	0	8	4	+4	10	
4	Spain	7	2	3	2	7	5	+2	7	
5	Belgium	7	3	1	3	14	9	+5	7	
6	East Germany	7	2	2	3	7	10	−3	6	
7	Japan	7	1	1	5	4	14	−10	3	
8	Mexico (H)	7	0	0	7	2	26	−24	0	

Source: Sports-Reference
(H) Hosts

13 October 1968

New Zealand	2–1	India

14 October 1968

India	2–1	West Germany

15 October 1968

India	8–0	Mexico

17 October 1968

India	1–0	Spain

18 October 1968

India	2–1	Belgium
Prithipal 44'; Harbinder 52'	Report	Gilles 12'

20 October 1968

India	5–0 ^{1}	Japan

^{1} The match was abandoned in the 55th minute with the score 0-0 after the Japanese team laid down their sticks and walked off the pitch to protest the awarding of a penalty stroke to India. India were awarded the match 5-0.

21 October 1968

India	1–0	East Germany

=== Semi-finals ===
24 October 1968

India	1–2 (a.e.t.)	Australia
Balbir Singh	Report	Glencross 17', 84'

=== Bronze-medal match ===
26 October 1968

India	2–1	West Germany
? Balbir Singh	Report

== Shooting ==
Two shooters represented India in 1968.

Trap

- Karni Singh

- Qualification Round — 194(→ 10th place)

- Randhir Singh

- Qualification Round — 192(→ 17th place)

Skeet

- Karni Singh

- Qualification Round — 187(→ 28th place)

== Wrestling ==
Key:

- VT - Victory by Fall.
- Pt - Decision by Points.
- Os - Obvious Superiority.

Men's Freestyle

Athlete	Event	Round 1 Result	Round 2 Result	Round 3 Result	Round 4 Result	Round 5 Result	Round 6 Result	Round 7 Result	Rank
Sudesh Kumar	−52 kg	Boris Dimovski (YUG); W ^{Os}	Gustavo Ramírez (GUA); W ^{VT}	Wanelge Castillo (PAN); L ^{Pt}	Bye	Richard Sanders (USA); L ^{VT}	did not advance		6
Bishambar Singh	−57 kg	Bye	Herbert Singerman (CAN); W ^{Os}	Hasan Sevinç (TUR); W ^{Pt}	Donald Behm (USA); L ^{Os}	Yojiro Uetake (JPN); L ^{Os}	did not advance		-
Udey Chand	−70 kg	Ángel Aldana (GUA); W ^{VT}	Klaus Rost (FRG); W ^{Pt}	Roger Till (GBR); W ^{VT}	Francisco Lebeque (CUB); L ^{VT}	Abdollah Movahed (IRN); L ^{Pt}	did not advance		6
Mukhtiar Singh	−78 kg	Yury Shakhmuradov (URS); L ^{VT}	Tatsuo Sasaki (JPN); L ^{VT}	did not advance				—N/a	-

Men's Greco-Roman

Athlete	Event	Round 1 Result	Round 2 Result	Round 3 Result	Round 4 Result	Round 5 Result	Round 6 Result	Rank
Sudesh Kumar	−52 kg	Mohamed Karmous (MAR); Draw	Imre Alker (HUN); L ^{VT}	did not advance				-
