= Wrestling at the 1964 Summer Olympics – Men's freestyle lightweight =

Wrestling at the Olympics

Men's freestyle lightweight at the Games of the XVIII Olympiad
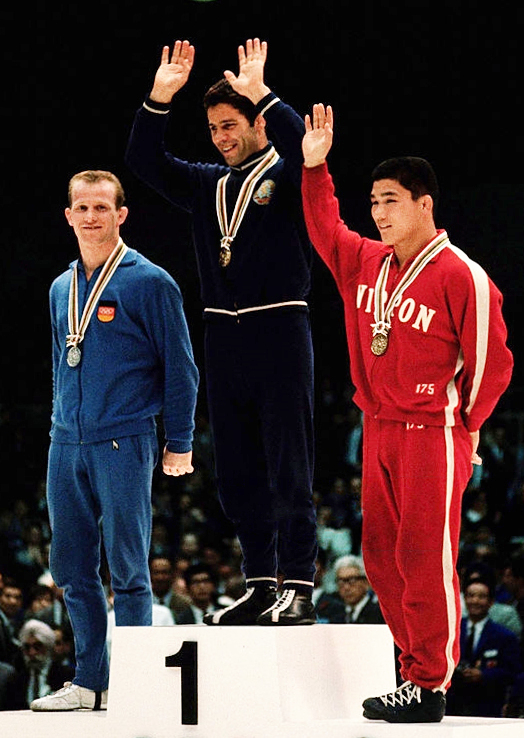
- Medal winners
- Venue: Komazawa Gymnasium
- Dates: 11–14 October 1964
- Competitors: 22 from 22 nations

Medalists
1st place, gold medalist(s)		Enyu Valchev	Bulgaria
2nd place, silver medalist(s)		Klaus Rost	United Team of Germany
3rd place, bronze medalist(s)		Iwao Horiuchi	Japan

The men's freestyle lightweight competition at the 1964 Summer Olympics in Tokyo took place from 11 to 14 October at the Komazawa Gymnasium. Nations were limited to one competitor. Lightweight was the fourth-lightest category, including wrestlers weighing 63 to 70 kilograms (138.9 to 154.3 lb).

== Competition format ==
This freestyle wrestling competition continued to use the "bad points" elimination system introduced at the 1928 Summer Olympics for Greco-Roman and at the 1932 Summer Olympics for freestyle wrestling, as adjusted at the 1960 Summer Olympics. Each bout awarded 4 points. If the victory was by fall, the winner received 0 and the loser 4. If the victory was by decision, the winner received 1 and the loser 3. If the bout was tied, each wrestler received 2 points. A wrestler who accumulated 6 or more points was eliminated. Rounds continued until there were 3 or fewer uneliminated wrestlers. If only 1 wrestler remained, he received the gold medal. If 2 wrestlers remained, point totals were ignored and they faced each other for gold and silver (if they had already wrestled each other, that result was used). If 3 wrestlers remained, point totals were ignored and a round-robin was held among those 3 to determine medals (with previous head-to-head results, if any, counting for this round-robin).

== Results ==
=== Round 1 ===
Bouts

Winner	Nation	Victory Type	Loser	Nation
Mahmut Atalay	Turkey	Decision	Zarbeg Beriashvili	Soviet Union
Muhammad Bashir	Pakistan	Decision	Stefanos Ioannidis	Greece
Udey Chand	India	Decision	Arto Savolainen	Finland
Enyu Valchev	Bulgaria	Fall	Tham Kook Chin	Malaysia
Gregory Ruth	United States	Decision	Matti Poikala	Sweden
Iwao Horiuchi	Japan	Decision	Danzandarjaagiin Sereeter	Mongolia
Sidney Marsh	Australia	Fall	Alejandro Echaniz	Mexico
Abdullah Movahed	Iran	Decision	Kenny Stephenson	Great Britain
Klaus Rost	United Team of Germany	Decision	Rodger Doner	Canada
Jeong Dong-gu	South Korea	Decision	Tony Greig	New Zealand
Djan-Aka Djan	Afghanistan	Decision	Carlos Alberto Vario	Argentina

Points

Rank	Wrestler	Nation	R1
1	Sidney Marsh	Australia	0
1	Enyu Valchev	Bulgaria	0
3	Mahmut Atalay	Turkey	1
3	Muhammad Bashir	Pakistan	1
3	Udey Chand	India	1
3	Djan-Aka Djan	Afghanistan	1
3	Iwao Horiuchi	Japan	1
3	Jeong Dong-gu	South Korea	1
3	Abdullah Movahed	Iran	1
3	Klaus Rost	United Team of Germany	1
3	Gregory Ruth	United States	1
12	Zarbeg Beriashvili	Soviet Union	3
12	Danzandarjaagiin Sereeter	Mongolia	3
12	Rodger Doner	Canada	3
12	Tony Greig	New Zealand	3
12	Stefanos Ioannidis	Greece	3
12	Matti Poikala	Sweden	3
12	Arto Savolainen	Finland	3
12	Kenny Stephenson	Great Britain	3
12	Carlos Alberto Vario	Argentina	3
21	Alejandro Echaniz	Mexico	4
21	Tham Kook Chin	Malaysia	4

=== Round 2 ===
Valchev was the only wrestler to win both of his bouts by fall to stay at 0 points. Seven wrestlers were eliminated with losses in each of the first two rounds. Fifteen advanced to round 3.

Bouts

Winner	Nation	Victory Type	Loser	Nation
Mahmut Atalay	Turkey	Decision	Stefanos Ioannidis	Greece
Zarbeg Beriashvili	Soviet Union	Decision	Muhammad Bashir	Pakistan
Enyu Valchev	Bulgaria	Fall	Udey Chand	India
Arto Savolainen	Finland	Fall	Tham Kook Chin	Malaysia
Iwao Horiuchi	Japan	Decision	Matti Poikala	Sweden
Gregory Ruth	United States	Decision	Danzandarjaagiin Sereeter	Mongolia
Kenny Stephenson	Great Britain	Decision	Alejandro Echaniz	Mexico
Abdullah Movahed	Iran	Decision	Sidney Marsh	Australia
Klaus Rost	United Team of Germany	Fall	Tony Greig	New Zealand
Jeong Dong-gu	South Korea	Decision	Djan-Aka Djan	Afghanistan
Carlos Alberto Vario	Argentina	Decision	Rodger Doner	Canada

Points

Rank	Wrestler	Nation	R1	R2	Total
1	Enyu Valchev	Bulgaria	0	0	0
2	Klaus Rost	United Team of Germany	1	0	1
3	Mahmut Atalay	Turkey	1	1	2
3	Iwao Horiuchi	Japan	1	1	2
3	Jeong Dong-gu	South Korea	1	1	2
3	Abdullah Movahed	Iran	1	1	2
3	Gregory Ruth	United States	1	1	2
8	Sidney Marsh	Australia	0	3	3
8	Arto Savolainen	Finland	3	0	3
10	Muhammad Bashir	Pakistan	1	3	4
10	Zarbeg Beriashvili	Soviet Union	3	1	4
10	Djan-Aka Djan	Afghanistan	1	3	4
10	Kenny Stephenson	Great Britain	3	1	4
10	Carlos Alberto Vario	Argentina	3	1	4
10	Udey Chand	India	1	4	5
16	Danzandarjaagiin Sereeter	Mongolia	3	3	6
16	Rodger Doner	Canada	3	3	6
16	Stefanos Ioannidis	Greece	3	3	6
16	Matti Poikala	Sweden	3	3	6
20	Alejandro Echaniz	Mexico	4	3	7
20	Tony Greig	New Zealand	3	4	7
20	Tham Kook Chin	Malaysia	4	4	8

=== Round 3 ===
Five competitors were eliminated, leaving 10 to continue forward. Valchev, with his third win by fall, stayed at 0 points.

Bouts

Winner	Nation	Victory Type	Loser	Nation
Mahmut Atalay	Turkey	Fall	Muhammad Bashir	Pakistan
Zarbeg Beriashvili	Soviet Union	Decision	Udey Chand	India
Enyu Valchev	Bulgaria	Fall	Arto Savolainen	Finland
Iwao Horiuchi	Japan	Decision	Gregory Ruth	United States
Sidney Marsh	Australia	Decision	Kenny Stephenson	Great Britain
Abdullah Movahed	Iran	Decision	Jeong Dong-gu	South Korea
Klaus Rost	United Team of Germany	Decision	Djan-Aka Djan	Afghanistan
Carlos Alberto Vario	Argentina	Bye	N/A	N/A

Points

Rank	Wrestler	Nation	R1	R2	R3	Total
1	Enyu Valchev	Bulgaria	0	0	0	0
2	Mahmut Atalay	Turkey	1	1	0	2
2	Klaus Rost	United Team of Germany	1	0	1	2
4	Iwao Horiuchi	Japan	1	1	1	3
4	Abdullah Movahed	Iran	1	1	1	3
6	Sidney Marsh	Australia	0	3	1	4
6	Carlos Alberto Vario	Argentina	3	1	0	4
8	Zarbeg Beriashvili	Soviet Union	3	1	1	5
8	Jeong Dong-gu	South Korea	1	1	3	5
8	Gregory Ruth	United States	1	1	3	5
11	Udey Chand	India	1	4	3	7
11	Djan-Aka Djan	Afghanistan	1	3	3	7
11	Arto Savolainen	Finland	3	0	4	7
11	Kenny Stephenson	Great Britain	3	1	3	7
15	Muhammad Bashir	Pakistan	1	3	4	8

=== Round 4 ===
This round was highly unusual in that 3 of the 4 winners were eliminated along with only 2 of the 4 losers. Beriashvili defeated Valchev to give the latter wrestler his first points, but the Soviet picked up his 6th point in doing so and was eliminated. The match between Ruth and Marsh resulted in both wrestlers receiving enough points for elimination. The bout between Horiuchi and Movahed, where a victory of any kind would eliminate the loser and allow the victor to continue, resulted in a draw—keeping both men in the competition.

Bouts

Winner	Nation	Victory Type	Loser	Nation
Mahmut Atalay	Turkey	Decision	Carlos Alberto Vario	Argentina
Zarbeg Beriashvili	Soviet Union	Decision	Enyu Valchev	Bulgaria
Gregory Ruth	United States	Decision	Sidney Marsh	Australia
Iwao Horiuchi	Japan	Tie	Abdullah Movahed	Iran
Jeong Dong-gu	South Korea	Decision	Klaus Rost	United Team of Germany

Points

Rank	Wrestler	Nation	R1	R2	R3	R4	Total
1	Mahmut Atalay	Turkey	1	1	0	1	3
1	Enyu Valchev	Bulgaria	0	0	0	3	3
3	Iwao Horiuchi	Japan	1	1	1	2	5
3	Abdullah Movahed	Iran	1	1	1	2	5
3	Klaus Rost	United Team of Germany	1	0	1	3	5
6	Zarbeg Beriashvili	Soviet Union	3	1	1	1	6
6	Jeong Dong-gu	South Korea	1	1	3	1	6
6	Gregory Ruth	United States	1	1	3	1	6
9	Sidney Marsh	Australia	0	3	1	3	7
9	Carlos Alberto Vario	Argentina	3	1	0	3	7

=== Round 5 ===
Rost had the great fortune to receive the bye in this round, guaranteeing he would continue while the field narrowed. Horiuchi's victory over Atalay in this round eliminated both men at 6 points; it also ultimately served as the tie-breaker between the two for the bronze medal. In the other match of the round, Movahed needed a win by fall to stay in competition, while Valchev would continue with any win or a tie. A Movahed victory by decision would eliminate both (and leave Rost alone uneliminated). Ultimately, the match ended in a tie; Valchev continued on to face Rost in the final while Movahed took 5th place.

Bouts

Winner	Nation	Victory Type	Loser	Nation
Iwao Horiuchi	Japan	Decision	Mahmut Atalay	Turkey
Enyu Valchev	Bulgaria	Tie	Abdullah Movahed	Iran
Klaus Rost	United Team of Germany	Bye	N/A	N/A

Points

Rank	Wrestler	Nation	R1	R2	R3	R4	R5	Total
1	Klaus Rost	United Team of Germany	1	0	1	3	0	5
1	Enyu Valchev	Bulgaria	0	0	0	3	2	5
3rd place, bronze medalist(s)	Iwao Horiuchi	Japan	1	1	1	2	1	6
4	Mahmut Atalay	Turkey	1	1	0	1	3	6
5	Abdullah Movahed	Iran	1	1	1	2	2	7

=== Final round ===
With only two wrestlers left, they faced each other in a gold medal bout. Valchev defeated Rost by decision.

Bouts

Winner	Nation	Victory Type	Loser	Nation
Enyu Valchev	Bulgaria	Decision	Klaus Rost	United Team of Germany

Points

Rank	Wrestler	Nation	Points
1st place, gold medalist(s)	Enyu Valchev	Bulgaria	1
2nd place, silver medalist(s)	Klaus Rost	United Team of Germany	3
