= Wrestling at the 1968 Summer Olympics – Men's Greco-Roman 70 kg =

Wrestling at the Olympics

Men's Greco-Roman 70 kg at the Games of the XIX Olympiad
- Venue: Insurgentes Ice Rink
- Dates: 23–26 October 1968
- Competitors: 26 from 26 nations

Medalists
1st place, gold medalist(s)		Muneji Munemura	Japan
2nd place, silver medalist(s)		Stevan Horvat	Yugoslavia
3rd place, bronze medalist(s)		Petros Galaktopoulos	Greece

The Men's Greco-Roman Lightweight at the 1968 Summer Olympics as part of the wrestling program were held at the Insurgentes Ice Rink. The weight class allowed wrestlers of up to 70 kilograms to compete.

== Results ==
The following wrestlers took part in the event:

Rank	Name	Country
1	Muneji Munemura	Japan
2	Stevan Horvat	Yugoslavia
3	Petros Galaktopoulos	Greece
4	Klaus Rost	West Germany
5	Eero Tapio	Finland
6T	Gennady Sapunov	Soviet Union
6T	Werner Holzer	United States
AC	Antal Steer	Hungary
AC	Vítězslav Mácha	Czechoslovakia
AC	Seo Hun-gyo	South Korea
AC	Klaus Pohl	East Germany
AC	Piero Bellotti	Italy
AC	Gord Garvie	Canada
AC	Jan Karlsson	Sweden
AC	Ion Enache	Romania
AC	Kurt Madsen	Denmark
AC	Guy Marchand	France
AC	António Galantinho	Portugal
AC	Kazım Ayvaz	Turkey
AC	Mahmoud El-Sherbini	Egypt
AC	Carlos Alberto Vario	Argentina
AC	Stoyan Apostolov	Bulgaria
AC	Mohamed Moukrim Ben Mansour	Morocco
AC	Ángel Aldana	Guatemala
AC	Mario Tovar	Mexico
AC	Eliseo Salugta	Philippines
