= 1971 World Wrestling Championships – Men's freestyle 74 kg =

Men's freestyle 74 kg at the 1971 World Championships
- Dates: 27 August 1971
- Competitors: 24 from 24 nations

Medalists
| gold medal | Yury Gusov | Soviet Union |
| silver medal | Mohammad Farhangdoust | Iran |
| bronze medal | Ludovic Ambruș | Romania |

The Men's Freestyle 74 kg at the 1971 World Wrestling Championships were held at the Vasil Levski National Stadium, Sofia.

== Tournament results ==
The competition used a form of negative points tournament, with negative points given for any result short of a fall. Accumulation of 6 negative points eliminated the wrestler. When only two or three wrestlers remain, a special final round is used to determine the order of the medals.

Legend

- TF — Won by Fall
- DQ — Won by Passivity or forfeit
- D2 — Both wrestlers lost by Passivity
- DNA — Did not appear

Penalties

- 0 — Won by Fall and Disqualification
- 0.5 — Won by Technical Superiority
- 1 — Won by Points
- 2 — Draw
- 2.5 — Draw, Passivity
- 3 — Lost by Points
- 3.5 — Lost by Technical Superiority
- 4 — Lost by Fall and Disqualification

=== 1st round ===
| TPP | MPP | | Score | | MPP | TPP |
|---|---|---|---|---|---|---|
| 3 | 3 | Djelasi (TUN) | | Anthony Shacklady (GBR) | 1 | 1 |
| 0 | 0 | Mehmet Uzun (TUR) | TF | Kolton (ISR) | 4 | 4 |
| 3 | 3 | Janusz Pająk (POL) | | Ludovic Ambruș (ROM) | 1 | 1 |
| 0 | 0 | Adolf Seger (FRG) | TF | Symons (CAN) | 4 | 4 |
| 0 | 0 | Daniel Robin (FRA) | TF | Bernard Milhit (SUI) | 4 | 4 |
| 2 | 2 | Mohammad Farhangdoust (IRI) | Draw | Danzandarjaagiin Sereeter (MGL) | 2 | 2 |
| 2 | 2 | Francisco Lebeque (CUB) | Draw | Zun Gil Song (KOR) | 2 | 2 |
| 3 | 3 | Yosuke Nagano (JPN) | | Wolfgang Nitschke (GDR) | 1 | 1 |
| 3 | 3 | Michel Gallego (USA) | | Nikifor Kuzmanоv (BUL) | 1 | 1 |
| 4 | 4 | Josef Völc (TCH) | TF | Yury Gusov (URS) | 0 | 0 |
| 4 | 4 | Djemil (CYP) | TF | Gouassi (LBN) | 0 | 0 |
| 4 | 4 | Rossi (ITA) | TF | Károly Buzás (HUN) | 0 | 0 |

=== 2nd round ===
| TPP | MPP | | Score | | MPP | TPP |
|---|---|---|---|---|---|---|
| 7 | 4 | Djelasi (TUN) | TF | Mehmet Uzun (TUR) | 0 | 0 |
| 1 | 0 | Anthony Shacklady (GBR) | TF | Kolton (ISR) | 4 | 8 |
| 7 | 4 | Janusz Pająk (POL) | TF | Adolf Seger (FRG) | 0 | 0 |
| 1 | 0 | Ludovic Ambruș (ROM) | TF | Symons (CAN) | 4 | 8 |
| 2 | 0 | Mohammad Farhangdoust (IRI) | TF | Bernard Milhit (SUI) | 4 | 8 |
| 3 | 3 | Daniel Robin (FRA) | | Danzandarjaagiin Sereeter (MGL) | 1 | 3 |
| 2 | 0 | Francisco Lebeque (CUB) | TF | Rossi (ITA) | 4 | 8 |
| 8 | 4 | Josef Völc (TCH) | TF | Wolfgang Nitschke (GDR) | 0 | 1 |
| 4 | 4 | Gouassi (LBN) | TF | Nikifor Kuzmanоv (BUL) | 0 | 1 |
| 4 | 1 | Yosuke Nagano (JPN) | | Yury Gusov (URS) | 3 | 3 |
| 8 | 4 | Djemil (CYP) | TF | Michel Gallego (USA) | 0 | 3 |
| 6 | 4 | Zun Gil Song (KOR) | TF | Károly Buzás (HUN) | 0 | 0 |

=== 3rd round ===
| TPP | MPP | | Score | | MPP | TPP |
|---|---|---|---|---|---|---|
| 5 | 4 | Anthony Shacklady (GBR) | DQ | Mehmet Uzun (TUR) | 0 | 0 |
| 2 | 1 | Ludovic Ambruș (ROM) | | Adolf Seger (FRG) | 3 | 3 |
| 2 | 0 | Mohammad Farhangdoust (IRI) | TF | Daniel Robin (FRA) | 4 | 7 |
| 7 | 3 | Yosuke Nagano (JPN) | | Danzandarjaagiin Sereeter (MGL) | 1 | 4 |
| 5 | 3 | Francisco Lebeque (CUB) | | Károly Buzás (HUN) | 1 | 1 |
| 6 | 3 | Michel Gallego (USA) | | Wolfgang Nitschke (GDR) | 1 | 2 |
| 4 | 4 | Gouassi (LBN) | Вye | | 0 | 1 |
| 4 | 3 | Nikifor Kuzmanоv (BUL) | | Yury Gusov (URS) | 1 | 4 |

=== 4th round ===
| TPP | MPP | | Score | | MPP | TPP |
|---|---|---|---|---|---|---|
| 8 | 4 | Gouassi (LBN) | TF | Mehmet Uzun (TUR) | 0 | 0 |
| 2 | 0 | Ludovic Ambruș (ROM) | DQ | Károly Buzás (HUN) | 4 | 5 |
| 5 | 3 | Mohammad Farhangdoust (IRI) | | Yury Gusov (URS) | 1 | 5 |
| 5 | 3 | Wolfgang Nitschke (GDR) | | Danzandarjaagiin Sereeter (MGL) | 1 | 5 |
| 8 | 3 | Francisco Lebeque (CUB) | | Adolf Seger (FRG) | 1 | 4 |
| 4 | 0 | Nikifor Kuzmanоv (BUL) | Вye | | | |

=== 5th round ===
| TPP | MPP | | Score | | MPP | TPP |
|---|---|---|---|---|---|---|
| 5 | 1 | Nikifor Kuzmanоv (BUL) | | Mehmet Uzun (TUR) | 3 | 3 |
| 5 | 3 | Ludovic Ambruș (ROM) | | Danzandarjaagiin Sereeter (MGL) | 1 | 6 |
| 5 | 0 | Mohammad Farhangdoust (IRI) | TF | Adolf Seger (FRG) | 4 | 8 |
| 9 | 4 | Wolfgang Nitschke (GDR) | TF | Yury Gusov (URS) | 0 | 5 |

=== 6th round ===
| TPP | MPP | | Score | | MPP | TPP |
|---|---|---|---|---|---|---|
| 6 | 1 | Mohammad Farhangdoust (IRI) | | Mehmet Uzun (TUR) | 3 | 6 |
| 6 | 1 | Ludovic Ambruș (ROM) | | Nikifor Kuzmanоv (BUL) | 3 | 8 |
| 5 | 0 | Yury Gusov (URS) | Вye | | | |

=== Silver medal match ===
| TPP | MPP | | Score | | MPP | TPP |
|---|---|---|---|---|---|---|
| | 1 | Ludovic Ambruș (ROM) | | Mehmet Uzun (TUR) | 3 | |
| | 2 | Mohammad Farhangdoust (IRI) | Draw | Ludovic Ambruș (ROM) | 2 | |

== Final standings ==
Yury Gusov of USSR won the gold medal, despite losing to Japan's Yosuke Nagano, thanks to a lower number of penalty points in the overall standings. Mongolian wrestler Danzandarjaagiin Sereeter finished sixth without losing a single match. Mohammad Farhangdoust from Iran initially received bronze medal. In the final standings, a judging dispute downgraded his silver to bronze in favor of Ludovic Ambruş, however, the FILA (now UWW) officially corrected this to silver in 2011, recognizing Farhangdoust's rightful achievement.

1. Yury Gusov (URS)
2. Mohammad Farhangdoust (IRI)
3. Ludovic Ambruș (ROM)
4. Mehmet Uzun (TUR)
5. Nikifor Kuzmanov (BUL)
6. Danzandarjaagiin Sereeter (MGL)
