= Pakistan at the 1968 Summer Olympics =

- IOC code: PAK
- NOC: National Olympic Committee of Pakistan
- Website: www.nocpakistan.org

in Mexico City
- Flag bearer: Tariq Aziz
- Medals Ranked 29th: Gold 1 Silver 0 Bronze 0 Total 1

Summer Olympics appearances (overview)
- 1948; 1952; 1956; 1960; 1964; 1968; 1972; 1976; 1980; 1984; 1988; 1992; 1996; 2000; 2004; 2008; 2012; 2016; 2020; 2024

Pakistan competed at the 1968 Summer Olympics in Mexico City, Mexico. Pakistan took part in only two disciplines at the Olympiad. Their 20-member contingent included 18 hockey players and two wrestlers. The men's field hockey team became Olympic champions for the second time, having first won the gold medal in the men's field hockey competition at the 1960 Olympics.

== Medalists ==
- Gold won in the men's field hockey team competition.

Medals by sport
Sport	Gold	Silver	Bronze	Total
Field Hockey	1	0	0	1
Total	1	0	0	1

== Field hockey ==
=== Men's team competition ===
Group B

- Defeated Netherlands (6-0)
- Defeated France (1-0)
- Defeated Australia (3-2)
- Defeated Argentina (5-0)
- Defeated Great Britain (2-1)
- Defeated Malaysia (4-0)
- Defeated Kenya (2-1)

Semifinals

- West Germany (1-0) after extra time

Final

- Defeated Australia (2-1) for the gold medal.

=== Team roster ===
- Tariq Aziz (captain)
- Mohammad Asad Malik (vice-captain)
- Zakir Hussain (gk)
- Qazi Salahuddin (gk)
- Tanvir Dar
- Riazuddin
- Saeed Anwar
- Riaz Ahmed
- Gulraiz Akhtar
- Fazalur Rehman
- Anwar Shah
- Khalid Mahmood
- Mohammad Ashfaq
- Abdul Rasheed Jr
- Jahangir Butt
- Farooq Khan
- Laeeq Ahmed
- Tariq Niazi

== Freestyle Wrestling ==
Pakistan competed in Freestyle Wrestling at 1968 Summer Olympics. Those who competed include:

=== Men's bantamweight (up to 57kg) ===
- Sardar Muhammad
  - 1st round; Lost to Donald Behm (USA)
  - 2nd round; Beat Sukhbaatar Bazaryn (MGL)
  - 3rd round; Lost to Abutaleb Gorgori (IRN)

=== Men's lightweight (up to 70kg) ===
- Taj Mohammad
  - 1st round; Beat Stefanos Ioannidis (GRE)
  - 2nd round; Lost to Seyit Agrali (TUR)
  - 3rd round; Lost to Valtchev Enio (BUL) TKO
