= Danzandarjaagiin Sereeter =

Mongolian freestyle wrestler

Medal record

Men's freestyle wrestling

Representing Mongolia

Olympic Games
| Bronze medal – third place | 1968 Mexico | 70 kg |

World Championships
| Bronze medal – third place | 1970 Edmonton | 74 kg |

Asian Games
| Silver medal – second place | 1974 Tehran | 74 kg |

Tbilisi International Tournament
| Gold medal – first place | 1968 Tbilisi | 70 kg |

Dan Kolov & Nikola Petrov Tournament
| Gold medal – first place | 1968 Sofia | 70 kg |

Danzandarjaagiin Sereeter (Mongolian: Данзандаржаагийн Сэрээтэр; born April 23, 1943) is a retired Mongolian wrestler. Sereeter was born in Lün sum, Töv Province. The 1968 Olympic and 1970 World Championships bronze medalist, holder of the State Hawk title in the mongolian traditional wrestling. The undefeated 1971 World Championships wrestler.

Sereeter wrestled for the Mongolian national team from 1962 to 1973. He was the Mongolian national champion from 1963 to 1969.

In 1964, during the USSR vs. Mongolia dual meet, Sereeter wrestled to the draw against reigning USSR national champion Elkan Tedeev.

He competed at the 1964 Olympics in the men's freestyle lightweight category.

He won the gold medal at the 1965 Socialist Bloc military championship, by defeating Bulgaria′s Dimitrov in the final.

Sereeter took the 1968 Tbilisi International Tournament in USSR at the 70 kg event, defeating 1964 Olympic medalist and two-time Tbilisi International Tournament champion Nodar Khokhashvili by fall in the final.

He won the gold medal in the 70 kg event at the 1968 Dan Kolov & Nikola Petrov Tournament, wrestled to the draw against сurrent Olympic, World, and European champion Enyu Valchev in the final.

At the 1968 Summer Olympics he won the bronze medal in the men's freestyle lightweight category.

In 1968, he was inducted as the Honored Athlete of Mongolia.

At the 1970 World Championships Sereeter received the bronze medal in the men's Freestyle 74 kg.

At the 1971 World Championships he earned the sixth place in the men's freestyle 74 kg according to the negative points system, with the draw against World Championships silver medalist Mohammad Farhangdoust and wins over 1968 Olympic medalist and 1967 World champion Daniel Robin, Yosuke Nagano who had previously beaten eventual World champion Yury Gusov in the second round of this tournament, 1969 European Championships silver medalist Wolfgang Nitschke, and 1971 World Championships bronze medalist Ludovic Ambruș, leaving the tournament undefeated.

He competed at the 1972 Olympics in the men's freestyle 74 kg.

At the 1974 Asian Games Sereeter received the silver medal in the men's freestyle 74 kg.

He participated periodically in the congresses of the Mongolian Wrestling Federation, dedicated to the problems of developing Olympic wrestling in the country, together with the best Mongolian wrestlers of the next generation, such as Ganzorigiin Mandakhnaran, Erdenebatyn Bekhbayar, Pürevjavyn Önörbat, Tömör-Ochiryn Tulga and so on.

On 2 Februar 2026, he was inducted as the Hero of Labour of Mongolia.
