= Gurbaksh Singh (disambiguation) =

Gurbaksh Singh was an Indian novelist and short story writer.

Gurbaksh Singh may also refer to:

- Gurbaksh Singh Kanhaiya (1759 – 1785), father-in-law of Ranjit Singh founder of the Sikh Empire
- Gurbaksh Singh Khalsa (1965 – 2018), Indian Sikh civil rights activist
- Maj Gen Gurbakhsh Singh, DSO, OBE (1904 - 1979), Indian army officer
- Gurbakshish Singh (1911 – 1983), Indian politician from Punjab
- Gurbaksh Singh Dhillon (1914 - 2006), officer in the Indian National Army
- Gurbux Singh (field hockey, born 1935), former field hockey player from India
- Gurbax Singh Grewal (field hockey, born 1942), former field hockey player from India
- Gurbaksh Singh Chahal, Indian-American businessman
- Gurbaksh Singh Sandhu, Indian boxing coach
- Baba Gurbaksh Singh Sikh warrior
