= Gurbax Singh Grewal (field hockey, born 1942) =

Indian field hockey player (1942–2026)

Personal information
- Nickname: Gurbax Singh (Railways)
- Nationality: (United Kingdom) British Indian (1942-1947) (India) Indian (1947-2026)
- Born: 1 April 1942 Lyallpur, Punjab, British India
- Died: 24 April 2026 (aged 84) Zirakpur, Punjab, India

Sport
- Sport: Field hockey
- Position: Forward
- Event: Men's team
Medal record
Men's field hockey
Representing India
Olympic Games
Bronze medal – third place	1968 Mexico City	Team

Gurbax Singh Grewal (1 April 1942 – 24 April 2026) was an Indian field hockey player who was part of the bronze medal-winning squad at the 1968 Mexico City Olympics.

== Name and identity ==
Spelling of Gurbax's first name are also written as Gurbux and Gurbaksh. Because another player named Gurbux was on the Indian hockey team at the 1968 Summer Olympics, he changed the spelling of his name to 'Gurbax' to differentiate himself.

== Early life ==
Born in Lyallpur (now Faisalabad in Pakistan) in undivided India, Gurbax grew up in Sansarpur, Punjab, where his family relocated after Partition due to his father's service in the Army. He moved to Mumbai in his early 20s to actively pursue his hockey career.

== Career ==
Gurbax was a speedy forward who was a member of the India hockey team at the 1968 Mexico City Olympics. At the Games, he made with his younger brother, Balbir Singh Grewal, another instance of two brothers in the India hockey team together at the same Olympic tournament.

Domestically, Gurbax represented Western Railways, where he built a distinguished career both on and off the field. Following his retirement as a Sports Officer with Western Railways, he remained deeply involved in the sport's development. He served as the Director of Sports at Khalsa College, Mumbai, coached multiple Mumbai teams for numerous years, and later served as the Honorary Secretary of the Mumbai Hockey Association (now Hockey Mumbai).

== Death ==
Gurbax died from a heart attack at his residence in Zirakpur—a town near Chandigarh—on 24 April 2026 at the age of 84. On the day of his passing, he visited the house of his brother, Balbir Singh Grewal, who dropped him back home. Shortly after returning, Balbir received a call informing him that his brother had died. Gurbax's last rites were performed on 25 April 2026 in Zirakpur.

== Tributes ==
Expressing his condolences, Hockey India President Dilip Tirkey said that the Indian hockey fraternity was deeply saddened by the passing of Gurbax Singh Grewal ji.

Hockey India Secretary General Shri Bhola Nath Singh stated that Gurbax Singh Grewal ji's achievements as a player and his contributions as an administrator had left a lasting impact on Indian hockey.

For three-time Olympian Harbinder Singh, the loss was deeply personal, noting that their friendship dated back to childhood in Sansarpur after Partition, where they began careers that led to the Olympic podium.

Former 1980 Olympic captain Vasudevan Baskaran shared strong memories of Gurbax, referring to him as his first coach upon joining Indian Railways in 1974.

Pramod Batlaw, who represented India in the 1978 Men's Hockey World Cup, encapsulated the widespread reverence Gurbax commanded.

Charles Cornelius, an Olympic bronze and World Cup silver medalist, termed Gurbax a very good player and a good friend, recalling their many domestic battles playing for Punjab Police against Gurbax's Western Railways side.

Former international player Mir Ranjan Negi wrote that with a heavy heart and eyes full of gratitude, he bowed before the towering legacy of Olympian Sardar [Gurbax] Singh ji.
