= Thole =

Thole is a surname. Notable people with the surname include:

- Josh Thole (born 1986), American baseball player
- Julius Thole (born 1997), German beach volleyball player
- Kik Thole (born 1944), Dutch field hockey player
- Karel Thole (1914–2000), Dutch-Italian painter and illustrator
