= Hockey at the 1968 Olympics =

Hockey at the 1968 Olympics may refer to:

- Ice hockey at the 1968 Winter Olympics
- Field hockey at the 1968 Summer Olympics
