= MWF =

MWF may refer to:

- Maharlika Wealth Fund, sovereign wealth fund in the Philippines
- Marvin, Welch & Farrar, 1970 pop group
- Mauritian Wildlife Foundation, non-profit conservation agency based in Mauritius
- Medical Women's Federation, body representing woman doctors in the United Kingdom
- Millennium Wrestling Federation in New England, U.S.
- Minhaj Welfare Foundation, international relief/aid organisation
- Mongolian Wrestling Federation, a sport organization in Ulaanbaatar, Mongolia
- Murrinh-patha language, ISO 639-3 code for an Australian aboriginal language
- HAL Tejas Mk2, commonly referred to as MWF (Medium Weight Fighter)
