= Mahmoud El-Sherbini =

Egyptian wrestler

Personal information
- Nationality: Egyptian
- Born: 24 September 1937 (age 88) Cairo, Egypt

Sport
- Sport: Wrestling

Mahmoud El-Sherbini (born 24 September 1937) is an Egyptian wrestler. He competed in the men's Greco-Roman 70 kg at the 1968 Summer Olympics.
