= Israel Vargas =

Mexican wrestler

Personal information
- Born: 17 January 1946 (age 80) Veracruz, Mexico

Sport
- Sport: Wrestling

Israel Vargas (born 17 January 1946) is a Mexican wrestler. He competed in the men's freestyle 70 kg at the 1968 Summer Olympics.
