= Arthur Busch =

Australian field hockey player

Personal information
- Born: 8 March 1944 (age 82) Ipswich, Queensland, Australia

Sport
- Sport: Field hockey
Medal record
Men's field hockey
Representing Australia
Olympic Games
Silver medal – second place	1968 Mexico City	Team competition

Arthur William Busch (born 8 March 1944 in Ipswich, Queensland) is a retired field hockey player from Australia, who won the silver medal with the men's national team at the 1968 Summer Olympics in Mexico City. Busch and his teammates defeated India in the semi-final but lost to Pakistan in the final game. Busch was also a member of the Australian national team that participated in an international field hockey tournament in Pakistan in March 1969. He was the goalkeeper in an international match in August 1969 between Australia and New Zealand. New Zealand, which had finished seventh in the 1968 Olympics, won by a score of 2–1.

Busch attended Ipswich Grammar School. Busch was Ipswich Hockey's Australian representative from 1967 to 1973.
