= Janusz Pająk =

Polish wrestler

Personal information
- Nationality: Polish
- Born: 19 February 1944 (age 82) Garwolin, Poland

Sport
- Sport: Wrestling

Janusz Pająk (born 19 February 1944) is a Polish wrestler. He competed in the men's freestyle 70 kg at the 1968 Summer Olympics.
