= Muneji Munemura =

Japanese wrestler (born 1943)

Medal record

Representing Japan

Men's Greco-Roman wrestling

Olympic Games
Gold medal – first place	1968 Mexico City	Lightweight

Muneji Munemura (宗村 宗二, Munemura Muneji) (born October 1, 1943) is a Japanese wrestler and Olympic champion in Greco-Roman wrestling.

== Career ==
He finished fourth both at the 1965 and 1966 World Wrestling Championships.

Munemura competed at the 1968 Summer Olympics in Mexico City where he received a gold medal in Greco-Roman wrestling, the lightweight class.
