= Gurbakhsh Singh =

Indian Army Major General, DSO, OBE

Major General Gurbakhsh Singh DSO, OBE
- Born: Gurbaksh Singh Madahar; 1904; Badhni Kalan, Moga, Punjab Province, British India
- Died: 11 December 1979 (aged 74–75)
- Other name: G. S. Madahar
- Education: Khalsa College, Amritsar
- Relatives: Lt Gen. Harbaksh Singh, VrC (brother)
- Military career
- Allegiance: British India; India
- Rank: Major General
- Commands: Jind Infantry, Indian State Forces; Patiala Brigade, PEPSU forces Unknown Infantry Brigade under 26 Infantry Division, Jammu and Kashmir state Indian Custodian Force, Korea
- Conflicts: World War II; Battle of Singapore; Korean War
- Awards: Padma Shri; Distinguished Service Order; Most Excellent Order of the British Empire

Major General Gurbakhsh Singh, DSO, OBE (1904 - 11 December 1979), also spelled as 'Gurbaksh Singh', was a general officer who served in the British Indian Army and later the Indian Army. He is known for his leadership of his battalion of the British Indian Army under the gruelling captivity of the Japanese forces in Singapore for three years. Later, he served with the Indian Custodian Force in Korea following the Korean War.

== Early life ==
Gurbaksh Singh was born in a wealthy Madahar Jatt Sikh family, in the village of Badrukhan in the princely state of Jind, in British India. His father, Harnam Singh, was a doctor who had studied at the Medical College in Lahore.

In the Introduction to Gurbaksh Singh's autobiography, Sardar Surjit Singh Majithia writes that Gurbaksh Singh studied at the Khalsa College, Amritsar, from where he got a commission in the Jind state army. He joined the Jind State Forces as a cadet on April 1, 1923, and got commissioned as an officer on December 15, 1923.

His younger brother, Harbaksh Singh, joined the British Indian army.

Singh was married twice, his second wife being Sudesh Gurbaksh Singh.

== World War II ==
During World War II, in the rank of Lieutenant Colonel, Singh commanded a battalion of the Jind Infantry of the Indian States Forces in Singapore, when the British forces surrendered to the invading Japanese. For three years, he and his battalion were prisoners of war for the Japanese. But he refused to defect and join the Indian National Army, and coaxed his soldiers from doing so too. With the turning of the tide and the defeat of the Japanese, Singh brought his battalion back to India. For his 'leadership of his battalion under extreme adversity' during captivity, he was awarded the Distinguished Service Order and the Order of the British Empire.

In 1947, he was appointed as Commandant of the Jind State Forces, and promoted to the rank of brigadier.

== Post-Independence ==
In 1948, following the merger of the Jind State Forces with the PEPSU forces, he was appointed as the Commander of the Patiala Brigade. After the integration of the PEPSU force with the Indian Army, he was given the command of an Infantry Brigade. In 1953, he commanded an Infantry Brigade in Jammu and Kashmir.

In 1953, Singh was appointed as deputy commander to the Custodian Force of India in Korea - responsible for the repatriation of prisoners of war from the Korean War - by the force's leader Maj-Gen S.P.P. Thorat. He served in this capacity from August 1953 till March 1954. Later in 1954, he took the command of the East Punjab Area and was promoted to major general.

In 1957, he was awarded the Padma Shri by the Government of India.

He retired from the Indian Army with the rank of Major General on 5 February 1958.

While he appears to have prepared a draft of his autobiography in 1978, it was completed and published by his wife Sudesh Gurbaksh Singh in 2013.

== See also ==
- Others with the name Gurbaksh Singh.
