= Arto Savolainen =

Finnish wrestler

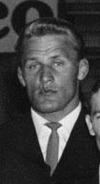
- Arto Savolainen in 1965.

Personal information
- Nationality: Finnish
- Born: 3 February 1941 (age 85) Oulu, Finland

Sport
- Sport: Wrestling

Arto Savolainen (born 3 February 1941) is a Finnish wrestler. He competed in the men's freestyle lightweight at the 1964 Summer Olympics.
