= Fred Quine =

Australian field hockey player

Personal information
- Born: 3 January 1941 (age 85)
Medal record
Men's field hockey
Representing Australia
Olympic Games
Silver medal – second place	1968 Mexico City	Team competition

Frederick Quine (born 4 January 1941) is an Australian retired field hockey player who won the silver medal with the men's national field hockey team at the 1968 Summer Olympics in Mexico City, Mexico.

== Early life ==
Quine was born in Brisbane, Queensland, Australia, and attended Brisbane State High School. He commenced his hockey career playing grade hockey for the Northern Suburbs Hockey Club. He was named a "life member" of the club following his appearance in the Olympics in 1969.

== Playing career ==
Quine first played for the national team in 1961. When he was selected for the Olympic squad, he had not played for Australia in six years. His team advanced to the gold medal match after defeating India in the semi-finals, before losing 1–2 to Pakistan to finish with the silver.

In 2017, Quine was named to the Hockey Queensland Hall of Fame.
