= António Galantinho =

Portuguese wrestler

Personal information
- Nationality: Portuguese
- Born: 14 May 1946 (age 80) Torres Vedras, Portugal

Sport
- Sport: Wrestling

António Galantinho (born 14 May 1946) is a Portuguese wrestler. He competed in the men's Greco-Roman 70 kg at the 1968 Summer Olympics.
