= Károly Buzás =

Hungarian wrestler

Personal information
- Nationality: Hungarian
- Born: 26 February 1945 (age 81) Monor, Hungary

Sport
- Sport: Wrestling

Károly Buzás (born 26 February 1945) is a Hungarian wrestler. He competed in the men's freestyle 70 kg at the 1968 Summer Olympics.
