= Chung Dong-goo =

South Korean wrestler (born 1942)

Personal information
- Nationality: South Korean
- Born: 20 March 1942 (age 84)

Sport
- Sport: Wrestling

Chung Dong-goo (born 20 March 1942) is a South Korean wrestler. He competed in the men's freestyle lightweight at the 1964 Summer Olympics.
