= Gregory Ruth =

American wrestler (1939–1974)

Personal information
- Born: August 9, 1939 Bethlehem, Pennsylvania, U.S.
- Died: June 30, 1974 (aged 34) Waco, Texas, U.S.

Sport
- Country: United States
- Sport: Wrestling
- Events: Freestyle and Folkstyle
- Club: New York Athletic Club
- Team: USA
Medal record
Men's freestyle wrestling
Representing the United States
World Championships
Bronze medal – third place	1963 Sofia	70 kg
Pan American Games
Gold medal – first place	1963 São Paulo	70 kg
Collegiate Wrestling
Representing the Oklahoma Sooners
NCAA Division I Championships
Gold medal – first place	1965 Laramie	167 lb
Gold medal – first place	1966 Ames	160 lb

Gregory Ruth (August 9, 1939 – June 30, 1974) was an American wrestler. He competed in the men's freestyle lightweight at the 1964 Summer Olympics. He wrestled collegiately at the University of Oklahoma, where he was a two-time NCAA champion. Ruth was killed in a powerboat racing accident on June 30, 1974, in Waco, Texas. He was buried at Sunset Memorial Park in Norman, Oklahoma.
