= Dewan Ranjit Rai =

Indian soldier, recipient of Maha Vir Chakra

Lieutenant Colonel Dewan Ranjit Rai MVC
- Born: 6 February 1913; Gujranwala, Punjab Province (now Punjab, Pakistan)
- Died: 27 October 1947 (aged 34); Baramulla, Jammu and Kashmir, Dominion of India
- Military career
- Allegiance: British Raj; India
- Branch: British Indian Army; Indian Army
- Service years: 1935–1947
- Rank: Lieutenant Colonel
- Service number: IC-12
- Unit: 1 Sikh
- Conflicts: World War II; Indo-Pakistani War of 1947
- Awards: Maha Vir Chakra

Lieutenant Colonel Dewan Ranjit Rai, MVC (1913–1947) was an Indian Army officer who played a key role during the Indo-Pakistani War of 1947. As the commanding officer of the 1st battalion, The Sikh Regiment (1 Sikh), he was the first recipient of the Maha Vir Chakra, which was awarded posthumously.

1 Sikh was the first unit to be inducted into the war, when it was airlifted from Gurgaon to Srinagar on 27 October 1947. This day is celebrated as the Infantry Day by the Indian Army. Under the command of Rai, the battalion played a key role in saving the valley of Kashmir from the invaders.

== Early life ==
Rai was born in Gujranwala in a Punjabi Khatri family on 6 February 1913. He studied at the Bishop Cotton School, Shimla. He attended the first course at the Indian Military Academy, Dehradun. Later, he was among the first Indian officers to be posted to Command and Staff College, Quetta as an instructor.

== Military career ==
Rai was commissioned on 1 February 1935 with the officer service number IC-12. On commissioning, he was attached for a year to a British Army regiment, the King's Shropshire Light Infantry stationed in India. He was appointed to the British Indian Army and posted to the 5th battalion, 11th Sikh Regiment on 24 February 1936. He was promoted lieutenant on 4 May 1936 He was promoted captain on 4 February 1942 and by April 1944, he was serving as a temporary major on the Recruiting Staff. He was selected for posting as a military attaché at Washington, D.C. just before the break out of the Indo-Pakistani War of 1947, but this assignment was changed when he was selected for this mission to Kashmir.

He was commanding the 1st battalion of the Sikh Regiment in Gurgaon, making arrangements for refugees, when Pakistan invaded Jammu and Kashmir. Two companies of his troops were airlifted in 30 Dakota aircraft, one of which was flown by Biju Patnaik (later Chief Minister of Odisha), to Srinagar. The Operation's Order was handed over to him by then Captain S K Sinha, who retired as a lieutenant general and was later Governor of Jammu and Kashmir.

Rai led his troops to defend the Baramulla-Srinagar highway near Pattan against the numerically superior Pakistani tribal irregulars who were moving towards Srinagar after looting, raping and burning people of all religions in Baramulla. He successfully protected the Srinagar airfield, paving the way for more Indian troops to land who expelled the Pakistani tribal irregulars. He died on 27 October 1947 leading his men and defending Pattan. He was the first officer of the Indian Army after independence to fight a battle on 27 October 1947.

== Maha Vir Chakra ==
Rai was honoured with a Maha Vir Chakra. He was the first recipient of the award.

The citation for the Maha Vir Chakra reads as follows:

Gazette Notification: 2 Pres 50, 26.1.50

Operation: 1947 Indo Pak Kashmir War Date of Award: 27 Oct 1947

CITATION

LIEUTENANT COLONEL DEWAN RANJIT RAI (POSTHUMOUS)

(IC-12) 1 Bn. THE SIKH REGIMENT

Lieutenant Colonel Dewan Ranjit Rai was the Commanding Officer of 1 Sikh. Immediately on landing at Srinagar, on 27 October 1947, he appreciated that it was imperative to hold and oppose the raiders as far away as possible from the vital city of Srinagar and its adjacent airfield.

As very little time was at his disposal, he personally conducted reconnaissance and operations at such personal risk that he was eventually killed. By his complete disregard of personal danger and his determined and inspired leadership, the raiders were stopped sufficiently far away to enable a build-up for the eventual decisive defeat.

The officer gave his life in a successful endeavour to save Srinagar by displaying courage of the highest order.

== See also ==
- Harbaksh Singh
