= Badrukhan =

Badrukha
- village
- Location in Punjab, India Badrukha (India)
- Coordinates: 30.252319°N 75.791675°E
- Country: India
- State: Punjab
- District: Sangrur

Government
  - Body: Gram panchayat

Languages
  - Official: Punjabi
- Time zone: UTC+5:30 (IST)

Badrukhan is a big village about 5 km from Sangrur, the district headquarters, on Sangrur-Barnala road in Punjab, India.

== History ==
The residents of five small villages, Vada Agwarh, Vichla Agwarh, Dalamwal, Dhaliwas and Thagan wali Patti, under the leadership of Pandit Badru, approached Great Jat ruler Maharaja Gajpat Singh, the Maharaja of Jind, for security from dacoits. Maharaja Gajpat Singh amalgamated these villages and named it Badrukhan. In 1763, when Gajpat Singh captured the town of Jind, Badrukhan was made the capital of Jind State. He also built a fort here.

== Present ==
The village has a Government Senior Secondary school, a 4-bedded subsidiary health center and a post office.

== Notable people ==
- Lt. Gen. Harbaksh Singh, Padma Vibhushan, Padma Bhushan and Vir Chakra
- Maj. Gen. Gurbakhsh Singh, DSO, OBE
- Pandit Durga Das Bhardwaj, revenue minister of Jind State
- Amaranth Patwari (Kaka Patwari)
- Tarsem Chand Bhardwaj, Manager, Punjab Agro
- Dr Vikram Bhardwaj, doctor of ear, nose, throat and cancer surgery in Delhi.
