= 1968 Dan Kolov & Nikola Petrov Tournament =

Dan Kolov & Nikola Petrov 1968
- Host city: Sevlievo, Bulgaria
- Dates: 19–22 April

Champions
- Freestyle: Bulgaria
- Greco-Roman: Bulgaria

The 7th Dan Kolov & Nikola Petrov Tournament was a sport wrestling event held in Sevlievo, Bulgaria between 19 and 22 April 1968.

This international tournament includes competition in men's Freestyle and Greco-Roman wrestling. The tournament is held in honor of Dan Kolov who was the first European freestyle wrestling champion from Bulgaria and European and World Champion Nikola Petroff. 96 athletes from 12 countries participated in the Freestyle wrestling competition, while 87 athletes from 11 countries took part in the Greco-Roman event.

== Medal overview ==
=== Freestyle ===
Event	Gold	Silver	Bronze
Flyweight; 52 kg	Нarasari; Iran	Kurbani; Iran	Asisow; Bulgaria
Bantamweight; 57 kg	Patrikow; Bulgaria	Leоnоw; Bulgaria	Sukhbaatar; Mongolia
Featherweight; 63 kg	Todorow; Bulgaria	Кhrister; Bulgaria	Marinko; Yugoslavia
Lightweight; 70 kg	Danzandarjaagiin Sereeter; Mongolia	Enyu Valchev; Bulgaria	Wenglischki; Soviet Union
Welterweight; 78 kg	Hakuki; Iran	Broikow; Bulgaria	Коlewjew; Soviet Union
Middleweight; 87 kg	Prodan Gardzhev; Bulgaria	Jigjidiin Mönkhbat; Mongolia	Papaschwili; Soviet Union
Light heavyweight 97 kg	Said Mustafov; Bulgaria	Todorow; Bulgaria	Tschedow; Bulgaria
Heavyweight +97 kg	Osman Duraliev; Bulgaria	Wasiliew; Bulgaria	

Overall team standings:

1. Bulgaria (44 points).

2. Iran (18 points).

3. Mongol (15.5 points).

4. USSR (8 points).

5. Hungary (5.5 points).

=== Greco-Roman ===
Event	Gold	Silver	Bronze
Flyweight; 52 kg	Кirow; Bulgaria	Маssajew; Soviet Union	Maco; Czechoslovakia
Bantamweight; 57 kg	Varga; Hungary	Alionescu; Romania	Traikow; Bulgaria
Featherweight; 63 kg	Grigoriew; Soviet Union	Galintschew; Bulgaria	Nedelschew; Bulgaria
Lightweight; 70 kg	Raitschew; Bulgaria Pohl; East Germany		Tapio; Finland
Welterweight; 78 kg	Zarew; Bulgaria	Dorosiew; Bulgaria	Abduljajiew; Soviet Union
Middleweight; 87 kg	Krumow; Bulgaria	Коrmarniк; Czechoslovakia	Neruts; Romania
Light heavyweight 97 kg	Orlownik; Poland	Ladsarow; Bulgaria	Коllew; Bulgaria
Heavyweight +97 kg	Donew; Bulgaria	Кment; Bulgaria	Petrow; Bulgaria

Overall team standings:

1. Bulgaria (43 points).

2. USSR (18 points).

3. East Germany (16 points).
