= Seo Hun-gyo =

South Korean wrestler

Personal information
- Nationality: South Korean
- Born: 16 June 1944 (age 82) Busan, South Korea

Sport
- Sport: Wrestling

Seo Hun-gyo (born 16 June 1944) is a South Korean wrestler. He competed in the men's Greco-Roman 70 kg at the 1968 Summer Olympics.
