= Muhammad Yaghoub =

Pakistani wrestler (born 1947)

Personal information
- Nationality: Pakistani
- Born: 10 January 1947 (age 79)

Sport
- Sport: Wrestling

Muhammad Yaghoub (born 10 January 1947) is a Pakistani wrestler. He competed in the men's freestyle 74 kg at the 1972 Summer Olympics.
