= Piero Bellotti =

Italian wrestler (1942–2022)

Personal information
- Nationality: Italian
- Born: 1 August 1942 Turin, Italy
- Died: 10 February 2022 (aged 79)

Sport
- Sport: Wrestling

Piero Bellotti (1 August 1942 – 10 February 2022) was an Italian wrestler. He competed in the men's Greco-Roman 70 kg at the 1968 Summer Olympics.
