= Rodger Doner =

Canadian wrestler (1938–2022)

Personal information
- Born: 12 July 1938 Kirkland Lake, Ontario, Canada
- Died: 4 August 2022 (aged 84) Brockville, Ontario, Canada

Sport
- Sport: Wrestling

Rodger Doner (12 July 1938 – 4 August 2022) was a Canadian wrestler. He competed in the men's freestyle lightweight at the 1964 Summer Olympics.
