= Tham Kook Chin =

Malaysian wrestler

Personal information
- Nationality: Malaysian
- Born: 7 November 1943 (age 82)

Sport
- Sport: Wrestling

Tham Kook Chin (born 7 November 1943) is a Malaysian wrestler. He competed in the men's freestyle lightweight at the 1964 Summer Olympics.
