= Miklós Urbanovics =

Hungarian wrestler

Personal information
- Nationality: Hungarian
- Born: 28 February 1942 (age 84) Debrecen, Hungary

Sport
- Sport: Wrestling

Miklós Urbanovics (born 28 February 1942) is a Hungarian wrestler. He competed in the men's freestyle 74 kg at the 1972 Summer Olympics.
