= Harbaksh Singh =

Recipient of Vir Chakra

Lieutenant General Harbaksh Singh VrC
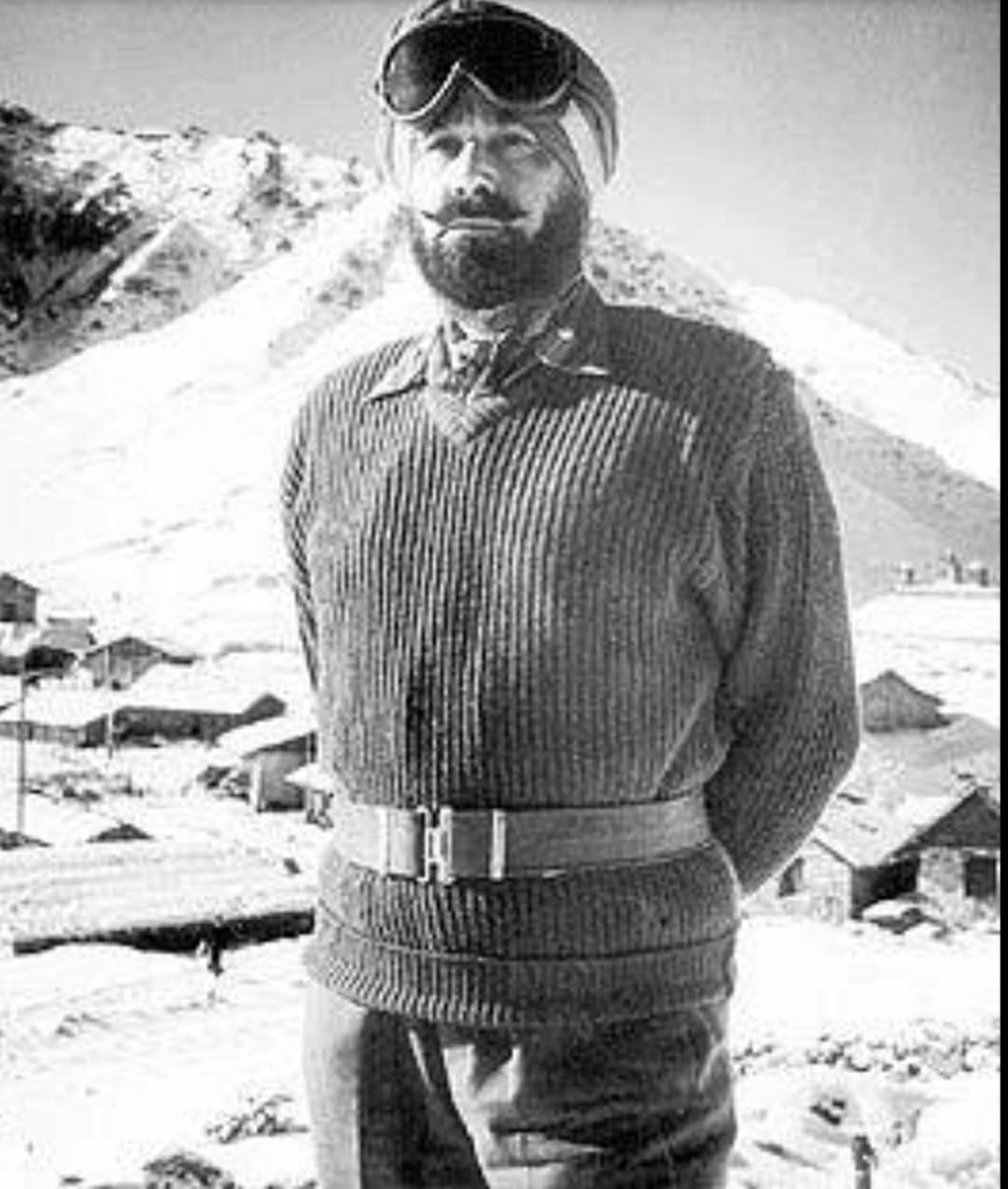
- Born: Harbaksh Singh Madahar; 1 October 1913; Badrukhan, Jind State in Punjab Province, British India
- Died: 14 November 1999 (aged 86); New Delhi, India
- Other name: H. S. Madahar
- Education: Indian Military Academy; Government College, Lahore
- Spouse: Sanam Madahar
- Relatives: Maj. Gen. Gurbakhsh Singh, DSO, OBE (brother)
- Military career
- Allegiance: British India (1935–1947); India (1947–1969)
- Branch: British Indian Army (1935–1947); Indian Army (1947–1969)
- Service years: 1935–1969
- Rank: Lieutenant General
- Service number: IC-31
- Unit: 5 Sikh
- Commands: Western Command; XXXIII Corps; IV Corps; 5 Infantry Division; 27 Infantry Division; 163 Infantry Brigade; 1 Sikh
- Conflicts: Second World War; Malayan Campaign; India–Pakistan war of 1947–1948; Battle of Tithwal; Battle of Chunj; Sino-Indian War; India–Pakistan war of 1965; Battle of Asal Uttar; Battle of Phillora; Battle of Chawinda
- Awards: Padma Vibhushan; Padma Bhushan; Vir Chakra

Lieutenant General Harbaksh Singh, VrC (1 October 1913 – 14 November 1999) was a highly decorated senior general officer in the Indian Military. As the commander of the Western Command, Singh commanded the Indian Army and played a key role during the India–Pakistan war of 1965. For his role in the war, he was awarded the Padma Vibhushan in 1966.

== Early life and education ==
Harbaksh Singh was born on 1 October 1913 in a wealthy Madahar Jat Sikh family, the youngest of seven siblings, in Badrukhan village near Sangrur, the capital of the Jind State. His father, Dr Harnam Singh Madahar, was the first person from the village to become a doctor. Dr Madahar joined the Jind Infantry and participated in the Tirah campaign in 1897–98. He later served in the East African campaign during World War I. The Jind Infantry later was amalgamated into the Indian Army in 1952, into the Punjab Regiment. Harbaksh attended the Ranbir High School in Sangrur before joining the Government College, Lahore. Always good at sports, Singh was a part of the college hockey team. As a citizen of a princely state, he had to take the permission of the Governor of Punjab, Sir Geoffrey Montmorency to sit for the entrance examinations and enrol into the Indian Military Academy (IMA), which had been set up the previous year. In March 1933, Singh arrived at Dehradun and joined the IMA.

== Military career ==
Singh was commissioned on 15 July 1935 and started his career with a year's post-commission attachment with the 2nd battalion, Argyll and Sutherland Highlanders, then stationed at Rawalpindi. It was standard practice for newly commissioned Indian officers to be initially attached to a British regiment before being sent to an Indian unit. He saw service on the North West Frontier during the Mohmand campaign of 1935. After a year's attachment with the Highlanders, Singh joined the 5th battalion, 11th Sikh Regiment (previously 47th Sikhs) at Aurangabad, on 19 August 1936. By 1937, Singh was commanding a signal platoon, in the headquarter company of the battalion. In September 1938, the battalion, under the command of Lieutenant Colonel Charles Ford moved to Razmak in the North-West Frontier Province (NWFP). Singh took over command of Alpha company of the battalion at Razmak.

=== World War II ===
In April 1939, the battalion received orders to move out of Razmak and prepare to move abroad, the final destination was not known. Moving to Quetta by road, via Bannu, the battalion made its way to Madras on a special troops train. Embarking on passenger ship, they made their way to British Malaya, reaching Singapore after a few days. They then moved to the town of Ipoh, which was their interim station, before reaching Kuantan.

During the withdrawal from Kuantan on 5 January 1942, Singh drove into a Japanese ambush and was seriously injured. He was evacuated to Alexandra Hospital in Singapore where he remained until the Fall of Singapore.

==== Prisoner of war ====
Harbaksh Singh was taken prisoner of war (POW) in Singapore on 15 February 1942. He was among the POWs in attendance at the Farrer Park address by Gen Mohan Singh of the First Indian National Army. Singh was to be moved to the island of Rabaul, but the ship never turned up. He was subsequently slated to be sent to the Death Railway but was sent to the Kluang airfield and handed over to the Imperial Japanese Army Air Service instead. His brother, Lt Col Gurbakhsh Singh and his battalion of the Jind Infantry was with him in the same camp. Singh spent the remaining years of the war as a POW in the Kluang camp. He suffered from a bad bout of typhoid as well as a bad case of beriberi, a disease he carried all his life. He was repatriated only in September 1945 after cessation of hostilities. He then recuperated at the military hospital in Ambala.

During the Indian National Army in Singapore between 1943 and 1945, his brother Lieutenant Colonel Gurbaksh Singh (not to be confused with INA officer Gurbaksh Singh Dhillon) became commander of the INA force housed at Tyersall Park, one of the seven INA military camps, constituted from the POWs of Jind State force, who were jats and other troops mainly from Haryana and Punjab.

By the end of year, Harbaksh Singh joined the Unit's Commanders' Course in Dehradun and in April 1945, was posted as the second-in-command of the 4th battalion, 11th Sikh Regiment (4/11 Sikh) at Campbellpur (now Attock). In February 1947, he was selected to join the first long course at Staff College, Quetta.

=== Post-Independence ===
After completing the Staff Course at the Staff College, he was posted as GSO-1 (operations and training), Eastern Command. In October 1947, when Lieutenant Colonel Dewan Ranjit Rai, the commanding officer of 1st battalion, Sikh Regiment (1 Sikh) was killed during the Kashmir operations in 1948, he volunteered to command the battalion. However, he was posted as deputy commander of the 161 Infantry Brigade. He conducted the main battle against the raiders at Shelatang Bridge on 7 November 1947. This decisive battle, involving 1st battalion Sikh Regiment and 4th battalion Kumaon Regiment, proved to be a turning point in the war.

On 12 December 1947, on hearing about the heavy casualties suffered by 1st battalion Sikh, he proceeded to Uri and took over the command of the battalion voluntarily, dropping a star from his rank. He brought back the battalion to Srinagar and began to rehabilitate it. However, even before the rehabilitation was complete, the battalion was called out to fight the enemy who had crossed the snow-clad Pharikian ki Gali and had occupied Handwara.

He led the truncated battalion, in a daring operations in which, after a series of battles, the battalion drove out the enemy from the valley.

In 1948, he was promoted to the rank of Brigadier and took over the command of 163 Infantry Brigade and began to advance to Tithwal. The movement forward started on 12 May 1948, and after six days, Tithwal was captured. Brigadier Harbaksh Singh was awarded a Vir Chakra for his bravery.

The citation for the Vir Chakra reads as follows:

Gazette Notification: 10 Pres 52,26-1-52

Operation: - Date of Award: 1948

CITATION

BRIGADIER HARBAKSH SINGH (IC 31)

COMMANDER 163 BRIGADE (1948)

In May 1948, Brigadier Harbaksh Singh, Commander 163 Brigade, was ordered to advance and capture Tithwal with a view to capturing the enemy's base from where he operated towards the Handwara valley and to cut his advance from Muzzaffarabad to Gurais. The tribesmen were then adopting guerrilla warfare to infiltrate the Kashmir Valley.

On the night of 16 May, Brigadier Harbaksh Singh, leading his troops on foot, made a rapid advance through a very difficult terrain, including the crossing of the 11,000-ft. Nastachur Pass, and completely surprised the enemy who broke and withdrew in confusion and panic in all directions. Tithwal was thus captured on 23 May. The success of the operations was to a very great extent due to his personal leadership.

During the subsequent consolidation at Tithwal, when the enemy concentrated a stronger force and brought heavy fire to bear with numerous counter-attacks, Brigadier Harbaksh Singh visited every position placing troops on the ground and was frequently under enemy fire. To keep himself in touch with Divisional HQ he made frequent trips on foot unmindful of the danger of being ambushed as the line of communication was still exposed to enemy infiltration.

During these operations, Brigadier Harbaksh Singh showed gallantry and courage of a very high order and his personal appearance in forward posts, without regard for personal safety, considerably cheered the defenders.

After the Kashmir operations, he went on to serve as the Deputy Commandant of the Indian Military Academy, at the western command headquarters, director of infantry at the Army headquarters, and in 1957 attended a course at the Imperial Defence College (now Royal College of Defence Studies) in the United Kingdom. In January 1959, he became the first foreign officer to go on attachment with German Army's first division to be raised after their disbandment at the end of World War II.

He returned to India to take over as General Officer Commanding (GOC) of the 27 Infantry Division, and later as GOC 5 Infantry Division. From July 1961 to October 1962, he was Chief of Staff at the Western Command headquarters.

When the Chinese invaded NEFA and Ladakh, he was moved from Shimla to take over the command of IV Corps. He later became GOC XXXIII Corps.

=== Indo–Pakistani War of 1965 ===
In 1964, he was promoted to Army Commander and took over as General Officer Commanding-in-Chief (GOC-in-C) of the Western Command whose area of responsibility spanned from Ladakh to Punjab. He led the Western Command successfully during victory against the Pakistan Army along the entire border in the India–Pakistan war of 1965.

Around 12 May 1965, Brigade Commander, Vijey Ghai in Kargil convened a conference at HQ. The agenda was not revealed but it started with him reading out the contents of Lt. Gen Harbaksh Singh GOC-in-C Western Command, DO (demi official note) to the forces. The Army Commander had reviewed recent skirmishes in Rann of Kutch and commented that the Pakistanis were continuing with their belligerent attitude and spoke about cultivating a more aggressive spirit in out troops. He also remarked pointedly “has the martial blood in the veins of the Indian Army soldiers dried up” or words to the similar effect. The operations that followed including the Taking of Point 13620 and Black Rocks was a major boost for the Indian forces. Per the official account of the War, this was the first counter-offensive undertaken by Indian troops in years. Its success had a good effect on the morale of the troops in Jammu and Kashmir, and in the Army as a whole. Politically it bolstered the image of the country. The leadership of Lt Gen Harbaksh Singh had played a key role in boosting the morale of a defeated army turning it into a striking force within just three years of the Chinese encounter thereby ensuring a memorable victory in the 1965 war.

After serving as General-Officer-Commanding-in-Chief of the Western Army Command from 1964 to 1969, the General retired in September 1969. Captain Amarinder Singh (later Chief Minister of Punjab) of Patiala served him as his ADC.

== Later life and death ==
Harbaksh Singh died on 14 November 1999.

== Publications ==
- War Despatches: Indo-Pakistan Conflict of 1965
- In the Line of Duty: A Soldier Remembers

== Awards and decorations ==
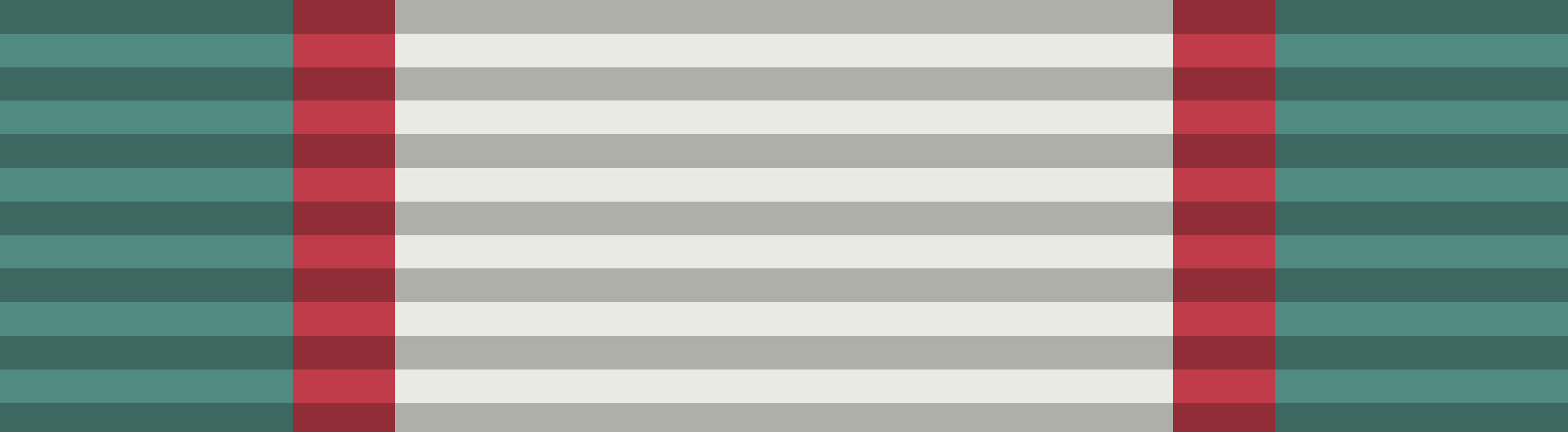

Padma Vibhushan	Padma Bhushan	Vir Chakra
General Service Medal 1947	Samar Seva Star	Raksha Medal
Sainya Seva Medal	Indian Independence Medal 1947	20 Years Long Service Medal
9 Years Long Service Medal	1939-1945 Star	Pacific Star
Defence Medal	War Medal 1939-1945	India General Service Medal

== See also ==
- Gurbakhsh Singh
- Dewan Ranjit Rai
- Captain Amarinder Singh

Military offices
Preceded by Umrao Singh	General Officer Commanding XXXIII Corps; 1962-1964	Succeeded by Gopal Gurunath Bewoor
Preceded by Sam Manekshaw	General Officer Commanding-in-Chief Western Command; 1964-1969	Succeeded by Kunhiraman Palat Candeth
