= Severino Aguilar =

Panamanian wrestler (born 1936)

Personal information
- Nationality: Panama
- Born: 8 June 1936 (age 89); Colón, Panama
- Height: 1.64 m (5 ft 5 in)
- Weight: 70 kg (150 lb)

Sport
- Sport: Wrestling

Severino Aguilar Fruto (born 8 June 1936) is a Panamanian wrestler. He competed in the 1968 Summer Olympics.
