= Roger Till =

British wrestler

Personal information
- Nationality: British
- Born: 4 September 1947 (age 78) London, England

Sport
- Sport: Wrestling

Roger Till (born 4 September 1947) is a British wrestler. He competed in the men's freestyle 70 kg at the 1968 Summer Olympics.
