= Muhammad Taj =

Pakistani wrestler (born 1943)

Personal information
- Nationality: Pakistani
- Born: 10 December 1943 (age 82) Rangpur, British India

Sport
- Sport: Wrestling

Muhammad Taj (born 10 December 1943) is a Pakistani former wrestler. He competed in the men's freestyle 70 kg at the 1968 Summer Olympics.
