= Miroslav Musil =

Czech wrestler (born 1950)

Miroslav Musil (born 5 April 1950) is a Czech former wrestler who competed in the 1972 Summer Olympics.
