= Mehmet Ali Demirtaş =

Turkish wrestler

Mehmet Ali Demirtaş (born 2 March 1951 in Bingöl Gökçedal Deşti village close to Yayladere) is a Turkish former wrestler who competed in the 1972 Summer Olympics.

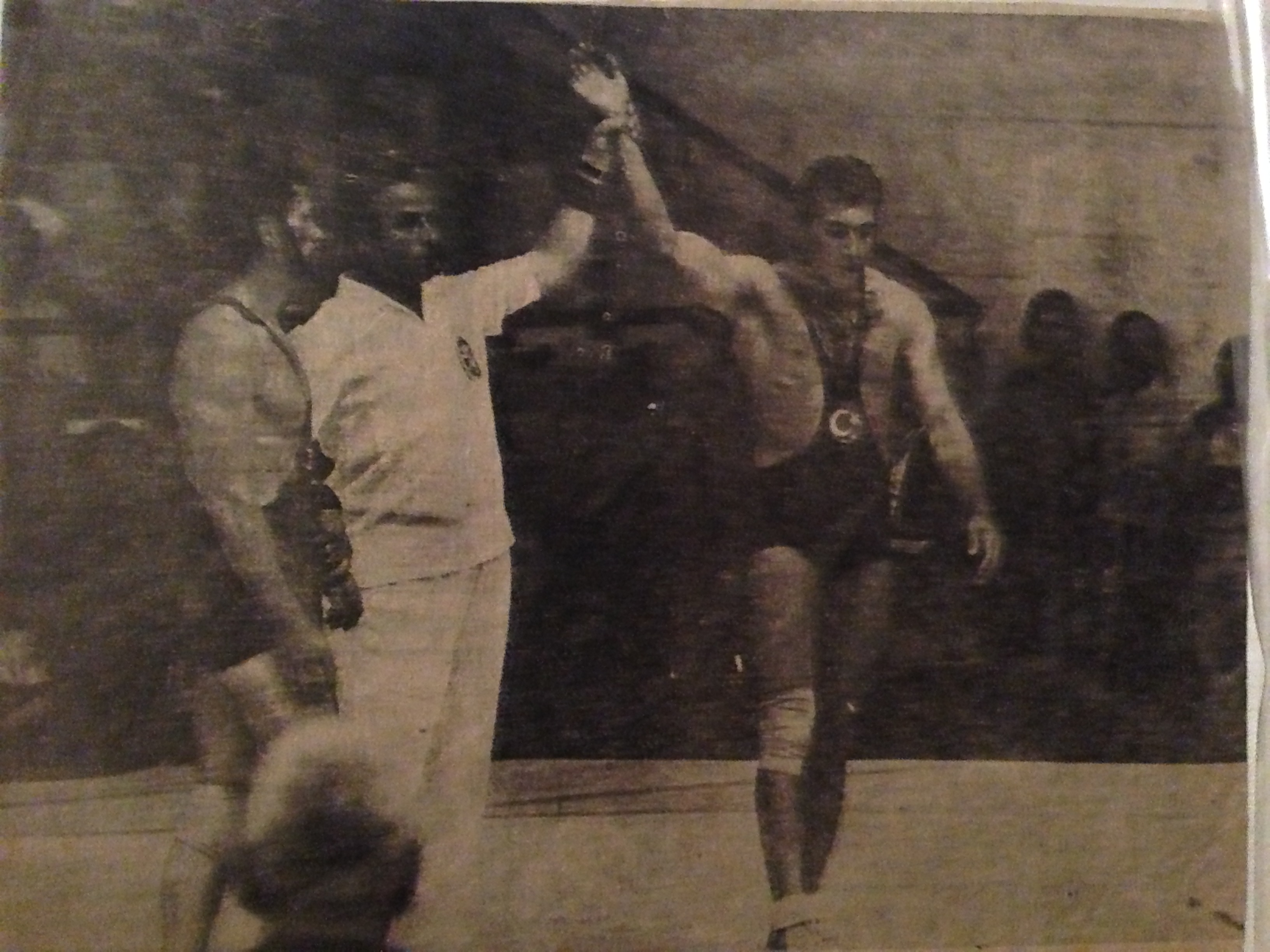
Mehmet Ali Demirtas

He currently resides in Offenburg Germany and is the owner of the Turkish Pascha Restaurant.
