= Inder Singh (field hockey) =

Indian field hockey player

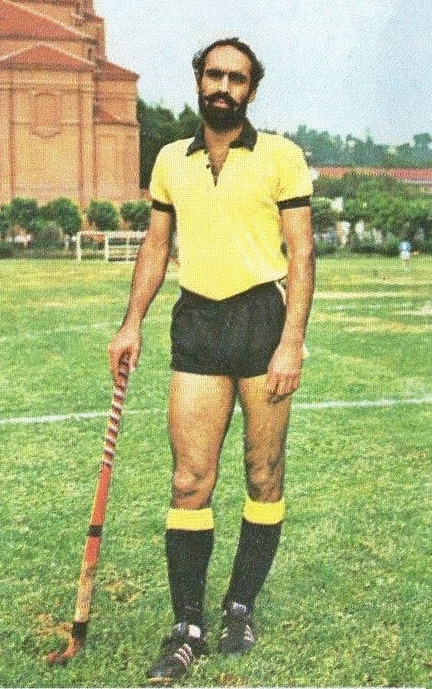

Personal information
- Born: 25 February 1944 Faridkot, Punjab, India
- Died: 19 August 2001 (aged 57) Italy
- Height: 173 cm (5 ft 8 in)
- Weight: 68 kg (150 lb)

Sport
- Sport: Field hockey
- Club: Indian Railways
Medal record
Representing India
Olympic Games
Bronze medal – third place	1968 Mexico	Team competition
Asian Games
Gold medal – first place	1966 Bangkok	Team competition

Inder "Gogi" Singh (25 February 1944 – 19 August 2001) was an Indian hockey player who represented India in the 1968 Summer Olympics.

Nicknamed "Gogi", Singh was born in Faridkot, India. He Married Gianna Fissore, an Italian citizen. Singh settled in Italy after relinquishing his job in the Railways. His wife, Gianna, was also a national-level hockey player of her country. After emigrating to Italy he played a major role in establishing a hockey club in Bra, Piedmont. Their daughter, Jasbeer Singh plays for the Italy women's national field hockey team.

He died of cancer on 19 August 2001.
