= Wolfgang Nitschke =

German former wrestler

Wolfgang Nitschke (born 3 March 1947 in Waldenburg, Saxony) is a German former wrestler who competed in the 1972 Summer Olympics.
