= Mongolian Wrestling Federation =

Governing body of Olympic wrestling in Mongolia

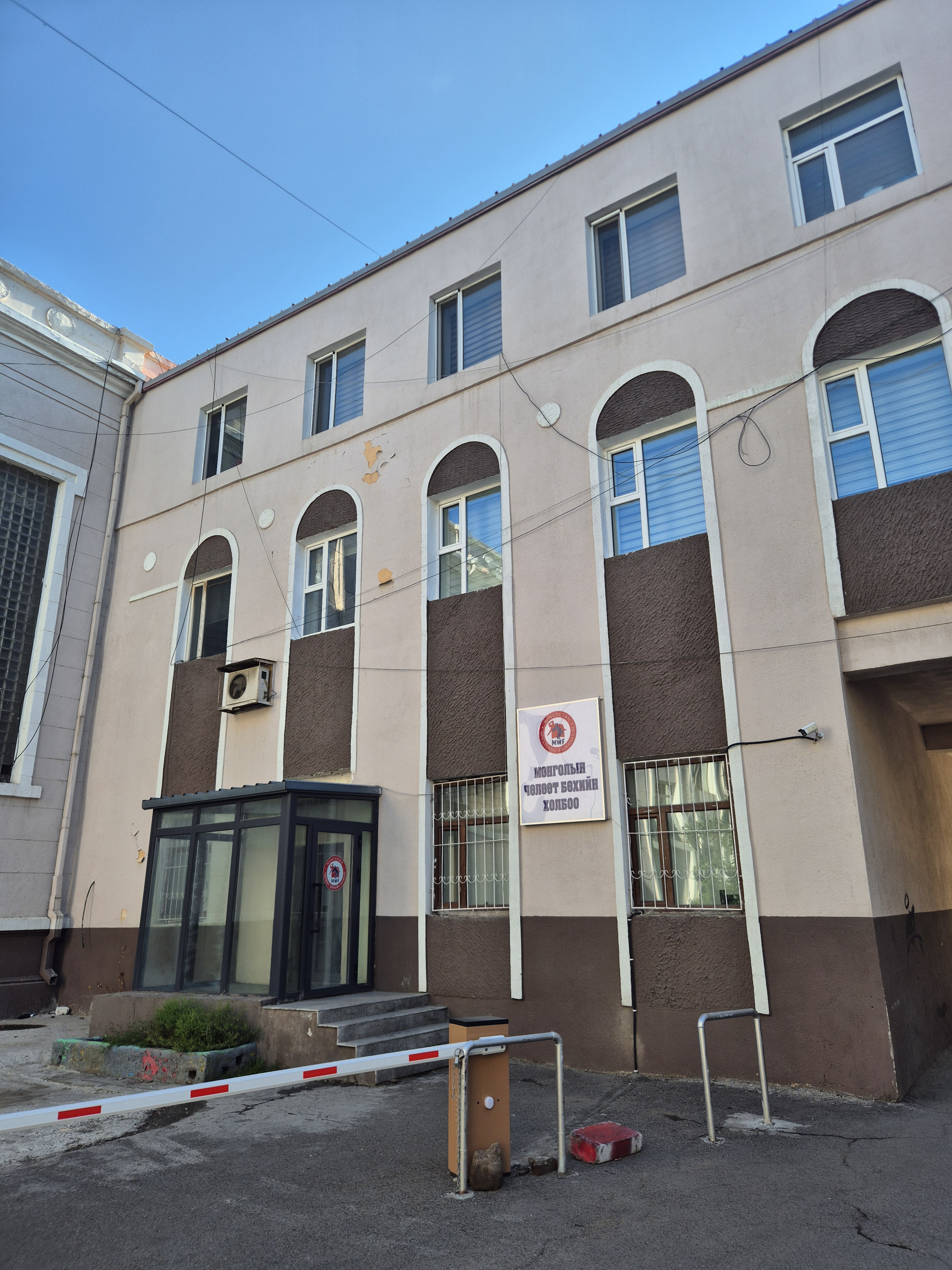
Mongolian Wrestling Federation

Mongolian Wrestling Federation (MWF; Mongolian: Монголын Чөлөөт Бөхийн Холбоо), is the governing body of Olympic wrestling in Mongolia. The Mongolian Wrestling Federation (MWF) was created in 1961 and in the same year was admitted to UWW. MWF is now based in Ulaanbaatar, Mongolia.

== Wrestling olympic medal winners from Mongolia ==
- 1968 Summer Olympics

Jigjidiin Mönkhbat-silver medal Chimedbazaryn Damdinsharav-bronze medal Danzandarjaagiin Sereeter-bronze

- 1972 Summer Olympics

Khorloogiin Bayanmönkh-silver medal

- 1976 Summer Olympics

Zevegiin Oidov-silver medal

- 1980 Summer Olympics

J.Davaajav-silver medal Dugarsürengiin Oyuunbold-bronze medal

- 2012 Summer Olympics

Soronzonboldyn Battsetseg-bronze medal
