= Kenny Stephenson =

British wrestler

Personal information
- Nationality: British (English)
- Born: 12 June 1938 (age 87) Bury, England
- Height: 180 cm (5 ft 11 in)
- Weight: 67 kg (148 lb)

Sport
- Sport: Amateur wrestling
- Club: Bury Wrestling Club

Kenneth "Kenny" Stephenson (born 12 June 1938) is a British wrestler. He competed at the 1960 Summer Olympics and the 1964 Summer Olympics.

Stephenson was a three-times winner of the British Wrestling Championships in 1960, 1965 and 1966.
