= Brian Glencross =

Australian field hockey player (1941–2022)

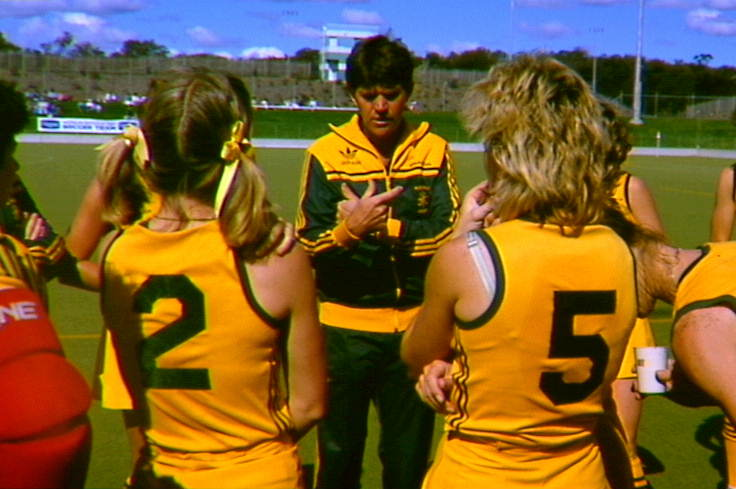
- Glencross coaching in 1985

Personal information
- Born: 1 May 1941 Narrogin, Western Australia
- Died: 30 December 2022 (aged 81)
Medal record
Men's field hockey
Representing Australia
Olympic Games
Silver medal – second place	1968 Mexico City	Team competition
Bronze medal – third place	1964 Tokyo	Team competition

Brian Alan Glencross OAM (1 May 1941 – 30 December 2022) was an Australian field hockey player and coach. As a member of the Australian National Men's Hockey Team, he won a bronze medal and a silver medal at consecutive Olympic Games – the bronze at the 1964 Summer Olympics in Tokyo and the silver four years later, when Mexico City hosted the Games. As a player, he represented Australia from 1964 to 1974, playing in 93 games. He coached the Australian women's hockey team from 1980 to 1992.

Glencross died after a long battle with neurological disease on 30 December 2022, at the age of 81.

Coaching results at major tournaments:

- 1981: 4th – World Cup
- 1983: 3rd – World Cup
- 1984: 4th – Los Angeles Olympic Games
- 1986: 6th – World Cup
- 1987: 2nd – Champions Trophy
- 1988: 1st – Seoul Olympic Games
- 1989: 1st – Champions Trophy
- 1990: 2nd – World Cup
- 1991: 1st – Champions Trophy
- 1992: 5th – Barcelona Olympic Games

Glencross was appointed the inaugural Australian Institute of Sport women's coach in 1984 and held the position to 1995.

== Recognition ==
- 1968 – WA Sports Federation's Sportsman of the Year
- 1991 – Medal of the Order of Australia
- 1991 – inducted into the Sport Australia Hall of Fame
- 1996 – inducted into the WA Hall of Champions.
- 2000 – Australian Sports Medal
- 2001 – Centenary Medal in 2001.
- 2008 – Hockey Australia Hall of Fame
