= Robert Blaser =

Swiss wrestler

Robert Blaser (born 16 February 1948) is a Swiss former wrestler who competed in the 1972 Summer Olympics.
