= Inam-ur Rahman =

Indian field hockey player

Inam-ur Rehman
Personal information
- Nationality: Indian
- Born: 23 November 1943 (age 82) Bhopal, India
- Education: Aligarh Muslim University, India

Sport
- Sport: Field hockey
- Position: Inside Left
- Event: Field Hockey Men's team
Medal record
Men's field hockey
Representing India
Olympic Games
Bronze medal – third place	1968 Mexico City	Team

Inam-ur Rahman (born 23 November 1943) is an Indian former field hockey player. He competed at the 1968 Summer Olympics, winning the bronze medal.
