= Muneer Sait =

Indian field hockey player (born 1940)

Personal information
- Born: 27 May 1940 (age 86) Madras (now Chennai), Madras Presidency (now in Tamil Nadu), British India)

Sport
- Sport: Field hockey
Medal record
Men's field hockey
Representing India
Olympic Games
Bronze medal – third place	1968 Mexico	Team competition

Muneer Sait (sometimes spelled Munir Sait, born 27 May 1940) is a retired Indian field hockey goalkeeper.

Sait was the goalkeeper of the Indian hockey team at the 1968 Mexico City Olympics. The Indian team won the bronze medal that year.

Sait is from Chennai. He has been chosen as tournament director on more than one occasion. He was also chosen as a part of the five member selection committee by the Hockey India in 2009. He lives in Chennai and is also associated with the Squash Rackets Federation of Tamil Nadu.

For his work on field hockey, the International Hockey Federation awarded Sait the President's Award in 2005.
