= Bachir Hani Abou Assi =

Lebanese wrestler (born 1948)

Personal information
- Nationality: Lebanese
- Born: 23 February 1948 (age 77)
- Height: 1.75 m (5 ft 9 in)
- Weight: 74 kg (163 lb)

Sport
- Sport: Wrestling

Bachir Hani Bou Assi (born 23 February 1948) is a Lebanese wrestler. He competed in the 1972 Summer Olympics.
