= Field hockey at the 1968 Summer Olympics =

Field hockey at the Games of the XIX Olympiad
- Venue: Municipal Stadium
- Dates: 13–26 October 1968
- Teams: 16

Medalists
1st place, gold medalist(s)		Pakistan
2nd place, silver medalist(s)		Australia
3rd place, bronze medalist(s)		India

The men's field hockey tournament at the 1968 Summer Olympics was the 11th edition of the field hockey event for men at the Summer Olympics. It took place over a fourteen-day period beginning on 13 October, and culminated with the medal finals on 26 October. All games were played at the Municipal Stadium in Mexico City, Mexico.

Pakistan won the gold medal for the second time after defeating Australia 2–1 in the final. Defending champions India won the bronze medal after defeating West Germany 2–1.

== Competition schedule ==
G	Group stage	C	Classification matches	SF	Semi-finals	B	Bronze-medal match	F	Final

Sun 13	Mon 14	Tue 15	Wed 16	Thu 17	Fri 18	Sat 19	Sun 20	Mon 21	Tue 22	Wed 23	Thu 24	Fri 25	Sat 26	
G	G	G	G	G	G	G	G	G	G	C	SF	C	B	F

== Results ==
=== Preliminary round ===
==== Pool A ====
Pos	Team	Pld	W	D	L	GF	GA	GD	Pts	Qualification
1	India	7	6	0	1	20	4	+16	12	Semi-finals
2	West Germany	7	5	1	1	15	5	+10	11	Semi-finals
3	New Zealand	7	3	4	0	8	4	+4	10	
4	Spain	7	2	3	2	7	5	+2	7	
5	Belgium	7	3	1	3	14	9	+5	7	
6	East Germany	7	2	2	3	7	10	−3	6	
7	Japan	7	1	1	5	4	14	−10	3	
8	Mexico (H)	7	0	0	7	2	26	−24	0	

Source: Sports-Reference
(H) Hosts

13 October 1968

New Zealand	2–1	India

13 October 1968

Japan	2–1	Mexico

13 October 1968

Spain	1–1	East Germany

13 October 1968

West Germany	2–0	Belgium

14 October 1968

India	2–1	West Germany

14 October 1968

Belgium	4–0	East Germany

14 October 1968

Spain	0–0	Japan

14 October 1968

New Zealand	2–0	Mexico

15 October 1968

West Germany	2–0	Japan

15 October 1968

India	8–0	Mexico

15 October 1968

Spain	2–0	Belgium

15 October 1968

East Germany	1–1	New Zealand

17 October 1968

India	1–0	Spain

17 October 1968

West Germany	3–2	East Germany

17 October 1968

Belgium	4–0	Mexico

17 October 1968

New Zealand	1–0	Japan

18 October 1968

India	2–1	Belgium
Prithipal 44'; Harbinder 52'	Report	Gilles 12'

18 October 1968

East Germany	1–0	Japan

18 October 1968

Spain	3–0	Mexico

18 October 1968

West Germany	0–0	New Zealand

20 October 1968

India	5–0 ^{1}	Japan

20 October 1968

New Zealand	1–1	Belgium

20 October 1968

West Germany	2–0	Spain

20 October 1968

East Germany	2–0	Mexico

^{1} The match was abandoned in the 55th minute with the score 0–0 after the Japanese team laid down their sticks and walked off the pitch to protest the awarding of a penalty stroke to India. India were awarded the match 5–0.

21 October 1968

India	1–0	East Germany

21 October 1968

Belgium	4–2	Japan

21 October 1968

New Zealand	1–1	Spain

21 October 1968

West Germany	5–1	Mexico

==== Pool B ====
Pos	Team	Pld	W	D	L	GF	GA	GD	Pts	Qualification
1	Pakistan	7	7	0	0	23	4	+19	14	Semi-finals
2	Australia^{[a]}	8	5	1	2	15	7	+8	11	Semi-finals
3	Kenya^{[a]}	8	4	1	3	13	9	+4	9	
4	Netherlands	7	4	0	3	11	11	0	8	
5	Great Britain	7	2	1	4	6	8	−2	5	
6	France	7	2	1	4	2	5	−3	5	
7	Argentina	7	1	1	5	4	20	−16	3	
8	Malaysia	7	0	3	4	2	12	−10	3	

Source: Sports-References

^[a] – Australia and Kenya finished on equal points at the conclusion of the pool stage, resulting in a match to determine second place in the pool.

13 October 1968

Great Britain	2–0	Argentina

13 October 1968

Australia	2–0	Kenya

13 October 1968

Pakistan	6–0	Netherlands

13 October 1968

France	0–0	Malaysia

14 October 1968

Pakistan	1–0	France

14 October 1968

Australia	0–0	Great Britain

14 October 1968

Kenya	1–1	Malaysia

14 October 1968

Netherlands	7–0	Argentina

16 October 1968

Malaysia	1–1	Argentina

16 October 1968

Pakistan	3–2	Australia

16 October 1968

Netherlands	2–1	Great Britain

16 October 1968

Kenya	2–0	France

17 October 1968

Australia	3–0	Malaysia

17 October 1968

Pakistan	5–0	Argentina

17 October 1968

France	1–0	Great Britain

17 October 1968

Kenya	2–0	Netherlands

19 October 1968

France	1–0	Australia

19 October 1968

Kenya	2–1	Argentina

19 October 1968

Netherlands	1–0	Malaysia

19 October 1968

Pakistan	2–1	Great Britain

20 October 1968

Kenya	3–0	Great Britain

20 October 1968

Netherlands	1–0	France

20 October 1968

Pakistan	4–0	Malaysia

20 October 1968

Australia	3–1	Argentina

21 October 1968

Pakistan	2–1	Kenya

21 October 1968

Australia	2–0	Netherlands

21 October 1968

Argentina	1–0	France

21 October 1968

Great Britain	2–0	Malaysia

==== Second place play-off ====
22 October 1968

Australia	3–2	Kenya

=== Classification round ===
==== Eighth to sixteenth place classification ====
===== Fifteenth place game =====
23 October 1968

Mexico	0–1 (a.e.t.)	Malaysia
	Report

===== Thirteenth place game =====
23 October 1968

Japan	2–0	Argentina
	Report

===== Eleventh place game =====
23 October 1968

East Germany	2–1 (a.e.t.)	Great Britain
	Report

===== Ninth place game =====
23 October 1968

Belgium	3–0	France
	Report

==== Fifth to eighth place classification ====
5–8th place semi-finals
23 October
New Zealand	1
Netherlands	3
23 October
Kenya	1
Spain	2

Fifth place
25 October
Netherlands (a.e.t)	1
Spain	0
Seventh place
25 October
New Zealand	2
Kenya	0

===== 5–8th place-semifinals =====
23 October 1968

New Zealand	1–3	Netherlands
	Report

23 October 1968

Kenya	1–2	Spain
	Report

===== Seventh place game =====
25 October 1968

New Zealand	2–0	Kenya
	Report

===== Fifth place game =====
25 October 1968

Netherlands	1–0 (a.e.t.)	Spain
Thole ?'	Report

== Medal round ==
Semi-finals
24 October
India	1
Australia (a.e.t)	2
24 October
Pakistan	1
West Germany	0

Gold-medal match
26 October
Australia	1
Pakistan	2
Bronze-medal match
26 October
India	2
West Germany	1

=== Semi-finals ===
24 October 1968

Pakistan	1–0	West Germany
	Report

24 October 1968

India	1–2 (a.e.t.)	Australia
Balbir Singh	Report	Glencross 17', 84'

=== Bronze-medal match ===
26 October 1968

(bronze) India	2–1	West Germany
Prithipal Singh 55'; Balbir Singh 63'	Report	Schuler 34'

=== Gold-medal match ===
26 October 1968
12:45

(gold) Pakistan	2–1	Australia (silver)
Rashid 15'; Malik 56'	Report	Glencross 46'

Umpires:
Guust Lathouwers (NED)
Luigi Tinti (ITA)

== Final standings ==
1. Pakistan
2. Australia
3. India
4. West Germany
5. Netherlands
6. Spain
7. New Zealand
8. Kenya
9. Belgium
10. France
11. East Germany
12. Great Britain
13. Japan
14. Argentina
15. Malaysia
16. Mexico

== Medalists ==
Gold	Silver	Bronze
Pakistan Abdul Rashid; Jahangir Butt; Tanvir Dar; Gulraiz Akhtar; Khalid Mahmood; Muhammad Asad Malik; Muhammad Ashfaq Ahmed; Tariq Niazi; Riaz Ahmed; Riaz ud-Din; Saeed Anwar; Tariq Aziz; Zakir Hussain	Australia Paul Dearing; Raymond Evans; Brian Glencross; Robert Haigh; Donald Martin; James Mason; Patrick Nilan; Eric Pearce; Gordon Pearce; Julian Pearce; Desmond Piper; Fred Quine; Ronald Riley; Donald Smart; Arthur Busch	India Rajendra Christy; Krishnamurty Perumal; John "V.J." Peter; Inam-ur Rahman; Munir Sait; Ajitpal Singh; Balbir Singh Kullar; Balbir Singh Kular; Balbir Singh; Gurbux Singh; Harbinder Singh; Harmik Singh; Inder "Gogi" Singh; Prithipal Singh; Tarsem Singh; Jagjit Singh

== Sources ==
- Official Olympic Report
- Mexico Organizing Committee (1968). The Games of the XIX Olympiad: Mexico 1968, vol. 2.
