= Matti Poikala =

Swedish wrestler (born 1935)

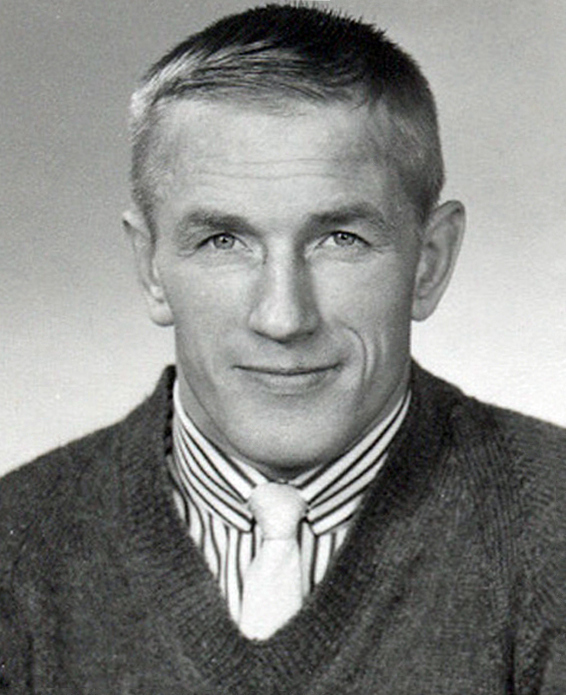

Personal information
- Born: 26 July 1935 (age 90) Sippola, Finland
- Height: 169 cm (5 ft 7 in)

Sport
- Sport: Greco-Roman wrestling
- Club: IFK Hedemora
Medal record
Men's wrestling (Greco-Roman)
Representing Sweden
World Championships
Bronze medal – third place	1969 Mar del Plata	-74 kg
European Championships
Silver medal – second place	1968 Västerås	-70 kg

Matti Tapio Poikala (born 26 July 1935) is a retired Swedish wrestler. He competed in the freestyle lightweight division at the 1964 Summer Olympics, but was eliminated in the second bout. He then won a silver medal at the 1968 European and a bronze at the 1969 world championships in Greco-Roman wrestling, and finished fourth in 1969 in the 74 kg freestyle contest.

Poikala was born in Finland and immigrated to Sweden in 1959.
