= Rajendran Christie =

Indian field hockey player (1938–1992)

Personal information
- Full name: Rajendran Absolem Christie
- Born: 1 July 1938 (age 88) Bangalore, Kingdom of Mysore, (now in Karnataka, India)
- Died: 22 December 1992 (aged 54) Bangalore, Karnataka, India

Sport
- Sport: Field hockey
- Position: Goalkeeper
Medal record
Men's field hockey
Representing India
Olympic Games
Gold medal – first place	1964 Tokyo	Team
Bronze medal – third place	1968 Mexico City	Team
Asian Games
Silver medal – second place	1962 Jakarta	Team

Rajendran Absolem Christie (1 July 1938 – 22 December 1992) was an Indian former field hockey player. He was the goalkeeper of the Indian hockey team that won the gold medal in the 1964 Summer Olympics at Tokyo, Japan, and the bronze medal in the 1968 Summer Olympics at $1Mexico City$2, Mexico, Mexico. They also won the silver medal in the 1962 Asian Games at Jakarta, Indonesia.

Christy was an alumnus of Bangalore Military School. As a mark of respect, the school Hockey ground was named after him. He died on 22 December 1992 in Bangalore.
