= Krishnamurthy Perumal =

Indian field hockey player (born 1943)

Personal information
- Born: 26 September 1943 (age 82) Madras (now Chennai), Madras Presidency (now in Tamil Nadu), British India
Medal record
Men's field hockey
Representing India
Olympic Games
Bronze medal – third place	1968 Mexico City	Team competition
Bronze medal – third place	1972 Munich	Team competition
Hockey World Cup
Bronze medal – third place	1971 Barcelona	Team
Asian Games
Silver medal – second place	1970 Bangkok	Team competition

Krishnamurthy Perumal (born 26 September 1943) is a two-time Olympic medalist in field hockey and Arjuna Award winning sportsman for India. He hails from the city of Chennai, Tamil Nadu. En route to the Indian national hockey team, he played for teams such as the ICF (Integrated Coach Factory), Tamil Nadu and Indian Airlines. He has served Indian and Tamil Nadu hockey with distinction in various roles – as a player, manager and coach. He served as the president of Tamil Nadu Hockey Association. For his dedication and excellence in his sport, he was honored with what was then, India's highest accolade for a sportsman – the Arjuna Award – in 1971.
