= Iwao Horiuchi =

Japanese freestyle wrestler (1941–2015)

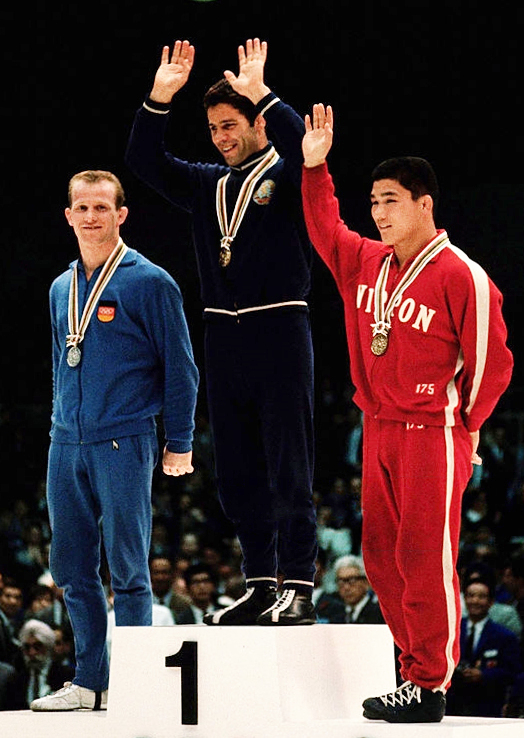
- Iwao Horiuchi (right) at the 1964 Olympics

Personal information
- Born: 9 December 1941 Toyama, Japan
- Died: 4 March 2015 (aged 73)
- Height: 1.63 m (5 ft 4 in)
- Weight: 70 kg (150 lb)

Sport
- Sport: Freestyle wrestling
Medal record
Men's freestyle wrestling
Representing Japan
Olympic Games
Bronze medal – third place	1964 Tokyo	Lightweight
World Championships
Gold medal – first place	1963 Sofia	70 kg
Silver medal – second place	1966 Toledo	70 kg

Iwao Horiuchi (堀内 岩雄, 9 December 1941 – 4 March 2015) was a Japanese lightweight freestyle wrestler. He competed at the 1964 and 1968 Olympics and won a bronze medal in 1964. He also won a world title in 1963 and finished second in 1966. He died of diabetes in March 2015, aged 73.
