= Tarsem Singh (field hockey) =

Indian field hockey player

Medal record

Men's field hockey

Representing India

Olympic Games
Bronze medal – third place	1968 Mexico City	Team competition

Asian Games
Gold medal – first place	1966 Bangkok	Team competition

Tarsem Singh Kular (9 December 1946 – 28 November 2005) was an Indian field hockey player. He was born in Sansarpur, Punjab. He won a bronze medal at the 1968 Summer Olympics in Mexico City.
