= Yancho Pavlov =

Bulgarian wrestler

Yancho Pavlov (Bulgarian: Янчо Павлов; born 25 October 1951) is a Bulgarian former wrestler who competed in the 1972 Summer Olympics and in the 1976 Summer Olympics.
