= Toshitada Yoshida =

Japanese sport wrestler (born 1947)

Toshitada Yoshida (吉田 敏忠, Yoshida Toshitada; born 1 September 1947) is a Japanese former wrestler who competed in the 1972 Summer Olympics.
