= Bruno Hartmann =

Austrian wrestler (born 1946)

Bruno Hartmann (born 4 October 1946) is an Austrian former wrestler who competed in the 1972 Summer Olympics.
