= Aka-Jahan Dastagir =

Afghan wrestler

Aka-Jahan Dastagir (born 15 June 1946 in Kabul) is a former Afghanistan wrestler. He represented his country at the 1968 Summer Olympics in the lightweight freestyle event.
