= Sidney Marsh =

Australian wrestler (born 1939)

Personal information
- Nationality: Australian
- Born: 31 August 1939 New South Wales, Australia
- Died: 2 April 2022 (aged 82)

Sport
- Sport: Wrestling

Sidney Reginald Marsh (31 August 1939 – 2 April 2022) was an Australian wrestler. He competed at the 1964 Summer Olympics and the 1968 Summer Olympics.
