= Wayne Wells =

American wrestler (born 1946)

Personal information
- Born: Wayne Turner Wells; September 29, 1946 (age 79) Abilene, Texas, U.S.
- Home town: Oklahoma City, Oklahoma, U.S.

Sport
- Country: United States
- Sport: Wrestling
- Events: Freestyle and Folkstyle
- College team: Oklahoma
- Team: USA
Medal record
Men's freestyle wrestling
Representing the United States
Olympic Games
Gold medal – first place	1972 Munich	74 kg
World Championships
Gold medal – first place	1970 Edmonton	74 kg
Silver medal – second place	1969 Mar del Plata	74 kg
Pan American Games
Silver medal – second place	1971 Cali	74 kg
Collegiate Wrestling
Representing the Oklahoma Sooners
NCAA Division I Championships
Gold medal – first place	1968 State College	152 lb
Silver medal – second place	1967 Kent	152 lb

Wayne Turner Wells (born September 29, 1946) is an American wrestler and Olympic champion in freestyle wrestling at the 1972 Olympic Games. Wells was born in Abilene, Texas and grew up in Oklahoma. In 1982, Wells was inducted into the National Wrestling Hall of Fame as a Distinguished Member.

== Wrestling career ==
While wrestling at the University of Oklahoma, Wayne was a three-time Big Eight champion and a three-time All-American. He was an NCAA runner-up as a junior, he won the NCAA national championship the following year as a senior.

Wells placed fourth at the 1968 Olympic Games. While turning his attention to law school and the foundation of his professional career, Wayne intensified his wrestling efforts. He captured the silver medal at the 1969 World Championships, then returned a year later to win gold at the 1970 World Championships. He won two national freestyle titles and placed second in the Pan American Games. In the months leading up to the 1972 Olympics, he completed his final year of law school, passed the state bar exam, assisted the OU coaching staff, and trained five hours a day. At the 1972 Olympic Games in Munich, he earned a gold medal in freestyle wrestling in the welterweight class. Wells is also noted for being the first ever Nike signature athlete.

In 1982, Wells was inducted into the National Wrestling Hall of Fame as a Distinguished Member.
