= Gord Garvie =

Canadian wrestler

Personal information
- Born: 25 October 1944; Saskatoon, Saskatchewan, Canada
- Died: 6 August 1988 (aged 43); Saskatoon, Saskatchewan, Canada

Sport
- Sport: Wrestling

Gord Garvie (25 October 1944 – 6 August 1988) was a Canadian wrestler. He competed in two events at the 1968 Summer Olympics.
