= Balbir Singh Grewal =

Indian field hockey player (born 1945)

Personal information
- Nickname: Balbir Singh (Railways)
- Nationality: India
- Born: 21 September 1945 (age 81) Lyallpur, Punjab Province, British India (present-day Faisalabad, Punjab, Pakistan)
- Relative: Gurbux Singh (brother)

Sport
- Sport: Field hockey
- Event: Men's team
Medal record
Men's field hockey
Representing India
Olympic Games
Bronze medal – third place	1968 Mexico City	Team
Asian Games
Gold medal – first place	1966 Bangkok	Team
Silver medal – second place	1970 Bangkok	Team

Balbir Singh Grewal (born 21 September 1945), also known as Balbir Singh (Railways), is a retired Indian field hockey player. He played for Railways in the Indian Senior National Hockey Championship. He was part of the Indian teams that won the bronze medal at the 1968 Summer Olympics, gold medal at the 1966 Asian Games and silver medal at the 1970 Asian Games. His brother was the Indian hockey international Gurbax Singh Grewal.
