= Kik Thole =

Dutch field hockey player

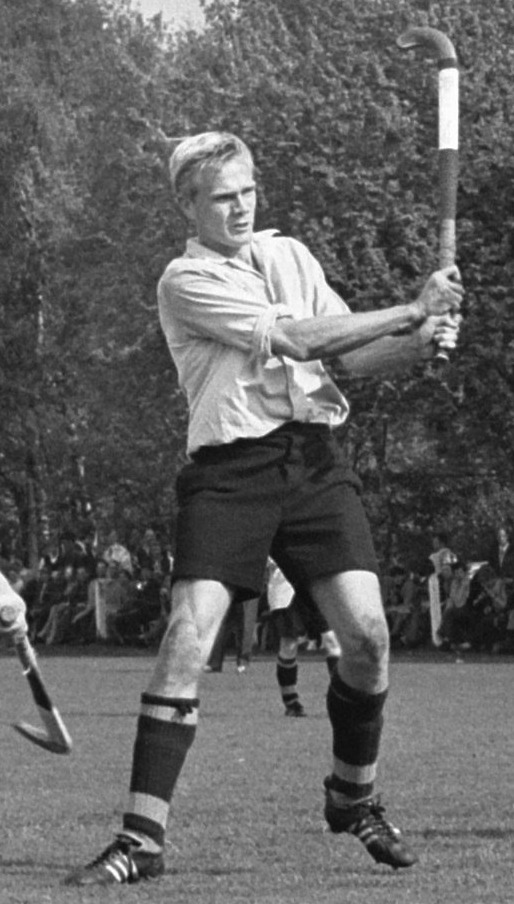
- Kik Thole in 1969

Personal information
- Born: 5 February 1944 (age 82) Bussum, the Netherlands
- Height: 1.85 m (6 ft 1 in)
- Weight: 81 kg (179 lb)

Sport
- Sport: Field hockey
- Club: Be Fair, Hilversum; Laren MHC, Laren
Medal record
Representing the Netherlands
EuroHockey Nations Championship
Silver medal – second place	1970 Brussels	Team

Charles Henri Marie "Kik" Thole (born 5 February 1944) is a retired field hockey player from the Netherlands. He competed at the 1968 and 1972 Olympics, where his teams finished in fifth and fourth place, respectively.

Between 1966 and 1972 Thole played 54 international matches and scored 7 goals.
