= Seyyit Ahmet Ağralı =

Turkish wrestler

Personal information
- Nationality: Turkey
- Born: 1940; Kavak, Turkey
- Height: 1.68 m (5 ft 6 in)
- Weight: 70 kg (150 lb)

Sport
- Sport: Wrestling

Seyyit Ahmet Ağralı (born 1940) is a Turkish wrestler. He competed in the 1968 Summer Olympics.
