= Guy Marchand (wrestler) =

French wrestler

Personal information
- Nationality: French
- Born: 23 June 1943; Dijon, France
- Died: 22 June 2015 (aged 71); Dijon, France

Sport
- Sport: Wrestling

Guy Marchand (23 June 1943 – 22 June 2015) was a French wrestler. He competed in two events at the 1968 Summer Olympics.
