= Yury Gusov =

Soviet freestyle wrestler

- Yury Gusov in 1972

Personal information
- Born: 18 March 1940 Vladikavkaz, Russia
- Died: 8 March 2002 (aged 61) Vladikavkaz, Russia
- Height: 167 cm (5 ft 6 in)
- Weight: 74 kg (163 lb)

Sport
- Sport: Freestyle wrestling
Medal record
Representing the Soviet Union
World Championships
Gold medal – first place	1971 Sofia	74 kg
European Championships
Gold medal – first place	1969 Sofia	74 kg
Silver medal – second place	1968 Sofia	74 kg
USSR Championships
Gold medal – first place	1970 Novosibirsk	74 kg
Gold medal – first place	1968 Makhachkala	70 kg
Gold medal – first place	1967 Sofia	70 kg

Yury Soltanbekovich Gusov (Russian: Юрий Солтанбекович Гусов, 18 March 1940 – 8 March 2002) was a Soviet welterweight freestyle wrestler who competed in the 1972 Summer Olympics. He won a world title in 1971 and a European title in 1969, finishing second in 1968. Gusov was the USSR champion in 1967, 1968, and 1970. He also won the USSR Peoples Spartakiad in 1971.
