= Francisco Lebeque =

Cuban wrestler (born 1949)

Personal information
- Born: 3 April 1949 (age 77)

Sport
- Country: Cuba
Medal record
Men's freestyle wrestling
Representing Cuba
Pan American Games
Gold medal – first place	1971 Cali	74 kg

Francisco Lebeque (born 3 April 1949) is a Cuban former wrestler who competed in the 1968 Summer Olympics and in the 1972 Summer Olympics.

Francisco Lebeque won the 1971 Pan American Games Wrestling Tournament in the 74 kg event which was held from July 30 to August 13 in Cali, Colombia, including the match against reigning World Champion Wayne Wells.
