= Klaus Rost =

German wrestler (1940–2023)

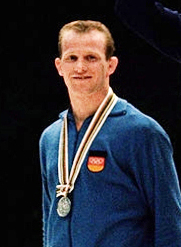
- Rost at the 1964 Olympics

Personal information
- Born: 2 March 1940 Witten, Germany
- Died: 10 August 2023 (aged 83) Witten, North Rhine-Westphalia, Germany
- Height: 1.68 m (5 ft 6 in)
- Weight: 70 kg (150 lb)

Sport
- Sport: Wrestling
- Club: SU Annen, Witten; KSV Witten 07
Medal record
Representing Germany
Men's freestyle wrestling
Olympic Games
Silver medal – second place	1964 Tokyo	Lightweight
Men's Greco-Roman wrestling
World Championships
Bronze medal – third place	1963 Sofia	70 kg

Klaus Rost (2 March 1940 – 10 August 2023) was a German lightweight wrestler. He competed in freestyle wrestling at the 1964, 1968, and 1972 Olympics and won a silver medal in 1964. In Greco-Roman wrestling he won a bronze medal at the 1963 World Championships, and finished fourth at the 1968 Olympics and 1969 World Championships.

Rost died in Witten on 10 August 2023, at the age of 83.
