= Ludovic Ambruș =

Romanian wrestler

Personal information
- Born: 17 September 1946 (age 79)
- Height: 167 cm (5 ft 6 in)
- Weight: 74 kg (163 lb)

Sport
- Sport: Freestyle wrestling
Medal record
Representing the Romania
World Championships
| Bronze medal – third place | 1971 Sofia | 74 kg |

Lajos Ambrus (born 17 September 1946) is an ethnic Hungarian former wrestler of Romania, who competed in the 1972 Summer Olympics.
