= Carlos Alberto Vario =

Argentine wrestler

Personal information
- Born: 17 October 1947 (age 78) Buenos Aires, Argentina

Sport
- Sport: Wrestling

Achievements and titles
- Olympic finals: 1964 Summer Olympics; 1968 Summer Olympics

Carlos Alberto Vario (born 17 October 1947) is an Argentine wrestler. He competed at the 1964 Summer Olympics and the 1968 Summer Olympics.
