= Stefanos Ioannidis =

Greek wrestler

Personal information
- Nationality: Greek
- Born: 23 March 1933 (age 93) Kilkis, Greece

Sport
- Sport: Wrestling

Stefanos Ioannidis (Greek: Στέφανος Ιωαννίδης; born 23 March 1933) is a Greek wrestler. He competed at the 1960, 1964, 1968 and the 1972 Summer Olympics.
