= Narayan (name) =

Narayana (also rendered Narayane, Narayanan, Narain, Narayankar or Narine) (from Sanskrit नारायण, nārāyaṇá, literally "eternal man") is an Indian name. It is identical in form to the name of the deity Narayana, another name for Vishnu. The name Narayana is predominantly used in South India especially among Kannada, Tamil, Malayalam and Telugu speakers.

== Notable people ==
=== Narayana ===
- Narayana Pandit, mathematician
- Narayana Pillai (disambiguation)
- Narayana Rao (disambiguation)
- Narayana Reddy (disambiguation)
- Suryanarayana (disambiguation)
- Tadepalli Venkata Narayana (1930-1987), Indo-Canadian mathematician

=== Narayan ===
- Narayan (actor), Indian film actor
- Narayan (writer) (1940–2022), Indian writer
- Aditya Narayan, Indian television show host
- Alison R.H. Narayan, American chemistry professor
- Badri Narayan (1929–2013), Indian artist
- Brij Narayan, Indian sarod player
- Irene Jai Narayan (1932–2011), Fiji Indian politician
- Jagaddipendra Narayan (1915–1970), Maharaja of Cooch Behar
- Jayaprakash Narayan (1902–1979), Indian independence activist and politician
- Jayaprakash Narayan (Lok Satta), Indian politician
- Justin Narayan, Australian youth pastor and chef
- Kalanidhi Narayanan (1928–2016), Indian dancer and dance teacher
- Kirin Narayan, Indian-born American author and folklorist
- Kunwar Narayan (1927–2017), Indian poet
- Manu Narayan, American actor
- Narayan Ram Arya, Indian politician
- Nara Narayan (1554–1587), ruler of Koch kingdom
- Narayan Pandit (died 10th century), Brāhmaṇa author
- Opendra Narayan (1936–2007), Indian-American AIDS researcher
- Paresh Narayan, Fiji Indian academic
- Prema Narayan, Indian actress and dancer
- R. K. Narayan (1906–2001), Indian novelist
- Rajee Narayan (1931–2020), Indian dancer and musician
- Ram Narayan (1927–2024), Indian sarangi player
- Ram Narayan, Indian politician
- Ramesh Narayan, Indian classical singer
- Rudy Narayan (1938–1998), British barrister
- Samarendra Narayan Dev (1940–2025), Indian filmmaker
- Shoba Narayan, Indian journalist
- Shoba Narayan (actress), Indian-American actress and singer
- Shovana Narayan, Indian Kathak dancer
- Shridhar Narayan Huddar, the brother of Gopal Mukund Huddar (1902–1981), an Indian anti-colonial activist and soldier
- Siddharth Narayan, Indian actor and singer
- Udit Narayan, Indian Playback singer
- Uma Narayan, Indian feminist scholar

=== Narain ===
- Narain (actor), Indian actor
- A.K. Narain (1925–2013), Indian historian
- Clyde Sergio Narain, better known as Chuckie, Surinamese house producer and DJ
- Govind Narain (1916–2012), a leading civil servant
- Narain Karthikeyan, Indian former Formula One and A1GP driver
- Nicole Narain, American model and actress
- Raj Narain (1917–1986), Indian politician
- Ruchi Narain, Indian film director and screenwriter
- Sase Narain (1925–2020), Guyanese politician and lawyer
- Sathi Narain (1919–1989), Fiji Indian businessman
- Sunita Narain, Indian environmentalist and political activist
- Vineet Narain, Indian journalist and activist
- Yogendra Narain, IAS officer
- Late Maharaj Kumar Basant Narain Singh, Member of the 7th loksabha of India and of the ruling family of Ramgarh Raj

=== Narayanan ===
- K. K. Narayanan (1948–2025), Indian politician from the state of Kerala
- K. R. Narayanan (1920–2005), the tenth President of the Republic of India
- Lata Narayanan (born 1966), Indian-Canadian computer scientist
- Mayankote Kelath Narayanan, National Security Advisor (NSA) to the Prime Minister of India
- Narayanankutty, Indian film actor in Malayalam movies
- Santhosh Narayanan, Indian music composer.
- V. Narayanan (disambiguation), multiple persons
