= Prasenjit =

Prasenjit or Prosenjit is an Indian male given name of Sanskrit origin. It may refer to:

- Prasenajit (Pasenadi in Pali), ancient Indian king of Kosala in the 6th-century BCE
- Prasenjit Biswas (born 1969), Indian academic
- Prasanjit Das (born 1987), Indian cricketer
- Prasenjit Duara, Indian-origin historian
- Prasenjit Ganguly (born 1976), Indian cricketer
- Prasenjit Sen, Indian academic
- Prosenjit "Jit" Bose, Indian-Canadian mathematician and computer scientist
- Prosenjit Chatterjee (born 1962), Indian film actor and producer
- Prosenjit Poddar, Indian student involved in Tarasoff v. Regents of the University of California
- Prosenjit, titular character of the 2022 Indian film Prosenjit Weds Rituparna
