= East Bengal cricket team =

Professional cricket club based in Kolkata, West Bengal

Team information
- City: Kolkata
- Colours: Red and Gold
- Home ground: Eden Gardens
- Capacity: 66,349

History
- CAB First Division League wins: 16
- CAB Senior Knockout wins: 13

The East Bengal cricket team is an Indian professional cricket team based in Kolkata, West Bengal. It participates in various tournaments of varying age groups conducted by the Cricket Association of Bengal. The team plays its home matches mostly at the Eden Gardens and Jadavpur University Campus Ground.

The club currently participates in the CAB First Division League, CAB Senior Knockout, CAB Super League and JC Mukherjee Trophy. They have so far won 60 major state-level trophies in their history.

== History ==
The East Bengal Club Cricket team has been operative since the formation of the club in 1920 and has been actively participating in the Cricket Association of Bengal first Division league since the 50s and won their first Cricket Association of Bengal First Division League title in 1974–75 season jointly with Mohun Bagan. The team has won the CAB First Division League sixteen times, with the latest league title in the 2016–17 season. The team has also won the CAB Senior Knockout tournament thirteen times, the J. C. Mukherjee Trophy twelve times, the P. Sen Memorial Invitation Trophy ten times, the A. N. Ghosh Memorial Trophy eight times.

Many famous names have come and played for the East Bengal Cricket team, including the "Master Blaster" Sachin Tendulkar. He, along with Indian cricket icons Kapil Dev, Ajay Jadeja, Pravin Amre, played for the East Bengal cricket team in the 1994 P. Sen Trophy led by himself which they won defeating Mohun Bagan in the final.

East Bengal appointed coach Abdul Monayem in 2023. The club also appointed former cricketer Sambaran Banerjee as the mentor of the team.

== Current squad ==
The Cricket squad of East Bengal Club for the season 2024–2025

As of 3 September 2024
Player(s) with international caps are listed in bold.

Name	D.O.B.	Batting style	Bowling style
Ankur Paul	21 December 1997 (age 28)		
Diganta Neogi	19 December 2000 (age 25)		
Sayan Sekhar Mondal	10 November 1989 (age 36)	Left-handed	Right-arm Medium
Soham Ghosh	29 March 1986 (age 39)	Right-handed	Right-arm spin
Sougata Dutta	27 December 1984 (age 41)	Right-handed	
Prasenjit Das	11 June 1987 (age 38)	Right-handed	Leg Break
Avirup Gupta	26 September 1990 (age 35)	Left-handed	Right-arm offbreak
Suvankar Bal	3 December 1995 (age 30)	Right-handed	Wicketkeeper
Akash Ghatak	13 October 1996 (age 29)		
Akash Pandey		Right-handed	Right-arm fast
Sachin Kumar Yadav			
Ishan Porel	5 September 1998 (age 27)	Right-handed	Right-arm fast-medium
Mohammed Arif Ansari			Wicketkeeper
Sohaib Latif			
Kohinoor Singh	02 September 2008 (age 16)	Right-handed	Right-arm medium
Soumyadeep Mondal			
Susanta Das			
Roshan Singh			
Souvik Ghosh			
Adarsh Singh			
Sunny Patel	10 April 1987 (age 35)	Right-handed	Right-arm offbreak
Anuj Singh			
Arka Pratim Das			
Proloy Banerjee			
Idris Sardar			
Anik Banerjee			
Priyabrata Ghosh Dastidar	06 September 2007 (age 18)	Left-handed	Left-arm legbreak

=== Coaching staff ===
Rakesh Krishnan	Batting Coach
Sushil Sikaria	Bowling Coach
Swaran Bandopadhyay	Mentor

== Honours ==
List of all Major Tournaments won by East Bengal Club in Cricket:

- CAB First Division League

Champions (16): 1974-75, (Note: Joint Winners with Mohun Bagan) 1977-78, 1978-79, 1980-81, 1983-84, 1993-94, 1994-95, 1998-99, 2000-01, 2001-02, 2005-06, 2006-07, 2009-10, 2011-12, 2013-14, 2016-17

- CAB Senior Knockout

Champions (13): 1975-76, 1977-78, 1979-80, 1982-83, 1985-86, 1987-88, 1997-98, 2003-04, 2004-05, 2010-11, 2012-13, 2013-14, 2014-15

- J. C. Mukherjee Trophy

Champions (12): 1977-78, 1983-84, 1986-87, 1987- 88, 1993-94, 1997-98, 1998-99, 2003-04, 2004-05, 2005-06, (Note: Joint winners with Kalighat Club) 2009-10, 2016-17

- P. Sen Memorial Invitation Trophy

Champions (10): 1976-77, 1978-79, 1993-94, 1997-98, 1999-2000, 2001-02, 2003-04, 2011-12, 2013-14, 2016-17

- A. N. Ghosh Memorial Trophy

Champions (8): 1992-93, 1996-97, 1997-98, 1998-99, 2000-01, 2013-14, 2014-15, 2015-16

- CAB Super League

Champions (1): 2016-17
