= Stefan Langerman =

Belgian computer scientist and mathematician

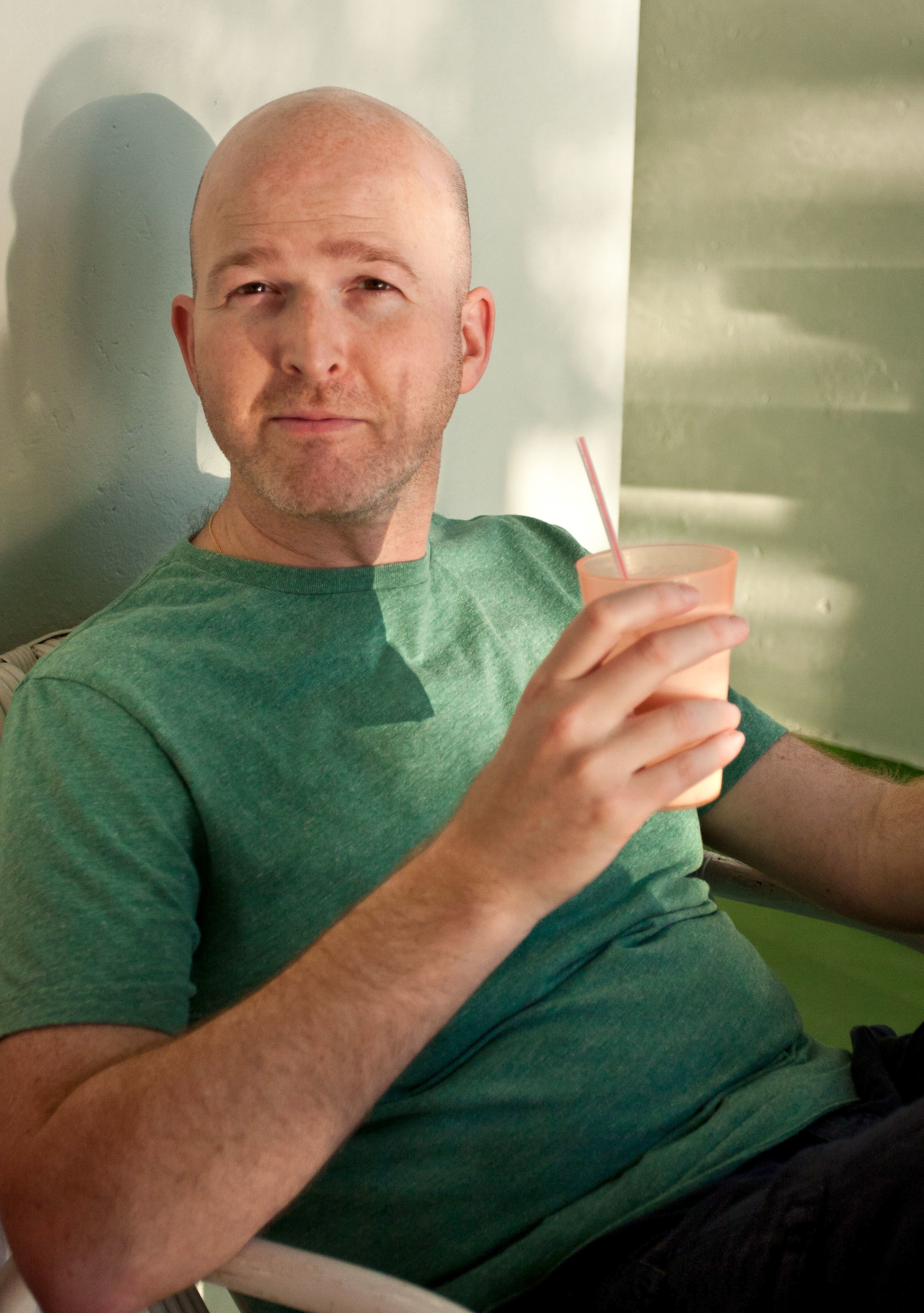
- Bellairs, 2015
- Education: Université libre de Bruxelles; Rutgers University
- Scientific career
- Workplaces: Université libre de Bruxelles; Fonds de la Recherche Scientifique
- Doctoral advisor: William Steiger

Stefan Langerman false Swarzberg is a Belgian computer scientist and mathematician whose research topics include computational geometry, data structures, and recreational mathematics. He is professor and co-head of the algorithms research group at the Université libre de Bruxelles (ULB) with Jean Cardinal. He is a director of research for the Belgian Fonds de la Recherche Scientifique (FRS–FNRS).

Stefan Langerman is the CEO of the family company Langerman Diamonds, trading in natural color diamonds.

== Education and career ==
Langerman left his Belgian secondary school at age 13 and was admitted by examination to the École polytechnique of the Université libre de Bruxelles. He studied civil engineering there for two years before switching his course of study to computer science, and earning a licenciate.

After working as a user interface programmer for the Center for Digital Molecular Biophysics in Gembloux, he moved to the US for graduate study at Rutgers University, where he earned a master's degree and then in 2001 a PhD. His doctoral dissertation, Algorithms and Data Structures in Computational Geometry, was supervised by William Steiger. Next, before joining ULB and FNRS, Langerman worked as a postdoctoral researcher at McGill University with computational geometry researchers Luc Devroye and Godfried Toussaint.

== Research ==
Langerman's research is primarily in computational geometry. Known for novel and often playful results such as "Wrapping the Mozartkugel"^{[WM]} which earned him the moniker of a computational chocolatier, Langerman has made a number of scientific advances in fields as diverse as musical similarity,^{[MMS]} polycube unfolding,^{[CUP]} computational archaeology,^{[WBT]} and protein folding. Langerman's work in data structures includes the co-invention of the queap^{[Q]} and the introduction of the notion of retroactive data structures,^{[RDS]} a generalization of the concept of a persistent data structure. He is the author or more than 240 publications, and has led scientific missions with other western scientists to collaborate with colleagues in North Korea.

== Family ==
Langerman also runs the family firm Langerman SRL, trading as Langerman Diamonds, a Belgian color-diamond company founded in 1965 by his father Arthur Langerman, a dealer of color diamonds who is also noted as a collector of anti-semitic materials. He is the co-author with his father of a paper on Morpion solitaire, written jointly with another father-and-son pair, Martin Demaine and Erik Demaine.^{[MS]} Both Stefan Langerman and his father are members of the Board of Trustees of the Arthur Langerman Foundation, a non-profit organization based in Berlin, which makes its founder's unique collection of visual antisemitica available for research, educational and exhibition purposes.

== Selected publications ==
CUP.	Aloupis, Greg; Bose, Prosenjit K.; Collette, Sébastien; Demaine, Erik D.; Demaine, Martin L.; Douïeb, Karim; Dujmović, Vida; Iacono, John; Langerman, Stefan; Morin, Pat (2011), "Common unfoldings of polyominoes and polycubes", in Akiyama, Jin; Bo, Jiang; Kano, Mikio; Tan, Xuehou (eds.), Computational Geometry, Graphs and Applications: 9th International Conference, CUP 2010, Dalian, China, November 3-6, 2010, Revised Selected Papers, Lecture Notes in Computer Science, vol. 7033, Heidelberg: Springer, pp. 44–54, doi:10.1007/978-3-642-24983-9_5, hdl:1721.1/73836, ISBN 978-3-642-24982-2, MR 2927309

MMS.	Aloupis, Greg; Fevens, Thomas; Langerman, Stefan; Matsui, Tomomi; Mesa, Antonio; Nuñez, Yurai; Rappaport, David; Toussaint, Godfried (September 2006), "Algorithms for computing geometric measures of melodic similarity", Computer Music Journal, 30 (3): 67–76, doi:10.1162/comj.2006.30.3.67, JSTOR 4617944, S2CID 14469036

MS.	Demaine, Erik D.; Demaine, Martin L.; Langerman, Arthur; Langerman, Stefan (2006), "Morpion solitaire" (PDF), Theory of Computing Systems, 39 (3): 439–453, doi:10.1007/s00224-005-1240-4, MR 2218413, S2CID 9664785

Q.	Iacono, John; Langerman, Stefan (2005), "Queaps", Algorithmica, 42 (1): 49–56, doi:10.1007/s00453-004-1139-5, MR 2131828

RDS.	Demaine, Erik D.; Iacono, John; Langerman, Stefan (2007), "Retroactive data structures", ACM Transactions on Algorithms, 3 (2): A13:1–A13:20, doi:10.1145/1240233.1240236, MR 2335296, S2CID 5555302

WBT.	Aloupis, G.; Cardinal, J.; Collette, S.; Iacono, J.; Langerman, S. (2006), "Where to build a temple, and where to dig to find one", Proceedings of the 22nd European Workshop on Computational Geometry (EuroCG06)

WM.	Demaine, E.D.; Demaine, M.L.; Iacono, J.; Langerman, S. (2007), "Wrapping the Mozartkugel", Abstracts of the 20th European Workshop on Computational Geometry
