= Retroactive =

Retroactive may refer to:

- Retroactive (album), an album by Grand Puba
- Retro-active, an album by Karizma
- Retro Active, an album by Def Leppard
- Retroactive (film), a 1997 movie starring James Belushi and Kylie Travis

== See also ==
- Retroactive law, another term for ex post facto law
- Retroactive data structures, datum structures that allow modifications to past actions
- Retroactive continuity in fiction
- Retrospective, often synonymous when used as an adjective
