= Langerman =

Langerman is a surname. It is the surname of:

- Jean and Jo Langerman, American twin professional women's basketball players for the All-American Red Heads
- John Langerman, Mayflower passenger, servant of Christopher Martin (Mayflower passenger)
- Stefan Langerman, Belgian mathematician and computer scientist
- Tebogo Langerman (born 1986), South African footballer
