= Mohun Bagan cricket team =

Indian professional cricket club based in Kolkata, West Bengal

- Nickname(s): The Mariners

Personnel
- Chairman: Debasish Dutta
- Manager: Srinjoy Bose

Team information
- Colours: Green; Maroon
- Founded: 1920s
- Home ground: Eden Gardens
- Capacity: 66,349

History
- CAB First Division League wins: 27
- CAB Senior Knockout wins: 32
- Official website: www.themohunbaganac.com
Test kit
ODI kit
T20I kit

Mohun Bagan cricket team is an Indian professional cricket team based in Kolkata, West Bengal. It participates in various tournaments of varying age groups conducted by the Cricket Association of Bengal. The date of foundation of the cricket section is debatable but there have been mentions of the club having a cricket team from as far back as 1922. Currently the team participates in the CAB First Division League, CAB Senior Knockout, CAB Super League, Bengal T20 League and JC Mukherjee Trophy. The team plays its home matches mostly at the Eden Gardens. They have won over 110 major state-level trophies so far. In past many big names like Sourav Ganguly, Sachin Tendulkar, Virat Kohli, MS Dhoni and even Sri Lankan player Chaminda Vaas had played for this legendary club.

== Current squad ==
As of September 2020
Player(s) with international caps are listed in bold.

Name	D.O.B.	Batting style	Bowling style
Batsmen
**Manoj Tiwary**	14 November 1985 (age 39)	Right-handed	Right-arm spin
Sumanta Gupta	9 February 1991 (age 34)	Right-handed	Right-arm spin
Sudip Chatterjee	11 November 1991 (age 33)	Left-handed	Right-arm spin
Arindam Ghosh	30 April 1984 (age 41)	Right-handed	Right-arm spin
Rakesh Krishnan	23 June 1983 (age 42)	Left-handed	–
Aryasena Lahiri	15 May 2001 (age 24)	Right-handed	Right-arm spin
Jayojit Basu	14 September 1989 (age 35)	Right-handed	–
Writtick Chatterjee	28 September 1992 (age 32)	Right-handed	Right-arm spin
Wicket-keepers
Vivek Singh	1 November 1993 (age 31)	Left-handed	Right-arm pace
Debabrata Das	22 September 1993 (age 31)	Right-handed	–
Bowlers
**Mohammed Shami**	9 March 1990 (age 35)	Right-handed	Right-arm pace
Jayanta Das	24 August 1999 (age 25)	–	Left-arm spin
Turaka Kranthi	7 November 1999 (age 25)	–	Right-arm pace
Tuhin Banerjee	11 September 1992 (age 32)	Left-handed	Left-arm spin
Kumar Shyam Yadaw	12 November 1999 (age 25)	Right-handed	Right-arm pace
Sourav Mondal	5 November 1984 (age 40)	Left-handed	Left-arm pace
Ayan Bhattacharjee	17 July 1991 (age 34)	Left-handed	Right-arm pace
Rajkumar Pal	12 December 1983 (age 41)	Left-handed	Left-arm spin
Sayan Mondal	10 November 1989 (age 35)	Left-handed	Right-arm pace
Nilkantha Das	12 April 1987 (age 38)	–	Right-arm pace
Rahul Sethi	27 August 1988 (age 36)	Right-handed	Right-arm pace
Pritam Chakraborty	10 September 1994 (age 30)	Right-handed	Right-arm pace

== Honours ==
- CAB First Division League (27): 1953–54, 1959–60, 1960 – 61, 1962–63, 1963–64, 1964–65, 1965–66, 1966–67, 1968–69, 1970–71, 1974–75, 1975–76, 1976–77, 1979–80, 1981–82, 1982–83, 1984–85, 1985–86, 1986–87, 1987–88, 1988–89, 1993–94, 1995–96, 1997–98, 1999–00, 2002–03, 2017–18
- CAB Super League (2): 2015–16, 2017–18
- CAB Senior Knockout (32): 1952–53, 1953–54, 1954–55, 1955–56, 1957–58, 1958–59, 1960–61, 1963–64, 1964–65, 1968–69, 1969–1970, 1973–74, 1975–76, 1976–77, 1978–79, 1981–82, 1983–84, 1984–1985, 1986–87, 1988–89, 1989–90, 1993–94, 1994–95, 1995–96, 1998–99, 1999–00, 2001–02, 2011–12, 2012–13, 2015–16, 2016–17, 2018–19
- P. Sen Trophy (20): 1972–73, 1976–77, 1979–80, 1981–82, 1982–83, 1983–84, 1984–85, 1986–87, 1987–88, 1988–89, 1989–90, 1990–91, 1992–93, 1994–95, 1995–96, 1998–99, 2000–01, 2008–09, 2011–12, 2022–23
- J. C. Mukherjee Trophy (24): 1982–83, 1984–85, 1985–86, 1988–89, 1989–90, 1990–91, 1991–92, 1992–93, 1994–95, 1995–96, 1996–1997, 1999–00, 2000–01, 2001–02, 2002–03, 2008–09, 2010–11, 2011–12, 2012–13, 2013–14, 2015–16, 2017–18, 2018–19, 2023–24
- A. N. Ghosh Trophy (8): 1993–94, 1994–95, 1999–00, 2001–02, 2002–03, 2009–2010, 2010–11, 2011–12
