= Queap =

A queap Q with k = 6 and n = 9

In computer science, a queap is a priority queue data structure. The data structure allows insertions and deletions of arbitrary elements, as well as retrieval of the highest-priority element. Each deletion takes amortized time logarithmic in the number of items that have been in the structure for a longer time than the removed item. Insertions take constant amortized time.

The data structure consists of a doubly linked list and a 2–4 tree data structure, each modified to keep track of its minimum-priority element. The basic operation of the structure is to keep newly inserted elements in the doubly linked list, until a deletion would remove one of the list items, at which point they are all moved into the 2–4 tree. The 2–4 tree stores its elements in insertion order, rather than the more conventional priority-sorted order.

Both the data structure and its name were devised by John Iacono and Stefan Langerman.

== Description ==
A queap is a priority queue that inserts elements in O(1) amortized time, and removes the minimum element in O(log(k + 2)) if there are k items that have been in the heap for a longer time than the element to be extracted. The queap has a property called the queueish property: the time to search for element x is O(lg q(x)) where q(x) is equal to n − 1 − w(x) and w(x) is the number of distinct items that has been accessed by operations such as searching, inserting, or deleting. q(x) is defined as how many elements have not been accessed since x's last access. Indeed, the queueish property is the complement of the splay tree working set property: the time to search for element x is O(lg w(x)).

A queap can be represented by two data structures: a doubly linked list and a modified version of 2–4 tree. The doubly linked list, L, is used for a series of insert and locate-min operations. The queap keeps a pointer to the minimum element stored in the list. To add element x to list l, the element x is added to the end of the list and a bit variable in element x is set to one. This operation is done to determine if the element is either in the list or in a 2–4 tree.

A 2–4 tree is used when a delete operation occurs. If the item x is already in tree T, the item is removed using the 2–4 tree delete operation. Otherwise, the item x is in list L (done by checking if the bit variable is set). All the elements stored in list L are then added to the 2–4 tree, setting the bit variable of each element to zero. x is then removed from T.

A queap uses only the 2–4 tree structure properties, not a search tree. The modified 2–4 tree structure is as follows. Suppose list L has the following set of elements: $x_1, x_2, x_3, \dots , x_k$. When the deletion operation is invoked, the set of elements stored in L is then added to the leaves of the 2–4 tree in that order, proceeded by a dummy leaf containing an infinite key. Each internal node of T has a pointer $h_v$, which points to the smallest item in subtree v. Each internal node on path P from the root to $x_0$ has a pointer $c_v$, which points to the smallest key in $T - T_v - \{r\}$. The $h_v$ pointers of each internal node on path P are ignored. The queap has a pointer to $c_{x_0}$, which points to the smallest element in T.

An application of queaps includes a unique set of high priority events and extraction of the highest priority event for processing.

== Operations ==
Let minL be a pointer that points to the minimum element in the doubly linked list L, $c_{x_0}$ be the minimum element stored in the 2–4 tree, T, k be the number of elements stored in T, and n be the total number of elements stored in queap Q. The operations are as follows:

New(Q): Initializes a new empty queap.

Initialize an empty doubly linked list L and 2–4 tree T. Set k and n to zero.

Insert(Q, x): Add the element x to queap Q.

Insert the element x in list L. Set the bit in element x to one to demonstrate that the element is in the list L. Update the minL pointer if x is the smallest element in the list. Increment n by 1.

Minimum(Q): Retrieve a pointer to the smallest element from queap Q.

If key(minL) < key($c_{x_0}$), return minL. Otherwise return $c_{x_0}$.

Delete(Q, x): Remove element x from queap Q.

If the bit of the element x is set to one, the element is stored in list L. Add all the elements from L to T, setting the bit of each element to zero. Each element is added to the parent of the right most child of T using the insert operation of the 2–4 tree. L becomes empty. Update $h_v$ pointers for all the nodes v whose children are new/modified, and repeat the process with the next parent until the parent is equal to the root. Walk from the root to node $x_0$, and update the $c_v$ values. Set k equal to n.

If the bit of the element x is set to zero, x is a leaf of T. Delete x using the 2–4 tree delete operation. Starting from node x, walk in T to node $x_0$, updating $h_v$ and $c_v$ pointers. Decrement n and k by 1.

DeleteMin(Q): Delete and return the smallest element from queap Q.

Invoke the Minimum(Q) operation. The operation returns min. Invoke the Delete(Q, min) operation. Return min.

CleanUp(Q): Delete all the elements in list L and tree T.

Starting from the first element in list L, traverse the list, deleting each node.

Starting from the root of the tree T, traverse the tree using the post-order traversal algorithm, deleting each node in the tree.

== Analysis ==
The running time is analyzed using the amortized analysis. The potential function for queap Q will be $\phi(Q)=c|L|$ where $Q=(T, L)$.

Insert(Q, x): The cost of the operation is O(1). The size of list L grows by one, the potential increases by some constant c.

Minimum(Q): The operation does not alter the data structure so the amortized cost is equal to its actual cost, O(1).

Delete(Q, x): There are two cases.

=== Case 1 ===
If x is in tree T, then the amortized cost is not modified. The delete operation is O(1) amortized 2–4 tree. Since x was removed from the tree, $h_v$ and $c_v$ pointers may need updating. At most, there will be $O(lgq(x))$ updates.

=== Case 2 ===
If x is in list L, then all the elements from L are inserted in T. This has a cost of $a|L|$ of some constant a, amortized over the 2–4 tree. After inserting and updating the $h_v$ and $c_v$ pointers, the total time spent is bounded by $2a|L|$. The second operation is to delete x from T, and to walk on the path from x to $x_0$, correcting $h_v$ and $c_v$ values. The time is spent at most $2a|L| + O(lgq(x))$. If $c > 2a$, then the amortized cost will be $O(lgq(x))$. Delete(Q, x): is the addition of the amortized cost of Minimum(Q) and Delete(Q, x), which is $O(lgq(x))$.

== Code example ==
A small Java implementation of a queap:

public class Queap
{
    public int n, k;
    public List<Element> l; // Element is a generic data type.
    public QueapTree t;     // a 2-4 tree, modified for Queap purpose
    public Element minL;

    private Queap() {
        n = 0;
        k = 0;
        l = new LinkedList<Element>();
        t = new QueapTree();
    }

    public static Queap New() {
        return new Queap();
    }

    public static void Insert(Queap Q, Element x) {
        if (Q.n == 0)
            Q.minL = x;
        Q.l.add(x);
        x.inList = true;
        if (x.compareTo(Q.minL) < 0)
            Q.minL = x;
    }

    public static Element Minimum(Queap Q) {
        // t is a 2-4 tree and x0, cv are tree nodes.
        if (Q.minL.compareTo(Q.t.x0.cv.key) < 0)
            return Q.minL;

        return Q.t.x0.cv.key;
    }

    public static void Delete(Queap Q, QueapNode x) {
        Q.t.deleteLeaf(x);
        --Q.n;
        --Q.k;
    }

    public static void Delete(Queap Q, Element x) {
        QueapNode n;
        if (x.inList) {
            // set inList of all the elements in the list to false
            n = Q.t.insertList(Q.l, x);
            Q.k = Q.n;
            Delete(Q, n);
        }
        else if ((n = Q.t.x0.cv).key == x)
            Delete(Q, n);
    }

    public static Element DeleteMin(Queap Q) {
        Element min = Minimum(Q);
        Delete(Q, min);
        return min;
    }
}

== See also ==
- Queue (data structure)
- Splay tree
