= Mike Worboys =

British mathematician, computer scientist and composer

Michael Worboys (born 6 April 1947) is a British mathematician, computer scientist and composer.

Worboys is known for his research on the computational and mathematical foundations of Geographic Information Science (GISci) and Geographic Information Systems (GIS). In 1993 he founded the GIS Research UK (GISRUK) conference series, which is still held annually. With Matt Duckham, he wrote the well-known textbook GIS: a computing perspective. In 2010, Worboys also co-founded the open access Journal of Spatial Information Science with co-editors Matt Duckham, Jörg-Rüdiger Sack.

== Biography ==
Worboys completed his studies in England. He received a B.Sc. in mathematics at the University of Reading in 1968, a M.Sc. in mathematical logic at the University of Bristol in 1969 and a Ph.D. in mathematics at the University of Birmingham in 1980.

The Association for Computing Machinery awarded Worboys the title of Distinguished Scientist in 2006 and the University Consortium for Geographic Information Science (UCGIS) presented the 2008 Research Award to him. Worboys has also held honorary professorships at the University of Melbourne and the University of Edinburgh.

Mike is also a composer and sound artist, having an interest in both instrumental and electroacoustic music. He was awarded an MMus with Distinction in Composition at Trinity Laban Conservatoire of Music and Dance, where he worked principally with Paul Newland, Sam Hayden and Gwyn Pritchard. He has a PhD in Music by Composition at the University of Durham.

== Selected works ==
- Worboys, Michael, and Matt Duckham (2004). GIS: a computing perspective (second edition). Boca Raton: CRC Press. ISBN 0-415-28375-2.
