= Jorge Urrutia Galicia =

Mexican mathematician and computer scientist

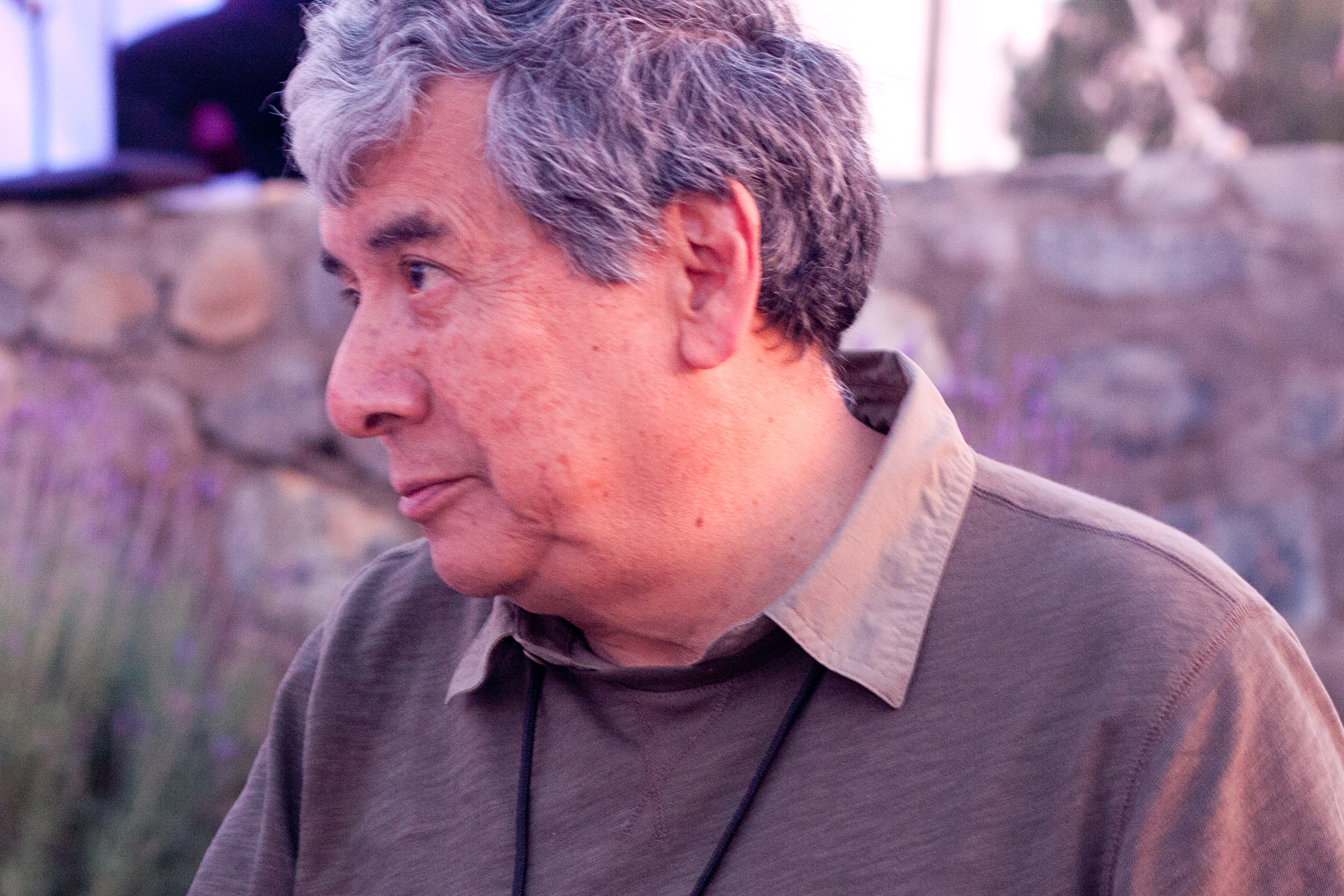
At LATIN 2016

Jorge Urrutia Galicia is a Mexican mathematician and computer scientist in the Institute of Mathematics of the National Autonomous University of Mexico (UNAM). His research primarily concerns discrete and computational geometry.

== Education and career ==
Urrutia earned his Ph.D. from the University of Waterloo in 1980, under the supervision of Ronald C. Read. He worked for many years at the University of Ottawa before moving to UNAM in 1999. With Jörg-Rüdiger Sack in 1991, he was founding co-editor-in-chief of the academic journal Computational Geometry: Theory and Applications.

== Recognition ==
Urrutia is a member of the Mexican Academy of Sciences. The Mexican Conference on Discrete Mathematics and Computational Geometry, held in 2013 in Oaxaca, was dedicated to Urrutia in honor of his 60th birthday.

== Selected publications ==
- Golumbic, Martin Charles; Rotem, Doron; Urrutia, Jorge (1983), "Comparability graphs and intersection graphs", Discrete Mathematics, 43 (1): 37–46, doi:10.1016/0012-365X(83)90019-5, MR 0680302
- Hurtado, Ferran; Noy, Marc; Urrutia, Jorge (1999), "Flipping edges in triangulations", Discrete & Computational Geometry, 22 (3): 333–346, doi:10.1007/PL00009464; preliminary version in Proceedings of the Twelfth Annual Symposium on Computational Geometry (SoCG 1996), doi:10.1145/237218.237367
- Kranakis, Evangelos; Singh, Harvinder; Urrutia, Jorge (1999), "Compass routing on geometric networks" (PDF), Proceedings of the 11th Canadian Conference on Computational Geometry, UBC, Vancouver, British Columbia, Canada, August 15-18, 1999
- Sack, Jörg-Rüdiger; Urrutia, Jorge, eds. (2000), Handbook of Computational Geometry, North Holland / Elsevier, doi:10.1016/b978-0-444-82537-7.x5000-1, ISBN 978-0-444-82537-7
- Bose, Prosenjit; Morin, Pat; Stojmenovic, Ivan; Urrutia, Jorge (2001), "Routing with guaranteed delivery in ad hoc wireless networks", Wireless Networks, 7 (6): 609–616, doi:10.1023/A:1012319418150; preliminary version in Proceedings of the 3rd International Workshop on Discrete Algorithms and Methods for Mobile Computing and Communications (DIAL-M 1999), doi:10.1145/313239.313282
- Dobrev, Stefan; Durocher, Stephane; Eftekhari, Mohsen; Georgiou, Konstantinos; Kranakis, Evangelos; Krizanc, Danny; Narayanan, Lata; Opatrny, Jaroslav; Shende, Sunil; Urrutia, Jorge (2015), "Complexity of barrier coverage with relocatable sensors in the plane", Theoretical Computer Science, 579: 64–73, CiteSeerX 10.1.1.719.1857, doi:10.1016/j.tcs.2015.02.006, MR 3327587; preliminary version in Proceedings of the 8th International Conference on Algorithms and Complexity (CIAC 2013), doi:10.1007/978-3-642-38233-8_15
