= Pat Morin =

Canadian computer scientist

Patrick Ryan Morin is a Canadian computer scientist specializing in computational geometry and data structures. He is a professor in the School of Computer Science at Carleton University.

== Education and career ==
Morin was educated at Carleton University, earning a bachelor's degree with highest honours in 1996, a master's degree in 1998, and a Ph.D. in 2001. His dissertation, Online Routing in Geometric Graphs, was jointly supervised by Jit Bose and Jörg-Rüdiger Sack. After postdoctoral research at McGill University, he returned to Carleton University as a faculty member in 2002.

== Contributions ==
Morin has published highly-cited work on geographic routing in geometric graphs, including unit disk graphs and triangulations, with coauthors including Jit Bose, Erik Demaine, Stefan Langerman, and Jorge Urrutia. With Joachim Gudmundsson, he co-founded the Journal of Computational Geometry, and continues as its managing editor. He is the author of an open textbook on data structures, Open Data Structures.
