= Langerman Diamonds =

Belgian natural color diamond company

- Type: Private limited company (SRL)
- Industry: Diamond trading, jewelry
- Founded: 1965; 61 years ago
- Founder: Arthur Langerman
- Headquarters: Antwerp, Belgium
- Area served: Worldwide
- Key people: Stefan Langerman (CEO)
- Products: Natural color diamonds, color diamond jewelry
- Website: langerman-diamonds.com
- Footnotes; Legal name: Langerman SRL

Langerman Diamonds is the trading name of Langerman SRL, a Belgian diamond company based in the Antwerp diamond district that specializes in natural color diamonds. The business was founded in 1965 by the diamond dealer Arthur Langerman.

== History ==
Arthur Langerman began working in an Antwerp diamond-cutting workshop as a teenager and founded his own company in 1965. The Belgian financial daily L'Echo has described him as a pioneer of color diamonds and the leading specialist in the field.

As of 2021, the company was led by Arthur Langerman's son, Stefan Langerman, as chief executive. The business operates through Langerman SRL, a private limited company registered with Belgium's Crossroads Bank for Enterprises in June 2018 under enterprise number 0698.590.139 and authorized as a registered diamond dealer. It has been a member of the Responsible Jewellery Council since October 2025 and holds RJC certification valid from July 2026 to July 2029.
