= List of East Bengal FC players =

East Bengal FC was formed in 1920 and has been one of the most successful football teams in India. Since establishment, it has seen numerous legends of Indian football like Ahmed Khan, Tulsidas Balaram, Sudhir Karmakar, Monoranjan Bhattacharya, Krishanu Dey, Bhaichung Bhutia etc. play the famous Red and Gold outfit to numerous prestigious titles and honours through the various generations. This is a list of the East Bengal FC players since the establishment in 1920.

== Key ==
*	Club record holder
‡	Played their entire career at East Bengal
**Name in bold**	Currently playing for East Bengal

== List of East Bengal players ==
Name	Nationality	Position	Career	Captaincy	Notes
Nagen Kali	India	Goalkeeper	1920–1921	—	
M. Talukdar	India	Goalkeeper	1920–1935	—	
B. Sen	India	Defender	1920	—	
N. Gossain	India	Defender	1920	—	
Gostha Pal	India	Defender	1920	—	
P. Bardhan	India	Midfielder	1920		
S. Das	India	Midfielder	1920		
S. Tagore	India	Midfielder	1920		
J. Mukherjee	India	Midfielder	1920		
Ramesh Chandra Sen	India	Forward	1920–1922	1920–1921	
S. Bose	India	Forward	1920		
C. Bose	India	Forward	1920		
A. Roy	India	Forward	1920		
A. Bannerjee	India	Forward	1920		
D. Pal	India	Forward	1921–1923		

== See also ==
- East Bengal F.C. (women)
- East Bengal Club (cricket)
