= Víctor Neumann-Lara =

Mexican mathematician

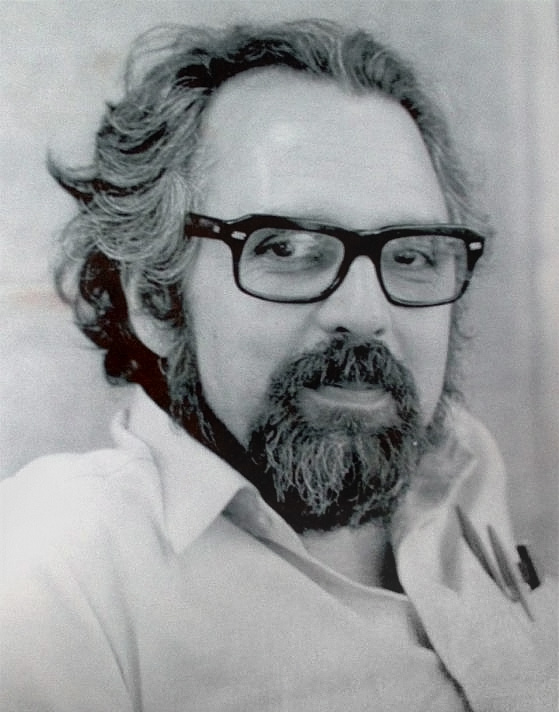
Víctor Neumann-Lara by A. Bondy

Víctor Neumann-Lara (1933–2004) was a Mexican mathematician and a pioneer in the field of graph theory in Mexico. His work also covers general topology, game theory and combinatorics.

== Biography ==
Born in the city of Huejutla, Hidalgo, Mexico, he soon moved to Mexico City, where he received his bachelor's degree in mathematics from the School of Sciences, UNAM.

His life was greatly devoted to teaching, giving over 100 courses in Mexico and around the world, and introducing new teaching methods. He carried color chalks with him all the time, and was prompt to give graphic explanations.

== Work ==
Full Professor at the Institute of Mathematics, UNAM, he directed over 15 theses and taught both in the Institute and in the Faculty of Sciences. Below is a selection of his multiple publications, which earned him over 120 citations from renowned mathematicians in the area of graph theory.

In 1982 he introduced the notion of a dichromatic number of a digraph, which would eventually be used in kernel theory and tournament theory.

== Selected publications ==
- Francisco Larrión, Víctor Neumann-Lara, Miguel A. Pizaña, Thomas Dale Porter "A hierarchy of self-clique graphs" Discrete Mathematics 282(1–3): 193–208 (2004)
- M. E. Frías-Armenta, Víctor Neumann-Lara, Miguel A. Pizaña "Dismantlings and iterated clique graphs" Discrete Mathematics 282(1–3): 263–265 (2004)
- Xueliang Li, Víctor Neumann-Lara, Eduardo Rivera-Campo "On a tree graph defined by a set of cycles" Discrete Mathematics 271(1–3): 303–310 (2003)
- Juan José Montellano-Ballesteros, Víctor Neumann-Lara "An Anti-Ramsey Theorem" Combinatorica 22(3): 445–449 (2002)
- Francisco Larrión, Víctor Neumann-Lara "On clique divergent graphs with linear growth" Discrete Mathematics 245(1–3): 139–153 (2002)
- Francisco Larrión, Víctor Neumann-Lara, Miguel A. Pizaña "Whitney triangulations, local girth and iterated clique graphs" Discrete Mathematics 258(1–3): 123–135 (2002)
- Francisco Larrión, Víctor Neumann-Lara, Miguel A. Pizaña "On the homotopy type of the clique graph" J. Braz. Comp. Soc. 7(3): 69–73 (2001)
- Francisco Larrión, Víctor Neumann-Lara "Locally C6 graphs are clique divergent" Discrete Mathematics 215: 159–170 (2000)
- Manuel Abellanas, G. Hernandez, Rolf Klein, Víctor Neumann-Lara, Jorge Urrutia "A Combinatorial Property of Convex Sets" Discrete & Computational Geometry 17(3): 307–318 (1997)
- Manuel Abellanas, G. Hernandez, Rolf Klein, Víctor Neumann-Lara, Jorge Urrutia "Voronoi Diagrams and Containment of Families of Convex Sets on the Plane" Symposium on Computational Geometry 71–78 (1995)
- Jorge L. Arocha, Javier Bracho, Víctor Neumann-Lara "Tight and Untight Triangulations of Surfaces by Complete Graphs" J. Comb. Theory, Ser. B 63(2): 185–199 (1995)
- Víctor Neumann-Lara, Eduardo Rivera-Campo "Spanning trees with bounded degrees" Combinatorica 11(1): 55–61 (1991)
- Roland Häggkvist, Pavol Hell, Donald J. Miller, Víctor Neumann-Lara "On multiplicative graphs and the product conjecture" Combinatorica 8(1): 63–74 (1988)
- Víctor Neumann-Lara, H. Galeana-Sánchez "On kernel-perfect critical digraphs" Discrete Math. 59: 257–265 (1986)
- Víctor Neumann-Lara, N. Santorro, Jorge Urrutia "Uniquely colourable m-dichromatic oriented graphs" Discrete Math. 62: 65–70 (1986)
- Víctor Neumann-Lara, Luis Montejano "A variation of Menger's theorem for long paths" J. Combin. Theory Ser. B 36: 213–217 (1984)
- Víctor Neumann-Lara, Jorge Urrutia "Vertex critical r-dichromatic tournaments" Discrete Math. 49: 83–87 (1984)
- Víctor Neumann-Lara, H. Galeana-Sanchez "On kernels and semikernels of digraphs" Discrete Math. 48: 67–76 (1984)
- Víctor Neumann-Lara "The dichromatic number of a digraph" J. Combin. Theory Ser. B 33: 265–270 (1982)
- Víctor Neumann-Lara "k-Hamiltonian graphs with given girth" Colloq. Math. Soc. János Bolyai 10: 1133–1142 (1975)
