= Antisemitica =

Objects or images depicting negative stereotypes of Jews

Antisemitica are images, texts or objects that depict or describe negative stereotypes of Jews, often driven by hatred, devaluation and degradation.

Several paraphernalia of Antisemitica have been assembled during the late 20th century and been given to respectable institution for scientific work and responsible exhibitions. In the fields of book collecting, and rare book dealing, the term designates the collection and distribution of books, pamphlets, serials, posters, and other printed literature, of an antisemitic nature.

== Motives for viewing and collecting ==
Antisemitica does not, generally, designate antisemitic activity, or antisemites themselves. In the United States, the freedom of the press does not limit the publication or distribution of antisemitic literature, and there are scholarly and historical interests in such material. Nevertheless American Museums are very reluctant to collect and exhibit such objects.

Several, often Jewish, collectors declared it was their intention to take the material off the market. Arthur Langerman described that he was guided by his attempt to understand the history and the geography of antisemitism. Another Jewish collector, Peter Ehrenthal, noted “a sadistic or masochistic trait to it”.

== Collections ==
Noteworthy collections of Antisemitica have been assembled by Simon Cohen (London), Peter Ehrenthal (New York City), Arthur Langerman (Antwerp) and Martin Schlaff (Vienna). The Schlaff Collection, consisting of about 5,000 objects, was donated to the Jewish Museum Vienna in 1993. The Cohen Collection was exhibited in 2010 at the Jewish Cultural Centre in London and the Ehrenthal Collection was shown in 2012 at the Wolfson Museum of Jewish Art in Jerusalem. The Langerman Collection consists of about 8,000 posters, drawings, paintings, postcards, statuettes and other examples of visual antisemitism from four centuries. In 2019 the collection was donated to Technische Universität Berlin, it is based at its Center for Research of Antisemitism. In 2022, the Langerman Foundation acquired about 800 antisemitic postcards from the estate of Peter Ehrenthal who had died in January 2022 at the age of 101.

The Price Library of Judaica at the University of Florida has a collection of written Antisemitica that includes close to 300 books and pamphlets. The Jewish Theological Seminary Library holds several pamphlets and periódica from the United States and England including manuscripts and notes from antisemitic immigrant Arthur Cherep-Spiridovich.

The Felix Posen Bibliographic Project on Antisemitism, an electronic version of the Antisemitism – An Annotated Bibliography published by De Gruyter Saur from 1984 to 2013, lists some 50,000 items, both written works as well visual arts.

== See also ==
- Antisemitic trope
- Bibliophilia
