= Computational Geometry (journal) =

- Discipline: Computational geometry
- Language: English
- Edited by: Jörg-Rüdiger Sack; Tamara Mchedlidze; Hee-Kap Ahn

Publication details
- Publisher: Elsevier
- Frequency: Quarterly
- Impact factor: 0.597 (2014)

Standard abbreviations
- ISO 4: Comput. Geom.

Indexing
- ISSN: 0925-7721 (print); 1879-081X (web)

Links
- Journal homepage; Online access

Computational Geometry, also known as Computational Geometry: Theory and Applications, is a peer-reviewed mathematics journal for research in theoretical and applied computational geometry, its applications, techniques, and design and analysis of geometric algorithms. All aspects of computational geometry are covered, including the numerical, graph theoretical and combinatorial aspects, as well as fundamental problems in various areas of application of computational geometry: in computer graphics, pattern recognition, image processing, robotics, electronic design automation, CAD/CAM, and geographical information systems.

The journal was founded in 1991 by Jörg-Rüdiger Sack and Jorge Urrutia. It is indexed by Mathematical Reviews, Zentralblatt MATH, Science Citation Index, and Current Contents/Engineering, Computing and Technology.
