= Mohammed Shami =

Indian cricketer

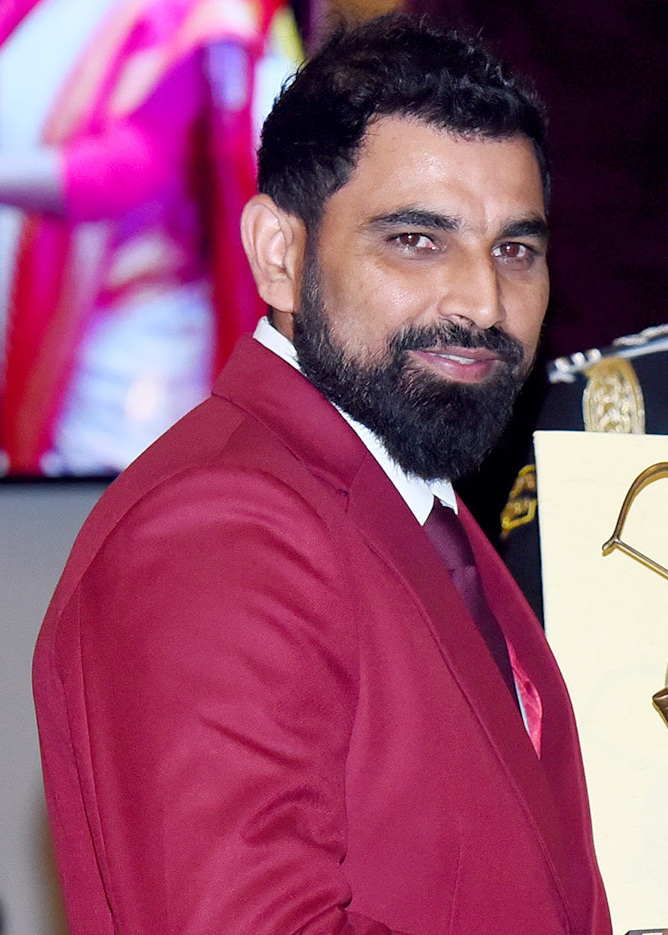
- Shami in 2024

Personal information
- Full name: Mohammed Shami Ahmed
- Born: 3 September 1990 (age 36); Amroha, Uttar Pradesh, India
- Nickname: Lala
- Batting: Right-handed
- Bowling: Right-arm fast
- Role: Bowler

International information
- National side: India (2013–present)
- Test debut (cap 279): 6 November 2013 v West Indies
- Last Test: 7 June 2023 v Australia
- ODI debut (cap 195): 6 January 2013 v Pakistan
- Last ODI: 9 March 2025 v New Zealand
- ODI shirt no.: 11
- T20I debut (cap 46): 21 March 2014 v Pakistan
- Last T20I: 2 February 2025 v England
- T20I shirt no.: 11

Domestic team information
- Years: Team
- 2008–present: Mohun Bagan
- 2010/11–present: Bengal
- 2013: Kolkata Knight Riders
- 2014–2018: Delhi Daredevils
- 2019–2021: Kings XI Punjab
- 2022–2023: Gujarat Titans
- 2025: Sunrisers Hyderabad
- 2026: Lucknow Super Giants

Career statistics
Competition	Test	ODI	T20I	FC
Matches	64	108	25	97
Runs scored	750	225	6	1,194
Batting average	12.09	7.75	3.00	12.57
100s/50s	0/2	0/0	0/0	0/3
Top score	56*	25	6	56*
Balls bowled	11,515	4,995	510	18,281
Wickets	229	206	27	376
Bowling average	27.71	24.05	28.18	26.28
5 wickets in innings	6	6	0	15
10 wickets in match	0	0	0	2
Best bowling	6/56	7/57	3/15	8/90
Catches/stumpings	16/–	32/–	1/–	25/–
Medal record
Men's cricket
Representing India
ICC World Test Championship
Runner-up	2019–2021
Runner-up	2021–2023
ICC Cricket World Cup
Runner-up	2023 India
ICC T20 World Cup
Runner-up	2014 Bangladesh
ICC Champions Trophy
Winner	2025 Pakistan
Runner-up	2017 England & Wales
ACC Asia Cup
Winner	2016 Bangladesh
Winner	2023 Pakistan
- Source: ESPNcricinfo, 12 February 2026

Mohammed Shami Ahmed (Note: In his early career, Shami was often referred to as Shami Ahmed in media reports.) (Hindi: [ʃʌmiː]; born 3 September 1990) is an Indian international cricketer who plays as a right-arm fast-bowler for the India national cricket team, for the Bengal cricket team in domestic cricket, and for the Lucknow Super Giants in the Indian Premier League. He also plays for Mohun Bagan in domestic competitions of West Bengal.

One of the most consistent wicket takers in contemporary world cricket, Shami bowls the ball off the seam and uses swing, including reverse swing, to move the ball both directions. He has been reputed to have an edge in the death overs of a limited-overs innings and, in all formats, has been described as being at times "unplayable". Shami finished as the tournament's leading wicket taker in the ICC World Cup 2023, and was also the fastest bowler to take 50 wickets in the 48-year history of the Cricket World Cup, spanning 13 editions. He is the recipient of the 2023 Arjuna Award for Cricket. Having taken 7 wickets for 57 runs against New Zealand in the 2023 Cricket World Cup semi-final, he holds the record for the best figures for an Indian Bowler in ODIs and is currently the only Indian bowler to have taken 7 wickets in an ODI innings. Shami was a member of the Indian team that won the 2025 ICC Champions Trophy.

== Early life and career ==
Shami grew up in the village of Sahaspur in Amroha, Uttar Pradesh, one of five children. His father, Tauseef Ali (Note: Shami's father's name is also sometimes spelled Tousif.) was a farmer who had been a fast bowler in his youth. When Shami was 15 he was taken to Badruddin Siddique, a cricket coach in Moradabad, a town 22 kilometres (14 mi) from his home.

When I first saw him [Shami] bowling at the nets as a 15-year-old kid, I knew this boy is not ordinary. So I decided to train him. For one year I prepared him for the UP trials, as we don't have club cricket over here. He was very co-operative, very regular and very hard working. He never took a day off from training. During the under 19 trials he bowled really well, but due to politics, he missed out on selection. They asked me to bring him next year, but at that moment I didn't want Shami to miss one year. So I advised his parents to send him to Kolkata.

— Badruddin Siddique on Mohammed Shami

Shami worked hard on his technique throughout his time at Moradabad; after matches, he would request the used balls so that he could develop the ability to reverse swing the older ball, a skill that would be integral to his success later in his career. He was not, however, selected for the Uttar Pradesh under-19 team, and later in 2005 Badruddin sent him to Kolkata to increase his chances of selection for a state team. After playing for the Dalhousie Athletic Club, he was recommended to Debabrata Das, a former assistant secretary of the Cricket Association of Bengal, who was impressed with Shami's bowling and asked him to join his own club, Town Club. Das took Shami, who had no place to stay in Kolkata, to live with him. After bowling well for Town Club, Das asked one of the Bengal selectors, Sambaran Banerjee, to watch Shami bowl; Banerjee was impressed and selected him for the Bengal under-22 team.

Shami never wanted money. His goal was the stumps, the sound that comes from hitting the stumps. Ever since I saw him, most of his wickets were bowled. He bowls with an upright seam, on or just outside off stump, and gets it to cut back in.

— Debabrata Das on Mohammed Shami

Shami later joined Mohun Bagan Cricket Club, one of the best teams in Bengal, in order to be considered for selection to the full state team. He bowled to former Indian captain Sourav Ganguly in the Eden Gardens nets; Ganguly recommended him to the state selectors and, soon afterwards, Shami was included in the Bengal squad for the 2010–11 Ranji Trophy.

== Domestic career ==
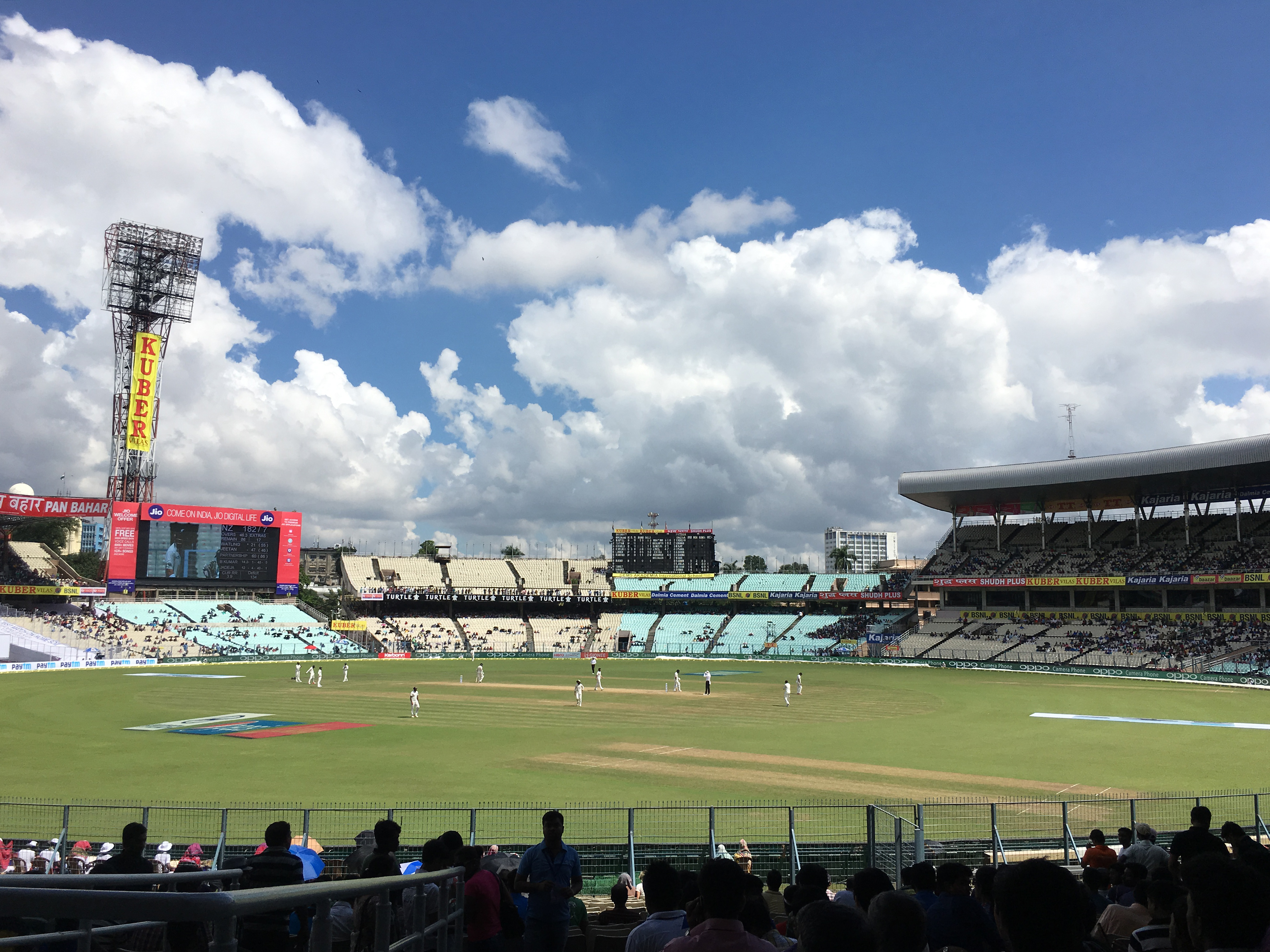
Eden Gardens, Bengal's home ground and where Shami made both his first-class and Test match debuts

Shami took four wickets on his senior debut for Bengal in a Twenty20 match in October 2010. The following month, he made his first-class cricket debut against Assam at Eden Gardens, taking three wickets in a high scoring match.

In February 2012 his bowling helped East Zone win their first Duleep Trophy title; he took eight wickets in the match and was described as "outstanding, consistently getting bounce and zip from just short of a good length". He had only played in the match following an injury to Abu Nechim, but it proved to be a significant breakthrough in Shami's career; he had been described as "little-known" before the match, but by April was being touted as a player to watch in the upcoming Indian Premier League season.

He was selected to tour the West Indies with the India A team and "impressed" with his bowling on pitches which were considered to be generally unhelpful to fast bowlers. Shami was considered to have been the "surprise package" of the tour for India A, and impressed the team's coach Lalchand Rajput with his strength and consistency whilst bowling, as well as with his batting; batting tenth in the first unofficial Test match, he scored 27 runs in a partnership of 73 with Cheteshwar Pujara which won the match for India A. Later in the year he was one of only two fast bowlers retained for the India A tour of New Zealand, although he only played in two of the six matches on the tour.

During the 2012–13 Ranji Trophy, Shami took 11 wickets in a match against Madhya Pradesh in November, including seven wickets for 79 runs (7/79) in the first innings, a return which included a hat-trick. The following month he took 4/36 and 6/71 against Hyderabad on a green wicket at Eden Gardens, his second ten-wicket match in only his 15th first-class game. (Note: As of November 2021, these remain the only two ten-wicket matches in Shami's career.) In the five Ranji Trophy matches he played during the season he took 28 wickets at a bowling average of 21.25 runs per wicket, and in the 18 first-class matches he played before his Test match debut in 2013 he took 71 wickets, an average of four wickets each match.

Since making his international debut in 2013, Shami has played only occasionally for his state team. He played a limited overs match in March 2017 after not having played any competitive cricket for a period of four months, and took part in four Ranji Trophy matches later in 2017, his first for around five years, to develop and maintain his fitness. A single first-class match for Bengal followed in 2018—with the BCCI requesting that he be limited to bowling no more than 15 overs in each innings in the match to ensure his fitness for an upcoming Test series. Shami has not played for Bengal since 2018/19 season.

== International cricket ==
=== Test career ===
==== 2013 to 2018 ====
Shami made his Test debut against West Indies in November 2013 in front of his home crowd at Eden Gardens, Kolkata. In the first innings, he took his maiden Test wicket – that of Kieran Powell – and finished with figures of 4/71. In the second innings, he took 5/47. His match total of nine wickets, for 118 runs, is the most by an Indian pacer on debut, surpassing Munaf Patel's seven wickets for 97 runs at Mohali in 2006.

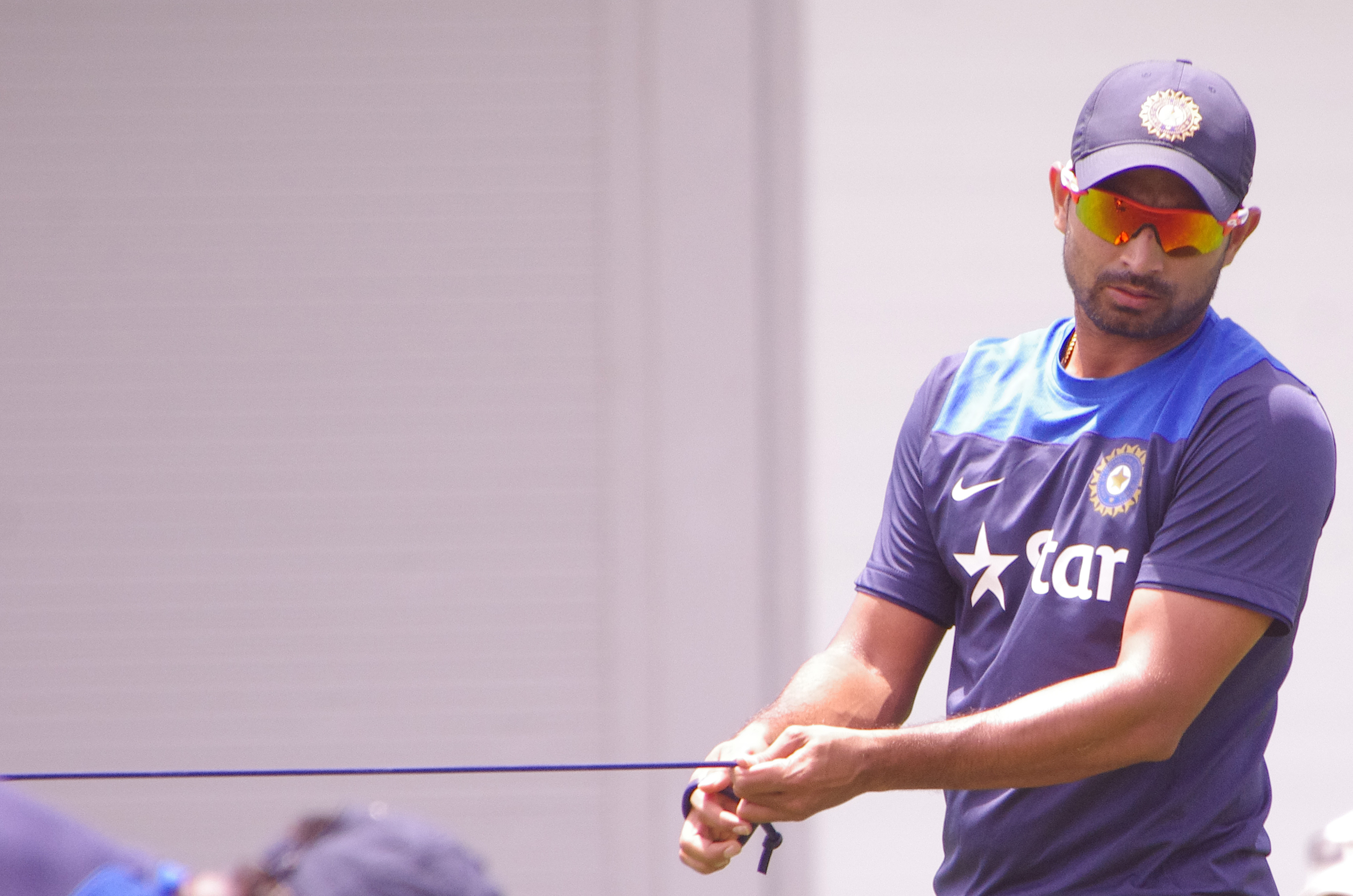
Shami warming up before a match against Australia in Sydney Cricket Ground in 2015

Shami had little success on India's 2014 tour of England, however, finishing with just five wickets in three matches. He was involved in a 111-run partnership for the 10th wicket, with Bhuvneshwar Kumar in the first Test at Trent Bridge, scoring his maiden half-century in the process and helping India post 457 in the first innings.

He took 15 wickets in three Tests during India's 2014–15 tour of Australia, and went on to become the 20th Indian fast bowler to take 100 Test wickets, reaching the milestone in 29 Tests.

In 2018, he toured England with India, playing in all five Tests. He finished the series with 16 wickets, including six in the fourth Test.

==== 2019–21 ICC World Test Championship ====
During the 2019–21 ICC World Test Championship, in the 2019 India-West Indies two-match Test series, Shami took nine wickets. He took thirteen in the home series against South Africa (2019) and five in New Zealand (2020). He was included in the playing XI of the first international pink ball Test match organised in India, at Eden Gardens, the second Test of the 2019–20 Bangladesh tour of India, in which he took two wickets. During this series, Shami reached seventh position in the ICC Men's Player Rankings after taking seven wickets in the first Test. His rating of 790 points was then the third-best achieved by an India pace bowler, behind only Kapil Dev (877) and Jasprit Bumrah (832). During the 2020–21 tour of Australia, Shami suffered a broken arm while batting against Pat Cummins during the second innings of the first Test. He retired hurt and was ruled out of the rest of the series.

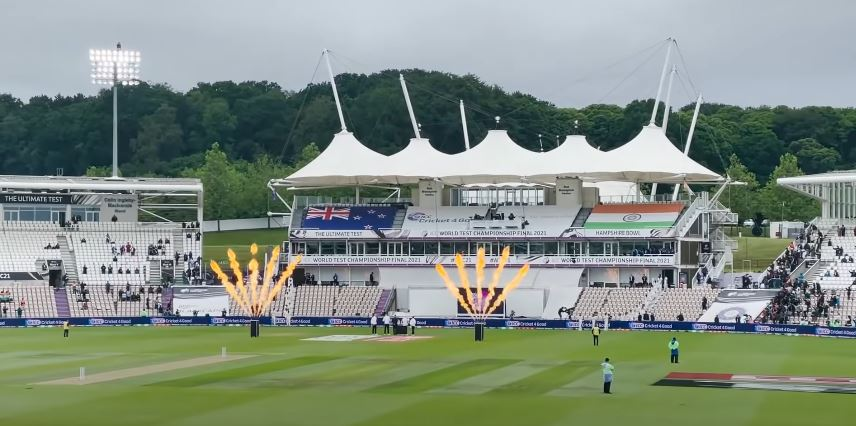
The Rose Bowl during the final of 2019–21 WTC ––– Shami was part of that match.

Shami was the joint-tenth highest wicket taker in the tournament, along with Jofra Archer, with 40 wickets in total. He was the highest wicket taker among the Indian pacers and the second highest of all Indian bowlers, behind only Ravichandran Ashwin.

Shami played in the Test Championship final against New Zealand at The Rose Bowl in Southampton. He took four wickets in the first innings, but New Zealand won the match by 8 wickets.

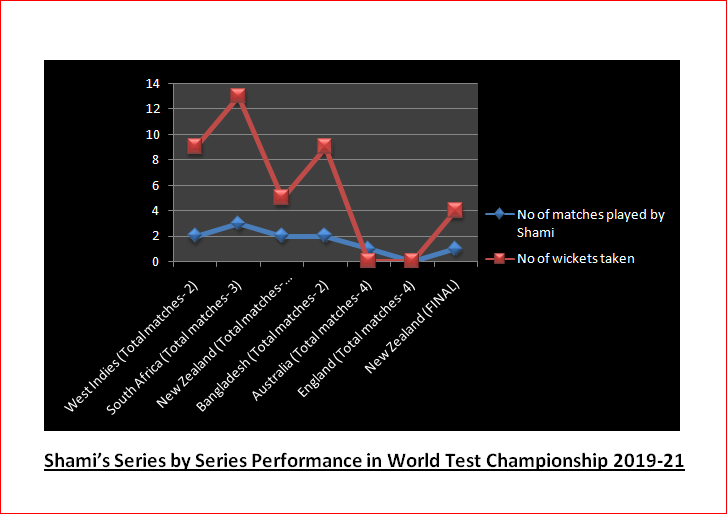
A graph showing performance made by Shami in each and every series of Team India in 2019–21 WTC

==== 2021–23 ICC World Test Championship ====
During the 2021–23 ICC World Test Championship, in the 2021 India-England series, on 16 August 2021, in India's second innings, Shami made his highest score and second half-century in Test cricket, with an unbeaten score of 56* in a partnership with Jasprit Bumrah, which helped team India to script a historical win against England. Playing 3 matches in the 5-match series, Shami finished as the fifth highest wicket-taker of the series with 11 wickets with the best figures of 4/95 coming during the first innings of the third match of the series.

During the first innings of the first Test of the India-South Africa 2021–22 Test series, Shami took 5 wickets for 44 runs and became the fifth Indian pacer (and with the fewest number of deliveries – 9896) to take 200 wickets in Test cricket. For his performances, the former head coach of India, Ravi Shastri lauded him as 'The Sultan of Bengal' on Twitter. At the end of the match, which India eventually won, the Test captain of team India, Virat Kohli eulogised Shami for taking 8 wickets total in the match saying "For me he's in the best three seamers in the world at the moment." He finished the series with 14 wickets from 3 matches as the leading wicket taker of India in the series.

On 6 November, 2026, Shami announced his retirement from Test cricket.

=== ODI career ===
As a result of his performances in domestic matches, Shami was selected for India's One Day international (ODI) series against Pakistan, replacing his Bengali teammate Ashok Dinda and subsequently made his debut in the third ODI of the series in Delhi on 6 January 2013 and he returned figures of 1/23 from 9 overs in a low-scoring game that India won by 10 runs. In October 2013, he was selected in India's squad to face the touring Australians. After being left out of the team for the first three ODI matches, he played in all the remaining matches, taking seven wickets, including two three-wicket hauls and emerged as the fourth leading wicket-taker of the series.

In India's tour of New Zealand in 2014, Shami took 11 wickets in ODIs at an average of 28.72. He ended the 2014 Asia Cup with 9 wickets at 23.59.

After losing the 2014 Test series by 3–1 against England, India won the ODI series by 3–1 in which Shami took 8 wickets at 24.16. In 5th ODI he bowled a good spell in the death overs, with tight line and length and middle-stump yorkers. After the match, cricket pundits called him the future of Indian bowling.

Shami took 10 wickets at 17.40 against West Indies in October 2014. In the 2nd ODI of the series he got his best bowling figure in ODIs as he picked up 4 wickets for 36 runs in his 9.3 overs.

He was in the 15-man squad for 5 ODIs against Sri Lanka in November 2014, but he was replaced by Dhawal Kulkarni due to a toe injury he suffered during the West Indies series.

For his performances in 2014, he was named in the World ODI XI by the ICC. Hat-trick in World Cup – Mohammad Shami has taken a hat-trick in the ICC Cricket World Cup, making him one of the few Indian bowlers to achieve this feat. Key role in ICC tournaments – His performance in the 2015, 2019, and 2023 Cricket World Cups has been exceptional.

==== 2015 Cricket World Cup ====
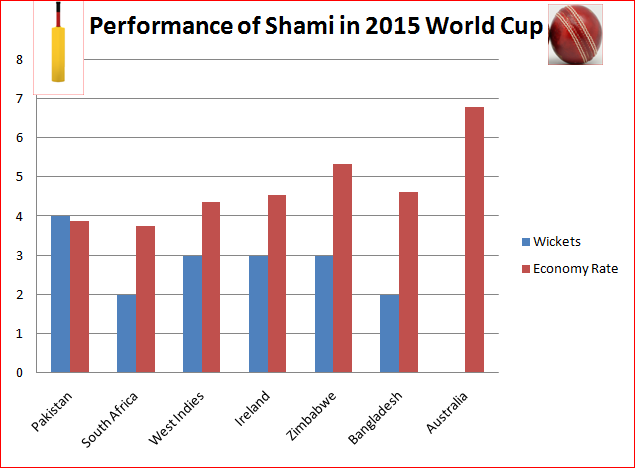
A bar chart showing Shami's bowling performance in 2015 World Cup

Shami was in the 15-man squad named for the 2015 Cricket World Cup and was eventually included in the playing XI. He took 4 wickets for 35 runs from his 9 overs in India's first match against Pakistan, helping India win the match. Against West Indies, he was awarded the Man of the Match after finishing with figures 8–2–35–3. He had a good game in the next as well, against Ireland, finishing with 3/41 from 9 overs. In the last of the league games, against Zimbabwe, he took another 3-wicket haul giving away 48 runs from his 9 overs which included two maidens. India went on to win all the league games. He took a brace against Bangladesh in the quarter final but had a poor game against Australia in the semi-final, which India lost, where he gave away 68 runs off 10 overs without picking a wicket, thus finishing the tournament with 17 wickets at an average of 17.29 and an economy rate of 4.81 as the fourth leading wicket-taker. In June, after the conclusion of the tournament, Shami revealed that he bowled through a recurring pain in his left knee. He later underwent a surgery. For his performances in 2015, he was named in the World ODI XI by the ICC.

Shami returned to the squad for the 2017 ICC Champions Trophy after a two-year hiatus due to a shoulder injury. But due to lack of game time, he did not feature in any of the matches of the tournament.

==== 2019 New Zealand tour ====
In January 2019, during the tour of New Zealand, Shami claimed his 100th ODI wicket in first of the five games by bowling Martin Guptill. He reached this milestone in his 56th match, an Indian record previously held by Irfan Pathan, who completed 100 ODI wickets in his 59th match. As of January 2022, the world record is held by Afghanistan leg-spinner, Rashid Khan, who needed only 44 games to reach the mark.

Playing in four games throughout the series, Shami took nine wickets at an average of 15.33 and was named man of the series. According to Sportstar, this series rejuvenated the white ball career of Shami, helping him to book a spot in the 2019 Cricket World Cup squad.

==== 2019 Cricket World Cup ====
In April 2019, he was named in India's squad for the 2019 Cricket World Cup for his performances in the white ball cricket. He was one of the only three fast bowlers to feature in the squad, the other two being Jasprit Bumrah and the white ball specialist, Bhuvneshwar Kumar. On 22 June 2019, in the match against Afghanistan, Shami took a hat-trick and became the ninth cricketer and the second Indian bowler after Chetan Sharma to claim a hat-trick in a World Cup match. On 30 June 2019, in the match against England, Shami took his first five-wicket haul in ODIs and became the first Indian bowler to take consecutive three four-wicket hauls in the World Cup, with 4/40 against Afghanistan, 4/16 against West Indies and 5/69 against England. After playing well in 4 back to back matches, the decision to select Bhuvneshwar Kumar over Shami raised eyebrows among the cricket pundits, who expressed their displeasure on the decision on Twitter. Although Shami featured only in 4 matches, he took 14 wickets, making him the 12th-highest wicket taker in the tournament, and the second best Indian, behind Jasprit Bumrah (who took 18 wickets in 9 matches). He had the best bowling strike rate of 15.07 and the best average of 13.78 of all the bowlers in the tournament with at least six overs bowled.

With 42 wickets from 21 matches in 2019, Shami finished the year as the leading wicket-taker in ODIs.

==== 2020 to 2023 ====
Shami was part of the three match ODI series between India and Australia in 2020, which team India eventually won by 2–1 margin. After going wicketless in the first match, he took 7 wickets in the next two matches and finished the series as the leading wicket-taker. Following the series, Shami's ability to bowl yorkers persistently and taking wickets during the powerplay and death overs were greatly applauded. In December 2020, he was included in the squad for India's tour of Australia, taking four wickets in the two ODIs he played in.

Shami was included in India's 15-man squad for the 2023 Asia Cup. He played his first match in this series against Nepal replacing Jasprit Bumrah who had to leave the squad and return to Mumbai for personal reasons. In September 2023, in the first ODI of Australia's tour of India, ahead of the 2023 Cricket World Cup, Shami took 5/51 which was his best ODI return at that point.

==== 2023 Cricket World Cup ====
Benched during the first four matches of 2023 World Cup, Shami made his first appearance against New Zealand in Dharamshala and took 5/54 winning the Player of the Match award. He then followed it up with another match-winning haul of 4/22 against England in Lucknow in a low-scoring match, helping India to defend 229. He took 5/18 in Mumbai against Sri Lanka and was awarded Player of the Match. His fifth wicket in this match was his 45th in World Cup matches, overtaking the Indian record of 44 previously held by Zaheer Khan and Javagal Srinath.

Shami returned his best ODI figures with his 7/57 against New Zealand in the semi-final at the Wankhede Stadium on 15 November. He was again awarded the Player of the Match and became the first Indian bowler to reach 50 World Cup wickets (in 17 innings), and the first Indian bowler to claim a 7 wicket-haul in a World Cup match. In the same match, he also set the record for the most hauls of four wickets in World Cup matches for any bowler (8), and the most five-wicket hauls (4), surpassing Mitchell Starc. Shami finished the World Cup as the leading wicket-taker with 24 wickets in 7 innings. He surpassed the record of most wickets by an Indian in a single edition of the World Cup, going past Zaheer Khan's tally of 21 in the 2011 edition.

==== 2025 ICC Champions Trophy ====
Making his comeback after a long injury absence, and due to the injuries to Jasprit Bumrah and Mohammad Siraj, Shami led the Indian bowling attack at the Champions Trophy. In the first group game against Bangladesh, Shami starred with figures of 5/53, in the process becoming the fastest bowler to 200 ODI Wickets, and the highest wicket taking Indian bowler in ICC tournaments, surpassing Zaheer Khan.

=== T20I career ===
Shami made his debut in Twenty20 Internationals (T20I) on 21 March 2014 against Pakistan in the opening match of the 2014 T20 World Cup and took the wicket of Umar Akmal, to give him figures of 1/31 in 4 overs bowled. He played the next two matches, but was then dropped for the rest of the tournament.

He was included in the team in 2014 tour of England, following the Test series, in July. He played in the lone match of the series and finished with 3 wickets conceding 38 runs. Shami returned to the squad for 2016 ICC World Twenty20 after spending more than two years recuperating from the shoulder injury, but due to lack of form and game time, he did not feature in any of the matches of the tournament.

==== 2021 T20 World Cup ====
Although Shami had not performed as well in T20Is as he had in the other two formats, he was picked in the 2021 ICC Men's T20 World Cup for his performances in three consecutive Indian Premier League seasons. He was one of the three fast bowlers in the main squad, the other two being Jasprit Bumrah and the white-ball specialist, Bhuvneshwar Kumar.

Discussing the inclusion of Shami in team India's squad, Cricinfo wrote: "Bowling at the death is probably what gave Shami an edge over Deepak Chahar and Shardul Thakur [both in the reserves], (Note: Shardul Thakur was later included in the main squad inplace of Axar Patel.) who have had greater success up top. Shami has got 14 death-over wickets since IPL 2020, which is the same as Deepak Chahar, Shardul Thakur and Mohammed Siraj combined. He can move the ball both ways, as he's shown ample times in the past, and as a bonus, he has the undefinable ability to be unplayable regardless of format when he gets into his rhythm".

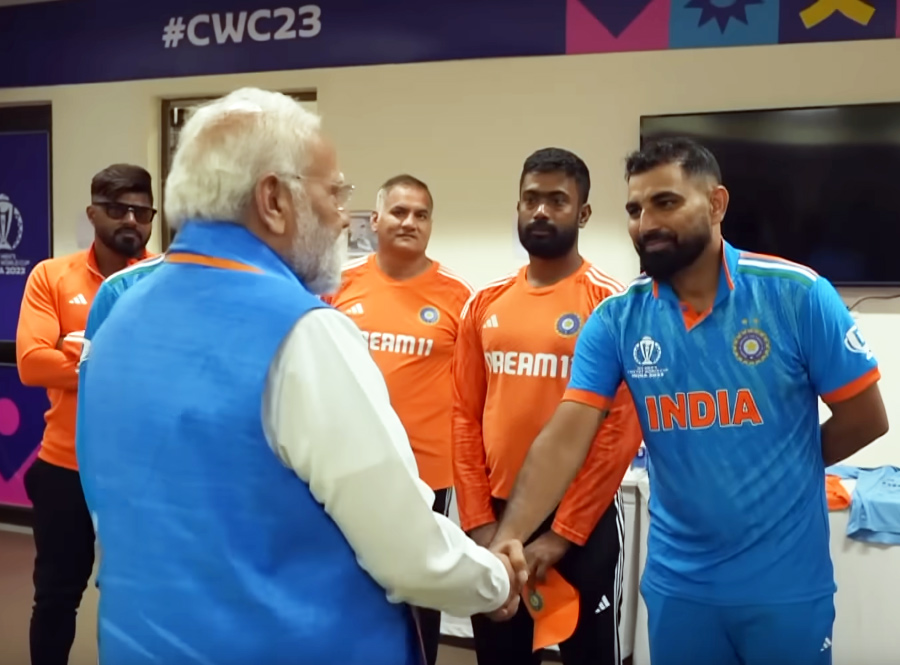
Shami meeting Narendra Modi in 2023

Shami went wicketless in the first two matches of the tournament, before setting career-best figures in consecutive matches against Afghanistan (with the figures of 3/32) and Scotland with 3/15.

==== 2022 T20 World Cup ====
Shami was initially placed on stand-by for 2022 T20 World Cup, but after Jasprit Bumrah was ruled out of the tournament after sustaining a back injury he was named as Bumrah's replacement. Shami finished the tournament with 6 wickets.

== Indian Premier League ==
Performances in the IPL
Season	Team	Matches	Wickets
2013	Kolkata Knight Riders (KKR)	3	1
2014	Delhi Daredevils (DD) (Note: Delhi Daredevils changed the name of the franchise to Delhi Capitals (DC) after the 2018 season.)	12	7
2015	Delhi Daredevils (DD)	– (Note: Shami did not play in the 2015 IPL due to injury.)	–
2016	Delhi Daredevils (DD)	8	5
2017	Delhi Daredevils (DD)	8	5
2018	Delhi Daredevils (DD)	4	3
2019	Kings XI Punjab (KXIP)	14	19
2020	Kings XI Punjab (KXIP)	14	20
2021	Punjab Kings (PBKS) (Note: Kings XI Punjab changed the name of the franchise to Punjab Kings in 2021.)	14	19
2022	Gujarat Titans (GT)	16	20
2023	Gujarat Titans (GT)	16	28
Total		109	127
As of 8 June 2023 – Source: CricketArchive

Shami was signed by Kolkata Knight Riders, an Indian Premier League (IPL) franchise, in 2011; Kolkata's head coach Dav Whatmore had worked with the Bengal Cricket Association and had identified Shami, who had played Twenty20 matches for Bengal, as a player with potential. He played a single match for the team in the 2011 Champions League Twenty20, but despite being touted as a player likely to make an impact ahead of the 2012 tournament, he did not play in the IPL until 2013, making three appearances for Kolkata during the season.

Ahead of the 2014 season teams were allowed to retain a maximum of five players, and, following his international debut, Shami was signed by Delhi Daredevils in the player auction. He played in 12 of Delhi's 14 matches during the season, taking seven wickets; (Note: The 2014 IPL season was split between the United Arab Emirates and India.) he was retained but did not play a match the following season after being ruled out with a knee injury. He played sporadically in the IPL during the following three seasons, making eight appearances for Delhi in 2016 and 2017 and just four in 2018 when he was again hampered by a knee injury.

After being released by Delhi ahead of 2019 season Shami was bought by Kings XI Punjab in the 2019 player auction. Fit again, he and was the team's leading wicket-taker against Mumbai Indians at Wankhede Stadium, a feat he repeated the following season when he took 20 wickets, the best return of his career. During the season he allowed only five runs during a super over against Mumbai Indians, taking the match, which Punjab eventually won, into a second super over. This was the first time in IPL history that a single-digit score had been defended in a super over and earned Shami praise for the way in which he bowled precise yorkers under pressure.

In the 2021 season, Shami took 19 wickets in 14 matches and finished as Punjab's leading wicket-taker for the third straight season and as the fifth highest wicket-taker in that year's competition. During the season he became the fourth bowler in franchise history to take 50 wickets for Punjab. Ahead of the 2022 IPL auction he was, however, released by the team.

He was purchased by Gujarat Titans, a newly formed franchise, for ₹6.25 crore (equivalent to ₹7.2 crore or US$770,000 in 2026) from the marquee group of players. He took 20 wickets at an economy rate of 8.00 runs per over during the season as Gujarat won the league title in their first season. He set new career best T20 bowling figures in IPL 2023, taking his first four-wicket haul in the format against Delhi. The same season, he won the Purple Cap (leading wicket-taker) for the first time, with 28 wickets from 17 matches, besides being the leading wicket-taker in the powerplay in a season in the history of the league, taking 17 wickets in all during the phase.

Official jersey of Shami's IPL team- Gujarat Titans

== IPL 2026 ==
In November 2025, ahead of IPL 2026, Shami joined Lucknow Super Giants after he was traded to them from Sunrisers Hyderabad.

== Bowling style ==
Shami is a right-arm fast bowler who has the ability to move the ball off the seam and using swing, including reverse swing, to move the ball both ways. He has bowled persistently at around 141 km/h (88 mph), with his highest bowling speed being 153.2 km/h against Australia during the 2014 series at MCG.

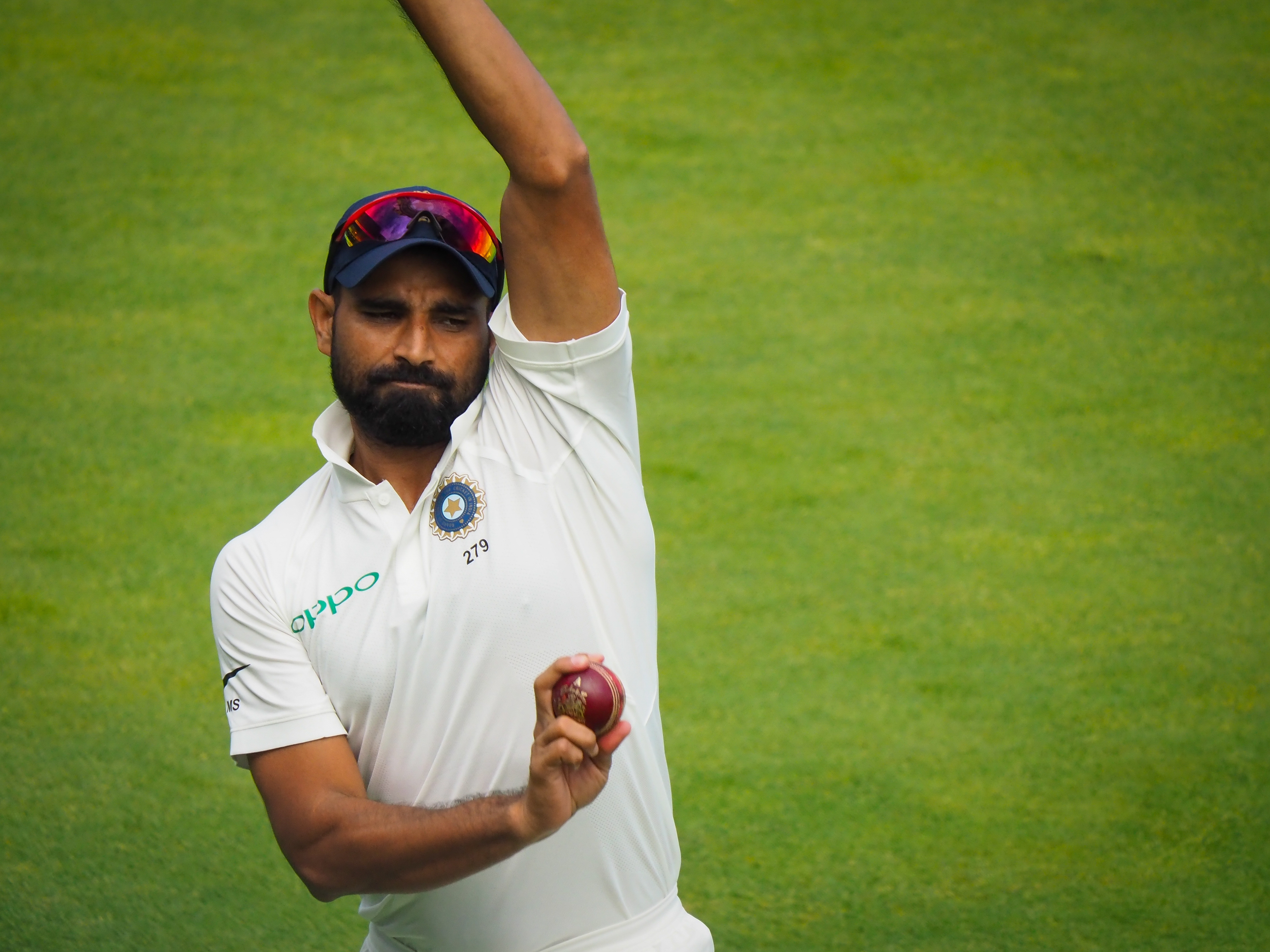
Position of Shami's fingers while bowling

According to Cricinfo, the secret of Shami's success lies in his wrist, with his run-up and action being quite smooth. Earlier he used to be accused of straying to leg once too often in search of wickets, but now he has shifted the line of attack to the left ever so slightly. As a result, when he bowls in the channel, he really does bowl in the channel. His wicket-taking ability and bowling reverse swing make him one of the most lethal bowlers in the world and which is why he has been described as 'unplayable' at times regardless of the formats. Recently, he became one of the fastest Indian bowlers to take 5 wickets in a match.

If you are constantly (bowling) in the right areas, attacking these batsmen, it creates more and more pressure, and they are more liable to make mistakes. So that is Shami’s real strength.

— Michael Holding on Shami's wicket taking consistency

Shami's ability of bowling yorkers continuously at much needed times has been discussed and praised by several former cricketers and critics.

You can see that from the way he adapts to different pitches and adjusts his length. He now knows on which surface to pitch it up and on what track to bowl the good length.

— Former Indian bowling coach, Bharat Arun, who has worked extensively with Shami

== Outside cricket ==
Shami's father and his three brothers all played cricket, with one brother, Mohammed Kaif (not to be confused with the former international cricketer Mohammad Kaif), making his List A debut for Bengal in 2021. During the COVID-19 lockdown in India in 2020 Shami trained alongside his brother in their home village of Sahaspur. During the lockdown Shami and his family helped to provide food for people in their village.

Shami married Hasin Jahan in 2014. The couple have one child. In 2020 Shami spoke about the impact that injuries and a string of allegations made by his wife that have made on his mental health. He spoke of considering suicide on three occasions and credited his family with supporting him through the period.

In November 2023, Shami rescued an accident victim on a hilly road near Nainital, earning the tag of 'Samaritan'.

=== Domestic abuse allegations ===
In March 2018, a First Information Report was lodged against Shami and members of his family by his wife, Hasin Jahan, citing domestic violence and adultery. Shami was charged with offences relating to domestic violence, attempted murder, poisoning and criminal intimidation. Shami denied all of the allegations, stating that they were a conspiracy and had been made to distract him from cricket. The Board of Control for Cricket in India (BCCI) withheld Shami from their national contracts list as a result of the allegations. His wife also claimed that Shami had been involved in match-fixing. This was investigated by the anti-corruption unit run by the BCCI and on 22 March the board reinstated Shami's national contract, clearing him of the corruption charges.

On 2 September 2019, a court in Alipore issued an arrest warrant against Shami in connection to the domestic violence charges, providing him with 15 days after his return to India to turn himself in. (Note: Shami was touring the West Indies with the Indian team at the time the arrest warrant was issued.) The warrant was stayed by a district court on 9 September because the court that had issued the warrant failed to issue a summons to appear in court after filing the charge sheet. (Note: In India, an arrest warrant should only be filed after the defendant fails to appear before the court after having been issued with a summons.) In July 2025, the Calcutta High Court ordered Indian cricketer Mohammad Shami to pay ₹4 lakh per month in interim maintenance—₹1.5 lakh to his estranged wife, Hasin Jahan, and ₹2.5 lakh to their daughter—amid ongoing domestic violence proceedings.

=== Victim of online abuse ===
In October 2021, Shami, the only Muslim player in India's team at the time, became victim to an online trolling campaign and was subjected to a range of abuse, much of it Islamophobic, on social media following India's loss to Pakistan during the 2021 ICC Men's T20 World Cup. He had conceded 43 runs during the match and was India's most expensive bowler. Several current and former cricketers, including India's then captain, Virat Kohli, publicly supported Shami following the abuse, with Kohli specifically addressing the Islamophobic nature of the abuse Shami had received. Pakistani cricketers including Mohammad Rizwan came out in support of Shami as well.

== Awards ==
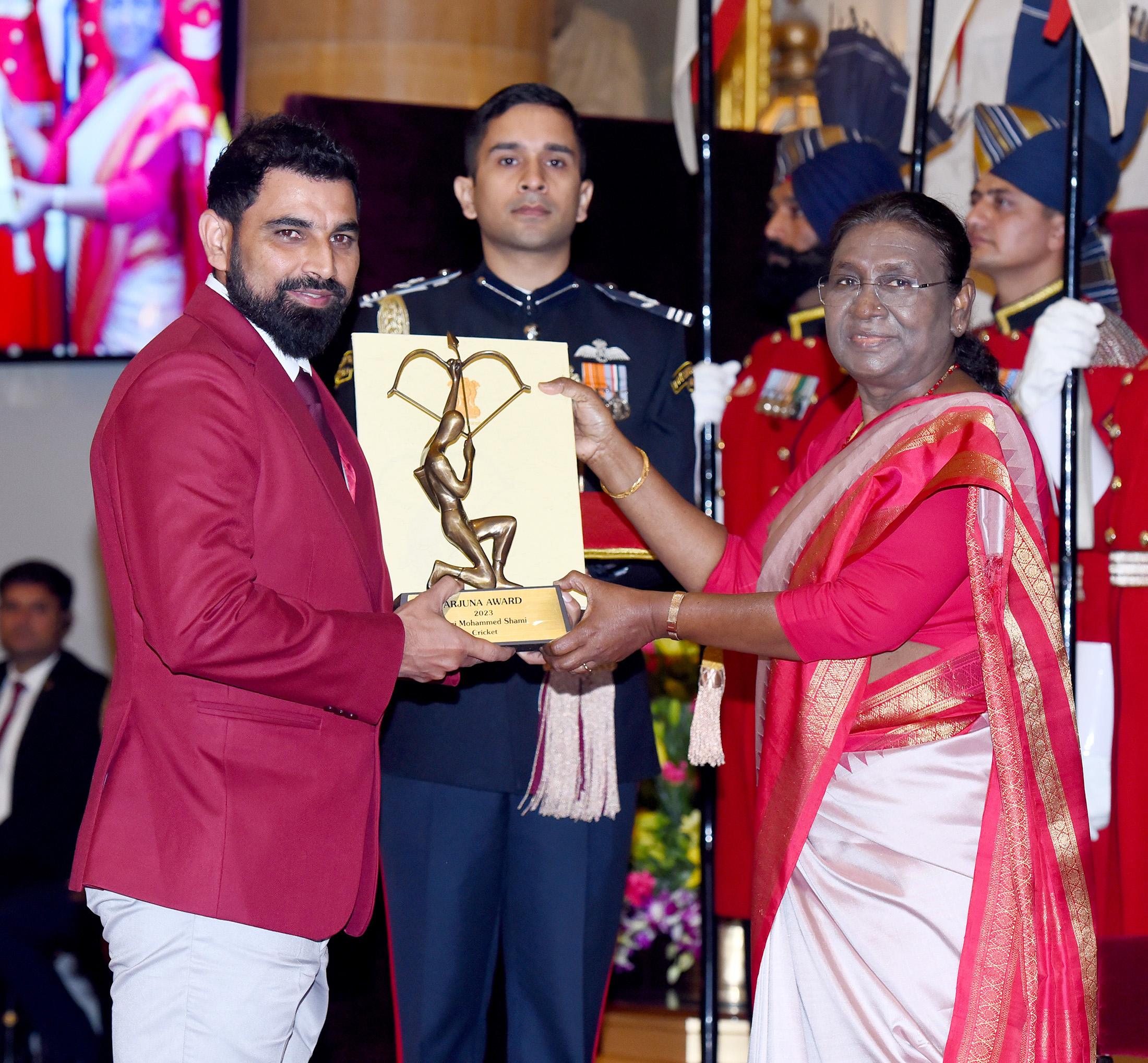
Shami receiving the Arjuna Award from President Droupadi Murmu in January 2024

Shami received the Arjuna Award from the President of India on 9 January 2024. It is the second highest award for sports in India.

== See also ==
- List of India cricketers who have taken five-wicket hauls on Test debut
