= Narayana Rao =

Narayana Rao or Narayanarao may refer to:

- Dasari Narayana Rao (1942–2017), Telugu film director and Parliamentarian
- G. V. Narayana Rao (born 1953), Telugu film/TV actor, producer
- C. H. Narayana Rao Indian film actor (1937–1984), producer
- Chitrapu Narayana Rao (1913–1985), Indian film director
- Huilgol Narayana Rao (1884–1971), Kannada poet and playwright
- Kaloji Narayana Rao (1914–2002), Indian freedom fighter and political activist of Telangana
- Karri Narayana Rao (1929-2002), Indian parliament member
- Narayana Rao (cricketer) (born 1940), cricketer who played for Andhra
- T. Narayana Rao (born 1959), Indian laparoscopic surgeon
- Uppalapati Narayana Rao (born 1958), Indian film director
- Narayana Rao (author), Indian author, critic, researcher, translator
