= Journal of Spatial Information Science =

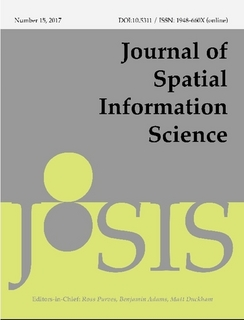
- Discipline: Geographical information science
- Language: English
- Edited by: Ross Purves, Benjamin Adams, Somayeh Dodge

Publication details
- History: 2010–present
- Publisher: University of Maine (United States)
- Frequency: Biannually
- Open access: Yes
- License: Creative Commons Attribution 3.0
- Impact factor: 2.3 (2025)

Standard abbreviations
- ISO 4: J. Spat. Inf. Sci.

Indexing
- ISSN: 1948-660X
- OCLC no.: 920407707

Links
- Journal homepage; Online archive

Journal of Spatial Information Science is a peer-reviewed open access academic journal covering geographical information science. It is published by the University of Maine and the editors-in-chief are Ross Purves, Benjamin Adams, and Somayeh Dodge. Mike Worboys, Matt Duckham, and Jörg-Rüdiger Sack were the founding editors of the journal when it was established in 2010.

== Abstracting and Indexing ==
The journal is abstracted and indexed in Scopus and the Emerging Sources Citation Index. According to the Journal Citation Reports, the journal has a 2025 impact factor of 2.3.
