= Prasenjit Sen =

- Born: 11 January 1956 (age 70)
- Occupations: Professor and former rector at Jawaharlal Nehru University, New Delhi
- Spouse: Nirupa Sen

Prasenjit Sen (born 11 January 1956) is a professor at the School of Physical Sciences of Jawaharlal Nehru University, New Delhi, India.

== Education ==
Sen received the bachelor's degree in physics from Indian Institute of Technology (IIT), Kharagpur, India. Subsequently, he obtained the master's degree in physics (condensed matter physics specialization) from IIT, Kharagpur, India based on a thesis on "Search for T Centers in Alkali Halides". His doctorate in science from Indian Institute of Science (IISc.), Bangalore, India based on his dissertation on "Investigation of Solids and Surfaces by techniques of Electron Spectroscopy" in 1985.

== Career ==
Sen is currently professor in School of Physical Sciences JNU. He was rector of JNU. He was Guest Research Scientist, KFA, Julich, West Germany prior to joining JNU. He taught courses in the field of electronics, atomic and molecular physics, condensed matter physics (theory), physics laboratory (electronics) and modern experiments. His current research interests included condensed matter physics: electronic properties, surfaces, MoV Ion interaction with solids/surfaces, many body process, nonlinear transport of energy in condensed matter, artificially reordered structure including nano structures and biological nano structures; MEMS pressure sensors; and quantum dots. He was fellow of the Indian National Academy of Engineering (FNAE) 2009 and presently sole FNAE from JNU. Sen has authored more than 110 research papers with ~1000 citations (articles include peer-reviewed Proceedings of the Materials Research Society, US and has several patents to his credit).
