= Narayana Reddy =

Narayana Reddy or Narayana Reddi may refer to:

- C. Narayana Reddy (1931–2017), Indian poet and writer
- G. Narayan Reddy (1926–1998), Indian politician and Member of Parliament of India
- Ravi Narayana Reddy (1908–1991), Indian communist freedom fighter
- Narayana Reddy, central figure of the YouTube channel Grandpa Kitchen
