= SWAT and WADS conferences =

Scandinavian Symposium and Workshops on Algorithm Theory
- Abbreviation: SWAT
- Discipline: Algorithms

Publication details
- Publisher: LZI LIPIcs; Springer LNCS
- History: 1988–
- Frequency: biennial

Algorithms and Data Structures Symposium
- Abbreviation: WADS
- Discipline: Algorithms

Publication details
- Publisher: Springer LNCS
- History: 1989–
- Frequency: biennial

WADS, the Algorithms and Data Structures Symposium, is an international academic conference in the field of computer science, focusing on algorithms and data structures. WADS is held every second year, usually in Canada and always in North America. It is held in alternation with its sister conference, the Scandinavian Symposium and Workshops on Algorithm Theory (SWAT), which is usually held in Scandinavia and always in Northern Europe. Historically, the proceedings of both conferences were published by Springer Verlag through their Lecture Notes in Computer Science series. Springer continues to publish WADS proceedings, but starting in 2016, SWAT proceedings are now published by Dagstuhl through their Leibniz International Proceedings in Informatics.

== History ==
The first SWAT took place in 1988, in Halmstad, Sweden. The first WADS was organised one year later, in 1989, in Ottawa, Ontario, Canada. Until 2007, WADS was known as the Workshop on Algorithms and Data Structures, and until 2008, SWAT was known as the Scandinavian Workshop on Algorithm Theory.

== See also ==
- The list of computer science conferences contains other academic conferences in computer science.
