= T. Narayana Rao =

Indian surgeon

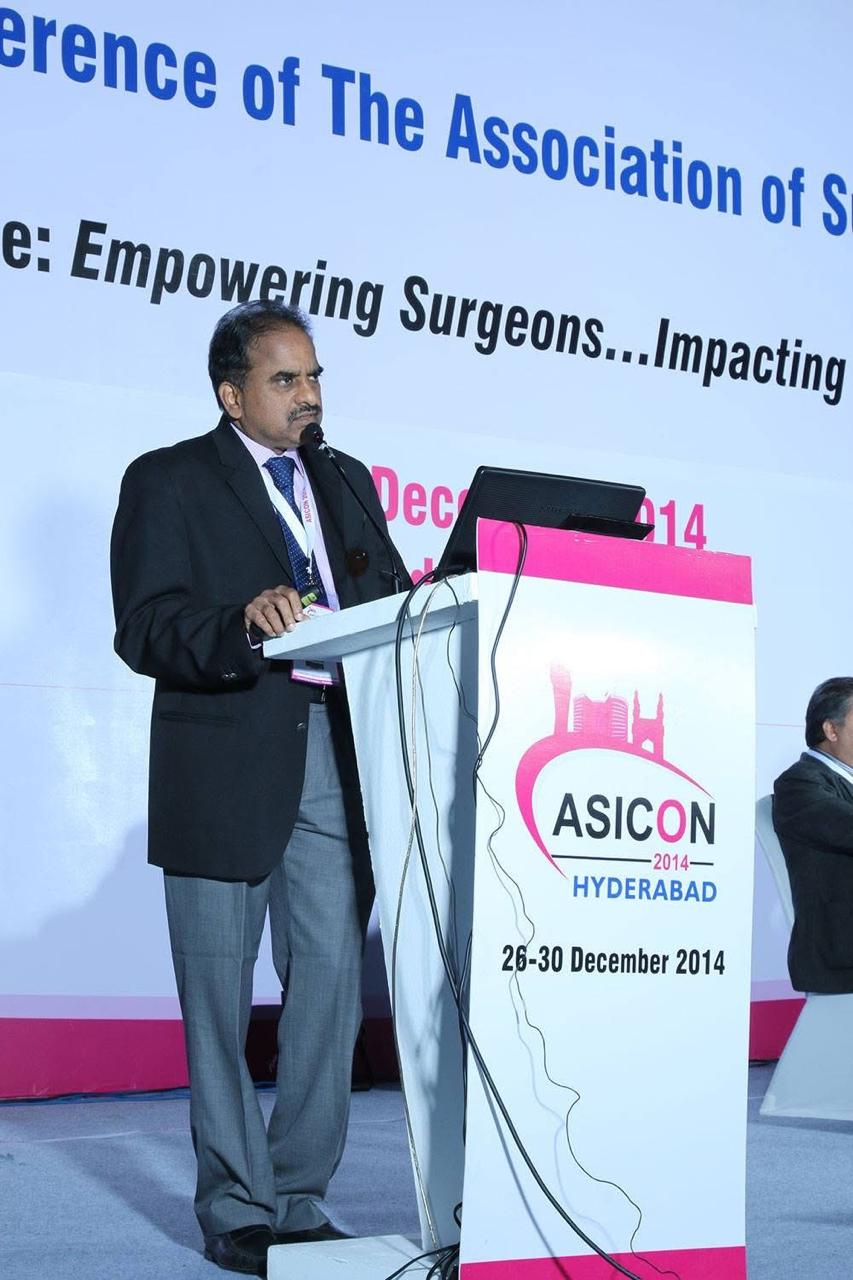
ASICON 2014 _ Hyderabad

T. Narayana Rao M.B.B.S., MS FICS, FACS, FRCS Glasgow is Formerly Professor of Surgery, Andhra Medical College, and chief surgeon at King George Hospital, bariatric surgeon of Visakhapatnam. Started Visakha Obesity Surgery Center, Founder - chairman and managing director of a Multi Speciality Hospital, Narayana Medciti, Visakhapatnam, Member of Governing Council and Hon Jn secretary of ASSOCIATION of Surgeons of India.

== Early life ==
He graduated from Andhra Medical College in 1984. He had completed postgraduation in Surgery from Guntur Medical College. Trained at Weill Medical College Presbyterian Hospital Sloan-Kettering Memorial Hospital New York, US.

== Career ==
He has joined as Civil Assistant Surgeon under Andhra Pradesh Health Services in 1990. He became assistant professor of surgery at Andhra Medical College in 1992 and promoted to associate professor of surgery in 2004. He became Professor of Surgery at Andhra Medical College from August 2008 onwards.

He was trained at the Weill Cornell Medical College, Presbyterian Hospital, and Sloan-Kettering Memorial Hospital, New York, US. He has visited the University civil Hospital and IRCAD-EITS, Strasbourg, France and underwent training there in Natural Orifice Transluminal Endosurgery. He started his practice in 1992. He is now a general, laparoscopic and bariatric surgeon. He has performed many surgeries that are unique and first of their kind in Andhra Pradesh; he is the first person to introduce key hole surgery and single port (scarless surgery) and laparoscopic colorectal surgery-and Bariatric surgery – to coastal Andhra Pradesh and Rayalaseema.

He has organised many health camps in remote places of Andhra Pradesh, Orissa and Chhattisgarh and worked in rural India for many years, treating many poor patients in that period. He has organised several camps to reach out the poor.

He has presented papers at various national and international conferences and has delivered guest lecturers at national conferences. He has chaired sessions in national and international conferences. He has published papers in national and international journals. He has organised a workshop in Laparscopic surgery (MAS-2004, Taj Residency Vizag). He also organised Mid Term conference of Indian Association of Surgical Gastroenterology (IASG) on 27 March 2011 at Gateway Taj Hotel Visakhapatnam. He worked as a faculty in Adayar Cancer Institute at Chennai and as a visiting doctor to Tata Memorial Hospital. He is a National faculty for skill course F MAS and FIAGES.He helped in the development of open – heart surgery dept. in King George hospital in the year 1998, and formerly he was in-charge of the department of the cardio-thoracic and vascular surgery. He has been elected as governing council member in Association of Surgeons of India 2013–2018. He is the first surgeon to perform Bariatric surgery in Andhra Pradesh.

Convenor for the first live Bariatric surgery transmission from Miami USA to Kolkata (OSSICON 2008)

Organizing Chairman International Hepato Pancreatic Biliary Association Indian section Midterm Conference at Gateway hotel Vizag 26 to 27 Nov. 2016

Organising chairman CME-Proctology ACRSI south zone meet at Four point by Sheraton Visakhapatnam on 16th Feb 2020.

First person to perform Robotic Hernioplasty in Andhra Pradesh, 2021.

Founder, Chairman & Managing Director of a Multi Speciality Hospital, Narayana Medciti - Visakhapatnam.

== Awards ==
- He was awarded the Rangachari Gold Medal in Surgery from Andhra University.
- He was awarded the "Rashtriya Rattan Award" for Excellence in medical profession by the Honorable Governor Bhishma Narain Singh in the year 2005.
- He was awarded Professor (Dr) Madhab Chandra Dandapat Oration award and Gold medal 2010 from Orissa state chapter of ASI and Berhampur Surgeons Association.
- He was awarded " BHARATH JYOYHI AWARD" for his meritorius services, outstanding performance and remarkable role in medicine and society by the former governor Bhishma Narain Singh and former Chief election Commissioner GVG Krishnamurthi in the year 2011.
- He was awarded " SRI RAJIV GANDHI-EXCELLENCE AWARD" FOR HIS MERITORIOUS SERVICES TO THE NATION AND EXCELLENCE IN MEDICAL FIELD BY HONORABLE GOVERNOR PONDICHERRY Lt IQBAL SINGH IN THE YEAR 2011.
- Best Citizens of India award 2011.
- Sri N Yuvaraj IAS, District Magistrate and Collector(Visakhapatnam) awarded the certificate of merit on 26th Feb 2015 the Republic Day on the behalf of Chief Minister(Andhra Pradesh) for the meritorious services rendered by Association of Surgeons of India(As Governing council Member ASI)in the HUDHUD Cyclone 2014
- He was facilitated by APASI Governing Body in 2016 at Visakhapatnam for serving the AP Chapter ASI
- He was awarded SUSRUTHA award by CHENNAI city branch Association of Surgeons of India chapter in 2017.
- Awarded & Delivered Kompella Suryanaraya Murthii Endowment Oration and felicitated by association surgeons of India AP chapter at Guntur on 5/9/2025.
- Renowned surgeon wins Lifetime Achievement Award - https://www.thehindu.com/news/national/andhra-pradesh/renowned-surgeon-wins-lifetime-achievement-award/article71451442.ece

== Memberships and positions held ==
- Founder, Chairman & Managing Director of a Multi Speciality Hospital, Narayana Medciti - Visakhapatnam.
- Formerly Professor of Surgery.
- Fellow of Royal college of surgeons FRCS(Glasgow UK)
- Member Governing Council – ASI 2012 to 2018.
- Hon.Secretary in secretary Association of the surgeons of India 2017&18.
- E.C SAARC SURGICAL CARE SOCIETY 2018–2020.
- Associate editor Indian journal of Surgery 2017–2019.
- Visiting Fellow, Tata Memorial Centre, Bombay 1989
- Faculty of Adyar Cancer Institute, Madras, 1988 to 1990
- Fellow, Gastroenterology at the International College of Surgeons, Chicago, 1995
- Civil Assistant Surgeon, Government of Andhra Pradesh, 1990 to 1991
- Assistant Professor of Surgery at Andhra Medical College, 1992 to 2004
- Associate Professor of Surgery at Andhra Medical College, 2004 to July 2008
- Professor of Surgery at Andhra Medical College, August 2008 onwards
- Fellow of the American College of Surgeons
- Fellow of the Royal College of Surgeons Glasgow
- Member, Society of American Gastrointestinal and Endoscopic Surgeons (SAGES)USA.
- Member, Association of Surgeons of India ( http://asiindia.org/ )
- Member, Indian association of endocrine surgeons
- Member, Association of Gastrointestinal Surgeons of India
- Member, Gastrointestinal and Endoscopic Surgeons of India
- Member, Minimal Access Surgeons of India
- Member, Indian Medical Association
- Member, International Gastro Club
- Member, Hernia Society of India
- Member, Pioneer Circle Minimally Invasive Procedure for Haemorrhoids and prolapse
- Member European Association of Tele surgery Strasbourg France.
- Member, Association Of Obesity surgery society Of India OSSI
- Member, International Federation for the Surgery of Obesity And Metabolic Disorders (IFSO)
- Member, INTERNATIONAL BARIATRIC CLUB.
- Member The Association of Colon Rectal Surgeons of India
