= Narayana Pillai =

Narayana Pillai may refer to:

- M. P. Narayana Pillai, Indian writer
- Naraina Pillai, Singaporean businessman
- Paravur T. K. Narayana Pillai, Indian politician
