= V. Narayanan =

V. Narayanan may refer to:

- V. Narayanan (engineer) (born 1964), Indian aerospace cryogenic engineer and aerospace official
- V. Narayanan (politician), Indian (Tamil Nandu) politician elected to office in 2019
- V. G. Narayanan, American economist, Harvard faculty 1994–present

== See also ==
- V. Narayana Rao
- V. Narayanasamy
