= Rakesh Krishnan =

Indian cricketer (born 1983)

Rakesh Krishnan (born 23 July 1983) is an Indian cricketer. He is a left-handed batsman and right-arm off-break bowler who has played for Bengal. He was born in Calcutta.

Krishnan made his debut cricketing appearances for the Bengal Under-16s team, batting in and around the opening order. He played five games for the team in the Vijay Merchant Trophy competition of 1998–99, in which Bengal reached the semi-final of the competition, before being eliminated from the competition following a draw against Punjab.

Krishnan made a single first-class appearance for the team, in the Ranji Trophy competition of 2004–05, against Delhi in December 2004. Batting in the upper-middle order, he scored 13 runs in the first innings of the match, and 34 runs in the second.

Krishnan has been playing first-division cricket for the major cricket clubs in Bengal. Currently, he's playing for Mohan Bagan club. Recently he smashed 101(40) not out in the local club one day competition
