= Jörg-Rüdiger Sack =

Computer science professor at Carleton University

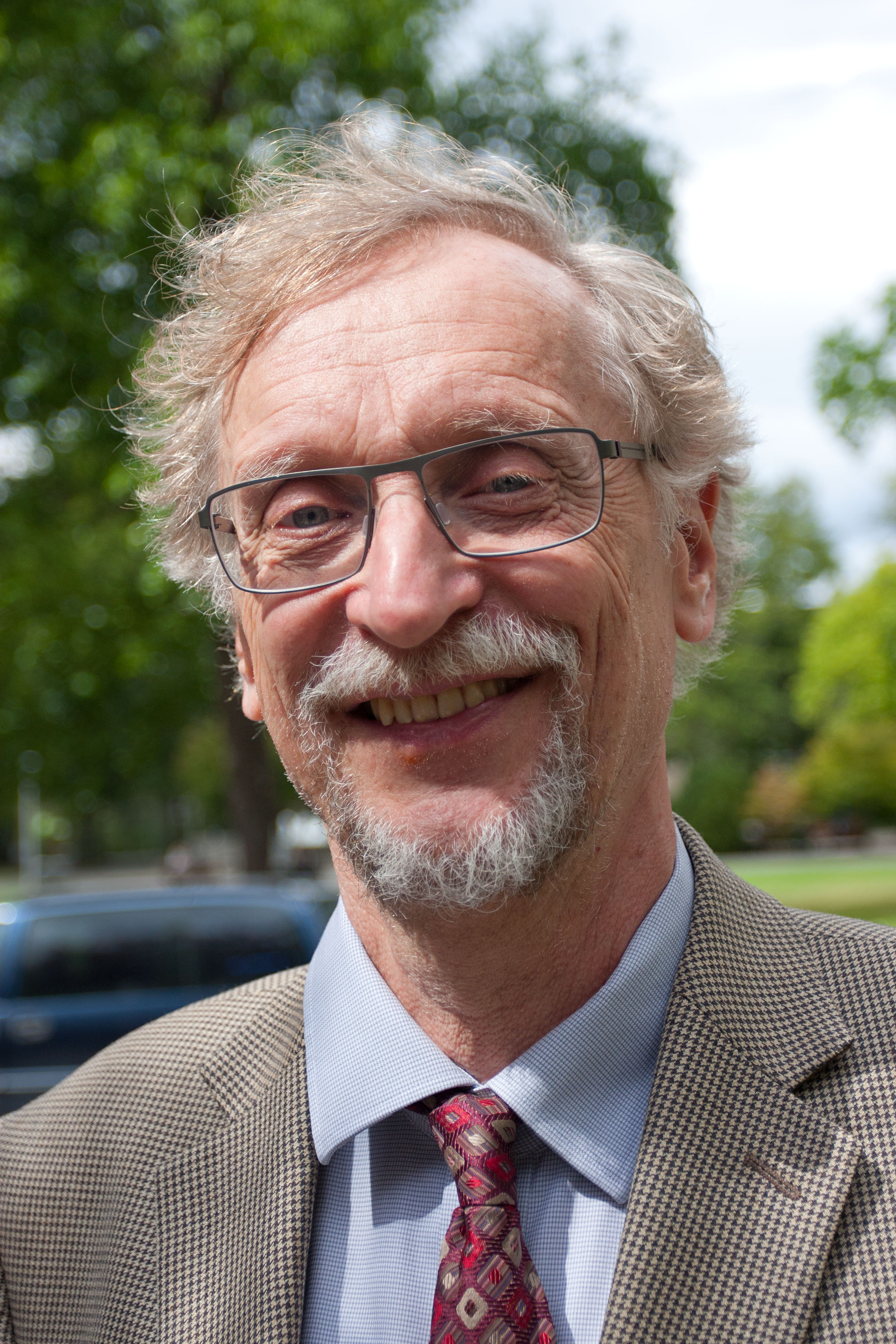
Jörg-Rüdiger Sack at WADS 2015

Jörg-Rüdiger Wolfgang Sack (born in Duisburg, Germany) is a professor of computer science at Carleton University, where he holds the SUN–NSERC chair in Applied Parallel Computing.

Sack received a master's degree from the University of Bonn in 1979 and a Ph.D. in 1984 from McGill University, under the supervision of Godfried Toussaint.

He is co-editor-in-chief of the journal Computational Geometry: Theory and Applications, co-editor of the Handbook of Computational Geometry (Elsevier, 2000, ISBN 978-0-444-82537-7), and co-editor of the proceedings of the biennial Algorithms and Data Structures Symposium (WADS). He was a co-founding editor-in-chief of the open access Journal of Spatial Information Science but is no longer an editor there.

Sack's research interests include computational geometry, parallel algorithms, and geographic information systems.
