= Prasanjit Das =

Indian cricketer (born 1987)

Personal information
- Born: 11 July 1987 (age 39); Sodepur, West Bengal, India
- Batting: Right-handed
- Bowling: Leg break
- Role: Batsman

Domestic team information
- Years: Team
- 2016: Bengal

Career statistics
Competition	First-class
Matches	2
Runs scored	82
Batting average	27.33
100s/50s	0/1
Top score	72
Balls bowled	12
Wickets	1
Bowling average	18
5 wickets in innings	0
10 wickets in match	0
Best bowling	1/18
Catches/stumpings	0/–
- Source: ESPNcricinfo, 16 June 2017

Prasanjit Das (born 11 July 1987) is an Indian former cricketer who played for the Bengal cricket team. He played as a right-handed batsman and occasional leg break bowler.
