= Arthur Langerman =

Belgian jeweller and collector

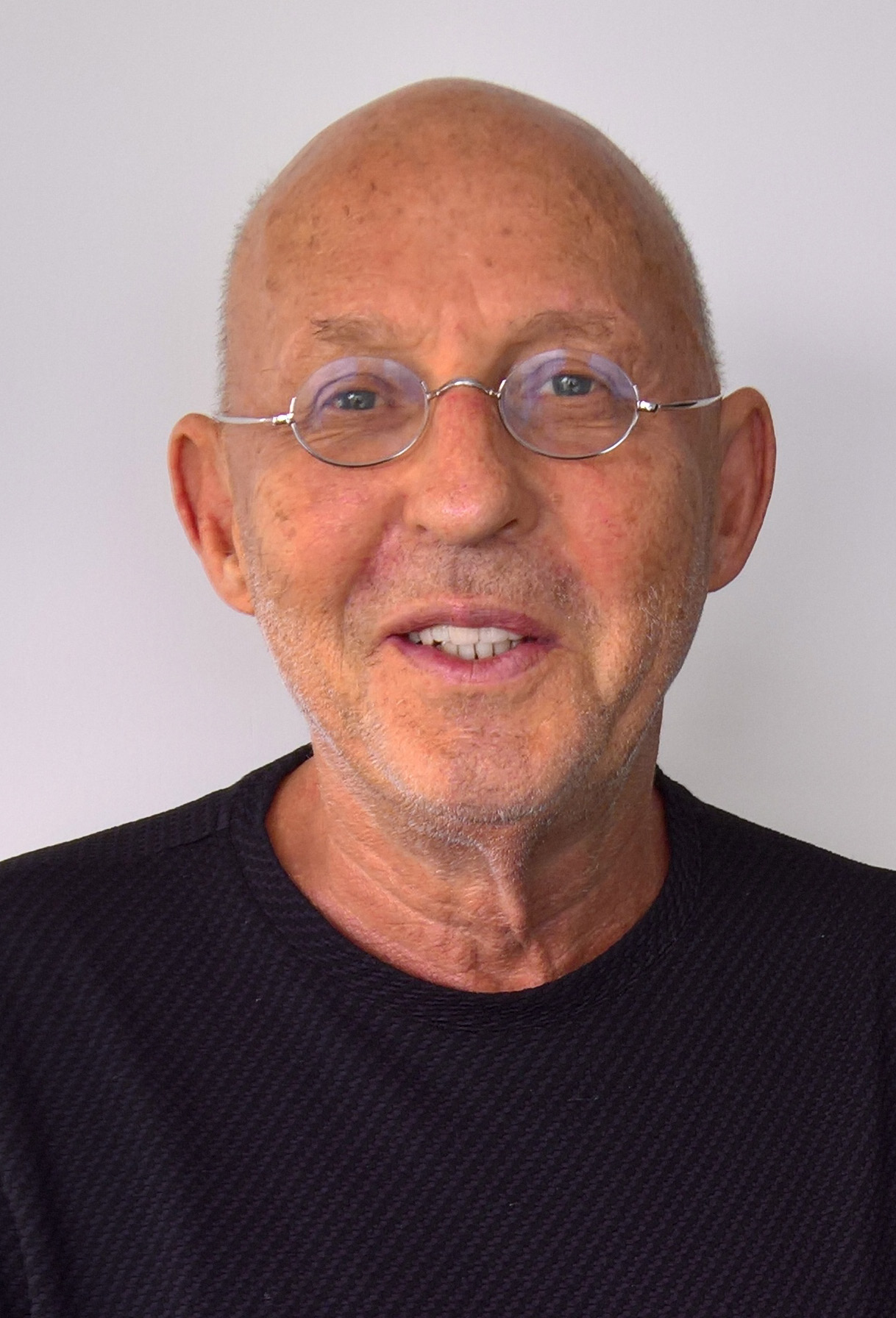
- Born: 21 August 1942 (age 83); Borgerhout, Belgium
- Occupations: diamantaire, translator, collector
- Awards: Mensch of the year 2020

Arthur Eugène Langerman false Swarzberg, known as Arthur Langerman (born 21 August 1942), is a Belgian diamantaire. He is known for having gathered of one of the largest private collections of antisemitic images in the world. The collection constitutes the Arthur Langerman Archive for the Study of Visual Antisemitism (ALAVA) at Technische Universität Berlin in Germany.

== Biography ==
Langerman was born on 21 August 1942 in Borgerhout, Belgium. His father Salomon Langerman false Swarzberg was a furrier born in Kraków in 1907. His Mother Zysla Brandla Blajwas was a milliner born in Warsaw. Both of them settled in Belgium in 1926, and married each other in 1941. They were arrested on 28 March 1944, and detained at the Mechelen transit camp, then deported to Auschwitz-Birkenau by Transport XXV on 19 May 1944.

Arthur was saved from deportation by being placed at the nursery of the AJB (Association des Juifs en Belgique) in Uccle, and then transferred to the nursery of the Baron de Castro street in Etterbeek. The AJB network of institutions for children was controlled by the Gestapo. The children were saved from a roundup organized a few days before the Liberation of Belgium. The Nazis sent Zysla to the Auschwitz concentration camp, where she was made to work at the kitchens, which helped her survive. She returned in 1945. Her husband would never come back and had probably died in the spring of the same year in the subcamp of Flossenbürg at Plattling. The Nazis had murdered at least 18 close relatives of Arthur Langerman.

Upon returning from the camps, Arthur's mother was incapable of caring for her young son. He stayed for a few months with a couple in Charleroi, which had also cared for one of his cousins, and which has since been recognized as Righteous Among the Nations. From 1946, Arthur Langerman lived again with his mother. For the rest of her life, she almost never mentioned memories of the Shoah, which was nevertheless always present in the Langerman house: "Grief for the loss of murdered family members was omnipresent".

=== Diamantaire ===
After his high school studies were interrupted to support his family, Arthur began training as a diamond cleaver in Antwerp. He then worked for eight years as an employee of a manufacturer who taught him all the facets of the trade, before setting up his own business. In the 1980s he specialized in cutting natural color diamonds.

His business expanded considerably after he sold half of his stock to a jeweller in London; he then became an international reference in the field of colored diamonds. He was regularly interviewed by the international press as an expert in the field and is one of the main protagonists in the documentary film Les Diamants de Couleur de Bornéo by Patrick Voillot (2009). His entire career was based in Antwerp.

=== Antisemitic documents ===
In 1961, the Eichmann trial in Jerusalem is heavily covered by the media. Arthur Langerman as a young adult understands the horror and the scale of the Shoah and ponders the causes of antisemitic hatred. Starting from then, he gathered one of the most important private collections of Antisemitica, composed of paintings and ancient engravings (XVI^{th} -XX^{th} centuries), statuettes (wood, ceramics, bronze), posters, original drawings, postcards and more.

Today, his collection is composed of over 8000 international antisemitic images. It contains, among others, "hundreds of sketches, drafts and drawings by the Viennese caricaturist and genre painter Emil Hübl", as well as "more than 1,000 sketches and designs based on Der Stürmer caricatures whose origins remain yet unclear".

Some of these documents were shown at the Dossin Barracks in Mechelen in 2016. The collection was then the object of an important exhibition "Dessins assassins" at the Mémorial de Caen in 2017–2018. In the following years, it gave rise to the travelling exhibitions "Plume de fiel, Images de haine. Esquisse d’une collection insolite" and "#FakeImages: Unmask the Dangers of Stereotypes", which has been shown at the headquarters of the European Commission in Brussels and of the United Nations in New York City.

In 2017, the Center for Research on Antisemitism of Technische Universität Berlin decided to commit important funds to study Arthur Langerman's collection.

Arthur Langerman and his collection are the subject of the documentary film "Le Collectionneur", directed by Pierre Maillard, as well as the documentary film "Collection of Hate – Images of Antisemitism", directed by Andrea Oster. In 2024, the French journalist José-Alain Fralon published Arthur Langerman's biography, titled Les dessins du Diable : de la Shoah à la quête des dessins antisémites, les mille vies d‘Arthur Langerman, roi du diamant de couleur. It has since been translated into German and published in 2025 bearing the title Teuflische Bilder. Arthur Langermans Weg vom Holocaustüberlebenden zum „König der farbigen Diamanten“ und Sammler antisemitischer Zeichnungen.

In March 2019, Arthur Langerman donates his collection to the Center for Research on Antisemitism of Technische Universität Berlin. A foundation is created, the Arthur Langerman Foundation which holds the Arthur Langerman Archive for the Study of Visual Antisemitism (Arthur Langerman Archiv für die Erforschung des visuellen Antisemitismus: ALAVA).

Langerman's collecting efforts were guided by his attempts to understand the history and geography of antisemitism "Most people, among them my parents, did not take measure of what was happening. Jews were being killed since 1933, but they thought nothing would happen to them, and they even had a child during the war. If they had seen all these images I have in front of me, they would have understood. Maybe they would have fled."

In March 2020, Arthur Langerman is awarded the prize "Mensch of the year 2020" by the Belgian magazine Regards, for his relentless work against antisemitism. For him, "The most antisemitic people have never met jewish people". In October 2023, The Algemeiner named Langerman one of the "Top 100 People Positively Influencing Jewish Life." In May 2025, the Technische Universität Berlin appointed him an honorary senator, thus recognizing "his decades-long commitment to combating antisemitism and the generous donation of his globally unique collection of visual antisemitic works" to the university.

=== Translation ===
Since the Shoah, the number of Yiddish speakers had dwindled across the world. To preserve works in this language, Arthur Langerman has translated into French two books of short stories from Sholem Aleichem: La vie éternelle : histoires courtes pour marquer le temps (2012, Métropolis éditions), in collaboration with Ariel Sion, librarian at the Mémorial de la Shoah in Paris; Histoires pour enfants à ne plus mettre dans les mains des enfants in 2019 (MarqueBelge éditeur), illustrations by Sam Ringer.

=== Morpion solitaire ===
As a player of the classic pen and paper game Morpion solitaire or Join Five, Arthur Langerman holds the highest score obtained by a human in the 5D version. He is also co-author of a scientific article about that game.
