= Lata Narayanan =

Indian-Canadian computer scientist

Lata Narayanan (born 1966) is an Indian-Canadian computer scientist whose research concerns distributed algorithms and wireless ad hoc networks. She is a professor and chair of the Department of Computer Science and Software Engineering at Concordia University in Montreal.

== Early life and education ==
Narayanan is originally from Chennai, where she was born in 1966. She went to high school in New Delhi, and is a 1987 graduate of the Birla Institute of Technology and Science, Pilani, majoring in computer science.

Next, she traveled to the University of Rochester in the US for graduate study in computer science, earning a master's degree in 1989 and completing her Ph.D. in 1992. Her dissertation, Selection, Sorting, and Routing on Mesh-Connected Processor Arrays, was supervised by Danny Krizanc.

== Career ==
After postdoctoral research at the University of Manitoba, Narayanan joined the Concordia University faculty in 1993.

Before taking her current role as department chair, she was associate dean for academic programs in the Concordia University Faculty of Engineering and Computer Science, stepping down in 2012.
