= Sayan Mondal =

Indian cricketer (born 1989)

Personal information
- Full name: Sayan Sekhar Mondal
- Born: 10 November 1989 (age 37); Bardhaman, West Bengal, India
- Batting: Left-handed
- Bowling: Right arm medium

Domestic team information
- Years: Team
- 2009–present: Bengal

Career statistics
Competition	FC	LA	T20
Matches	22	25	23
Runs scored	970	374	259
Batting average	27.71	23.37	19.92
100s/50s	1/6	0/2	0/2
Top score	135	88	52
Balls bowled	1414	585	470
Wickets	17	18	29
Bowling average	44.05	27.83	18.20
5 wickets in innings	0	0	0
10 wickets in match	0	0	0
Best bowling	4/71	4/59	4/11
Catches/stumpings	12/–	9/–	6/–
- Source: CricketArchive, 13 February 2014

Sayan Mondal (born 10 November 1989) is an Indian cricketer who plays for Bengal cricket team. He plays in three formats of the game, namely List A cricket, First class cricket and Twenty20.
