= John Iacono =

American computer scientist

- Born: Livingston, New Jersey, US
- Education: Stevens Institute of Technology; Rutgers University
- Awards: Sloan Fellowship
- Scientific career
- Workplaces: Université libre de Bruxelles
- Doctoral advisor: Michael Fredman
- Website: http://johniacono.com

John Iacono is an American computer scientist specializing in data structures, algorithms and computational geometry. He is one of the inventors of the tango tree, the first known competitive binary search tree data structure.

Iacono obtained his M.S. at Stevens Institute of Technology and his Ph.D. in 2001 at Rutgers, the State University of New Jersey under the supervision of Michael Fredman. He is a Sloan Research Fellow and Fulbright Scholar. Formerly a professor of computer science in the New York University Tandon School of Engineering, he now works as a professor at the Université libre de Bruxelles.
