= 2025 Mohun Bagan AC hockey season =

2025 hockey season of Mohun Bagan

Mohun Bagan AC
2025 season
- Head coach: Simranjeet Singh
- Stadium: Howrah Dumurjola Stadium; Mohun Bagan Ground
- Calcutta Hockey League: Champions
- Top goalscorer: Abharan Sudev (9)
- Biggest win: 9–1 vs CESC

The 2025 Mohun Bagan AC hockey season is the club's 28th season in Calcutta Hockey League. The team plays its home matches mostly at the Howrah Dumurjola Stadium and also in Mohun Bagan Ground. They won their 27th Calcutta Hockey League title this season by defeating East Bengal Club 3-1 in the Finals. The club participates in the Calcutta Hockey League.

== Team management ==
Position	Name
Head coach	(India) Simranjeet Singh
Assistant coach	(India) Amit Sharma
Team Manager	(India) Gurmeet Singh

== Squad ==
=== First-team squad ===
As of 9 March 2025

Source: Note: Flags indicate national team as defined under FIFA eligibility rules; some limited exceptions apply. Players may hold more than one non-FIFA nationality.

No.	Pos.	Nation	Player
3		IND	Deekshith A H
5	DF	IND	Sundaram Singh Rajawat
7	FW	IND	Abharan Sudev (1st captain)
8	MF	IND	Arjun Sharma
9	MF	IND	Mohammed Raheel Mouseen
10	DF	IND	Rajbeer Singh
11		IND	Bharath MK
12		IND	Ajay Kumar Ekka
13		IND	Sourabh Pashine
14	DF	IND	Parampreet Singh
15		IND	Deepak
16	GK	IND	Mayank Sharma
17	MF	IND	Nitish Neupane
19	FW	IND	Sudeep Chirmako
21	MF	IND	Harjeet Singh (2nd captain)
21	GK	IND	Jaskaran Singh
24	FW	IND	Karthi Selvam
25		IND	Reetik Roshan Lakra
27	GK	IND	Mohit HS
48	DF	IND	Dipsan Tirkey
63		IND	Sathwik MK
75	DF	IND	Pratap Lakra
77		IND	Ganesh Majji
99		IND	Prasad Kujur

Source = mbft.in

== League standings ==
=== Calcutta Premier Hockey League ===
Pos	Team	Pld	W	D	L	GF	GA	GD	Pts	Qualification
1	Mohun Bagan AC	7	6	1	0	37	9	+28	19	Advance to Finals
2	East Bengal Club	7	5	1	1	26	7	+19	16	Advance to Finals
3	Calcutta Customs Club	6	4	0	2	23	19	+4	12	
4	FCI (E.Z)	6	2	2	2	10	16	−6	8	
5	Mohammedan SC	6	1	2	3	12	25	−13	5	
6	BNR Recreation Club	6	1	1	4	18	26	−8	4	
7	CESC SC	6	1	1	4	9	22	−13	4	
8	Naval Tata Hockey Academy	6	0	2	4	9	20	−11	2	

Source: mbft.in

== Matches ==
=== Calcutta Hockey League ===
27 February 2025 Match 1	Mohun Bagan AC	7–0	FCI (E.Z)	Howrah, West Bengal
15:30 IST	Abharan Sudev; Karthi S Bharath; Ganesh			Stadium: Howrah Dumurjola Stadium

2 March 2025 Match 2	Mohun Bagan AC	9–1	CESC	Howrah, West Bengal
15:30 IST	Abharan Sudev; Bharath; Ganesh; Nitish Neupane; Raheel; Ajay Ekka; Chirmako		no information	Stadium: Howrah Dumurjola Stadium

6 March 2025 Match 3	Mohun Bagan AC	6–2	Naval Tata Hockey Academy	Howrah, West Bengal
15:30 IST	Karthi S Pratap Lakra; Nitish Neupane		no information	Stadium: Howrah Dumurjola Stadium

9 March 2025 Match 4	Mohun Bagan AC	2–2	East Bengal Club	Howrah, West Bengal
15:30 IST	Arjun Singh; Nitish Neupane		no information	Stadium: Howrah Dumurjola Stadium

13 March 2025 Match 5	Mohun Bagan AC	5–2	Calcutta Customs Club	Howrah, West Bengal
15:30 IST	Abharan Sudev; Nitish Neupane; Raheel; Deepak		no information	Stadium: Howrah Dumurjola Stadium

17 March 2025 Match 6	Mohun Bagan AC	4–0	Mohammedan SC	Howrah, West Bengal
15:30 IST	Abharan Sudev; Nitish Neupane; Deepak		no information	Stadium: Howrah Dumurjola Stadium

19 March 2025 Match 7	Mohun Bagan AC	4–2	BNR Recreation Club	Howrah, West Bengal
15:30 IST	Ganesh Majji; Pratap Lakra; Dipsan		no information	Stadium: Howrah Dumurjola Stadium

==== Final ====
23 March 2025 Final	Mohun Bagan AC	3–1	East Bengal Club	Howrah, West Bengal
15:30 IST	Karthi S Raheel; Dipsan		no information	Stadium: Howrah Dumurjola Stadium

== Player statistics ==
=== Goal scorers ===
Pos	No.	Name	Nat	Calcutta Hockey League
1	7	Abharan Sudev	(India)	9
2	24	Karthi Selvam	(India)	6
3	17	Nitish Neupane	(India)	5
4	77	Ganesh Majji	(India)	4
5	11	Bharath MK	(India)	3
5	75	Pratap Lakra	(India)	3
5	9	MD Raheel	(India)	3
8	15	Deepak	(India)	2
9	12	Ajay Ekka	(India)	1
9	19	Sudeep Chirmako	(India)	1
9	8	Arjun Sharma	(India)	1
9	48	Dipsan	(India)	1

== Derbies ==
=== Calcutta Hockey League ===
9 March 2025 Match 4	Mohun Bagan AC	2–2	East Bengal Club	Howrah, West Bengal
15:30 IST	Arjun Singh; Nitish Neupane		no information	Stadium: Howrah Dumurjola Stadium

23 March 2025 Final	Mohun Bagan AC	3–1	East Bengal Club	Howrah, West Bengal
15:30 IST	Karthi S Raheel; Dipsan		no information	Stadium: Howrah Dumurjola Stadium
