= FCC Computer Inquiries =

Trio of inquiries as to telephony services

In the United States, the FCC Computer inquiries were a trio of interrelated rulemaking processes and resulting regulations by the Federal Communications Commission (FCC) focused on the convergence of regulated telephony with unregulated computing services. The Computer inquiries created rules and requirements designed to prevent cross-subsidization, discrimination, and anti-competitive behavior from the Bell Operating Companies (BOCs) entering the enhanced services market.

== Background ==
In 1966, the FCC was interested in the difference between computers that facilitate communications and computers with which people communicate. The FCC had to make a decision on whether both of these types of computers should be regulated as a basic phone service. "The task before the FCC was the nature and extent of the regulatory jurisdiction to be applied to data processing services; and whether, under what circumstances, and subject to what conditions or safeguards, common carriers should be permitted to engage in data processing." The FCC launched the inquiries to resolve these questions.

== Computer I ==
In the 1960s, the FCC faced a problem with existing regulated communication networks such as AT&T who offered basic communication service. Companies found a way to achieve data processing by adding computers to the ends of these existing networks and layering protocols on top of the network. These enhancements, if left unregulated, threatened the growth of these services. In 1970, the FCC made its first attempt at dividing the computer world into two categories: computers that ran communication networks and computers at the end of telephone lines that people interacted. "The division was technological, focused on computer processing, attempting to divide the difference between circuit or message switching and data processing." This division by the Commission was either called pure communications or pure data processing.

If a message is sent from one location to another and it does not change, the FCC defined it as pure communications. On the other hand, if changes or processing happen at the end of the phone line, the FCC defined it as pure data processing. In pure data processing, the computer processes the information and determines if it is a circuit or message-switching. Also, the computer processes the information by using storing, retrieving, sorting, merging or calculating data functions based on how the computer is programmed. Some computer processing, however, uses both pure communication and pure data processing. The FCC was not too sure how to handle these situations and created a third category known as hybrid processing. Hybrid cases were considered a gray area, and the FCC planned to resolve these gray services on a case-by-case basis. The FCC determined if there is more communications, then it was communications; if it was more data processing, then it was data processing. Hybrid cases became the undoing of the Computer I regulations, as they did not clearly define pure and data communications.

=== Regulations ===
The differing treatment of pure communications and pure data processing led to different policy results. Existing market structure influenced the policy. As the pure data processing market had lower barriers to entry and monopolization risk, the FCC ruled that no additional regulation or safeguards were required. The pure communications market, on the other hand, was managed by an incumbent monopoly. The FCC had four concerns about the incumbent telephone companies: "the sale of data processing services by carriers should not hurt the provision of common carrier services, the costs of such data processing services should not be passed on to telephone rate payers, revenues derived from common carrier services should not be used to cross subsidize data processing services, and the furnishing of such data processing services by carriers should not hurt the competitive computer market."

Concerned about shared communication facilities, the FCC developed the "maximum separation" safeguards. If a carrier wanted to enter the unregulated data processing market, they could only do so through a fully separate subsidiary. The separate subsidiary needed to have a separate data processing corporation, accounting books, offices, personnel, equipment, and facilities. The carrier also could not use the subsidiary to promote their data processing services, use network computers for non-network purposes, or use network computers during peak hours to provision data processing services.

== Computer II ==
In 1976, prompted by the number of hybrid cases that used both pure communications and pure data processing, the FCC launched a second inquiry. After Computer I took effect, new technological developments in the telecommunications and computer industries exposed flaws in its definitional structure approach to evaluating the "hybrid category". Dumb terminals had become smart, the cost of CPUs dropped, logical networks overlaid physical networks, and microcomputers made their appearance. The Commission's situation was "more complicated" and eventually led to the birth of the basic versus enhanced services dichotomy. This established a division between "common carrier transmission services from those computer services which depend on common carrier services in the transmission of information."

=== Basic–enhanced services dichotomy ===
If a carrier offers a pure transmission over a path that is transparent in terms of its interaction with customer supplied information, the FCC considered it to offer a "basic" service. Basic service includes processing the movement of information and computer processing, which includes protocol conversion, security, and memory storage. The category includes everything from "voice telephone calls" to a phone company's lease of private lines.

If a carrier offers a service over common carrier transmission facilities that employs computer processing applications that act on the format, content, code, protocol or similar aspects of the subscriber's transmitted information; provides the subscriber additional, different, or restructured information; or involves subscriber interaction with stored information, the FCC considers it an enhanced service. The Commission found that e-mail, voice mail, the World Wide Web, newsgroups, fax store-and-forward, interactive voice response, gateway, audiotext information services, and protocol processing are enhanced services.

The FCC did not want to fall into the same trap as the first inquiry with having a hybrid category and ensure every service is either basic or enhanced. "The Commission made the classification dependent upon the nature of the activity involved." The nature of the activity involved would determine if it fell into the communications or data processing service. This changed the process from an examination of the technology to an examination of the service provisioned.

To eliminate the hybrid cases in the basic–enhanced dichotomy, the FCC designed a "bright-line test". The FCC bright-line test defined enhanced services as anything with more than the transmission capacity of a basic service. A three prong test was also established to test enhanced services. The three prong test "employs computer processing applications that: act on the format, content, code, protocol or similar aspects of a subscriber's transmitted information; provide the subscriber additional, different, or restructured information; or involve subscriber interaction with stored information."

=== Adjunct services ===
If a regulated service uses a traditional telephone service and it does not change the fundamental character of the telephone service, the FCC categorized it as an adjunct service. An example of this would be directory assistance. Providing a phone number is characterized as a basic service, which, regardless of the telephone technology, does not transform it into an enhanced service.

== Computer III ==
In 1985, the FCC launched another rulemaking process in a third Computer inquiry prior to the deployment of the Internet to the consumer. Computer II established the basic and enhanced service dichotomy and Computer III changed how these services were implemented while keeping policy objectives the same. Computer III ensures the separate subsidiary requirements of Computer II do not have additional costs to the public, e.g., decreased service and innovation by Bell Operating Companies using existing regulated operations to benefit unregulated enhanced services. The FCC found that the cost of structural separation outweighed its benefits. The FCC created two non-structural safeguards: the Comparatively Efficient Interconnection (CEI) and the Open Network Architecture (ONA). BOCs were not required to form separate subsidiaries if they moved from a structural safeguard to non-structural safeguard.

=== Comparatively Efficient Interconnection ===
The Comparatively Efficient Interconnection was a temporary solution to allow BOCs to enter the enhanced service market on a non-structural basis. It allowed an enhanced service provider (ESP) to integrate with the BOC, removing the need for a separate subsidiary. The FCC permitted the company to post their CEI plans on the company website. The CEI plan must include "information on interface functionality, unbundling of basic services, resale, technical characteristics, installation, maintenance and repair, end-user access, CEI availability, minimization of transport costs, and recipients of CEI." The CEI plans were used to make sure that if a BOC provided favorable terms to an affiliated ESP, they would provide the same terms to unaffiliated ESPs. This was intended to provide ESPs equal access to the basic services that the BOCs use to provide their own enhanced service.

=== Open Network Architecture ===
The second safeguard that the FCC introduced, which became known as the Open Network Architecture, required BOCs to break their networks into "basic building blocks" and make those available to ESPs for building new enhanced services. The BOCs' basic service offerings were broken apart to help the ESP market. The offerings were divided into Basic Service Elements, Basic Serving Arrangements, Complimentary Network Services, and Ancillary Network Services. Even if a BOC did not want to enter the ESP market, they were required to file ONA plans with the FCC. Only after filing would BCCs be permitted to provide integrated ESP services without a CEI plan.

=== Safeguards ===
The Computer III inquiry provided other safeguards: annual ONA reporting, network information disclosure, cross-subsidization prohibitions, accounting safeguards, and customer proprietary network information.

==== Annual ONA reporting ====
In 1989, the FCC created a reporting structure requiring the BOCs to file quarterly, semi-annual, and annual reports for their ONA. As of February 2011, to better serve the public interest, the FCC temporarily waived reporting requirements to eliminate added expenses to the BOCs.

==== Network information disclosure ====
Regulations require public notice by the carrier if changes are made to the network that would cause it to be unavailable with another service provider or affect a provider's performance. If network changes are made the carrier must provide references to technical specifications, protocols, and standards regarding the transmission, signal, routing, and facility assignment as well any new technology or equipment that may affect the connection to the consumer. This requirement is called network information disclosure and is codified at 47 CFR 51.325–51.335.

==== Cross-subsidization prohibitions ====
The FCC prohibited cross-subsidization: a carrier may not use services not subject to competition to subsidize a service that is subject to competition. For example, a carrier may not fund Internet services using noncompetitive local telephone revenue.

==== Accounting safeguards ====
The FCC created a series of accounting safeguards that can be found in Subpart I of Part 64 of CFR Title 47. Annual independent audits are performed to ensure certain carriers are not improperly cross subsidizing their services. The final reports of these independent audits are publicly available and can be obtained by contacting the Accounting Safeguards Division of the FCC's Common Carrier Bureau. The FCC provides information about common carrier accounts in the ARMIS database available on their website.

==== Customer proprietary network information ====
The FCC needed to create restrictions on BOCs gathering sensitive information from their subscribers. This safeguard to protect subscriber's information has become known as customer proprietary network information (CPNI). The FCC requires carriers to provide any customer proprietary network information available to the public on the same terms and conditions of the affiliated ESP if requested.

In 1996, Congress passed a privacy of customer information provision in section 222 of the Telecommunications Act. Under the statute, CPNI is defined as "information that relates to the quantity, technical configuration, type, destination, location, and amount of use of a telecommunications service subscribed to by any customer of a telecommunications carrier, and that is made available to the carrier by the customer solely by virtue of the carrier-customer relationship; and information contained in the bills pertaining to telephone exchange service or telephone toll service received by a customer of a carrier, except that such term does not include subscriber list information."

== See also ==
- Net neutrality
