= FCI =

FCI may refer to:

== Companies and organizations ==
- Falling Creek Ironworks, the first iron production facility in North America
- Family Carers Ireland, Irish lobbying group
- Fédération cynologique internationale, the Fédération cynologique internationale (International Canine Federation)
- Federal Correctional Institution, part of the United States Bureau of Prisons
- Fédération Cynologique Internationale, the World Canine Federation
- Fertilizer Corporation of India, an Indian government-owned corporation
- Fluid Components International, an American manufacturing company
- Food Corporation of India, an Indian government-owned corporation
- Francis Crick Institute, a British biomedical research centre
- Fujisankei Communications International, an American media company

== Sports ==
- F.C. Indiana, an American soccer team
- FC Ingolstadt 04, a German football club
- FCI Tallinn, an Estonian football club
- Food Corporation of India F.C., an Indian football club
- Italian Cycling Federation (Italian: Federazione Ciclistica Italiana)

== Standards and measures ==
- Facility condition index, in building management
- fCi, the symbol for the femtocurie, a unit of radioactivity
- Foraminiferal Colouration Index, in geology
- Force Concept Inventory, in physics education
- Full configuration interaction, in chemistry
- Functional Capacity Index, in medicine

== Other ==
- Farm Cove Intermediate, an intermediate school in Pakuranga, Auckland
- FCC Computer Inquiries, a trio of interrelated FCC Inquiries
- French Culinary Institute, now the International Culinary Center, in New York City
- Chesterfield County Airport, in Virginia, United States
- Interoceanic Railway of Mexico (Spanish: Ferrocarril Interoceánico de México), a defunct Mexican railroad company
