= Narender Thapa =

Indian footballer (1964–2022)

Personal information
- Date of birth: 22 September 1964
- Place of birth: Punjab, India
- Date of death: 5 August 2022 (aged 57)
- Place of death: Kolkata, West Bengal, India
- Position: Forward

Senior career*
Years	Team	Apps	(Gls)
- Mohun Bagan AC
- Mohammedan Sporting
- West Bengal
- Food Corporation of India

International career
1983–?	India	29	
- * Club domestic league appearances and goals

Narender Thapa (Note: Thapa has also been referenced as Narendra Thapa.) (22 September 1964 – 5 August 2022) was an Indian footballer who played as a forward. He represented the India national team at the 1984 Asian Cup, where the team finished bottom in the group stage. He also played for West Bengal, winning the Santosh Trophy in 1986. Through his career he represented both of Calcutta's football clubs, Mohun Bagan and Mohammedan Sporting.

== Career in football ==
Thapa was born on 22 September 1964. He was from the Indian state of Punjab and moved to Calcutta in the 1980s. He played as a forward and was noted for his craftiness in gameplay. At the club level, he played for both of Calcutta's football clubs Mohun Bagan and Mohammedan Sporting at different times in his career. Between Mohun Bagan and Mohammedan Sporting, he was also a part of teams that won the IFA Shield, Rovers Cup, and Federation Cup.

Thapa made his debut with the India national team in 1983 playing against China in the Nehru Cup in Cochin in the southern Indian state of Kerala. He was considered one of coach Milovan Ćirić's favorites. Through his career he played 29 matches and scored three goals. His best performance came in the 1984 Great Wall Cup in Beijing where he scored the winning goal against Algeria allowing the Indian team to win 1–0. He represented the India national team at the 1984 Asian Cup, where the team finished bottom in the group stage. He also played for West Bengal, winning the Santosh Trophy in 1986.

== Personal life ==
In addition to being a footballer, Thapa was employed with the Food Corporation of India (FCI), an Indian public sector enterprise. He also represented FCI in the B-division leagues.

Thapa died on 5 August 2022 from a cardiac arrest. He was 57 years old. He had suffered a paralytic attack a few years earlier that had left his right side paralysed. An obituary in the Indian sports magazine Sportstar called him a "brawny forward" and described his gameplay as a "rare combination of skill, speed and stamina".

== Honours ==
West Bengal

- Santosh Trophy: 1986
