= Gurbux Singh (field hockey, born 1935) =

Indian field hockey player (1936–2026)

Personal information
- Nationality: (United Kingdom) British Indian (1935-1947) (India) Indian (1947-Present)
- Born: 11 February 1935 Peshawar, NWFP, British India

Sport
- Sport: Field hockey
- Event: Men's team
Medal record
Men's field hockey
Representing India
Olympic Games
Gold medal – first place	1964 Tokyo	Team
Bronze medal – third place	1968 Mexico City	Team
Asian Games
Gold medal – first place	1966 Bangkok	Team

Gurbux Singh is an Indian field hockey player who was a member of the Indian team that won the gold medal at the 1964 Summer Olympics, the bronze medal at the 1968 Summer Olympics and the gold medal at the 1966 Asian Games. He was the joint captain of the Indian team at the 1968 Summer Olympics. He was also the coach of the Indian team at the 1976 Summer Olympics. For his outstanding contribution to the country in the field of sports, Singh received the Arjuna Award in 1966.

== Sub-caste ==
The sub-caste of Gurbux Singh is Kohli but he prefers not to suffix it with his name.

== Early life ==
Gurbux Singh was born at Peshawar but grew up in Rawalpindi. After the partition of India, the family first moved to Lucknow, then to Mhow and finally to Meerut from where he did his graduation. He moved to Calcutta in 1957, a city which ultimately became his permanent home and shaped his sports career. Singh initially tried his hand at badminton but then started playing hockey for his school in Lucknow.

Singh started hockey at the age of 16. He represented Agra University in 1954–55 and a year later won the Obaidullah Gold Cup Hockey Championship. He first played for East Bengal Club in 1957, and was influential in their first victory at the Beighton Cup that year. He later represented Calcutta Customs Club from 1957 to 1965, followed by Mohun Bagan Athletic Club from 1968 to 1980. He had a distinguished career in domestic hockey.

== International career ==
A skilled full-back player, Singh made his international debut in a tour of Australia and New Zealand in 1960, and also participated in the International Hockey Tournament at Ahmedabad in 1962. He was a member of the India hockey team which participated in International Hockey Tournament at Lyons in 1963. He was a member of the teams that won the gold medals at the 1964 Tokyo Olympics and the 1966 Asian Games at Bangkok. He led India on tours of Germany and Japan in 1966, Sri Lanka in 1967 and the Pre-Olympic tournament in London in 1967. In the 1968 Mexico City Olympics, he shared captaincy with Prithipal Singh, where India won the bronze medal. He is considered to be one of the greatest Indian hockey players of all time.

After retiring from internationals in 1968, Singh took to coaching and umpiring. He coached France in 1974–75 and India during the 1976 Montreal Olympics. A national selector in 1973 and again from 1980 to 1985, he was the manager of the Indian team to the 1973 World Cup and the 1983 Champions Trophy.

Singh was conferred with the Arjuna Award after the Indian team's victory at the 1966 Asian Games. In 2013, he received the Banga Bibhushan, a title instituted by the West Bengal government to honour distinguished achievements in various fields. In 2018, he was awarded Bharat Gaurav by East Bengal Club.

He is known for having served Indian hockey for over 50 years in various capacities, and is credited with doing much to better the state of Indian hockey.

== Autobiography ==
- My Golden Days, Allsport Foundation, Kolkata, 2017, ISBN 978-8193712702

== See also ==
- List of Indian hockey captains in Olympics
- Field hockey in India
