= Keshav Dutt =

Indian field hockey player (1925–2021)

Personal information
- Full name: Keshav Chander Datt
- Born: 29 December 1925 Lahore, British India
- Died: 7 July 2021 (aged 95) Kolkata, India

Sport
- Sport: Field hockey
- Position: Halfback
Senior career
Years	Team	Caps	Goals
1950	Calcutta Port Commissioners	-	-
1951–1960	Mohun Bagan	-	-
National team
Years	Team	Caps	Goals
1947–1956	India	22	(2)
Medal record
Men's field hockey
Representing India
Olympic Games
Gold medal – first place	1948 London	Team
Gold medal – first place	1952 Helsinki	Team

Keshav Chandra Dutt, also spelt as Keshav Datt (29 December 1925 – 7 July 2021), was an Indian field hockey player and played as a halfback. He was a part of the team that won gold medals at the 1948 and 1952 Olympics. He made 22 international appearances for India and scored two goals in his career. Keshav was the last surviving member of the Indian hockey team which participated at the 1948 London Olympic Games. He was regarded as one of the finest Indian hockey centre half-backs.

== Biography ==
He was born on 29 December 1925 in Lahore (which was then part of British India before the partition). He pursued his higher studies at the Government College University, Lahore. He moved to Bombay and later settled in Kolkata in 1950 at a time when his birthplace Lahore (which later became part of Pakistan after it gained independence in 1947) endured post-independence riots in 1948.

Dutt served as president of both the CC&FC and Saturday Club.

== Career ==
He was part of the Indian team captained by Dhyan Chand which toured East Africa to play in a hockey tournament in 1947. Dutt was also mentored by Dhyan Chand during his early playing days.

He made his maiden Olympic appearance representing India at the 1948 Summer Olympics and was part of the Indian squad which thrashed Great Britain 4–0 in the final to clinch gold. He was the vice captain of the Indian team at the 1952 Summer Olympics where India secured gold medal in the final against the Netherlands with a comfortable 6–1 win. He was also in the radar for the 1956 Summer Olympics but could not make it into the team due to his professional commitments with Brooke Bond. It was revealed that his employer Brooke Bond did not grant him permission to participate at the 1956 Melbourne Olympics.

He played for Calcutta Port Commissioners in 1950 and then joined Mohun Bagan AC in 1951 after accepting the invitation from Jahar Ganguly who served as the then secretary of Mohun Bagan Hockey. Dutt also captained the Mohun Bagan side from 1951 to 1953 and was also reappointed as captain for one season from 1957 to 1958. He played a key role during the 1952 Beighton Cup where Mohun Bagan emerged as winners for the first time in the tournament history. During his ten-year career with Mohun Bagan club, the club won a total of three Beighton Cups and six Calcutta Hockey League titles. He also played badminton, representing Bengal at the national level.

== Honours ==
He received the prestigious Banglar Gourav award in 2013 from the State Government of Bengal. He was conferred with the Mohun Bagan award in 2019 and became the first non footballer to receive the award. In 2020, he received the Dhyan Chand Lifetime Achievement Award for his contributions in the field of hockey.

He also received honorary mention in Dhyan Chand's autobiography Goal where Chand rated Dutt as one of the greatest half-backs during the post-independence years in India.

== Death ==
He died on 7 July 2021 at the age of 95 due to age-related ailments in Santoshpur, Kolkata.
