= Open network architecture =

In telecommunications, and in the context of Federal Communications Commission's (FCC) Computer Inquiry III, Open network architecture (ONA) is the overall design of a communication carrier's basic network facilities and services to permit all users of the basic network to interconnect to specific basic network functions and interfaces on an unbundled, equal-access basis.

The ONA concept consists of three integral components:

1. Basic serving arrangements (BSAs)
2. Basic service elements (BSEs)
3. Complementary network services

== See also ==
- Open Garden
