= Jaswant Singh Rajput =

Indian field hockey player (1926–2015)

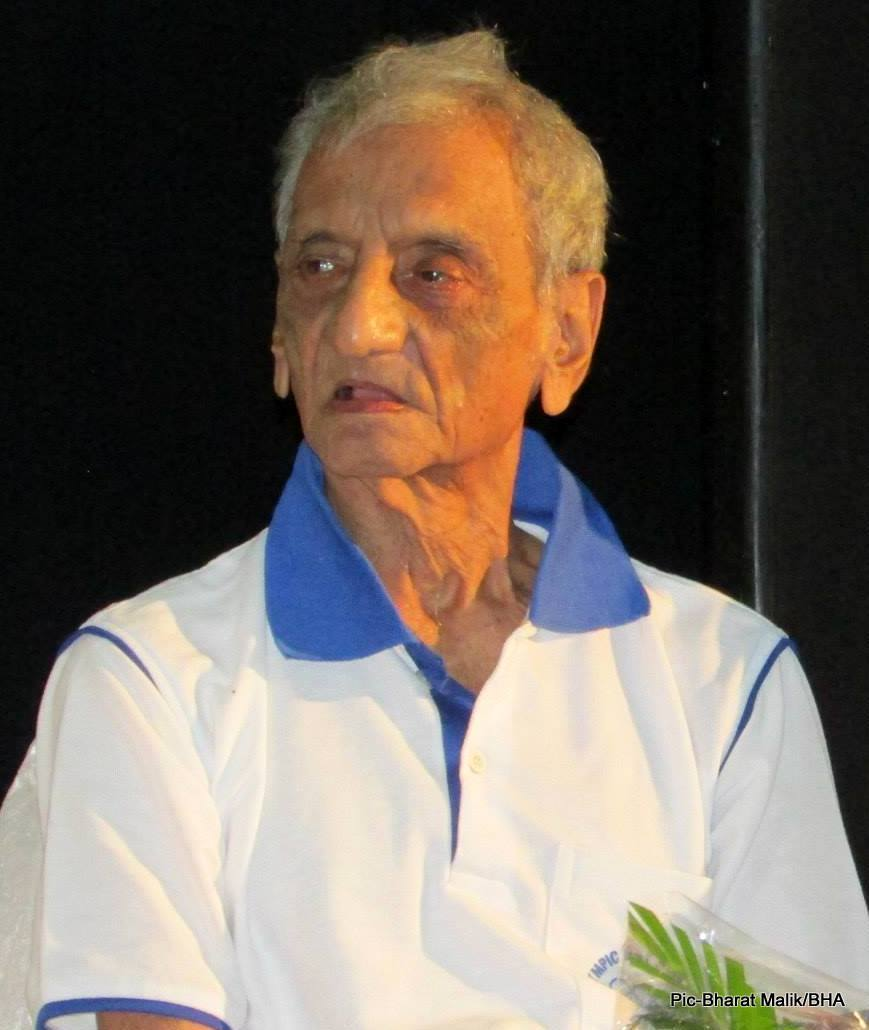

Personal information
- Born: 1926 Delhi, British India
- Died: 28 January 2015 (aged 88–89) Kolkata, India

Sport
- Sport: Field hockey
- Position: Centre-half
Senior career
Years	Team	Caps	Goals
–	Bhawanipore	-	-
1952–?	Mohun Bagan	-	-
National team
Years	Team	Caps	Goals
–	India		-
Medal record
Olympic Games
Representing India
Gold medal – first place	1948 London	Team
Gold medal – first place	1952 Helsinki	Team

Jaswant Singh Rajput (1926 – 28 January 2015) was an Indian field hockey player who played as a center-half in the Indian team. At the club level, he played for Bhowanipore and Mohun Bagan. Known for his dribbling skills and ball control, he won gold medals with the Indian team at the 1948 and 1952 Summer Olympics.

== Career ==
Singh began playing as a left-half during his school days in Delhi, and represented the Delhi University at the time. Spotted by the selectors, he was named in the Indian team for the 1948 Summer Olympics, and went on to win the gold medal. He won the gold medal with the team again at the 1952 Olympics in Helsinki. At the club level, he played for Bhowanipore before moving to Mohun Bagan in 1952. With Bagan, he won the Beighton Cup.
