= Bombay Gold Cup =

Hockey tournament in India

All India Bombay Gold Cup Hockey Tournament
- Sport: Field hockey
- Founded: 1955; 71 years ago
- Administrator: Mumbai Hockey Association
- Country: India
- Headquarters: Mumbai
- Most recent champions: Indian Navy, Mumbai
- Most titles: BSF Jalandhar (8 titles)
- Website: mumbaihockey.org

Bombay Gold Cup is a field hockey tournament organized by the Mumbai Hockey Association (MHA). It was instituted in 1955 by Naval Tata, the then President of the Bombay Hockey Association. The Cup was donated by the then Chief Minister of Maharashtra Morarji Desai in 1955. MHA organises this All India Hockey Tournament as an annual feature and is held every year at Mumbai, Maharashtra.

== Venue ==
The matches are held at Mahindra Hockey Stadium.

== Teams ==
The teams which participates in the tournament consists of public sector teams from across the country, such as Air India, Border Security Force, Central Railway, Bharat Petroleum, Punjab and Sind Bank etc.

== Results ==
The results of the Bombay Gold Cup:

Year	Winner	Runner-up
1955	Lusitanians SC	Bhawnagar (Nagpur)
1956	(Pakistan) Afghan Club	Central Railway
1957	Central Railway	Punjab Hawks
1958	Punjab Hawks	Central Railway
1959	Punjab Police	Central Railway
1960	Lusitanians SC	Burmah Shell
1961	MEG, Bengaluru	Presidents XI
1962	Central Railway	Punjab Police
1963	Punjab Police	Chennai
1964	Mohun Bagan	Calcutta Customs
1965	B.N. Railway	MEG, Bengaluru
1966	Northern Railway	ICF (Perambur)
1967	Indian Air Force	Mysore XI
1968	BSF Jalandhar	Indian Air Force
1969	Tata SC and BSF Jalandhar were declared joint winners	
1970	BSF Jalandhar	Mohun Bagan
1971	Services XI	Indian Air Force
1972	Indian Airlines	Services XI
1973	BSF Jalandhar	A.S.C (Meerut)
1974	BSF Jalandhar	Mahindra & Mahindra
1975	Western Railway	Signals (Jalandhar)
1976	Southern Railway (Madras)	Mahindra & Mahindra
1977	ASC (Jalandhar)	Signals (Jalandhar)
1978	EME - Jalandhar	Punjab Police
1979	Punjab Police	EME Jalandhar
1980	BSF Jalandhar	Signals - Jalandhar
1981	BSF Jalandhar	EME Jalandhar
1982	ASC Jalandhar	Mahindra & Mahindra
1983	Indian Airlines	Bihar Regt Centre
1984	CRPF (Neemuch)	ASC Jalandhar
1985	Indian Airlines	(Pakistan) PIA
1986	Indian Airlines	Mahindra & Mahindra
1987	ASC Jalandhar	Indian Airlines
1988	Punjab Police	Punjab & Sind Bank
1989	Corps of Signals	Namdhari XI
1992	BSF Jalandhar	Army XI
1993	RCF Kapurthala	Army XI
1999	Punjab Police	Punjab & Sind Bank
2001	Air India	Indian Airlines
2002	Air India	Indian Airlines
2003	Indian Airlines	Indian Oil
2004	Punjab & Sind Bank	Western Railway
2005	Western Railway	Punjab & Sind Bank
2006	Army XI	Bharat Petroleum
2007	Bharat Petroleum	Air India
2008	Army XI	Bharat Petroleum
2009	Army XI	Air India
2013	Indian Oil Corporation	Air India
2014	Bharat Petroleum	Indian Oil Corporation
2015	Bharat Petroleum	Comptroller and Auditor General
2016	South Central Railway	Punjab National Bank
2017	Indian Oil Corporation	Bharat Petroleum
2019	Indian Oil Corporation	Punjab & Sind Bank
2020	Indian Navy	South Central Railway

== See also ==
- List of field hockey championships in India
