= Bengal Nagpur Railway FC =

Indian institutional football club

Bengal Nagpur Railway
- Full name: Bengal Nagpur Railway Football Club
- Short name: BNR
- Founded: 1929; 97 years ago (as Bengal Nagpur Railway Recreation Club)
- Ground: Various
- Owner: South Eastern Railway
- Chairman: P. Mishra
- League: Calcutta First Division
- Website: bnrclub.com

Bengal Nagpur Railway Football Club (also known as BNR Recreation Club) is an Indian institutional football club based in Kolkata, West Bengal. Founded in 1929, the club competes in the Premier Division B of the Calcutta Football League.

== History ==
The Bengal Nagpur Railway Recreation Club was established in 1929 as the recreational arm of Bengal Nagpur Railway (BNR), now known as South Eastern Railway (one of the companies credited for pioneering the development of railways in eastern and central India). The BNR Club was associated with numerous sports including football, cricket, field hockey and water polo.

BNR reached the first division of Calcutta Football League in 1949 and as an institutional team was a force to reckon in Kolkata football during their golden period in the 1960s. They won prestigious IFA Shield in 1963, and ended up as runners-up in 1966. and Rovers Cup in 1964–65. They also achieved success at the 1967 Durand Cup, by finishing as runners-up. The club later took part in 1985 IFA Shield, where they faced noted Uruguayan club Centro Atlético Fénix. The club was later briefly managed by legendary Indian footballer Tulsidas Balaram. Later in the 1990s, BNR consecutively appeared in Super Division of the CFL, playing home matches at the Rabindra Sarobar Stadium.

== Notable players ==
=== Association football ===
Notable players who have played for the Bengal Nagpur Railway FC include Sheoo Mewalal, Tulsidas Balaram, Arun Ghosh, K. Appalaraju, Rajendra Mohan, Samar Banerjee, Chandreshwar Prasad, Mihir Bose, Sudip Chatterjee. Among them, Appalaraju emerged as top scorer of the CFL in 1959 with BNR. Indian coach Amal Dutta also appeared with BNR; he later managed the team too. Former Pakistani international Tarapada Ray, who later gained Indian citizenship, also appeared with the club.

=== Field hockey ===
- (British Raj) Leslie Claudius – member of Indian hockey team that won the gold medals at the 1948, 1952 and 1956, and silver medal at the 1960 Summer Olympic Games.
- (British Raj) Joseph Galibardy – represented India at the 1936 Summer Olympics in Berlin and won gold medal, played domestic hockey for BNR.

== Honours ==
=== League ===
- CFL Second Division
  - Champions (1): 1949
- CFL First Division
  - Third place (1): 2022

=== Cup ===
- IFA Shield
  - Champions (1): 1963
  - Runners-up (1): 1966
- Durand Cup
  - Runners-up (1): 1967
- Rovers Cup
  - Champions (1): 1964–65
- Sikkim Governor's Gold Cup
  - Runners-up (1): 2009
- EK Nayanar Memorial Gold Cup
  - Champions (1): 2012

== Other departments ==
=== Field hockey ===
Alongside football, field hockey is practiced in BNR. From the British rule in the country until 1960s, it was having Anglo-Indian players, who led the club various nationwide tournaments. Notable players of the team in Colonial era were Carl Tapsell, Dicky Carr and Joe Gallibardy. Affiliated with the Bengal Hockey Association (BHA), the club participated in prestigious Beighton Cup and Calcutta Hockey League.

Honours

- Beighton Cup
  - Champions (5): 1937, 1939, 1943, 1944, 1945
  - Runners-up (8): 1931, 1932, 1935, 1938, 1942, 1946, 1968, 1994
- Calcutta Hockey League
  - Champions (4): 1965, 1966, 1967, 1994
- Bombay Gold Cup
  - Champions (1): 1965
- Obaidullllah Gold Cup
  - Champions (9): 1958, 1960, 1961, 1962, 1964, 1965, 1967, 1969, 1972
- Khandwa Gold Cup
  - Champions (3): 1966, 1969, 1970
- BHA Hockey League
  - Runners-up (2): 2009, 2017
- Lagden Cup
  - Champions (1): 2020

=== Cricket ===
BNR club has its cricket section, which is affiliated to the Cricket Association of Bengal (CAB), and competes in numerous regional tournaments including the First Division League, and J.C. Mukherjee T-20 Trophy.

Honours

- CAB First Division League
  - Champions (1): 2010–11
- CAB Senior Knock-out Championship
  - Champions (1): 1962–63

=== Women's football ===
Women's football is also being practiced in BNR, and the team participates in regional tournaments.

== See also ==
- Football in Kolkata
- List of football clubs in India
