= East Bengal Club =

Indian multi-sports club based in Kolkata

Coordinates: 22°33′34.06″N 88°20′35.65″E

- Full name: East Bengal Club
- Nickname: Lal Holud Brigade; Bangal Brigade; Torch Bearers
- Founded: August 1, 1920; 106 years ago
- Colors: Red; Yellow
- President: Murari Lal Lohia
- Website: eastbengalclub.com

East Bengal Club, commonly referred to as East Bengal (Bengali pronunciation: [ˈi:st ˌbenˈɡɔːl]), is an Indian professional multi-sports club based in Kolkata, West Bengal. It is best known for its professional men's football team that competes in the Indian Super League (ISL), the top flight of the Indian football league system. It is one of the most successful football clubs in the country. The club has other departments for women's football, men's and women's cricket, field hockey, athletics and eSports.

East Bengal was founded on 1 August 1920. It first started with just its men's football department but soon expanded into other sports such as hockey after 1947 and cricket in the 1970s. The women's football team was started in 2001.

East Bengal is one of the most widely supported sports clubs in Asia. The club is mainly supported by the Bangals, i.e., the immigrant population from the eastern region of Bengal, who were forced to leave their homes (modern-day Bangladesh) during the partition of 1947. For those people, East Bengal Club became a source of identity and hope. The huge influx of dispossessed into the state led to a socio-economic crisis. This led to rivalries among the immigrant and native population of West Bengal, popularly named as Bangal (বাঙ্গাল) in every sphere of life, from jobs to schools and even on football, cricket and hockey pitches. As a result, East Bengal has a long-standing rivalry with its cross-town competitors Mohun Bagan, which is mainly supported by the native population, ghotis and biharis, with whom it competes in the Kolkata derby, Asia's biggest sports rivalry. East Bengal also shares a local rivalry with another Kolkata club, Mohammedan. The club dons the iconic red and golden yellow colours, which give it the nickname of "Red and Gold Brigade" and "Lal Holud". The fans of the club are also collectively called the Torchbearers

== History ==
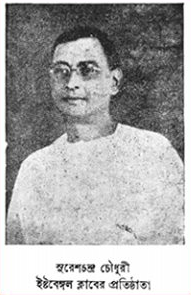
Suresh Chandra Chaudhari (founder)

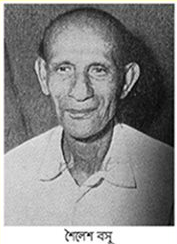
Sailesh Bose

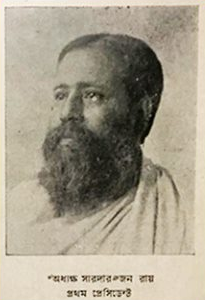
Sarada Ranjan Roy (First president)

On 28 July 1920, Jorabagan Club was scheduled to play against Mohun Bagan in the Coochbehar Cup. Jorabagan Club sent out their starting eleven but with the notable exclusion of defender Sailesh Bose, who was dropped from the squad for undisclosed reasons. The then vice-president of Jorabagan Club, Suresh Chandra Chaudhuri, asked in vain for Bose to be included in the line-up. When his request was not welcomed, Chaudhuri left the club along with Raja Manmatha Nath Chaudhuri, Ramesh Chandra Sen, and Aurobinda Ghosh. They formed East Bengal Club as a Sports and Cultural Association in the neighbourhood of Jorabagan on 1 August 1920. The name East Bengal was chosen for the newly formed club as the founders hailed from the eastern region of Bengal. Sarada Ranjan Ray took on the role of becoming the first president of this newly formed club while Suresh Chandra Chowdhury and Tarit Bhusan Roy were declared to be the first joint secretaries of the club. Soon after, Nagen Kali, M. Talukdar, B. Sen, N. Gossain, Goshto Paul (on loan from Mohun Bagan), P. Bardhan, S. Das, S. Tagore, J. Mukherjee, Ramesh Chandra Sen, S. Bose, C. Bose, A. Roy, and A. Bannerjee were announced to be the members of the first team squad by the board.

== Crest, colours and kits ==
=== Crest ===
In 1930, Mahatma Gandhi's Satyagraha swept over India and affected football. Indian clubs boycotted the ongoing Calcutta Football League midway through the season. Amidst much confusion, Royal Regiment was declared the winner in the first division. However, East Bengal was not allowed to be promoted to the First Division. Thousands of East Bengal fans and officials decided to hold a protest march at the East Bengal Ground. It was at this march that flaming torches were carried by the protesters. And the hand holding flame torch (known as 'Mawshal' or 'মশাল' in Bangla) became the club emblem, which has remained to this day. In the year 2020 East Bengal released a special Centenary Crest to celebrate 100 years of its existence.

First logo

=== Colours ===
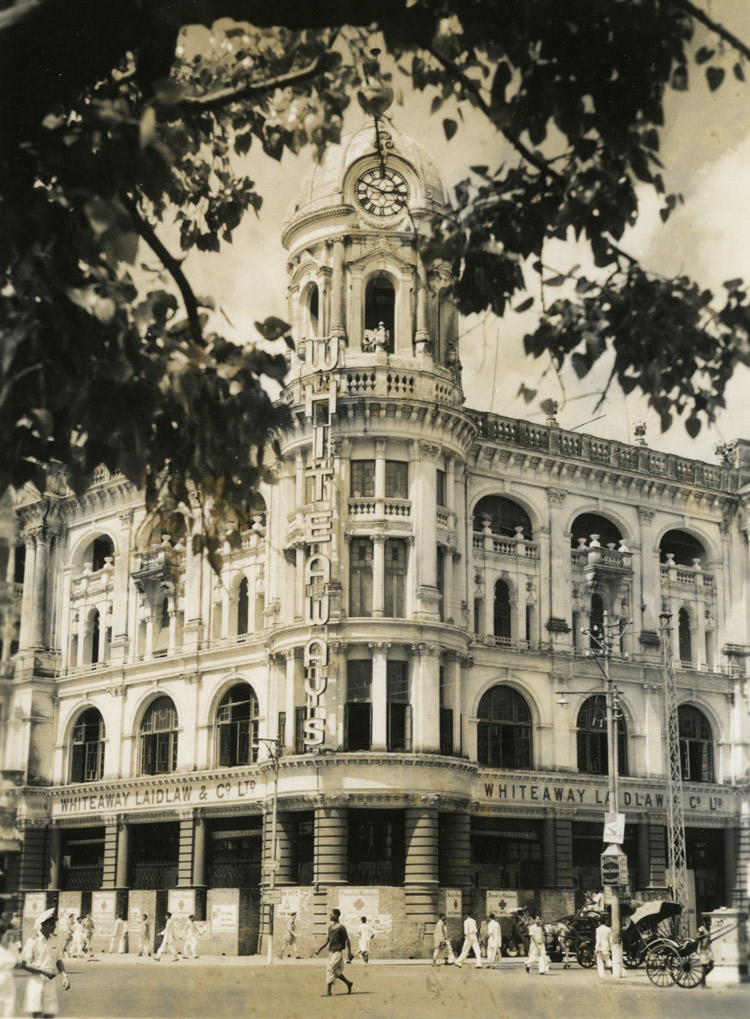
Whiteaway, Laidlaw & Co. department store in 1945

The primary and secondary colors of East Bengal are red and yellow respectively. Traditionally, the home kit consists of a red and yellow jersey with black shorts, while the away kit colors vary every year. These colors came about after the club was formed when the founders debated over them for the club jersey. At that time, the jerseys used to come from England. The founders, while searching, came across the red and gold color shirt hanging at the Whiteaway, Laidlaw & Co. department store in Chowringhee, Kolkata. It attracted them, and they finalized the colors and jersey. It cost ₹80 in 1920, four times higher than the average. These colours permanently integrated with the club.

== Departments ==
=== Men's football ===
The men's football team is the original department with which the club was founded in 1920. East Bengal FC is one of the most successful football clubs in the country having won 39 state leagues and 3 national titles amongst numerous Durand Cups, Federation Cups and other premier Cup competitions. East Bengal is also the only Indian club to have ever won a FIFA recognized international tournament in 2003 which was the ASEAN Club Championship. East Bengal is the joint most successful team in that competition.

=== Women's football ===
The women's football team was formed in 2001. It won the Calcutta Women's Football League title in its inaugural season and was runners-up in 2002. In the centenary year, the women's team was relaunched. In the first year of relaunch, the East Bengal women's team became runner's up of the 2020 Kanyashree Cup.

=== Reserves team and Academy ===
East Bengal Club Reserves is the reserve team of East Bengal Club. It is the most senior level beneath the first team. The team generally consists of younger players but at times senior players also play. Reserve side currently plays in the Calcutta Football League.

East Bengal Academy are the club's under-21, under-18, under-15 and under-13 sections. The under-21 team is the last stage for promotion of youth players into the first team. The youth teams participate in the Reliance Foundation Development League and the Youth League of various age groups.

=== Cricket ===
The East Bengal Club Cricket team participates in various tournaments for varying age groups conducted by the Cricket Association of Bengal. Currently, it participates in the CAB First Division League, CAB Senior Knockout, CAB Super League, and JC Mukherjee Trophy. The team plays its home matches mostly at the Eden Gardens and Jadavpur University Campus Ground. They have won around 60 major state-level trophies so far. Kapil Dev, Sachin Tendulkar, Ajay Jadeja, Navjot Singh Sidhu and Sourav Ganguly have played on the team.

=== Hockey ===
This department started after the Independence of India. The club is affiliated with the Bengal Hockey Association and participated in the BHA First Division hockey league and the Beighton Cup. They won 13 trophies. The team was disbanded in 2000. The hockey department was restarted in 2021 with Calcutta Hockey League.

=== Athletics ===
East Bengal has an athletics team, which is affiliated with the West Bengal Athletic Association, and participates in various tournaments of West Bengal. The club also organizes Annual Athletic meets at the club ground.

=== E-Sports ===
East Bengal also took part in the inaugural season of e-ISL where the ISL teams competed to play the video game FIFA 22. The club was represented by 2 youngsters, Ankit Gupta and Shayantan Mondal.

== Ownership ==
East Bengal is organized as a registered society under the Societies Registration Act, 1860, which means one can avail membership of the club. There are around 12,000 members. Although, a limited company, named East Bengal Club Pvt. Ltd., was later formed, and both are governed by the club parallelly. Sponsorships and investments happen via this corporate company. The club is governed by its own set of rules and regulations. Amendments and resolutions are passed via extraordinary or annual general meeting.

== Stadiums ==
The club has used several stadiums at Kolkata, Howrah and Barasat, including the Eden Gardens, which has been reserved for cricket since Salt Lake Stadium opened in 1984. The first ground used by the club was Kumartuli Park in north Kolkata.

=== Salt Lake Stadium ===
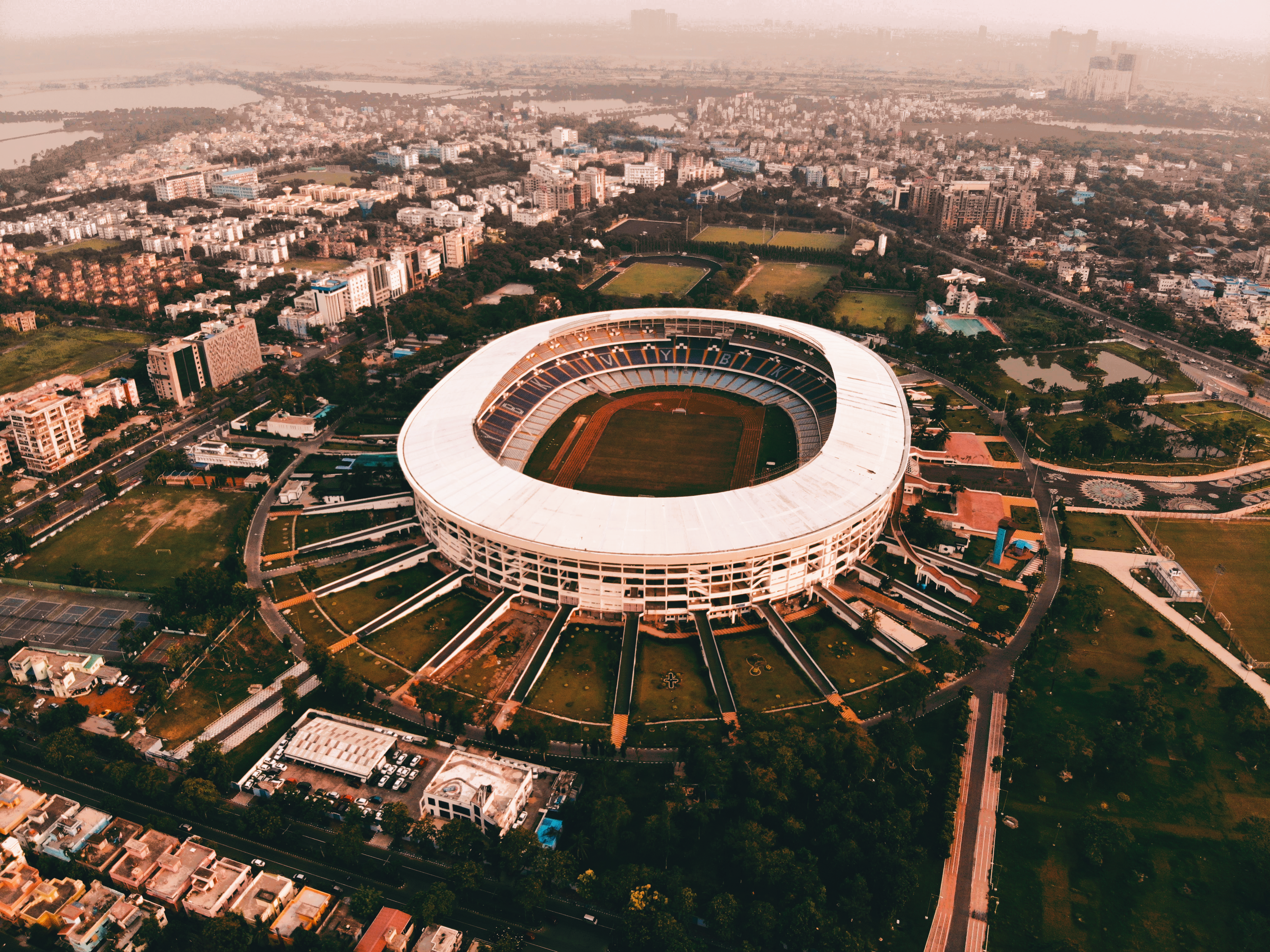
Salt Lake Stadium

The Salt Lake Stadium, also known as Vivekananda Yuba Bharati Krirangan (VYBK), is a multi-purpose stadium in Kolkata, built in 1984. The stadium is the largest non-auto racing in India. It is currently used mainly for football matches. The stadium includes a unique running track, long jump track, electronic scoreboard, natural turf, floodlighting arrangement, conference hall, medical room, and a doping control Room. The Salt Lake Stadium hosts the home games of East Bengal in the Indian Super League and AFC competitions. The total capacity of the stadium was 85,000, before it was changed to 68,000.

=== East Bengal Ground ===
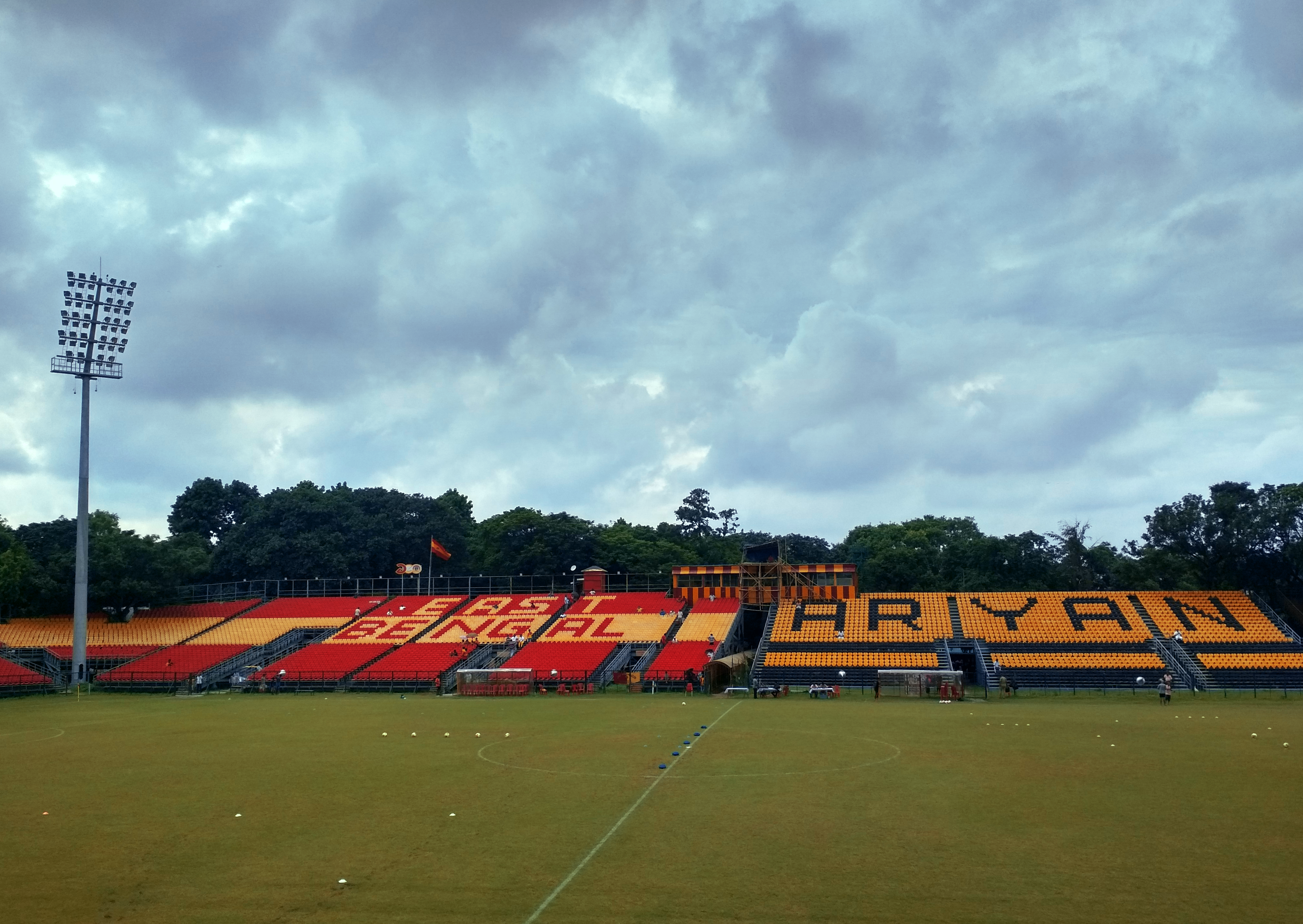
East Bengal Ground

The East Bengal Ground is located in Kolkata and is the club's historical home ground. The stadium lies in the Maidan (Kolkata) area on the northern side of Fort William and near the Eden Gardens. This stadium is used mostly for Calcutta Football League matches and by the academy, women's, and hockey teams. The total capacity of the stadium is 23,500.

=== Eden Gardens ===
The Eden Gardens is the second largest cricket stadium in India. The stadium currently has a capacity of 68,000 and formerly had a capacity of around 100,000. East Bengal has used this stadium on several occasions. For many games and seasons Eden Gardens served as the Home ground of the men's football team before the construction of Salt Lake Stadium. After its construction the club continued to use the stadium for its cricket teams.

=== Other grounds ===
Barasat Stadium is also used by the club for some regional matches, especially in cases where the Salt Lake Stadium or East Bengal Ground cannot be used. Kanchenjunga Stadium, a multipurpose stadium based in Siliguri, has also been used several times to host club football matches. It also hosted the 2012 Federation Cup. Kalyani Stadium, situated on the outskirts of Kolkata at Kalyani, was used by East Bengal as their home turf during the 2019–20 I-League.

The team also trains at one of the VYBK practice grounds.

== Management ==
As of November 2024

=== East Bengal Club ===
Role	Name
President	(India) Murari Lal Lohia
Chief advisor	(India) Pronab Dasgupta
Vice-presidents	(India) Ajoy Krishna Chatterjee (India) Shankar Bagri (India) Subhasish Chakraborty (India) Kalyan Majumdar
General secretary	(India) Rupak Saha
Assistant general secretary	(India) Santi Ranjan Dasgupta
Finance secretary	(India) Sadananda Mukherjee
Treasurer	(India) Debdas Samajdar
Football secretary	(India) Saikat Ganguly
Cricket secretary	(India) Sanjib Acharya
Hockey secretary	(India) Prabir Kumar Dafaddar
Athletic secretary	(India) Partha Pratim Roy
Tennis secretary	(India) Indranil Ghosh
Ground secretary	(India) Rajat Guha
Executive committee members	(India) Jhulan Goswami (India) Molly Ganguly (India) Sri Subir Ganguly (India) Santosh Bhattacharya (India) Diptendu Mohan Bose (India) Siddharta Sarkar (India) Debabrata Sarkar (India) Birendra Kumar Saha (India) Dipankar Chakraborty (India) Biswajit Mazumdar (India) Tapan Roy (India) Suman Dasgupta (India) Aritra Roy Chowdhury (India) Beni Madhab Bhattacharya (India) Manab Paul (India) Subhasish Dasgupta (India) Saroj Bhattacharjee (India) Debasish Bose (India) Bikash Dutta (India) Biplab Paul

== Honours ==
=== Football ===
Major trophies of East Bengal FC include the following:

Type	Competition	Titles	Seasons
International	ASEAN Club Championship	1	2003
Domestic	National Football League/Indian Super League	4	2000–01, 2002–03, 2003–04, 2025-26
Domestic	Federation Cup/Super Cup	9	1978, 1980, 1985, 1996, 2007, 2009–10, 2010, 2012, 2024
Domestic	Indian Super Cup	3	1997, 2006, 2011
Domestic	Durand Cup	17^{S}	1951, 1952, 1956, 1960, 1967, 1970, 1972, 1978, 1982, 1989, 1990, 1991, 1993, 1995, 2002, 2004 2026
Domestic	IFA Shield	29	1943, 1945, 1949, 1950, 1951, 1958, 1961, 1965, 1966, 1970, 1972, 1973, 1974, 1975, 1976, 1981, 1983, 1984, 1986, 1990, 1991, 1994, 1995, 1997, 2000, 2001, 2002, 2012, 2018
Domestic	Calcutta Football League	41	1942, 1945, 1946, 1949, 1950, 1952, 1961, 1966, 1970, 1971, 1972, 1973, 1974, 1975, 1977, 1982, 1985, 1987, 1988, 1989, 1991, 1993, 1995, 1996, 1998, 1999, 2000, 2002, 2003, 2004, 2006, 2010, 2011, 2012–13, 2013–14, 2014–15, 2015–16, 2016–17, 2017–18, 2025
Domestic	Rovers Cup	10	1949, 1962, 1967, 1969, 1972, 1973, 1975, 1980, 1990, 1994

- Record
- ^{S} Shared record

=== Cricket ===
- CAB First Division League

Champions (16): 1974-75, 1977-78, 1978-79, 1980-81, 1983-84, 1993-94, 1994-95, 1998-99, 2000-01, 2001-02, 2005-06, 2006-07, 2009-10, 2011-12, 2013-14, 2016-17

- CAB Senior Knockout

Champions (13): 1975-76, 1977-78, 1979-80, 1982-83, 1985-86, 1987-88, 1997-98, 2003-04, 2004-05, 2010-11, 2012-13, 2013-14, 2014-15

- J. C. Mukherjee Trophy

Champions (12): 1977-78, 1983-84, 1986-87, 1987- 88, 1993-94, 1997-98, 1998-99, 2003-04, 2004-05, 2005-06, 2009-10, 2016-17

- P. Sen Memorial Invitation Trophy

Champions (10): 1976-77, 1978-79, 1993-94, 1997-98, 1999-2000, 2001-02, 2003-04, 2011-12, 2013-14, 2016-17

- A. N. Ghosh Memorial Trophy

Champions (8): 1992-93, 1996-97, 1997-98, 1998-99, 2000-01, 2013-14, 2014-15, 2015-16

- CAB Super League

Champions (1): 2016-17

=== Hockey ===
- Calcutta Hockey League

Champions (10): 1960, 1961, 1963, 1964, 1968, 1973, 1976, 1979, 1989, 2022

- Beighton Cup

Champions (4): 1957, 1962, 1964, 1967
Runners-up (3): 1963, 1970, 1987

=== Awards ===
- Banga Bibhushan: 2022

== Affiliated clubs ==
(Bangladesh) Sheikh Russel KC (2022–present)

== See also ==
- East Bengal Club in international football
- East Bengal Club league record by opponent
- List of East Bengal Club wins against Foreign teams
- List of foreign players for East Bengal Club
- List of East Bengal Club records and statistics
- Indian football clubs in Asian competitions
