= Calcutta Hockey League =

Indian field hockey league

- Sport: Field hockey
- Founded: 1905; 121 years ago
- Owner: Hockey Bengal
- Administrator: Hockey Bengal
- Country: India
- Headquarters: Kolkata
- Most recent champions: Mohun Bagan (27 title)
- Most titles: Mohun Bagan (27 titles)
- Website: hockeybengal.org

Calcutta Hockey League is a field hockey league organized by Hockey Bengal (formerly the Bengal Hockey Association). The first edition was held in 1905. It is a division based league held at Kolkata and is the oldest field hockey league in India. Until the formation of the top division national leagues such as Premier Hockey League and Hockey India League post 2000s, the Calcutta Hockey League was the most competitive league in the country.

== History ==
The league was first held in 1905, ten years after the initiation of Beighton Cup Tournament and three years before the formation of the Bengal Hockey Association (BHA) in 1908. It is considered the next prominent competition to Beighton Cup in status and eminence. The First Division commenced in 1905, and later expanded to the Second Division in 1907, Third Division in 1920, Fourth Division in 1932 and Division ll - B in 1933. The competition has been held annually ever since, except the year of partition in 1947.

The early years were dominated by the collegiate teams such as Sibpur B.E. College followed by the prominence of the Anglo-Indian club Calcutta Rangers and the Calcutta Customs throughout the 1910s and 1920s decades. The first team composed of Indian players to win the league was Greer Sporting who managed the feat in 1919. Later years and post-Independence era were dominated by the "Big Three" of Kolkata, Mohun Bagan, Mohammedan Sporting and East Bengal.

== League structure ==
The current league structure consists of the First Division which has two groups played across two tiers at the senior level. The Second Division and Third Division is held at U19 and U17 level. The top six teams of First Division Group A competes for Premier Hockey League while top four teams of First Division Group B competes for Super Hockey League. From the 2023 season, following the group stage matches, the first division teams move into Premier Hockey League and Placement rounds. The winner of Premier Hockey League round are crowned champions of the league.

Calcutta Hockey League
Tier	Division
I	First Division Group A
II	First Division Group B
III	Second Division
IV	Third Division

== Venue ==
The matches are held at SAI Sports Complex at Salt Lake Stadium, Mohun Bagan Ground and East Bengal Ground.

== Results ==
The results of the Calcutta Hockey League:

Year	Winner
1905	B.E. College Sibpur
1906	B.E. College Sibpur
1907	B.E. College Sibpur
1908	Calcutta Customs
1909	Calcutta Customs
1910	Calcutta Customs
1911	B.E. College Sibpur
1912	Calcutta Customs
1913	Calcutta Customs
1914	Calcutta Rangers
1915	Calcutta Rangers
1916	Calcutta Rangers
1917	Calcutta Rangers
1918	Military Medicals
1919	Greer SC
1920	B.E. College Sibpur
1921	Calcutta Customs
1922	Calcutta Customs
1923	Greer SC
1924	Xaverians
1925	Xaverians
1926	Calcutta Customs
1927	Calcutta Customs
1928	Calcutta Rangers
1929	Calcutta Rangers
1930	Calcutta Customs
1931	Calcutta Customs
1932	Calcutta Customs
1933	Calcutta Customs
1934	Calcutta Rangers
1935	Mohun Bagan
1936	Calcutta Customs
1937	Calcutta Customs
1938	Calcutta Customs
1939	Calcutta Customs
1940	B G Press
1941	Police AC
1942	Port Commissioners
1943	Calcutta Rangers
1944	Port Commissioners
1945	Mohammedan Sporting
1946	Port Commissioners
1947	Not held due to Partition
1948	Port Commissioners
1949	Port Commissioners
1950	Calcutta Customs
1951	Mohun Bagan
1952	Mohun Bagan
1953	Bhowanipore
1954	Bhowanipore
1955	Mohun Bagan
1956	Mohun Bagan
1957	Mohun Bagan
1958	Mohun Bagan
1959	Mohammedan Sporting
1960	East Bengal
1961	Calcutta Customs and East Bengal - joint winners
1962	Mohun Bagan
1963	Calcutta Customs
1964	East Bengal
1965	Bengal Nagpur Railway
1966	Bengal Nagpur Railway
1967	Bengal Nagpur Railway
1968	East Bengal
1969	Mohun Bagan
1970	Mohun Bagan
1971	Mohun Bagan
1972	Mohun Bagan
1973	East Bengal
1974	Mohun Bagan
1975	Mohun Bagan
1976	East Bengal
1977	Mohun Bagan
1978	Mohun Bagan
1979	East Bengal
1980	Mohun Bagan
1981	Mohun Bagan
1982	Eastern Railway
1983	MMC
1984	MMC
1985	CESC
1986	Mohun Bagan
1987	Mohun Bagan
1988	Mohun Bagan
1989	East Bengal
1990	FCI
1991	FCI
1992	FCI
1993	CESC
1994	Bengal Nagpur Railway
1995	Mohun Bagan
1996	Calcutta Customs
1997	Mohun Bagan
1998	Mohun Bagan
1999	Mohun Bagan
2000	SAI Training Center
2001	CESC
2002	CESC
2003	Calcutta Customs
2004	CESC
2005	CC&FC
2006	CESC
2007	CESC
2008	Punjab SC
2009	CESC
2010	Punjab SC
2011	Punjab SC
2012	Punjab SC
2013	CC&FC
2014	CC&FC
2015	CESC
2016	Punjab SC
2017	Eastern Railway
2018	Eastern Railway
2019	CESC
2020	Not held due to COVID-19 pandemic
2021	Punjab SC
2022	East Bengal
2023	Mohun Bagan
2024	East Bengal
2025	Mohun Bagan

== See also ==
- Field hockey in India
