= Basic service element =

In telecommunications, a basic service element (BSE) is:

1. An optional unbundled feature, generally associated with the basic serving arrangement (BSA), that an enhanced-service provider (ESP) may require or find useful in configuring an enhanced service.
2. A fundamental (basic) communication network service; an optional network capability associated with a BSA.

BSEs constitute optional capabilities to which the customer may subscribe or decline to subscribe.
