= Fluid Components International =

Fluid Components International A PST Brand
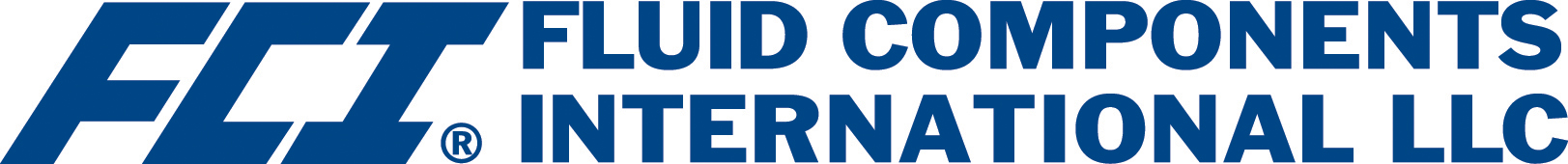
- Type: Private
- Industry: Instrumentation, Process Automation, Aerospace, Nuclear
- Founded: 1964
- Headquarters: San Marcos, California
- Key people: Randall J. Brown (President); Nick Bitsimis (CFO); John Kharsa (GM-Aerospace); Eric Wible (Exec Director Engineering and Operations)
- Products: Thermal mass flowmeters, air/gas mass flow meters, biogas flow meters, flow switches, level switches, flow sensors, pressure sensors, temperature sensors, flow conditioners
- Website: https://www.fluidcomponents.com/

Fluid Components International (FCI), headquartered in San Marcos, California. In November 2023, FCI was acquired by Process Sensing Technologies (PST). FCI is a manufacturer of thermal dispersion technology flow and level measurement instrumentation. FCI has three business units: One serving customers with measurement needs in industrial process and plant applications; An aerospace division which design and manufactures level, flow, temperature, and pressure sensors for onboard both fixed wing and rotary aircraft; and FCI-Nuclear which manufactures level and flow measurement instruments for the unique and specific applications in nuclear power plants. FCI was a pioneer in developing thermal dispersion technology and holds numerous design and technology patents for its application in flow and level measurement.

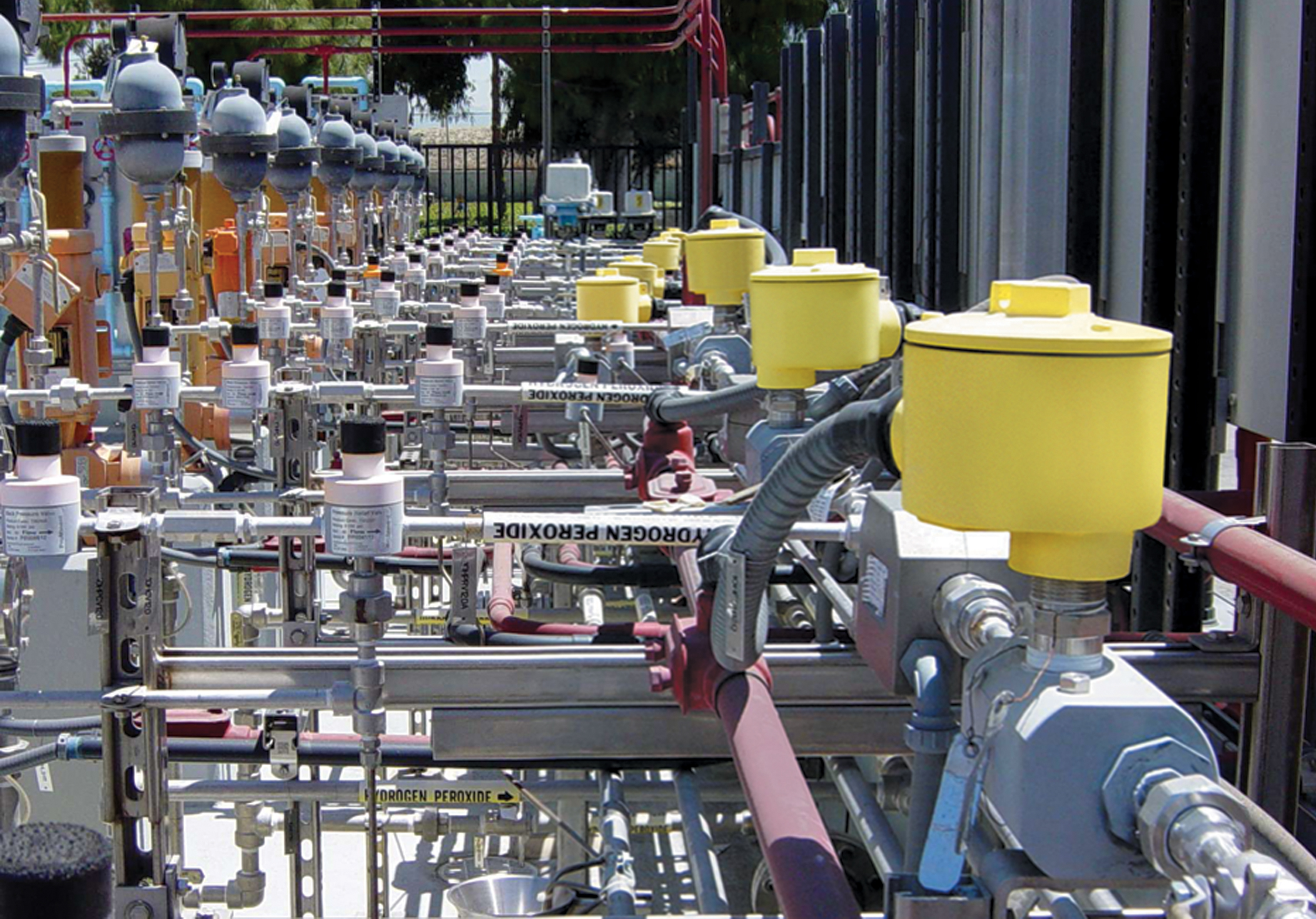
FCI's FLT93 flow switches installed in Orange County Sanitation District's chemical injection process

FCI products include gas mass flow meters, air flow meters, biogas flow meters, thermal mass flow meters, gas flow switches, liquid flow switches, flow sensors, level switches, and flow conditioners. FCI Aerospace products include sensors, meters and switches for liquid level, flow, temperature, and pressure.

FCI's quality management system is ISO 9001 and AS 9100 certified..

FCI operates a NIST flow calibration laboratory with 19 precision flow stands. FCI utilizes these precision flow stands to flow actual gases and reference fluids matched to the temperature, process conditions, and line size of individual customers' flow meter applications.

The company has subsidiaries in Tilburg, Netherlands and Beijing, China. FCI is represented in 105 countries and has full factory service centers located in the United States, Europe, Asia, and the Middle East.

== History ==
FCI was founded in 1964 in Canoga Park, California by Robert (Bob) Deane and Malcom (Mac) McQueen.

In 1978, FCI began its nuclear division to deliver level, flow, and temperature measurement solutions to the nuclear power industry. These products have the certifications and credentials that comply with global standards for nuclear plant installations.

In 1980, FCI relocated its corporate and manufacturing headquarters to San Marcos, California (near San Diego). In order to support FCI's increasing international customer base, the company opened the European Sales and Service Center in the Netherlands in 1993.

In 2001, FCI received AS 9100 certification. FCI's design, manufacturing and calibration systems, processes, and facilities are continuously reviewed and audited.

In 2010, Control Global Magazine Reader Choice awards for Thermal Flowmeters and Flow Switches were awarded to FCI.

in 2023, acquired by Process Sensing Technologies (PST)
