= Ashutosh Agnihotri =

Indian Administrative Service officer of the 1999 batch

Personal details
- Born: 11 March 1974 (age 52) Kanpur, Uttar Pradesh, India
- Education: Master of Arts; Master of Science; Bachelor of Science
- Occupation: Civil servant

Ashutosh Agnihotri is an Indian poet, writer and Indian Administrative Service officer of the 1999 batch. He is currently serving as additional Secretary in the Ministry of Environment, Forest & Climate Change (MoEFCC).

== Early life and education ==
Agnihotri was born on 11 March 1974 in Kanpur district of Uttar Pradesh.

He completed his schooling at Sir Padampat Singhania Education Centre in Kanpur. He holds a Bachelor of Science degree and a Master’s degree in English Literature from Christ Church College, Kanpur University. In 2016, he also earned a Master’s degree in Public Management and Governance from the London School of Economics and Political Science.

== Works ==
Agnihotri has served in various key roles across both the state and central governments. His career began in the Assam-Meghalaya cadre, where he held the positions of Deputy Commissioner and District Magistrate in Dibrugarh, Nalbari, and Kamrup (Metro) districts. He also served as Commissioner and Secretary to the Government of Assam.

From 2020 to 2025, he served as Joint Secretary and later as Additional Secretary in the Ministry of Home Affairs.

Previously, he served as Chairman and Managing Director of the Food Corporation of India and as Chairman of the Central Warehousing Corporation.

== Notable work ==
- Os Ki Thapaki
- Kucch Adhure Shabd
- The Light of Love and Other Stories
- Spandan
