= Mohun Bagan AC =

Indian professional multi-sports club based in Kolkata, West Bengal

Mohun Bagan Athletic Club
- Full name: Mohun Bagan Athletic Club
- Nickname: The Mariners
- Short name: MBAC
- Founded: 15 August 1889; 137 years ago (as Mohun Bagan Sporting Club)
- Colors: Green; Maroon
- President: Debasish Dutta
- Website: www.themohunbaganac.com

Mohun Bagan Athletic Club is an Indian professional multi-sports club based in Kolkata, West Bengal. Founded on 15 August 1889, it is one of the oldest multi-sports clubs in Asia. The club mainly has six sports departments: football, cricket, field hockey, tennis, athletics and eSports. Mohun Bagan is widely regarded as one of the most influential clubs in Indian sports history.

== History ==
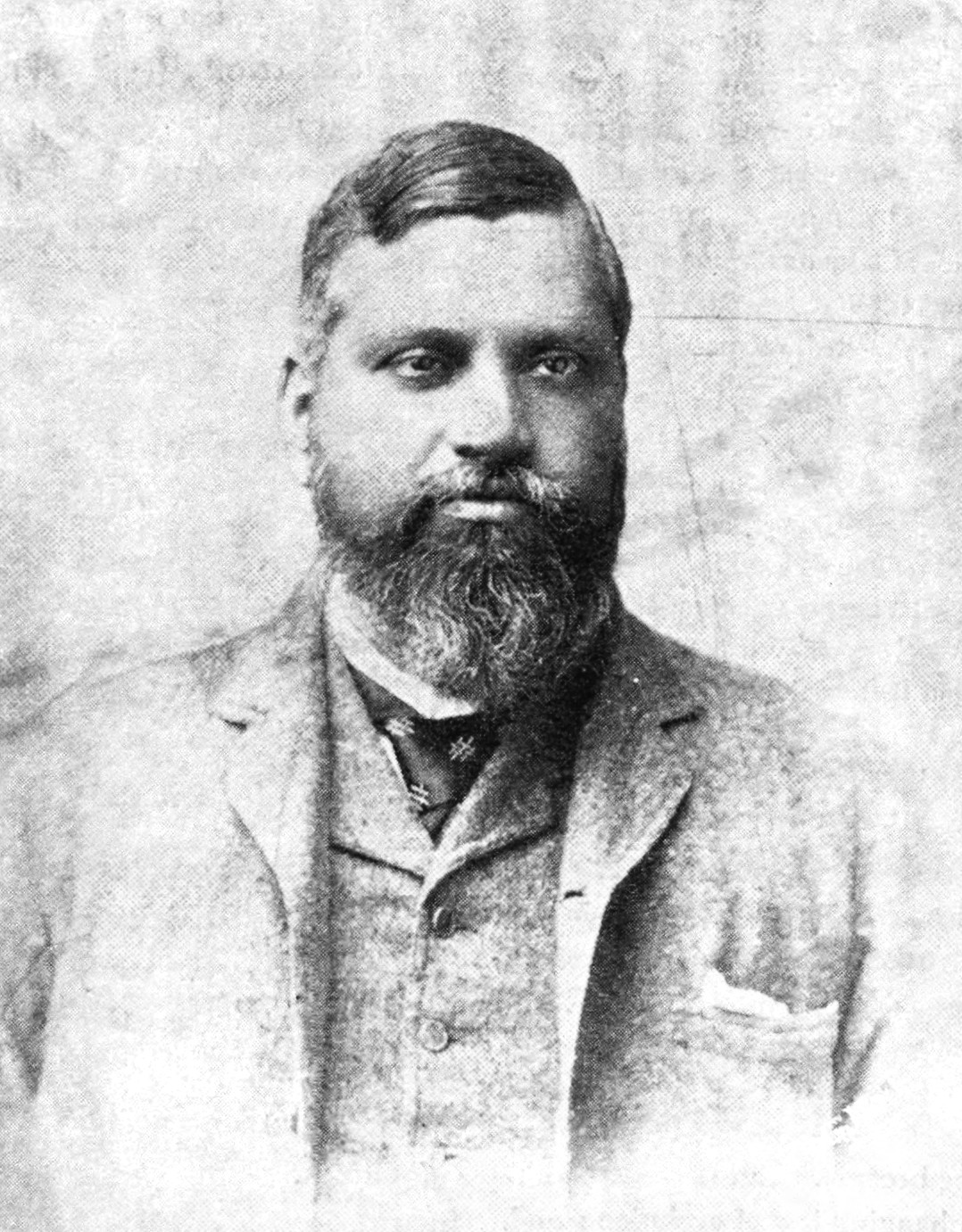
Bhupendra Nath Bose, the first president of Mohun Bagan

The foundation of Mohun Bagan stretches back into the 1880s when the neighborhood youth of presently known Fariapukur Lane in Shyambazar had set out in search for an ideal place to establish a football club, and came across a marble palace, Mohun Bagan Villa, owned by the family of a leading jute trader, Kirti Chandra Mitra.

On 15 August 1889, after a meeting of three prominent aristocratic Bengali families of North Kolkata – the Mitra family, the Basu family, and the Sen family – presided over by Bhupendra Nath Basu himself, Mohun Bagan Sporting Club was formed. Bhupendra Nath Basu became the first president of the newly founded club and Jyotindra Nath Basu was the first secretary of it.

During the initial years, the meager ground inside the palace was used by the club for hosting matches, including their first match that was played against the team of Eden Hindu Hostel students, and lost 1–0. The club management hugely emphasized providing memberships to the youth and maintained a strict code of conduct with an avowed objective of producing excellent sportsmen and imbuing them with impeccable moral and social values.

At the first-anniversary assembly, the Presidency College students and members of the club invited their professor, F. J. Rowe, to attend. Rowe pointed out the inappropriate naming of the club and suggested replacing "Sporting" with "Athletic" since the club didn't indulge in sporting activities, like angling or rifle shooting. Thus, the members agreed and renamed the club as Mohun Bagan Athletic Club.

The second-anniversary assembly was presided by Sir Thomas Holland, who later became a member of the Executive Council of Governor-General of India. In 1891, with the help of the Maharaja Durga Charan Laha of Shyampukur, the club ground was relocated within his residential estate, now known as Laha Colony. The club ground was later relocated to Shyam Square in Bagbazar, with the help of the Kolkata Municipal Corporation chairman, Henry Lee. In 1900, Mohun Bagan became the partner of Presidency College and shared their ground at Maidan, where they would continue to play for 15 years.

Mohun Bagan have a fierce rivalry with East Bengal, which is mainly focused on the century old footballing rivalry of the two clubs and they play the Kolkata Derby which is referred to as 'Boro Match' (Big Match) in Kolkata. However, cricket and hockey matches between Mohun Bagan and East Bengal have also witnessed some fierce contests, significant crowds and clashes among the supporters of the two clubs. Mohun Bagan also have a rivalry with Mohammedan, with whom they play the 'Mini Derby' and is also mainly a footballing rivalry.

== Structure ==
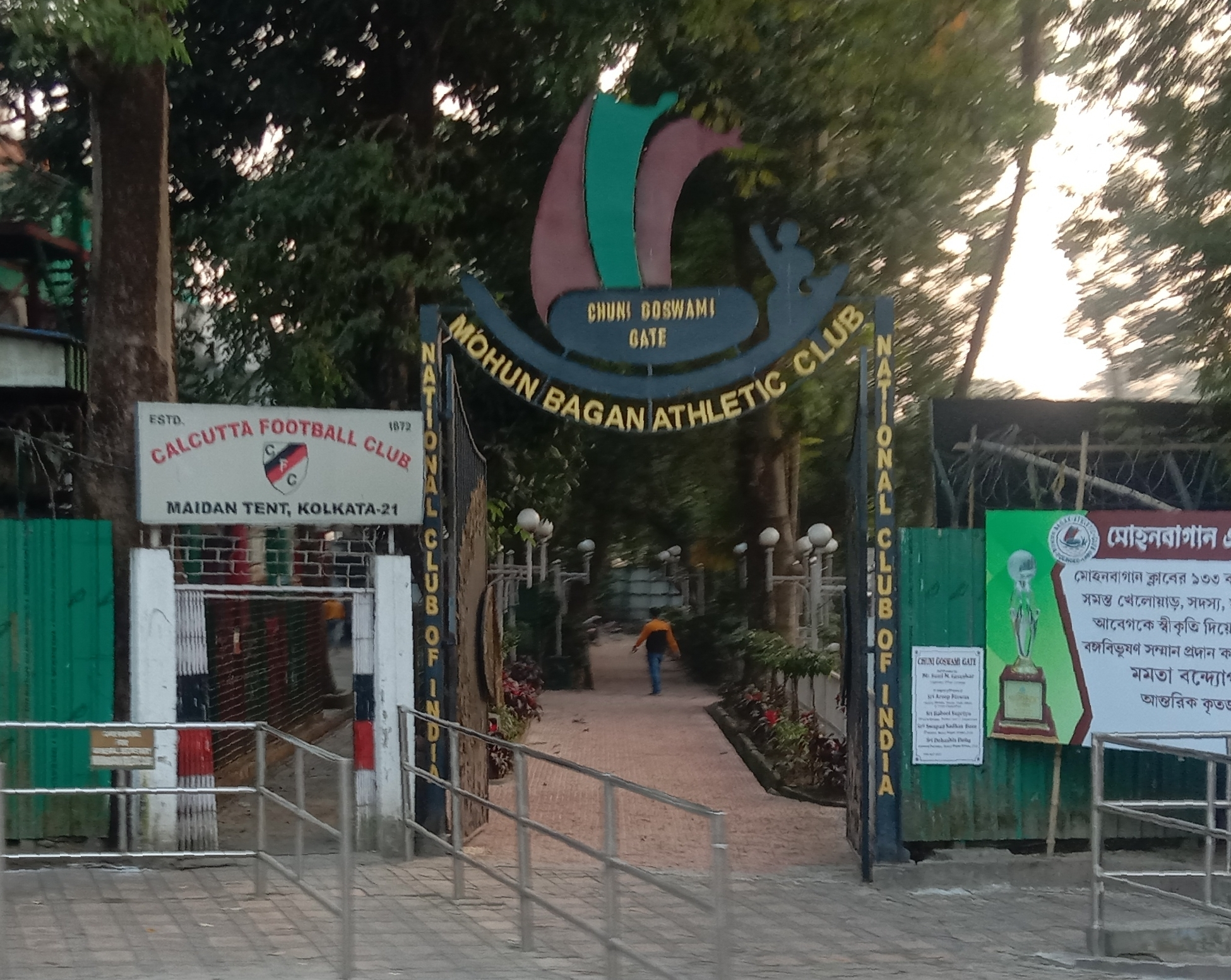
Newly built Chuni Goswami Gate of Mohun Bagan AC in December 2023.

Mohun Bagan is registered as a society under Societies Registration Act, 1860 and West Bengal Societies Registration Act, 1961. Unlike many other top sports clubs in the country which are limited companies, it is not possible to purchase shares in the club, but only membership. The registered members forms the Mohun Bagan Society, which takes part in the general elections for the appointment for various posts. The club is governed by its own "constitution". Amendments and resolutions are passed via annual general meetings.

== Management ==
Office	Name
President	Debasish Dutta
Vice president	Shoumik Bose
Vice president	Manash Kumar Bhattacharya
Vice president	Uttam Kumar Saha
Vice president	Debasis Mitra
General Secretary	Srinjoy Bose
Assistant General Secretary	Satyajit Chatterjee
Finance Secretary	Surajit Basu
Planning & Development Secretary	Ranjan Basu
Football Secretary	Swapan Banerjee
Youth Football Secretary	Shilton Paul
Cricket Secretary	Samrat Bhowmick
Hockey Secretary	Shyamal Mitra
Tennis Secretary	Sidhartha Roy
Athletics Secretary	Pintu Biswas
Treasurer	Sandipan Banerjee
Executive Members	Someswar Bagui
Executive Members	Anupam Sahoo
Executive Members	Debaprasad Mukherjee
Executive Members	Debajyoti Basu
Executive Members	Kashi Nath Das
Executive Members	Mukul Sinha
Executive Members	Parthajit Das
Executive Members	Ranjan Bosu
Executive Members	Sanjoy Majumder
Executive Members	Sohini Mitra Chaubey
Executive Members	Sudipta Ghosh
Co-Operative Executive Members	Debashis Roy
Co-Operative Executive Members	Arijit Banerjee
Co-Operative Executive Members	Sanjoy Ghosh

Last updated: 16 June 2025
Source: Mohun Bagan Athletic Club

== Departments ==
Mohun Bagan Athletic Club, established on 15 August 1889, gradually developed into one of India’s most prominent multi-sports institutions. The club mainly has six sports departments: football, cricket, field hockey, tennis, athletics and eSports. Football remained the club’s primary sport, while cricket was introduced in the early 20th century, followed by departments such as field hockey, tennis, athletics and e-sports in later years.

The club became a major force in Indian football after winning the historic 1911 IFA Shield against East Yorkshire Regiment on 29 July 1911. Mohun Bagan is currently the most successful football club in India and has become the champions of India for a record seventh time.

Mohun Bagan also made important contributions to the development of several other sports in Bengal and India. Over the decades, the club has produced and represented numerous national-level athletes across different disciplines. Due to its long sporting legacy and consistent success, Mohun Bagan is widely regarded as one of the most influential clubs in Indian sports history.

=== Football ===
The Mohun Bagan football team is the most distinguished and revered department of this club. It was the original department with which the club was founded in 1889. The team plays its home matches mostly at the Vivekananda Yuba Bharati Krirangan and also at the Mohun Bagan Ground. It competes in the Indian Super League, the top tier of Indian football league system. The team is most notable for its victory over the East Yorkshire Regiment in the 1911 IFA Shield final. It is the most successful team in the country. In its 130th year of existence, the team was inducted into the "Club of Pioneers", a network of the oldest existing football clubs around the world, on 29 July 2019.

=== Cricket ===
The Mohun Bagan cricket team participates in various tournaments for varying age groups conducted by the Cricket Association of Bengal. Currently, it participates in the CAB First Division League, CAB Senior Knockout, CAB Super League, and JC Mukherjee Trophy. The team plays its home matches mostly at the Eden Gardens and also at the Jadavpur University Campus Ground. They have won over 100 major state-level trophies so far. In past many big names like Sourav Ganguly, Sachin Tendulkar, Virat Kohli, MS Dhoni and even Sri Lankan player Chaminda Vaas had played for the club.

=== Hockey ===
The Mohun Bagan hockey team participates in various tournaments for varying age groups conducted by the Hockey Bengal. The team plays its home matches mostly at the SAI Sports Complex of Salt Lake Stadium and also at the Mohun Bagan Ground. The club participates in the Calcutta Hockey League and the Beighton Cup. The team have won 41 major state titles which includes 25 CHL and 14 Beighton Cup titles.

=== Tennis ===
Mohun Bagan had an active tennis department as part of its multi-sports structure, alongside football, cricket, hockey and Athletics. The club participated in local tennis activities and helped promote lawn tennis culture in Kolkata during the early years of Indian sports.

=== Athletics ===
Mohun Bagan has an athletics team, which is affiliated with the West Bengal Athletics Association, and participates in various meets of West Bengal. The club also organizes Annual Athletics meet at the club ground.

=== eSports ===
Mohun Bagan also took part in the inaugural season of e-ISL where the ISL teams competed to play the video game FIFA 22.

== Club awards ==
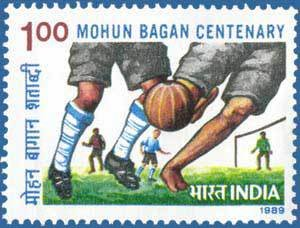
Mohun Bagan Centenary postage stamp, 1989

Since 2001, 29 July is celebrated as Mohun Bagan Day in honor of the club's victory over East Yorkshire Regiment in the 1911 IFA Shield Final. To commemorate the day, the club organises an award distribution ceremony along with various festivities. Mohun Bagan Ratna is an award presented each year on Mohun Bagan Day to outstanding former players, irrespective of the sports played. The first recipient was former footballer Sailen Manna. Apart from the Mohun Bagan Ratna, other awards are also presented which often differ in categories each year, except for an award for the best footballer and cricketer of the season which were presented for most of the years.

== Honours ==
- Banga Bibhushan: 2022 (the highest civilian honour in West Bengal given by the Government of West Bengal)

== See also ==
- Mohun Bagan Super Giant
- Mohun Bagan SG Youth
- Mohun Bagan cricket team
- Mohun Bagan field hockey team
- Mohun Bagan AC season awards
