= Sail switch =

A sail switch is a type of proving switch used for the detection of flow and is actuated on or off in response to the flow or non-flow of a fluid such as air or water. A sail switch typically operates through the use of a paddle (the sail) which gets displaced due to the force of the fluid moving over it.

A sail switch might be used to protect a fan-forced pellet stove, a central heating system, or an electric heating element from being energized before the air flow from the blower is established. Sail switches might also be used to alarm if a ventilation fan in a hazardous location fails, causing air flow to stop. For some HVAC systems, a sail switch can activate an electronic air cleaner, a humidifier, or other equipment in response to airflow from the system fan.
