= Food Corporation of India FC =

Food Corporation of India
- Full name: Food Corporation of India Football Club
- Short name: FCIFC
- Founded: 1969; 57 years ago
- Ground: Various
- Owner: Food Corporation of India
- League: CFL 1st Division
Home colours	Away colours

Food Corporation of India Football Club is an Indian institutional football club based in Kolkata, West Bengal. The club, also known as FCI East Zone, plays in the Calcutta Football League Premier Division.

== History ==
The club represents the sports section of the Food Corporation of India and is controlled through the FCI Sports Promotion Board. The Board was constituted in 1969 and several committees control the departments at zonal & regional levels. It is affiliated to the Indian Football Association and has participated in several divisions of the Calcutta Football League.

In June 2023, FCI was included in the group I of the CFL Premier Division, after the Indian Football Association (IFA) announced merger of both Premier Division A and B of the Calcutta Football League, ahead of its 125th edition.

== Notable players ==
- Krishanu Dey
- Aloke Mukherjee
- Mehtab Hossain
- Deepak Mondal
- Atanu Bhattacharya
- Narender Thapa Patit Paban Mondal

== Honours ==
- Trades Cup
  - Champions (1): 2014
  - Runners-up (1): 2011
- Nripendra Narayan Bhattacharjee Trophy
  - Champions (1): 2004

== Other department ==
=== Men's hockey ===
FCI (eastern zone) has its men's hockey team, which is affiliated with the Bengal Hockey Association, and competes in the Calcutta Hockey League.

Honours

- Calcutta Hockey League
  - Champions (3): 1990, 1991, 1992
