= Complementary network service =

In telecommunications, a complementary network service (CNS) is a means for an enhanced-service provider customer to connect to a network and to the enhanced service provider.

Complementary network services usually consist of the customer local service, such as a business or residence, and several associated service features, such as a call-forwarding service.
