= East Bengal field hockey team =

Indian professional field hockey club

- Full name: East Bengal Club
- Short name: East Bengal
- League: Calcutta Hockey League
- Founded: 1947; 79 years ago
- Colors: Red and Gold
- Home ground: East Bengal Ground (Capacity 23,500)

Personnel
- Coach: Jagraj Singh
- Website: Club website

East Bengal hockey team is an Indian professional field hockey team located in Kolkata, West Bengal. It participates in various tournaments conducted by Hockey Bengal. The team plays its home matches mostly at the East Bengal Ground and also at the SAI Sports Complex at Salt Lake Stadium.

The club participates in the Calcutta Hockey League and the Beighton Cup. The team have won fourteen major state titles as of the 2022 season,

== History ==
East Bengal Club started their hockey section after the Indian Independence in 1947 and got affiliated with the Bengal Hockey Association (BHA). The Club participated in the Calcutta Hockey League and the Beighton Cup and were the fourth Indian hockey team to win the Calcutta Hockey League in the 1960 season.

The club disbanded their hockey section in 2000, but was eventually revived after 21 years in 2021. In the next season in 2022, East Bengal won their tenth CHL title after 33 years.

== Honours ==
=== League ===
- Calcutta Hockey League
  - Champions (10): 1960, 1961, 1964, 1968, 1973, 1976, 1979, 1989, 2022, 2024

=== Cup ===
- Beighton Cup
  - Champions (4): 1957, 1962, 1964, 1967
  - Runners-up (3): 1963, 1970, 1987

== Current squad ==
The squad for the 2022 season:

- Vikas Dahiya
- Pardeep Mor
- Anup Valmiki
- Yuvraj Valmiki
- Manpreet
- Ajit Pandey
- Roshan Kumar
- Harjeet Singh
- Chandan Singh
- Maninder Singh
- Prabhjot Singh
- Iqtidar Israt
- First Sharma
- Aditya Singh
- Nitish Neopane
- Rohit
- Balkar Singh
- Yograj Singh
- Raju Pal
- Atul Island
- Mohit
- Arjun Yadav
- Pawan Singh Chauhan
- Naresh Kumar Chowdhury

== Notable players ==
Notable players who have represented East Bengal Club includes Olympians Gurbux Singh, Joginder Singh, B. P. Govinda, Inam-ur Rahman, Vece Paes, Mohammed Shahid.
