= Mohun Bagan field hockey team =

Indian professional field hockey club based in Kolkata, West Bengal

- Full name: Mohun Bagan Athletic Club
- Nickname(s): The Mariners
- Short name: MBAC
- Founded: 15 August 1889; 135 years ago
- Ground: Howrah Dumurjola Stadium; Mohun Bagan Ground
- Capacity: 22,000
- President: Debasish Dutta
- Manager: Gurmeet Singh
- Coach: Simranjeet Singh
- League: Calcutta Hockey League
- Website: www.themohunbaganac.com
Home colours	Away colours

Mohun Bagan hockey team is an Indian professional field hockey team based in Kolkata, West Bengal. It participates in various tournaments conducted by Hockey Bengal. The team plays its home matches mostly at the Mohun Bagan Ground, SAI Sports Complex at Salt Lake Stadium and Howrah Dumurjola Stadium. The team has won 41 major state titles, which includes 27 Calcutta Hockey League and 14 Beighton Cup titles.

== History ==
Mohun Bagan started their field hockey section in the early 1930s and got affiliated with the Bengal Hockey Association (BHA). The Club participated in the Calcutta Hockey League and the Beighton Cup and were the second Indian field hockey club to win the Calcutta Hockey League after Greer Sporting in the 1935 season.

The club disbanded their hockey section in 2000, but was eventually revived after 22 years in 2022.

== Statistics ==
As of 28 March 2025

Season	Tournament	Result	Played	Won	Draw	Lose
2024–25	Calcutta Premier Hockey League	Champions	8	7	1	0

== Honours ==
=== League ===
- Calcutta Hockey League
  - Champions (27): 1935, 1951, 1952, 1955, 1956, 1957, 1958, 1962, 1969, 1970, 1971, 1972, 1974, 1975, 1977, 1978, 1980, 1981, 1986, 1987, 1988, 1995, 1997, 1998, 1999, 2023, 2025

=== Cup ===
- Beighton Cup
  - Champions (14): 1952, 1958, 1960, 1964, 1965, 1968, 1969, 1971, 1973, 1974, 1975, 1977, 1978, 1979
  - Runners-up (3): 1956, 1972, 1980
- Agha Khan Cup
  - Champions (1): 1964
- Bombay Gold Cup
  - Champions (1): 1964
  - Runners-up (1): 1970

== Notable players ==
Notable players who have represented Mohun Bagan includes olympians Keshav Dutt, Ashok Kumar, Jaswant Singh Rajput, Joginder Singh, Inam-ur Rahman etc.
