= Calcutta Customs Club =

Indian institutional multi-sports club from Kolkata

Calcutta Customs ক্যালকাটা কাস্টমস
- Full name: Calcutta Customs Club
- Short name: CCC
- Founded: 1892; 134 years ago
- Owner: Kolkata Customs
- Head coach: Biswajit Bhattacharya
- League: CFL Premier Division
Home colours	Away colours	Third colours

Calcutta Customs Club (Bengali: ক্যালকাটা কাস্টমস ক্লাব) is an Indian institutional multi-sports club based in Kolkata, West Bengal. It is best known for its football section, which competes in the Calcutta Football League.

== History ==
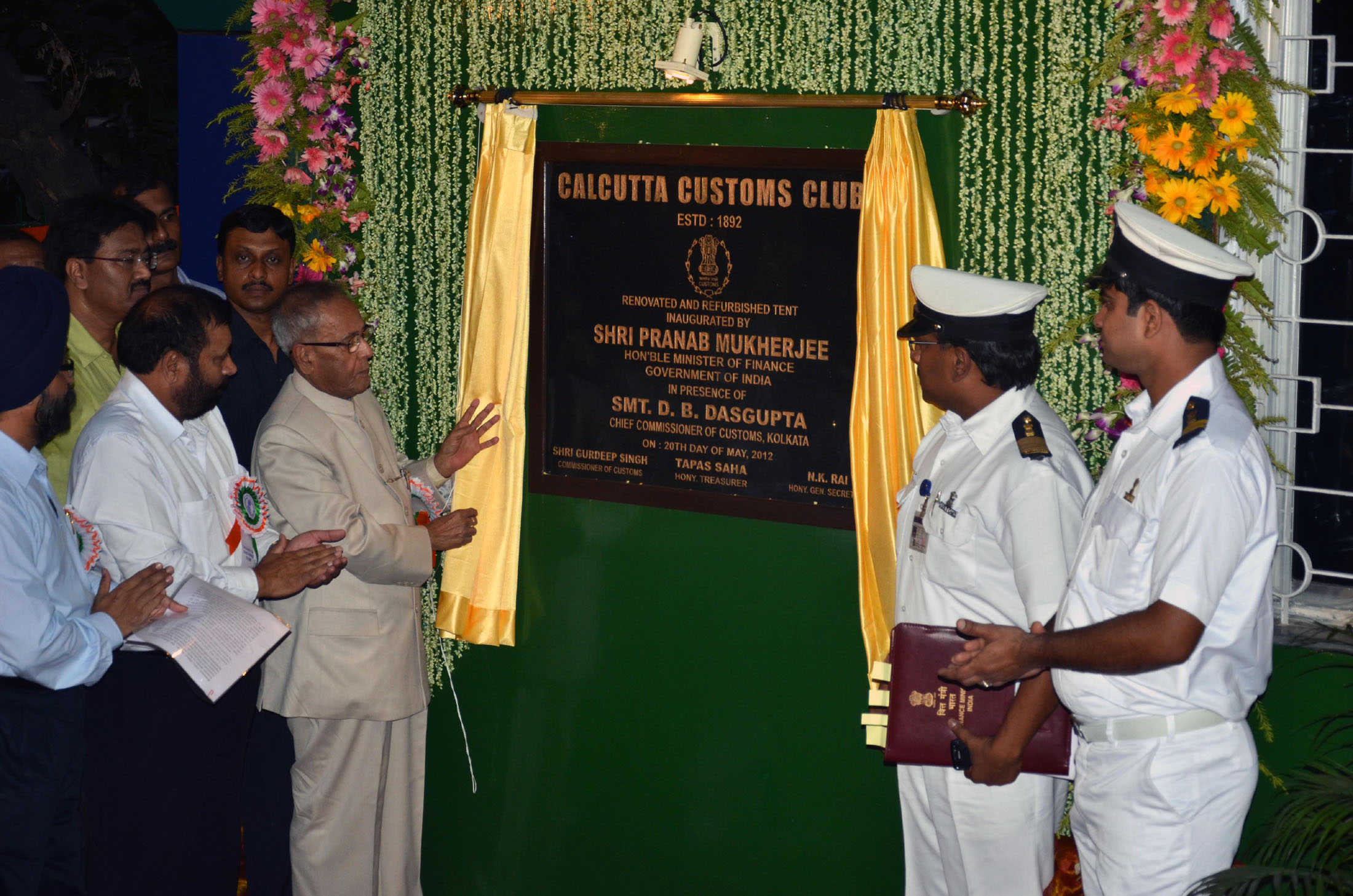
Newly renovated club tent of Calcutta Customs at the Maidan area being inaugurated by the then Union Finance Minister, Pranab Mukherjee, on May 20, 2012.

The club was established in 1892 as an institutional club of Calcutta Customs (now known as 'Kolkata Customs'). During the British rule in India, they achieved success at the IFA Shield, in which the club gained runner-up position in 1908, 1909, 1915, and 1939. In 2004, Calcutta Customs traveled to Bhutan and took part in the Bhutan King's Cup in which they competed in Group B. In the Calcutta Football League season of 2021–22, Calcutta Customs was managed by Biswajit Bhattacharya.

In June 2023, the Indian Football Association (IFA) announced the merger of both Premier Division A and B of the Calcutta Football League ahead of its 125th edition, in which Calcutta Customs was placed in Group II.

== Honours ==
=== Association football ===
- IFA Shield
  - Runners-up (4): 1908, 1909, 1915, 1939
- Sikkim Gold Cup
  - Runners-up (1): 2017
- Manik Upadhayay Memorial Trophy
  - Champions (1): 2022
- Naihati Gold Cup
  - Champions (1): 2023

== Other departments ==
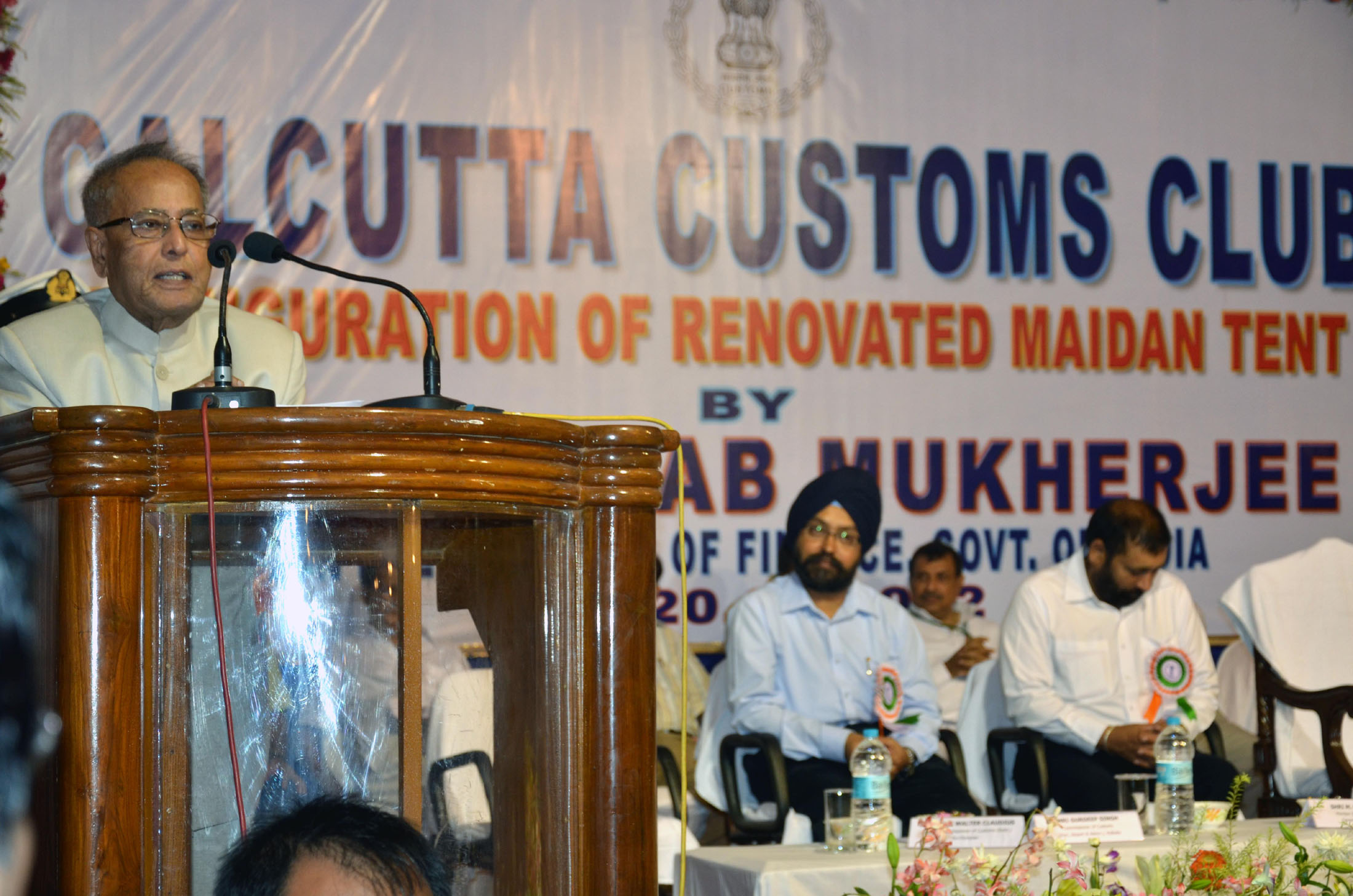
Then Union Finance Minister Pranab Mukherjee addressing at the inaugural ceremony of the Calcutta Customs Club's renovated Maidan Tent, named after Padma Shree Leslie Claudius, Kolkata, May 20, 2012.

Calcutta Customs has its field hockey and cricket divisions since its foundation. Club's cricket team participates in the tournaments of the Cricket Association of Bengal, and competes in the Second Division League.

=== Field hockey ===
The hockey team of Calcutta Customs is affiliated with the Bengal Hockey Association, and competes in the Calcutta Hockey League and Beighton Cup, one of the oldest field hockey tournaments in the world. The hockey team is among the most successful clubs in domestic tournaments, especially during the pre-independence years when Anglo-Indians used to dominate field hockey. Legendary hockey player Major Dhyan Chand rated the 1933 Beighton Cup final between Jhansi Heroes and Calcutta Customs the most memorable match of his career in his autobiography Goal, saying "If anybody asked me which was the best match that I played in, I will unhesitatingly say that it was the 1933 Beighton Cup final between Calcutta Customs and Jhansi Heroes. Calcutta Customs was a great side those days".

==== Notable players ====
The players below, represented Calcutta Customs in domestic hockey tournaments, alongside playing for the India national team:

- (British Raj) Shaukat Ali - member of India hockey team that won the gold medal at the 1928 Summer Olympic Games.
- (British Raj) Leslie Claudius – member of India hockey team that won the gold medals at the 1948, 1952 and 1956, and silver medal at the 1960 Summer Olympic Games.
- Gurbux Singh – member of the India hockey team that won gold medal at the 1964 Summer Olympics, bronze medal at the 1968 Summer Olympics and the gold medal at the 1966 Asian Games.

==== Honours ====
- Calcutta Hockey League
  - Champions (22): 1908, 1909, 1910, 1912, 1913, 1921, 1922, 1926, 1927, 1930, 1931, 1932, 1933, 1936, 1937, 1938, 1939, 1950, 1961, 1963, 1996, 2003
- Beighton Cup
  - Champions (12): 1908, 1909, 1910, 1912, 1925, 1926, 1930, 1931, 1932, 1935, 1938, 1965
  - Runners-up (10): 1915, 1916, 1922, 1923, 1927, 1928, 1929, 1933, 1936, 1939
- Bombay Gold Cup
  - Runners-up (1): 1964
- Aga Khan Gold Cup
  - Runners-up (1): 1932

=== Cricket ===
The men's cricket section of Calcutta Customs is affiliated to the Cricket Association of Bengal (CAB), and participate in regional tournaments such as First Division League, and J.C. Mukherjee T-20 Trophy.

==== Honours ====
- J. C. Mukherjee T-20 Championship
  - Runners-up (1): 2023

=== Volleyball ===
Calcutta Custom's volleyball section participates in the West Bengal State Senior Volleyball Championship.

=== Tennis ===
Lawn tennis as a racket sport is currently being practiced at the Calcutta Customs Club, as it is an affiliated member club of the Bengal Tennis Association (BTA).

== See also ==
- Football in Kolkata
- List of football clubs in India
