= Basic serving arrangement =

Telecommunications arrangement

In telecommunications, the term basic serving arrangement (BSA) has the following meanings:

1. The fundamental tariffed switching and transmission (and other) services that an operating company must provide to an enhanced service provider (ESP) to connect with its customers through the company network.
2. In an open-network-architecture context, the fundamental underlying connection of an enhanced service provider (ESP) to and through the operating company's network including an ESP access link, the features and functions associated with that access link at the central office serving the ESP and/or other offices, and the transport (dedicated or switched) within the network that completes the connection from the ESP to the central office serving its customers or to capabilities associated with the customer's complementary network services. Each component may have a number of categories of network characteristics. Within these categories of network characteristics are alternatives from among which the customer must choose. Examples of BSA components are ESP access link, transport and/or usage.
