= Food Corporation of India =

Indian statutory body

- Food Corporation of India

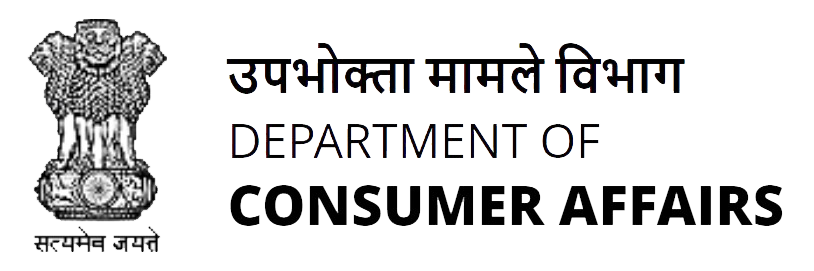
- Parent agency - Ministry of Consumer Affairs
- Type: Public sector company
- Industry: Food security
- Founded: 14 January 1965 (61 years ago)
- Founder: Government of India
- Headquarters: New Delhi, India
- Number of locations: 5 (Zonal Offices)
- Area served: Throughout India
- Key people: Ashutosh Agnihotri, IAS (Chairman & MD)
- Products: Food grains
- Services: Ensuring food security of India
- Owner: Ministry of Consumer Affairs, Food and Public Distribution, Government of India
- Number of employees: 21,847 (as on 31 March 2019)
- Website: fci.gov.in

The Food Corporation of India (FCI) is a Central Government agency under the Ministry of Consumer Affairs, Food and Public Distribution, formed by the enactment of Food Corporation Act, 1964 . Its top official is designated as Chairman and Managing Director, who is a central government civil servant of the IAS cadre. The corporation was set up in 1965 with its initial headquarters at Chennai. Later this was moved to New Delhi. It also has regional centers in state capitals.

== Mandate ==
The Food Corporation of India was set up on 14 January 1965 by the Government of India, having its first district office at Thanjavur, and headquarters at Chennai, under the Food Corporations Act 1964 to implement the National Food Policy's objectives.

== Statistics ==
The FCI is one of the largest corporations in India started by the government, and one of the largest supply chain management Corporation in Asia. It operates through five zonal and 26 regional offices. Each year, the Food Corporation of India purchases roughly 15 to 20 percent of India's wheat output and 12 to 15 percent of its rice output. The purchases are made from the farmers at the rates declared by the Government of India. This rate is called the MSP (minimum support price).

== Operations ==
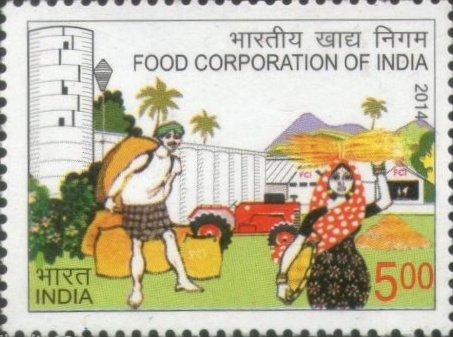
Stamp of India 2014 Food Corporation of India

Its silos are located at Hapur in Uttar Pradesh, Malur in Karnataka, and Elavur in Tamil Nadu.

== See also ==
- Food Corporation of India FC
