= Enhanced service =

Service used in interstate communications

Enhanced service is service offered over commercial carrier transmission facilities used in interstate communications, that employs computer processing applications that act on the format, content, code, protocol, or similar aspects of the subscriber's transmitted information; provides the subscriber with additional, different, or restructured information; or involves subscriber interaction with stored information.
