= Mohun Bagan Ground =

Football stadium in Kolkata, India

Mohun Bagan Ground মোহনবাগান গ্রাউন্ড
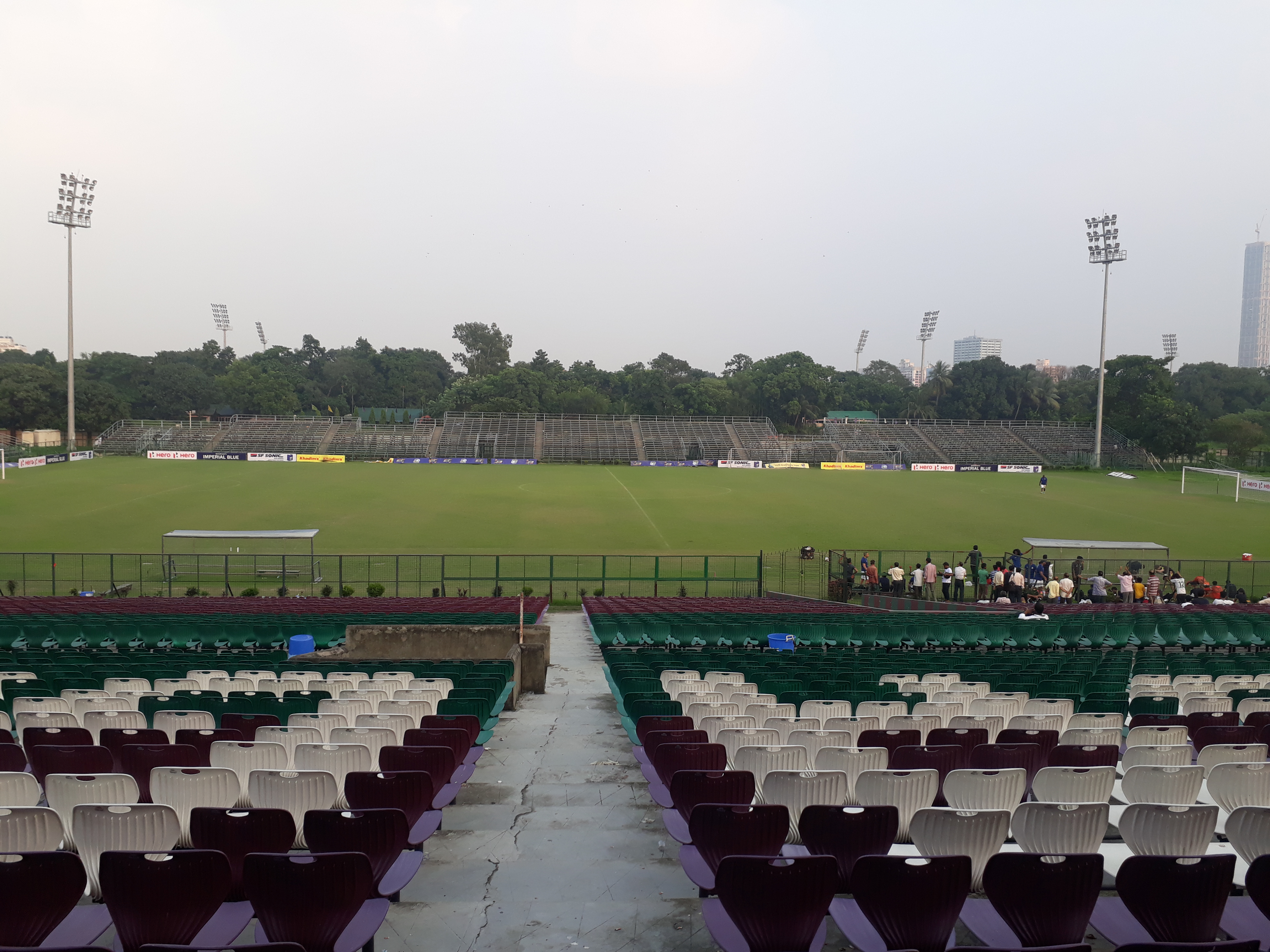
- Mohun Bagan Ground on a matchday
- Interactive map of Mohun Bagan Ground মোহনবাগান গ্রাউন্ড
- Former names: Calcutta FC Ground
- Location: Kolkata, India
- Coordinates: 22°33′43″N 88°20′32″E
- Owner: Eastern Command
- Operator: Indian Football Association
- Capacity: 2,500
- Surface: Grass
- Scoreboard: Yes (manual)
- Field size: 100 x 60 metres
- Public transit: Esplanade Bus Terminus; Eden Gardens; Esplanade

Construction
- Opened: 1872

Tenants
- Calcutta FC (1872–present); Mohun Bagan (1963–present)

Mohun Bagan Ground, also known as Mohun Bagan–Calcutta FC Ground, is a football stadium located in Maidan, Kolkata, just opposite Eden Gardens. Due to certain restrictions by the Indian Armed Forces, who own all the land surrounding Fort William, the ground is legally leased to Mohun Bagan for their operations. The ground is mostly used as training facilities for the senior football team of Mohun Bagan, but also acts as the home ground in regional tournaments like Calcutta Football League where reserve team participates. The stadium has a capacity of 22,000 spectators with separate VIP box and press box. The ground is also a shared home venue of Calcutta CFC, who were the earliest tenants of the ground.

== History ==
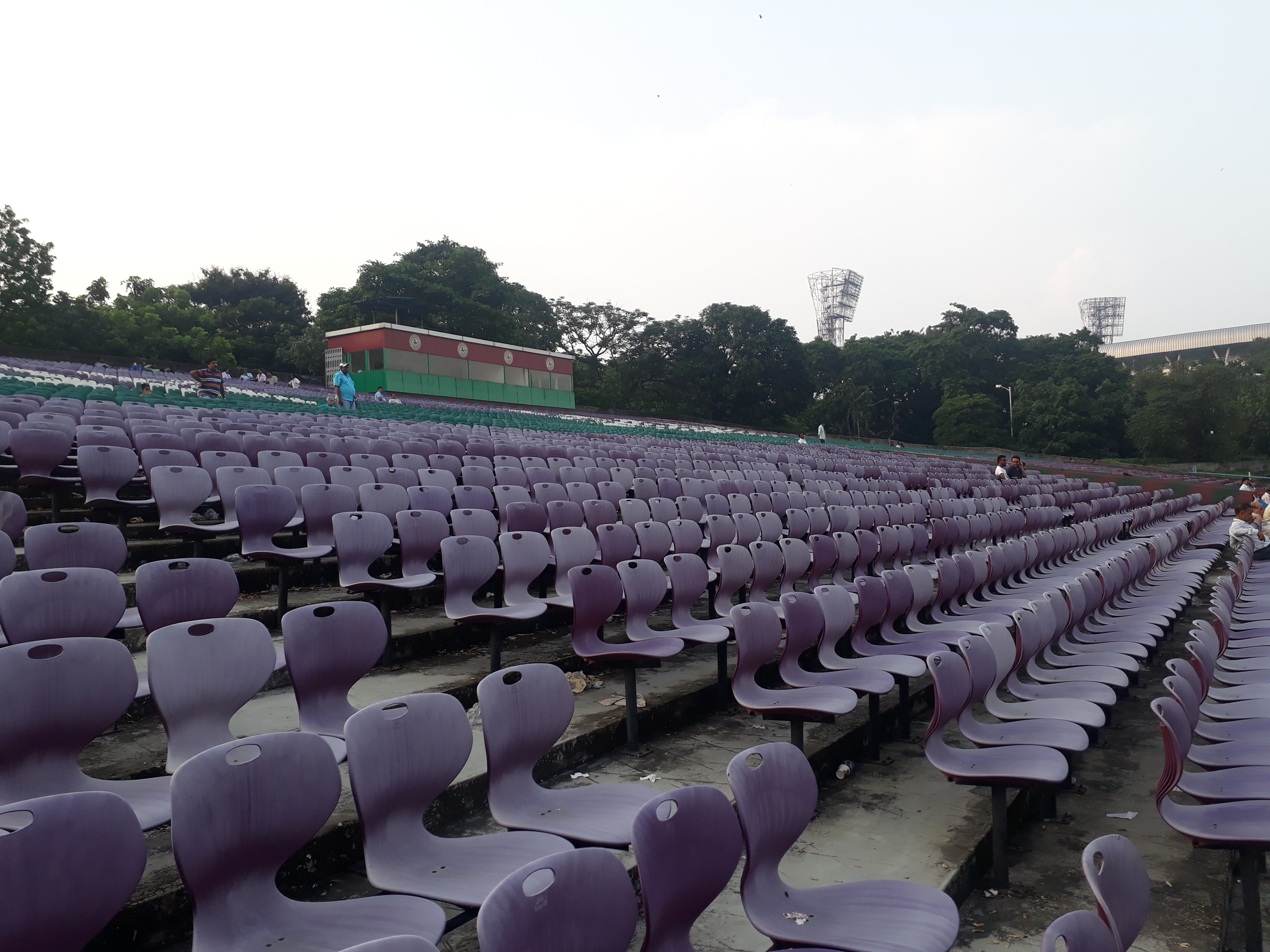
Mohun Bagan Club gallery

The first ground of the club was inside the famous marble palace, owned by Kirti Mitra of the Mitra family and known as Mohun Bagan Villa. It was situated in Fariapukur lane of north Kolkata. As a football ground however, this ground was not sufficiently large. It is believed that Mohun Bagan played the first match on this very ground against the students of Eden Hindu hostel. In 1891, with the help of the Maharaja of Shyampukur, Durga Charan Laha, the club ground was relocated to his ground in Shyampukur. That place is now known as Shyampukur Laha Colony. Later, with the help of Mr. Harry Lee, the chairman of Kolkata Municipal Corporation, the ground was again shifted to Shyam Square. The ground was shared with the Aryans and Bagbazar Club.

In 1900, Mohun Bagan became the partner of Presidency College and shared the same ground in Kolkata maidan. Mohun Bagan continued to play here for 15 years. Then in 1915, Mohun Bagan got the ground of National AC. On this ground, Mohun Bagan played till 1963. In 1915, the ground was expanded east–west, before becoming north–south stretched like the other grounds in Kolkata.

== About ==
The stadium has galleries on three sides and a rampart on the fourth side. The north side gallery is the member's gallery and is the most modern gallery of the stadium, having bucket seats installed. The east side and south side galleries are mainly made of steel & concrete structure and are designated for non-member supporters. The playing pitch is about 100m x 60m in dimension. Just adjacent the stadium, the club tent and main office are located. The club tent consists of a beautiful lawn, with benches known as the Mohun Bagan lawn.

In 1977, Mohun Bagan became the first club in maidan to have floodlights installed in their stadium. The floodlights operated till the mid-1990s, after which they became fully dysfunctional. The lights were later repaired and renovated and were inaugurated on 25 February 2016 with an IFA Shield match between Mohun Bagan U19s and DSK Liverpool academy.

For the 2015 ISL season, Kolkata-based club Atlético de Kolkata used the ground as a training ground. From the 2016–17 season, Mohun Bagan has decided to pitch for hosting I-League matches at their home club ground, especially with modern facilities like bucket seats and properly functional floodlight towers.

In July 2019, the interiors of the stadium were renovated for making the stadium well equipped to host I-League matches. The dressing room in particular was given a major upgrade.

In 2022, after the latest rebranding of football division after RPSG Group, the club renovated the stadium in the lines of Vivekananda Yuba Bharati Krirangan with artificial turf and upgraded amenities so that it can be used for their future home matches in Indian Super League and other big tournaments when required. Since then, the first match that the team played was a friendly fixture against Chennaiyin in August 2022. The ground is used in Durand Cup and is currently being used as the home ground of reserve team and training ground of senior team.

== Matches ==
The Mohun Bagan Ground hosted a lot of historic matches. It was witness to the 2–2 draw of Mohun Bagan against Ararat Yerevan in the 1978 IFA Shield final. The first ever match under floodlights in maidan was held in this ground when Mohun Bagan faced Pakhtakor Tashkent in an exhibition game on 10 February 1977. In the 1960s and 1970s majority of the matches in Kolkata football were held in the Mohun Bagan Ground.
