= Beighton Cup =

Field hockey tournament in India

All India Beighton Cup Hockey Tournament
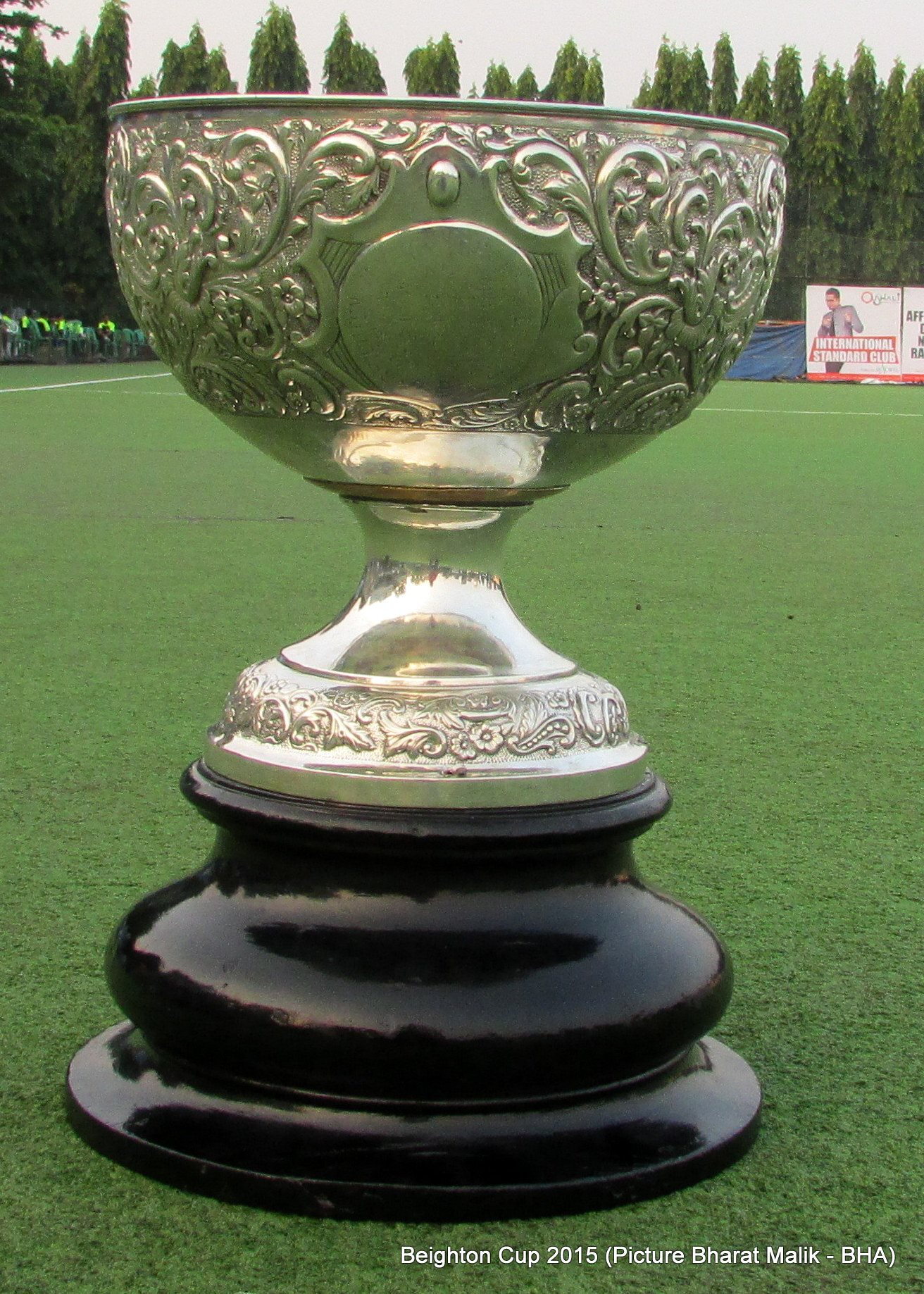
- The Beighton Cup trophy
- Sport: Field hockey
- Founded: 1895; 131 years ago
- Administrator: Hockey Bengal
- No. of teams: 20
- Country: India
- Headquarters: Kolkata
- Most recent champions: Indian Navy (2nd title)
- Most titles: Mohun Bagan (14 titles)
- Website: hockeybengal.org
- 2024

The Beighton Cup (also known as the Coal India Beighton Cup for sponsorship reasons) is a field hockey tournament organized by Hockey Bengal (formerly the Bengal Hockey Association). Instituted in 1895, it is one of the oldest field hockey tournaments in the world and is held every year in Kolkata.

== History ==
=== Aristocratic 19th century origins ===
Instituted in 1895, the tournament's origins are steeped in both the era of British colonialism and the English aristocracy. The tournament was named after its British donor, Judge Thomas Durant Beighton of the Indian Civil Service and Legal Remembrancer to the Government of Bengal. Born in 1846, Beighton died in Gibraltar of heart failure in February 1906.

Beighton had married for a second time in 1897 and in 1898 had a son, Thomas Percival Durant Beighton (aka T.P.D. Beighton, died 1971), who was, like his father, a keen sportsman, particularly at both Winchester College and Christ Church, Oxford University. He later published his accounts as a motoring enthusiast; a sport, like cricket, that he enjoyed with his brother-in-law, John Alfred Middleton, MC, whose wedding to T.P.D. Beighton's sister, Dorothea, in London at St Peter's Church, Eaton Square had featured on the front page of the Daily Mirror on 5 January 1922. T.P.D. Beighton and Middleton had been boarders together at Winchester and then enlisted during WWI following which they both entered Christ Church, Oxford as freshmen in 1919. T.P.D. Beighton's wife, Kathleen Muriel Beighton (née Hood), was the daughter of sports benefactor Sir Joseph Hood, 1st Baronet.

=== Recent decades ===
Today, the Beighton Cup hockey tournament is organised by Hockey Bengal, previously called the Bengal Hockey Association and used to be held on natural grass at the Mohun Bagan ground on the Maidan in Kolkata (earlier called Calcutta) in India. For last few years, it has been held on Astro Turf (artificial grass) at Sports Authority of India (SAI East) in Kolkata. The Beighton Cup was initially organized by the Indian Football Association, until the Bengal Hockey Association took over in 1905.

In the 1940s and 1950s, Bengal had strong teams in Kolkata such as Customs and Port Commissioners, and Bengal-Nagpur Railway in Kharagpur. It went on to win the 1952 national hockey championship held in Kolkata, defeating Punjab.

== Dhyan Chand remembers ==
In his autobiography Goal!, the legendary Dhyan Chand remembers his Beighton Cup debut. He says, "In my opinion it is perhaps the best organised hockey event in the country. Kolkata is indeed lucky that it has at least three or four first class hockey grounds on the maidan, and this is a great advantage to run a tournament on schedule. Instituted in 1895, this tournament has had a non-stop run. World Wars I and II did not affect the tournament. Threats of Japanese bombs and actual bombings in Kolkata while the hockey season was on also did not prevent the tournament from being held. That being said, it is sad to think that the tournament had to yield to the communal frenzy which gripped the nation in 1946–47."

== Hockey in Kolkata ==
Apart from the Beighton Cup, Kolkata had many firsts in hockey to its credit. The first hockey association in India was formed in 1908 — the Bengal Hockey Association. The first national hockey championship of India was held in 1928. It was called the inter-provincials, with 5 provinces of undivided India participating. The first Indian Olympic team for the Amsterdam Games was selected in Kolkata after the 1928 nationals.

Twenty-seven Olympic gold medals, two silver medals and one bronze medal ~ that is what Bengal's hockey can boast of. However, all that is history and Kolkata no longer has a hockey Olympian. Despite its pioneering role in the history of Indian hockey, Kolkata is the only major metropolis in India without an artificial turf. "How can you hope to produce international class players if you cannot give the players astroturf to play on?" asks Gurbux Singh, secretary of the Bengal Hockey Association. Leslie Claudius agreed that the absence of astroturf is responsible for this decline, but added: "Ours was a different era. We were successful, so the enthusiasm for the game was naturally high. How can you have that today? Even the educational institutions are not interested in hockey nowadays. But you can't blame them. Young people don't find hockey exciting enough. Maybe if we can give them astroturf, the fast surface can lure them back into the game."

== Big names ==
Leslie Claudius was the biggest name in Kolkata hockey; he played for Customs in Kolkata, and won 4 Olympic medals from 1948 to 1960 (3 gold, 1 silver).

== Results ==
The results of the Beighton Cup:

Year	Winner	Runner-up
1895	Calcutta Naval Volunteers AC	
1896	Calcutta Naval Volunteers AC	
1897	SPG Mission, Ranchi	
1898	SPG Mission, Ranchi	
1899	Calcutta Rangers Club	
1900	St. James School	
1901	1st Royal Irish Rifles	
1902	SPG Mission, Ranchi	
1903	SPG Mission, Ranchi	
1904	Hornets AC	
1905	BE College, Sibpore	
1906	SPG Mission, Ranchi	
1907	SPG Mission, Ranchi	
1908	Calcutta Customs	
1909	Calcutta Customs	
1910	Calcutta Customs	
1911	Calcutta Rangers Club	
1912	Calcutta Customs	
1913	Calcutta Rangers Club	
1914	MAO College, Aligarh	AFC, Jamalpur
1915	Calcutta Rangers Club	Calcutta Customs
1916	BY Association, Lucknow	Calcutta Customs
1917	Calcutta Rangers Club	Bactetors Union (Dakha)
1918	BY Association, Lucknow	East Indian Railway Asansol Rec. Club
1919	Xaverians' Club	Calcutta FC
1920	East Indian Railway Asansol Rec. Club	AFC, Jamalpur
1921	BE College, Sibpore	Calcutta Rangers Club
1922	EBR Sports Club	Calcutta Customs
1923	BY Association, Lucknow	Calcutta Customs
1924	Calcutta FC	AFC, Jamalpur
1925	Calcutta Customs	Xaverians' Club
1926	Calcutta Customs	Punjab HA
1927	Xaverians' Club	Calcutta Customs
1928	Telegraph Rec. Club	Calcutta Customs
1929	EIR Sports Club	Calcutta Customs
1930	Calcutta Customs	Port Commissioners
1931	Calcutta Customs	BN Railway
1932	Calcutta Customs	BN Railway
1933	Jhansi Heroes	Calcutta Customs
1934	Calcutta Rangers Club	EI Railway
1935	Calcutta Customs	BN Railway
1936	Bombay Customs	Calcutta Customs
1937	BN Railway	Bhopal Wanderers
1938	Calcutta Customs	BN Railway
1939	BN Railway	Calcutta Customs
1940	Bhopal Wanderers	Bhagawant Club, Tikamgarh
1941	Bhopal Wanderers and Bhagawant Club, Tikamgarh were declared joint winners	
1942	Calcutta Rangers Club	BN Railway
1943	BN Railway	Calcutta Rangers Club
1944	BN Railway	Jiwaji Club, Gwalior
1945	BN Railway	Mohammedan Sporting Club
1946	Port Commissioners	BN Railway
1947	Tournament not held	
1948	Port Commissioners and U.P. Selected XI were declared joint winners	
1949	Tata Sports Club, Bombay	Punjab Sports Club
1950	Tata Sports Club, Bombay	Lusitanians, Bombay
1951	Hindustan Aircraft, Bangalore	Bata Sports
1952	Mohun Bagan	Hindustan Aircraft, Bangalore
1953	Tata Sports Club, Bombay	Nagpur United
1954	Tata Sports Club, Bombay	Western Railways, Bombay
1955	Western Railway and U. P. XI were declared joint winners	
1956	Services	Mohun Bagan
1957	East Bengal	Mohammedan Sporting Club
1958	Mohun Bagan	Corps of Engineers, Kirkee
1959	Corps of Engineers, Kirkee	Army XI, New Delhi
1960	Mohun Bagan	Indian Navy
1961	Central Railway, Bombay	Punjab Police, Jalandhar
1962	East Bengal	Central Railway, Bombay
1963	Central Railway, Bombay	East Bengal
1964	East Bengal and Mohun Bagan were declared joint winners	
1965	Mohun Bagan and Calcutta Customs were declared joint winners	
1966	Punjab Police	Corps of Signals, Jalandhar
1967	East Bengal	Bhilai Steel Plant
1968	Mohun Bagan	Bengal Nagpur Railway
1969	Mohun Bagan and Winners Corps of Signal were declared joint winners	
1970	Western Railway, Bombay	East Bengal
1971	BSF Jalandhar and Mohun Bagan were declared joint winners	
1972	BSF, Jalandhar	Mohun Bagan
1973	I. H. F. Dark Blues and Mohun Bagan were declared joint winners	
1974	Mohun Bagan	Sikh Reg. Centre, Meerut
1975	Mohun Bagan	Sikh Reg. Centre, Meerut
1976	A. S. C. Jalandhar	C.R.P.F., Delhi
1977	Mohun Bagan	Western Railway, Bombay
1978	Mohun Bagan	CRPF, Delhi
1979	Mohun Bagan and A. S. C. Jalandhar were declared joint winners	
1980	Western Railway, Bombay	Mohun Bagan
1981	I. H. F. XI, East Zone	Mohammedan Sporting Club
1982	E. M. E. Jalandhar and Eastern Railway Ath. Asson were declared joint winners	
1983	E. M. E. Jalandhar	C.R.P.F., Neemuch
1984	Mecon Sports Club, Ranchi	A.S.C., Jalandhar
1985	Indian Airlines, Delhi	A.S.C., Jalandhar
1986	M. E. G., Bangalore	A.S.C., Jalandhar
1987	Bengal Nagpur Railway FC	East Bengal
1988	I.F.F. Co., Delhi	Southern Railway, Madras
1989	A. S.C., Jalandhar	Corps of Signals, Jalandhar
1990	E. M. E., Jalandhar	Corps of Signals, Jalandhar
1991	A. S.C., Jalandhar	E.M.E., Jalandhar
1992	Army XI, Jalandhar	A.S.C., Jalandhar
1993	Army XI, Jalandhar	S.A.G., Ranchi
1994	Army XI, Jalandhar	B. N. Railway
1995	Indian Railways	Indian Airlines
1996	B. S. F., Jalandhar	Tamil Nadu XI
1997	Punjab Police, Jalandhar	B.S.F., Jalandhar
1998	B. S. F., Jalandhar	Army XI, Jalandhar
1999	Punjab & Sind Bank, Jalandhar	A.S.C., Jalandhar
2000	Punjab & Sind Bank, Jalandhar	Tamil Nadu XI
2001	CISF, Chandigarh	Border Security Force, Jalandhar
2002	Punjab Police	CRPF
2003	Border Security Force, Jalandhar	Indian Oil Corporation
2004	Punjab & Sind Bank	Army XI
2005	Border Security Force, Jalandhar	Army XI
2006	Punjab & Sind Bank	Border Security Force, Jalandhar
2007	Indian Airlines	Border Security Force, Jalandhar
2008	Punjab Police and Punjab & Sind Bank were declared joint winners	
2009	Indian Oil Corporation	South Central Railway
2010	Air India	Coal India
2011	Indian Oil Corporation	ONGC
2012	Indian Oil Corporation	Punjab National Bank
2013	Army XI	ONGC
2014	Indian Oil Corporation	Punjab National Bank
2015	Punjab National Bank	Indian Oil Corporation
2016	Indian Oil Corporation	Bharat Petroleum
2017	Tournament not held	
2018	Indian Oil Corporation	Bharat Petroleum
2019	Indian Oil Corporation	Punjab National Bank
2020	Tournament not held	
2021	Tournament not held	
2022	Indian Navy	Punjab National Bank
2024	Indian Navy	Indian Oil Corporation

== Performance by teams ==
Team	Championships
Mohun Bagan	14
Calcutta Customs	12
Calcutta Rangers (inc. Calcutta Naval Volunteers AC)	9
Indian Oil Corporation	7
SPG Mission, Ranchi	6
Border Security Force, Jalandhar	6
BN Railway	6
Punjab & Sind Bank	5
East Bengal	4
Tata Sports Club, Bombay	4
Punjab Police	4
A. S. C. Jalandhar	4
Army XI, Jalandhar	4
BY Association, Lucknow	3
Western Railway, Bombay	3
E. M. E. Jalandhar	3
Indian Airlines, Delhi / Air India	3
BE College, Sibpore	2
Bhopal Wanderers	2
Port Commissioners	2
Xaverians' Club	2
U.P. XI	2
Central Railway, Bombay	2
I. H. F. Dark Blues / I. H. F. XI, East Zone	2
E. M. E. Jalandhar	2
Indian Navy	2
St. James School	1
1st Royal Irish Rifles	1
Hornets AC	1
MAO College, Aligarh	1
East Indian Railway Asansol Rec. Club	1
EBR Sports Club	1
Calcutta FC	1
Telegraph Rec. Club	1
EIR Sports Club	1
Jhansi Heroes	1
Bombay Customs	1
Bhagawant Club, Tikamgarh	1
Hindustan Aircraft, Bangalore	1
Services	1
Corps of Engineers, Kirkee	1
Winners Corps of Signal	1
Mecon Sports Club, Ranchi	1
M. E. G., Bangalore	1
I.F.F. Co., Delhi	1
Indian Railways	1
Central Industrial Security Force, Chandigarh	1
Punjab National Bank	1
