= Sukhwinder Singh (football manager) =

Indian footballer and manager

Personal information
- Date of birth: 7 June 1949 (age 77)
- Place of birth: Fatehpur Khurd, Hoshiarpur, Punjab, India
- Position: Defender

Senior career*
| Years | Team | Apps | (Gls) |
| 1971–1973 | JCT | | |
| 1971–1981 | Punjab Police | | |
| 1974–1978 | BSF | | |
| 1978–1985 | JCT | | |

International career
| 1975–1977 | India | | |

Managerial career
- 1995–2001: JCT
- 1999–2001: India
- 2002–2011: Pailan Arrows
- 2005: India
- 2007–2011: JCT
- 2011–2012: India U23
- 2011–2012: Churchill Brothers
- * Club domestic league appearances and goals

Sukhwinder Singh is an Indian football manager and a former international footballer. He was the coach of the India U-23 side and formerly of the Pailan Arrows of the I-League.

After completing his coaching course from National Institute of Sports in Patiala, Singh was appointed chief coach of JCT on 1 July 1992. He also served as deputy general manager and joint secretary of the Phagwara-based club. In 2020, Singh became the third Indian footballer to receive Major Dhyan Chand Award.

== Playing career ==
In club football, Singh appeared with various Punjabi teams, and represented Punjab Police at the 1971 edition of Asian Club Championship. In preliminary round (group allocation matches), they played against 1969–70 Kuwaiti Premier League champions Al-Arabi on 22 March 1971, and lost 1–8. After being placed in Group B, they suffered defeats in all three games, 2–0 to Bangkok Bank, 4–1 to Maccabi Tel Aviv, and 6–1 to Aliyat Al-Shorta. He scored a goal in that tournament.

Singh later represented Punjab at the Santosh Trophy and won first title in 1974–75 season, when the team was managed by Jarnail Singh. They finished the tournament having scored 46 goals.

== Managerial career ==
Singh managed the Indian senior team from 1999 to 2001 alongside managing JCT FC from 1995 to 2001. He joined JCT as head coach during the managership of Inder Singh. The club at that time became one of the most successful clubs in the country, winning Federation Cup twice in 1995 and 1996, inaugural National Football League in 1996–97, IFA Shield in 1996. He also guided them in continental tournament at the 1996–97 and reached second round.

His notable achievements include the SAFF Cup 1999 win with the Indian senior team, the SAFF Cup 2009 with the India U-23 team and the 1996–97 National Football League victory with JCT FC. He last managed I-League side Churchill Brothers.

Sukhwinder Singh is best remembered for India's performance in 2002 World Cup Qualifiers, where they defeated teams like United Arab Emirates, Brunei and Yemen. India secured 11 points from 6 matches, same as Yemen, but finished behind them due to an inferior goal difference. Only UAE qualified for the second round.

India started the campaign with solitary goal (by Jules Alberto) win over the mighty UAE at Bangalore. The men in blue defeated Brunei twice, one of which was a lopsided 5–0 win at home. They successfully held Yemen to draws in both the matches. They lost only one game in the entire qualifying phase, against the UAE in an away encounter.

In July 2000, Sukhwinder Singh managed India during their historic England-tour, where they played three matches against English Premier League sides Fulham, West Bromwich Albion, and arch-rival Bangladesh.

Singh later went on to manage Pailan Arrows, and also became technical director of the club. He guided the team in 2011 Indian Federation Cup, in which they finished second in group stages behind Salgaocar. In February 2012, he parted ways with the club.

In July 2018, then defending champions of I-League – Minerva Punjab roped in Singh as club's technical director. He was replaced by Northern Irish manager Paul Munster for the post in August.

== Personal life ==
Singh immigrated to Canada in 2021 to live with his son, who had already been settled there. He has many other relatives in Canada, including Indo-Canadian businessman Garry Sangha.

== Honours ==
=== Player ===
India

- Afghanistan Republic Day Cup third place: 1976, 1977
- King's Cup third place: 1977

Punjab

- Santosh Trophy: 1974–75, 1980–81

=== Manager ===
JCT

- National Football League: 1996–97
- Punjab State Super Football League: 1995; runners-up: 1999
- Federation Cup: 1995, 1996
- Durand Cup: 1996
- IFA Shield: 1996
- Rovers Cup: 1997
- Indian Super Cup runner-up: 1997
- Gurdarshan Memorial Cup: 1995, 2001
- Sait Nagjee Football Tournament: 1995
- Scissors Cup: 1995
- Shaheed-e-Azam Sardar Bhagat Singh Memorial Trophy runner-up: 1998

India

- SAFF Championship: 1999

India U23

- SAFF Championship: 2009

Awards and accolades

- Dhyan Chand Award: 2020

== See also ==
- History of the India national football team
- List of India national football team managers
