= Surjit =

Surjit is an Indian given name and may refer to:

- Surjit Bindrakhia (1962–2003), Indian singer and musician of Bhangra music
- Surjit Kaur Barnala, Sikh politician from Punjab, India
- Surjit Khan (born 1972), British-Indian record producer, musician and singer-songwriter
- Surjit Paatar (1945–2024), Indian poet
- Surjit Singh Barnala (1925–2017), Indian politician, former Chief Minister of Punjab
- Surjit Singh Rakhra, Indian politician, and Minister for Rural Development and Panchayat in the Punjab Government
- Surjit Singh Randhawa (1951–1984), former captain of the Indian field hockey team
  - Surjit Hockey Society
  - Surjit Hockey Stadium, Jalandhar, Punja, India
  - Surjit Memorial Hockey Tournament, hockey tournament in India
- Surjit Singh Sandhawalia (1925–2007), judge and former governor of Punjab, India
- Surjit Singh Sethi (1928–1995), Indian playwright, novelist, short story writer, lyricist, filmmaker and theatre personality
- Harkishan Singh Surjeet (1916–2008), Indian politician, leader of the Communist Party of India (Marxist)
