= 2016 Punjab State Super Football League =

Punjab State Super Football League
- Season: 2016
- Champions: Rail Coach Factory

The 2016 Punjab State Super Football League was the 30th season of the Punjab State Super Football League. The season began on 11 September 2016 and concluded on 19 October 2016.

The first match took place between Jangpur and Punjab Police. The match ended 2–2.

== Teams ==
- Border Security Force (Jalandhar)
- Central Reserve Police Force (Jalandhar)
- Dailbir FA (Patiala)
- Doaba
- Gurur (Jalandhar)
- Jagat Singh Palahi
- Jangpur
- Punjab Police (Jalandhar)
- Punjab State Power Corporation Limited (Hoshiarpur)
- Rail Coach Factory (Kapurthala)
- Satluj

== Table ==
Pos	Team	Pld	W	D	L	GF	GA	GD	Pts	Qualification or relegation
1	Rail Coach Factory	10	7	3	0	21	7	+14	24	Champions
2	Punjab Police	10	6	4	0	16	7	+9	22	
3	Jangpur	10	5	4	1	17	8	+9	19	
4	Dailbir	10	5	2	3	18	9	+9	17	
5	Doaba	10	4	3	3	13	10	+3	15	
6	Central Reserve Police Reserve	10	3	5	2	14	11	+3	14	
7	Border Security Force	10	4	2	4	10	10	0	14	
8	Gurur	10	2	4	4	6	13	−7	10	
9	Punjab State Power Corporation Limited	10	1	3	6	4	13	−9	6	
10	Satlug	10	1	2	7	11	19	−8	5	
11	Jagat Singh Palahi	10	0	2	8	7	30	−23	2	

Updated to match(es) played on 19 October 2016. Source: The Indian League
Rules for classification: 1) Points; 2) Goal difference; 3) Goals scored;
