= Surjit Singh (footballer) =

Indian footballer

Personal information
- Date of birth: 3 April 1989 (age 37)
- Place of birth: India
- Position: Defender

Team information
- Current team: Salgaocar F.C.
- Number: 16

Senior career*
Years	Team	Apps	(Gls)
1998–2005	JCT Club		
2003–2004	Mohammedan S.C. (loan)		
2006–2011	Border Security Force		
2012–2013	Mohun Bagan		
2013–2014	Salgaocar		
- * Club domestic league appearances and goals

Surjit Singh (born 3 April 1989) is an Indian professional footballer who plays as a defender for Salgaocar F.C.

== Career ==
He played also for JCT FC and during the 2003/2004 Season on loan by Mohammedan S.C. He then returned in June 2004 from Mohammedan to JCT FC. Singh played a year after his return with JCT and moved in Summer 2006 to Punjab State Super League side Border Security Force. After five years left the Punjab State Super League club Border Security Force and signed for Mohun Bagan A.C.

=== Salgaocar ===
Singh made his professional debut for Salgaocar in the I-League on 19 October 2013 against Mumbai at the Balewadi Sports Complex; in which he came on as a substitute for Rahul Kumar in the 80th minute; as Salgaocar won the match 1–3.

== Career statistics ==
As of 19 October 2013

Club	Season	League			Federation Cup		Durand Cup		AFC		Total		
Club	Season	Apps	Goals	Apps	Goals	Apps	Goals	Apps	Goals	Apps	Goals		
Salgaocar	2013-14	1	0	0	0	0	0	0	0	1	0		
Salgaocar	Career total			1	0	0	0	0	0	0	0	1	0

== Honour ==
India U20 (Goa India)

- Lusofonia Games Gold medal: 2014
