= Gurdev Singh =

Gurdev Singh may refer to:

- Gurdev Singh (field hockey) (1933–2024), Indian field hockey player
- Gurdev Singh (musician) (born 1948), Indian-born musician based in London
- Gurdev Singh (footballer) (born 1950), former Indian footballer

== See also ==
- Gurdev Singh Gill (disambiguation)
