= Surjeet Singh =

Surjeet Singh or Surjit Singh may refer to:

- Surjeet Singh Deol, Indian field hockey player
- Surjeet Singh Deswal, Indian police officer
- Surjeet Singh Narwal, Indian kabaddi player
- Surjeet Singh Panesar, Kenyan field hockey player
- Surjit Singh Rihal, Kenyan field hockey player
- Surjit Singh Randhawa, Indian field hockey player
- Surjit Singh (footballer)
- Surjit Singh Barnala, Indian politician
- Surjit Singh Chhokar, English murder victim
- Surjit Singh Dhiman, Indian politician
- Surjit Singh Majithia, Indian politician
- Akali Surjit Singh
- Surjit Singh Rakhra, Indian politician
- Surjit Singh Sandhawalia, Indian jurist
- Surjit Singh Sethi, Indian writer
- Sujitsingh Thakur, Indian politician
