= 2021–22 Punjab State Super Football League =

Punjab State Super Football League
- Season: 2021–22
- Champions: BSF

The 2021-22 Punjab State Super Football League was the 35th season of the Punjab State Super Football League, the top-tier football league in the Indian state of Punjab. Punjab Police are the defending champions. The league commenced from 21 September 2021.

== Teams ==
A total number of 11 teams participated in the league.

Club	City/Town
FC Punjab Police	Jalandhar
CRPF FC	Jalandhar
Dalbir FC	Patiala
BSF FC	
Jagat Singh Palahi FA	
RoundGlass Punjab FC	
Sant Baba Bhag Singh FA	
SGHS FA	
Khalsa Warriors FC	Chandigarh
Principal Harbhajan FC	Jalandhar
Sikh Regiment Center FC	Jalandhar

== Standings ==
Pos	Team	Pld	W	D	L	GF	GA	GD	Pts	Qualification
1	BSF FC	10	7	3	0	16	3	+13	24	Champions
2	Jagat Singh Palahi FA	10	5	3	2	16	10	+6	18	Possible qualification for 2023–24 I-League 2
3	Sri Guru Hargobind Sahib FA	10	5	3	2	12	8	+4	18	Possible qualification for 2023–24 I-League 2
4	Punjab Police	10	5	3	2	11	7	+4	18	
5	CRPF	10	5	1	4	13	9	+4	16	
6	RoundGlass Punjab B	10	3	3	4	17	21	−4	12	
7	Khalsa Warriors FC	10	2	5	3	11	12	−1	11	
8	Principal Harbhajan SA	10	3	2	5	8	12	−4	11	
9	Sant Baba Bhag Singh FA	10	1	5	4	8	12	−4	8	
10	Sikh Regiment Centre FC	10	0	7	3	10	16	−6	7	
11	Dalbir FC	10	0	3	7	6	18	−12	3	Relegation to Punjab 2nd Division

Source: GSFA
Rules for classification: 1) points; 2) head-to-head points; 3) head-to-head goal difference; 4) head-to-head goals scored; 5) goal difference; 6) number of goals scored; 7) fair play ranking; 8) drawing of lots

== See also ==
- 2021–22 season in state football leagues of India
  - 2021–22 FD Senior Division
  - 2022 Himachal Football League
