= Surjit Singhwala =

- Village
- Country: India
- State: Punjab
- District: Gurdaspur
- Tehsil: Batala
- Region: Majha

Government
  - Type: Panchayat raj
  - Body: Gram panchayat

Area
  - Total: 51 ha (130 acres)

Population (2011)
  - Total: 573; 299/274 ♂/♀
  - Scheduled Castes: 98; 51/47 ♂/♀
  - Total Households: 126

Languages
  - Official: Punjabi
- Time zone: UTC+5:30 (IST)
- Telephone: 01871
- ISO 3166 code: IN-PB
- Vehicle registration: PB-18
- Website: gurdaspur.nic.in

Surjit Singhwala is a village in Batala in Gurdaspur district of Punjab, India. It is located 5 kilometres (3.1 mi) from sub district headquarter, 30 kilometres (19 mi) from district headquarter and 4 kilometres (2.5 mi) from Sri Hargobindpur. The village is named after hockey player Surjit Singh Randhawa.

== Demographics ==
As of 2011, the village has a total number of 126 houses and a population of 573 of which 299 are males while 274 are females. According to the report published by Census India in 2011, out of the total population of the village 98 people are from Schedule Caste and the village does not have any Schedule Tribe population so far.

== See also ==
- List of villages in India
