= 2019 Punjab State Super Football League =

Punjab State Super Football League
- Season: 2019
- Champions: Minerva Punjab FC
- Matches: 43
- Goals: 105 (2.44 per match)
- All statistics correct as of 20 October 2019.

The 2019 Punjab State Super Football League is the 33rd season of the Punjab State Super Football League, the top-tier football league in the Indian state of Punjab. Minerva Punjab FC are the defending champions. The league commenced from 8 August 2019.

== Round dates ==
The 33rd season of the Punjab State Super Football League consists of Phase 1, Phase 2 and Final Phase. The schedule will be as follows.

Round	Match dates	Number of teams	Qualification
Phase 1	8–20 August 2019	12 teams (4 groups)	Top 2 teams advance to phase 2
Phase 2 (qualifying round)	22–26 August 2019	8 teams (2 groups)	Top 2 teams advance to final phase joining 6 teams
Final phase	28 August 2019 – 11 October 2019	10 teams (2 Groups)	Top 4 teams advance to semi-finals
Semi-finals	17 - 18 October 2019	4	
Final	20 October 2019	2	

== Teams ==
Phase 1 teams :

- Doaba Football Club
- Guru Football Club
- JCT Academy
- Jagat Singh Palahi FA
- Khalsa Warriors FC
- Olympian Jarnail FA
- Principal Harbhajan SC
- SGHS Football Academy
- Sikh Regiment Centre FC
- United FC
- United Punjab FC
- Young Football Club

Final phase teams :

- BSF, Jalandhar
- CRPF, Jalandhar
- Dalbir Football Club
- Kehar Sporting Club
- Minerva Punjab FC
- Punjab Police, Jalandhar

== Phase 1 ==
=== Group A ===
Pos	Team	Pld	W	D	L	GF	GA	GD	Pts	Qualification
1	Guru Football Club	2	2	0	0	6	1	+5	6	Advance to phase 2 (qualification round)
2	Principal Harbhajan SC	2	1	0	1	3	3	0	3	Advance to phase 2 (qualification round)
3	United Punjab FC	2	0	0	2	0	5	−5	0	

Rules for classification: 1) points; 2) goal difference; 3) goals scored; 4) head-to-head result.

=== Group B ===
Pos	Team	Pld	W	D	L	GF	GA	GD	Pts	Qualification
1	JCT Academy	2	1	1	0	4	3	+1	4	Advance to phase 2 (qualification round)
2	Young Football Club	2	1	1	0	3	2	+1	4	Advance to phase 2 (qualification round)
3	United FC	2	0	0	2	2	5	−3	0	

Rules for classification: 1) points; 2) goal difference; 3) goals scored; 4) head-to-head result.

=== Group C ===
Pos	Team	Pld	W	D	L	GF	GA	GD	Pts	Qualification
1	Olympian Jarnail FA	2	1	0	1	4	3	+1	3	Advance to phase 2 (qualification round)
2	Khalsa Warriors FC	2	1	0	1	3	3	0	3	Advance to phase 2 (qualification round)
3	Doaba Football Club	2	1	0	1	2	3	−1	3	

Rules for classification: 1) points; 2) goal difference; 3) goals scored; 4) head-to-head result.

=== Group D ===
Pos	Team	Pld	W	D	L	GF	GA	GD	Pts	Qualification
1	SGHS Football Academy	2	1	1	0	3	2	+1	4	Advance to phase 2 (qualification round)
2	Sikh Regiment Centre FC	2	1	0	1	2	2	0	3	Advance to phase 2 (qualification round)
3	Jagat Singh Palahi FA	2	0	1	1	1	2	−1	1	

Rules for classification: 1) points; 2) goal difference; 3) goals scored; 4) head-to-head result.

== Phase 2 (qualification round) ==
=== Group A ===
Pos	Team	Pld	W	D	L	GF	GA	GD	Pts	Qualification
1	Khalsa Warriors FC	2	1	1	0	2	1	+1	4	Advance to Final Phase
2	Guru Football Club	2	1	1	0	1	0	+1	4	Advance to Final Phase
3	Principal Harbhajan SC	2	1	0	1	2	2	0	3	
4	Olympian Jarnail FA	2	0	0	2	0	2	−2	0	

Rules for classification: 1) points; 2) goal difference; 3) goals scored; 4) head-to-head result.

=== Group B ===
Pos	Team	Pld	W	D	L	GF	GA	GD	Pts	Qualification
1	Sikh Regiment Centre FC	2	1	0	1	3	1	+2	3	Advance to Final Phase
2	SGHS Football Academy	2	1	0	1	2	1	+1	3	Advance to Final Phase
3	Young Football Club	2	1	0	1	1	2	−1	3	
4	JCT Academy	2	1	0	1	1	3	−2	3	

Rules for classification: 1) points; 2) goal difference; 3) goals scored; 4) head-to-head result.

== Final phase ==
=== Group A ===
Pos	Team	Pld	W	D	L	GF	GA	GD	Pts	Qualification
1	Minerva Punjab	4	4	0	0	11	1	+10	12	Advance to Semi-finals
2	Kehar Sporting Club	4	2	1	1	6	7	−1	7	Advance to Semi-finals
3	BSF	4	1	2	1	7	5	+2	5	
4	Guru Football Club	4	1	1	2	3	3	0	4	
5	Khalsa Warriors FC	4	0	0	4	2	13	−11	0	

Rules for classification: 1) points; 2) goal difference; 3) goals scored; 4) head-to-head result.

28 August 2019	BSF	0-4	Minerva Punjab	Jalandhar
				Stadium: BSF Stadium

1 September 2019	Guru Football Club	0-0	BSF	Jalandhar
				Stadium: Lyallpur Khalsa College Ground

3 September 2019	Kehar Sporting Club	3–1	Khalsa Warriors FC	Jalandhar
				Stadium: DAV College Ground

15 September 2019	Minerva Punjab	5-1	Kehar Sporting Club	Mohali
				Stadium: Doan

15 September 2019	Khalsa Warriors FC	1–3	Guru Football Club	Kharar, SAS Nagar
				Stadium: MC Stadium

6 October 2019	BSF	1-1	Kehar Sporting Club	Jalandhar
4:00 PM				Stadium: DAV College Ground

6 October 2019	Guru Football Club	0-1	Minerva Punjab	Jalandhar
4:00 PM				Stadium: Lyallpur Khalsa College Ground

9 October 2019	Khalsa Warriors FC	0-6	BSF	Kharar, SAS Nagar
4:00 PM				Stadium: MC Stadium

10 October 2019	Kehar Sporting Club	1-0	Guru Football Club	Jalandhar
4:00 PM				Stadium: DAV College Ground

11 October 2019	Minerva Punjab	1-0	Khalsa Warriors FC	Mohali
4:00 PM				Stadium: Doan

=== Group B ===
Pos	Team	Pld	W	D	L	GF	GA	GD	Pts	Qualification
1	Punjab Police	4	1	3	0	6	4	+2	6	Advance to Semi-finals)
2	Dalbir Football Club	4	1	3	0	5	4	+1	6	Advance to Semi-finals)
3	SGHS Football Academy	4	1	2	1	5	5	0	5	
4	Sikh Regiment Centre FC	4	1	2	1	4	4	0	5	
5	CRPF	4	0	2	2	3	6	−3	2	

Rules for classification: 1) points; 2) goal difference; 3) goals scored; 4) head-to-head result.

29 August 2019	Punjab Police	2-2	CRPF	Jalandhar
				Stadium: PAP Ground

31 August 2019	Sikh Regiment Centre FC	2-2	Dalbir Football Club	Jalandhar
				Stadium: Lyallpur Khalsa College Ground

2 September 2019	CRPF	0-2	SGHS Football Academy	Jalandhar
				Stadium: CRPF Ground

3 September 2019	Dalbir Football Club	0-0	Punjab Police	Patiala
				Stadium: Punjabi University

14 September 2019	SGHS Football Academy	0-2	Sikh Regiment Centre FC	Banga, India
				Stadium: SN College Ground

4 October 2019	Punjab Police	2-2	SGHS Football Academy	Jalandhar
4:00 PM				Stadium: PAP Ground

5 October 2019	Dalbir Football Club	2-1	CRPF	Patiala
4:00 PM				Stadium: Punjabi University

9 October 2019	CRPF	0-0	Sikh Regiment Centre FC	Jalandhar
4:00 PM				Stadium: CRPF Ground

9 October 2019	SGHS Football Academy	1-1	Dalbir Football Club	Banga, India
4:00 PM				Stadium: SN College Ground

11 October 2019	Sikh Regiment Centre FC	0-2	Punjab Police	Jalandhar
4:00 PM				Stadium: Lyallpur Khalsa College Ground

== Semi-finals ==
17 October 2019	Punjab Police	3-0	Kehar SC	Ludhiana
				Stadium: Kartar Singh Sarabha Stadium

18 October 2019	Minerva Punjab	1-0	Dalbir Football Club	Ludhiana
				Stadium: Kartar Singh Sarabha Stadium

== Final ==
20 October 2019	Punjab Police	2–2 (a.e.t.) (6–7 p)	Minerva Punjab	Ludhiana
				Stadium: Kartar Singh Sarabha Stadium
