= DCM Trophy =

Invitational football tournament in India

- Organiser(s): Delhi Cloth Mills Group
- Founded: 1945; 81 years ago
- Abolished: 1997; 29 years ago
- Region: India
- Teams: various
- Last champions: Mohun Bagan (1st title)
- Most championships: East Bengal (7 titles)

The Delhi Cloth Mills Trophy, commonly known as D.C.M. Trophy, was an invitational football tournament in India. It was held annually in New Delhi and was organised by the Delhi Cloth Mills tournament committee. It was India's first football tournament to provide the national clubs with international exposure due to participation of international clubs from Asia and Europe.

== History ==
The tournament was established in 1945 by Bharat Ram and Charat Ram of the Delhi Cloth & General Mills textile conglomerate.

Delhi's local teams won the first two editions; since then, clubs from Calcutta have dominated the 1950s and early 1960s, and foreign clubs since the late 1960s. The tournament has not been organised since 1997 due to fixture congestion and various restructuring policies in Indian club football. Mohun Bagan was the last winner of the tournament.

== Results ==
Year	Winners	Score	Runners-up	Notes
1945	New Delhi Heroes	3–2	(United Kingdom) King's Own Yorkshire Light Infantry	
1946–48	The tournament was not held			
1949	Raisina Sporting Union (Delhi)	1–1, 3–1	City Club (Lucknow)	
1950	East Bengal	2–0	8th Gorkha Rifles (Dehradun)	
1951	Rajasthan Club (Calcutta)	3–0	8th Gorkha Rifles (Dehradun)	
1952	East Bengal	4–0	8th Gorkha Rifles (Dehradun)	
1953	Aryan Gymkhana (Bangalore)	3–2	East Indian Railway Accounts (Calcutta)	
1954	Geological Survey (Calcutta)	1–0	Hyderabad FA	
1955	Indian Air Force Station (Delhi)	2–0	District Sports Association (Allahabad)	
1956	Indian Air Force	0–0, 0–0, 1–0	East Bengal	
1957	East Bengal	0–0, 2–0	Eastern Railway	
1958	Mohammedan Sporting	1–0	East Bengal	
1959	Hyderabad Central Police	1–0	Madras Engineer Group	
1960	East Bengal	3–1	Mohammedan Sporting	
1961	Mohammedan Sporting	2–1	Madras Regimental Centre	
1962	Madras Regimental Centre	1–0	Mafatlal Group (Bombay)	
1963	E.M.E. Centre	1–1, 3–1	Punjab Police	
1964	Mohammedan Sporting	1–1, 1–0	Andhra Pradesh Police	
1965	Andhra Pradesh Police	2–0	Central Police Lines (Hyderabad)	
1966	Punjab Police	0–0, 2–0	Leader FC (Jalandhar)	
1967	Mafatlal Group (Bombay)	5–0	Leader FC (Jalandhar)	
1968	Mafatlal Group (Bombay)	2–1	Leader FC (Jalandhar)	
1969	(Iran) Taj Tehran	4–0	South Central Railway (Secunderabad)	
1970	(Iran) Taj Tehran	3–1	Andhra Pradesh Police	
1971	(Iran) Taj Tehran	1–0	Leader FC (Jalandhar)	
1972	(North Korea) April 25	1–1	(West Germany) Bayerischer F.V.	^{1}
1973	East Bengal	0–0, 0–0	(North Korea) Dok Ro Gang	^{2}
1974	East Bengal	1–0	Punjab Police	
1975	(South Korea) Hanyang University	2–0	East Bengal	
1976	(South Korea) Hanyang University and Border Security Force (joint winners) – 0–0, 0–0			^{3}
1977	(Soviet Union) Spartak United	3–0	JCT	
1978	(Soviet Union) Volga Kalinin	1–0	(West Germany) Bayerischer F.V.	
1979	Border Security Force and (South Korea) Citizens' National Bank (joint winners) – 1–1, 1–1			^{4}
1980	Mohammedan Sporting	1–0	(South Korea) Bank of Seoul & Trust Company	
1981	(South Korea) Myongji University	3–1	(Australia) East Fremantle Tricolore	
1982–83	(South Korea) Incheon University	0–0, 3–0	Mohammedan Sporting	
1983	East Bengal	1–0	Mohammedan Sporting	^{5}
1984	(China) Liaoning	1–0	Western Australia Soccer Federation	
1985	Football Fed. of South Australia	0–0 (5–4 p)	East Bengal	
1986	(Soviet Union) Metalist Kharkiv	4–0	East Bengal	
1987	(South Korea) S.M. Industry Bank	1–0	JCT	
1988	(South Korea) POSCO Atoms	1–0	East Bengal	
1989	(Iran) Esteghlal	3–1	(South Korea) POSCO Atoms	
1990	(South Korea) Kyung Hee University	0–0 (5–4 p)	Kerala Police	
1991	(Iran) PAS Tehran	1–0	Mohun Bagan	
1992–93	(South Korea) Incheon University	1–1 (4–1 p)	East Bengal	
1993	(Croatia) NK Varteks	3–0	JCT	
1994–95	(Iran) Bahman	2–0	Mohun Bagan	
1995–96	(Iran) Tractor Sazi	3–0	Punjab State Electricity Board	
1996	The tournament was not held			
1997	Mohun Bagan	2–0	Tata Football Academy	

Notes:

1. Bayerischer withdrew from the replay, so April 25 were declared winners
2. East Bengal were declared winners as Dok Ro Gang refused to play extra time
3. Joint winners after replay
4. Joint winners after replay
5. Abandoned in the 83rd minute due to a riot
