= Hot Weather Football Championship =

- Organiser(s): All India Hot Weather Football Championship Organising Committee
- Founded: 1972; 54 years ago (current format)
- Region: India
- Teams: Various
- Current champions: Morning Star, Haryana
- Most championships: FC Punjab Police (4 titles)

Hot Weather Football Championship, also known as the All India Hot Weather Football Championship, is an Indian football tournament held in Mandi, Himachal Pradesh and organized by the All India Hot Weather Football Championship Organising Committee (AIHWFCOC). The tournament was first started in 1970, which was won by Sports School Jalandhar. FC Punjab Police has won the tournament for a record four times. The current champions are Morning Star, Haryana who won the title by defeating Zinc Football at the 50th edition of the tournament in 2022.

== Venue ==
All matches are played at Paddal Ground of Mandi Himachal Pradesh.

== Results ==
List of Hot Weather Football Championship finals
Year	Champions	Score	Runners-up	Ref.
1972	Sports School Jalandhar			
1997	Punjab State Electricity Board		Punjab Police	
1998	Punjab Police	2–1	Punjab State Electricity Board	
1999	Punjab Police		Rail Coach Factory	
2000	Tournament not held			
2001	Oriental Bank of Commerce	(3–1 p)	LRED Bangalore	
2002	Punjab Police			
2003	Punjab Police	5–1	Punjab Police Academy	
2004	Hydrabad Globe FC	1–0	Tata Football Academy	
2005	Tournament not held			
2006	Amity United	2–0	Hydrabad Globe FC	
2007	Hydrabad Globe FC	1–1, (4–3 p)	ONGC	
2014	BSF	0–0, (3–2 p)	DFA Hoshiarpur	
2017	Triumph FC, Mandi			
2018	Union Bank of India	2–0	Reserve Bank of India	
2019	Sudeva Delhi	1–0	Punjab Police	
2021	Reserve Bank of India, Mumbai	1–1, (5–3 p)	Tamil Nadu Police	
2022	Morning Star Haryana	2–1	Zinc Football	
2024	Rajasthan Police	3–1	Triumph FC, Mandi	
