= 2011 I-League U19 =

- Champions: JCT
- Goals scored: 90
- Average goals/game: 3.3
- Biggest home win: Dempo 6–1 Salgaocar (Group stage)
- Biggest away win: Sporting Clube de Goa 2–6 Dempo (Group stage)
- Highest scoring: Sporting Clube de Goa 2–6 Dempo (Group stage); Mumbai 6–2 ONGC (Group stage)
- Longest winning run: East Bengal (5 games)
- Longest unbeaten run: East Bengal (5 games)
- Longest losing run: Salgaocar; ONGC; Viva Kerala; Churchill Brothers (3 games)

The 2011 I-League U19 was the third edition of the I-League U19.

All teams played the other teams in their group once and the group winners (4 group winners) play 3 final fixtures against each other, producing 6 games a season for the group winners and just 3 games for the other teams that did not make the final stage. JCT won the title on better goal difference.

== League Tables ==
The first phase of the U-19 Football Tournament for I-League teams was held from 26 April – 6 May 2011 at four venues. Group A saw teams from Goa battling out for a place in the final round. Dempo, Salgaocar, Churchill Brothers and Sporting Clube de Goa are clubbed in Group A.

Kolkata hosted Group B encounters which featured East Bengal, Mohun Bagan, Chirag United and Shillong Lajong. ONGC, Mumbai, Pune FC and FC Air India were in Group C and played their matches in Mumbai with Punjab hosting Group D matches of teams comprising JCT, Viva Kerala and HAL.

=== Schedules and Results ===
==== Group A — Goa ====
| Team | Pld | W | D | L | GF | GA | GD | Pts |
|---|---|---|---|---|---|---|---|---|
| Churchill Brothers | 3 | 2 | 1 | 0 | 8 | 3 | +5 | 7 |
| Dempo | 3 | 2 | 0 | 1 | 12 | 5 | +7 | 6 |
| Sporting Clube de Goa | 3 | 1 | 1 | 1 | 8 | 11 | −3 | 4 |
| Salgaocar | 3 | 0 | 0 | 3 | 3 | 12 | −9 | 0 |

26 April 2011

| Dempo | 0–2 | Churchill Brothers |

Fatorda Stadium, Goa
26 April 2011

| Salgaocar | 2–3 | Sporting Clube de Goa |

Fatorda Stadium, Goa
28 April 2011

| Churchill Brothers | 3–0 | Salgaocar |

Fatorda Stadium, Goa
28 April 2011

| Sporting Clube de Goa | 2–6 | Dempo |

Fatorda Stadium, Goa
30 April 2011

| Churchill Brothers | 3–3 | Sporting Clube de Goa |

Fatorda Stadium, Goa
30 April 2011

| Dempo | 6–1 | Salgaocar |

Fatorda Stadium, Goa

==== Group B — Kolkata ====
| Team | Pld | W | D | L | GF | GA | GD | Pts |
|---|---|---|---|---|---|---|---|---|
| East Bengal | 3 | 3 | 0 | 0 | 6 | 0 | +6 | 9 |
| Mohun Bagan | 3 | 2 | 0 | 1 | 5 | 1 | +4 | 6 |
| Shillong Lajong | 3 | 1 | 0 | 2 | 2 | 4 | −2 | 3 |
| Chirag United | 3 | 0 | 0 | 3 | 0 | 4 | −4 | 0 |

2 May 2011

| East Bengal | 2–0 | Chirag United |

Salt Lake Stadium, Kolkata
2 May 2011

| Mohun Bagan | 2–1 | Shillong Lajong |

Salt Lake Stadium, Kolkata
4 May 2011

| Chirag United | 0–1 | Mohun Bagan |

Salt Lake Stadium, Kolkata
4 May 2011

| Shillong Lajong | 0–2 | East Bengal |

Salt Lake Stadium, Kolkata
6 May 2011

| Chirag United | 0–1 | Shillong Lajong |

Salt Lake Stadium, Kolkata
6 May 2011

| East Bengal | 2–0 | Mohun Bagan |

Salt Lake Stadium, Kolkata

==== Group C — Mumbai ====
| Team | Pld | W | D | L | GF | GA | GD | Pts |
|---|---|---|---|---|---|---|---|---|
| Mumbai | 3 | 1 | 2 | 0 | 9 | 5 | +4 | 5 |
| Air India | 3 | 1 | 2 | 0 | 5 | 2 | +3 | 5 |
| Pune | 3 | 1 | 2 | 0 | 3 | 1 | +2 | 5 |
| ONGC | 3 | 0 | 0 | 3 | 2 | 11 | −9 | 0 |

26 April 2011

| ONGC | 0–3 | FC Air India |

Cooperage Ground, Mumbai
26 April 2011

| Mumbai | 1–1 | Pune |

Cooperage Ground, Mumbai
28 April 2011

| Air India | 2–2 | Mumbai |

Cooperage Ground, Mumbai
28 April 2011

| Pune | 2–0 | ONGC |

Cooperage Ground, Mumbai
30 April 2011

| Mumbai | 6–2 | ONGC |

Cooperage Ground, Mumbai
30 April 2011

| Pune | 0–0 | Air India |

Cooperage Ground, Mumbai

==== Group D — Punjab ====
| Team | Pld | W | D | L | GF | GA | GD | Pts |
|---|---|---|---|---|---|---|---|---|
| JCT | 2 | 2 | 0 | 0 | 4 | 0 | +4 | 6 |
| HAL | 2 | 1 | 0 | 1 | 3 | 3 | +0 | 3 |
| Viva Kerala | 2 | 0 | 0 | 2 | 1 | 5 | −4 | 0 |

27 April 2011

| JCT | 2–0 | Viva Kerala |

Guru Nanak Stadium, Ludhiana
29 April 2011

| Viva Kerala | 1–3 | HAL |

Guru Nanak Stadium, Ludhiana
1 May 2011

| HAL | 0–2 | JCT |

Guru Nanak Stadium, Ludhiana

== Final phase ==
| Team | Pld | W | D | L | GF | GA | GD | Pts |
|---|---|---|---|---|---|---|---|---|
| JCT (C) | 3 | 2 | 1 | 0 | 6 | 1 | +5 | 7 |
| East Bengal | 3 | 2 | 1 | 0 | 6 | 3 | +3 | 7 |
| Mumbai | 3 | 1 | 0 | 2 | 5 | 7 | −2 | 3 |
| Churchill Brothers | 3 | 0 | 0 | 3 | 4 | 10 | −6 | 0 |

21 June 2011

| East Bengal | 2−0 | Mumbai |
|---|---|---|
| Nabin Hela 40', 59' | Report |

East Bengal Ground, Kolkata
21 June 2011

| JCT | 2−0 | Churchill Brothers |
|---|---|---|
| Gur Iqbal Singh 38'; Taran Taneja 73' | Report |

Mohammedan Sporting Ground, Kolkata
23 June 2011

| East Bengal | 4−3 | Churchill Brothers |
|---|---|---|
| Nabin Hela 4'; Moula 46'; Tanmay Kundu 50'; Ruidas | Report | Adwin Lucas 3'; Marcus Fernandes; Franky Oliveir |

East Bengal Ground, Kolkata
23 June 2011

| Mumbai | 1–4 | JCT |
|---|---|---|
| Mehta | Report | Doungel,, Gur Iqbal Singh |

Mohammedan Sporting Ground, Kolkata
25 June 2011

| East Bengal | 0−0 | JCT |
|---|---|---|
| | Report |

East Bengal Ground, Kolkata
25 June 2011

| Churchill Brothers | 1–4 | Mumbai |
|---|---|---|
| | Report |

Mohammedan Sporting Ground, Kolkata
