= Central Reserve Police Force Sporting Club =

Indian institutional football club based in Punjab

Central Reserve Police Force
- Full name: Central Reserve Police Force Sporting Club
- Ground: Guru Gobind Singh Stadium
- Capacity: 22,000
- Owner: Central Reserve Police Force
- League: Punjab State Super Football League (men); Indian Women's League (women)
Home colours	Away colours

Central Reserve Police Force Sporting Club is a football section which represents the Central Reserve Police Force of the Punjab Police. Based in Jalandhar, Punjab, they compete in the Punjab State Super Football League.

The team participated in both the second division of the National Football League in 2003, and the Durand Cup in 2012 and 2021. The Women's section has competed in the Indian Women's League and competes in Punjab Women's League at the state level.

== Honours ==
- Punjab Women's League
  - Champions (6): 2018, 2020–21, 2021–22, 2022–23, 2023–24, 2024–25

== See also ==
- List of football clubs in India
- Army Red
- Army Green
- Indian Air Force
- Indian Navy
- Services football team
- Railways football team
- Assam Rifles
- Punjab Police FC
- Border Security Force FC
- CISF Protectors football team
