= Senior Nehru Hockey Tournament =

- Sport: Field hockey
- Founded: 1964; 62 years ago
- Administrator: Jawaharlal Nehru Hockey Tournament Society
- Country: India
- Headquarters: Delhi
- Most recent champions: Indian Navy (2nd title)
- Most titles: Indian Airlines (10 titles)
- Website: nehruhockey.com

Senior Nehru Hockey Tournament is a field hockey tournament organized by the Jawaharlal Nehru Hockey Tournament Society (JNHTS). Instituted in 1964 by the Society, the All India Hockey Tournament is held as an annual feature at New Delhi.

== History ==
The tournament was instituted by the Jawaharlal Nehru Hockey Tournament Society which was founded in 1964, in memorial of India's first Prime Minister Jawaharlal Nehru. The All India Tournament was co-founded by H.C. Sarin, Shri Sayed Hamid and Inder Mohan Kapur to organize a top-class domestic hockey tournament in the capital.

The first edition was held in December 1964, where Northern Railway defeated South Eastern Railway 2–0 in the final.

The Society also started tournaments for other age groups such as Junior Tournament in 1972 for under-17 youth, Sub-Junior Tournament in 1983 for under-15 youth, Girls’ Tournament in 1993 for under-17 girls and the Champion College/Universities Tournament in 1993 which is now known as Inter-University Tournament.

The early decade of the tournament during the 1960–1970s was dominated by the Railway teams, especially Northern Railway (Delhi), Western Railway (Mumbai) and South Eastern Railway (Secunderabad).

== Venue ==
The matches are held at Shivaji Hockey Stadium, New Delhi. The 2021 edition was held at Hyderabad.

== Teams ==
The teams which participates in the tournament consists of public sector teams from across the country. The teams in the 57th edition includes CAG XI Indian Audit & Accounts Service, Indian Air Force, Indian Navy, Indian Oil, Indian Railways, Mumbai XI, PNB, Telangana XI, South Central Railway, ADGPI, Indian Army, Delhi XI, Punjab & Sind Bank, RCF and Tamil Nadu XI.

== Results ==
The results of the Senior Nehru Hockey Tournament:

Year	Winner	Runner-up
1964	Northern Railway	South Eastern Railway
1965	Sikh R.C. Meerut	Bombay XI
1966	I.H.F. (Blue) and I.H.F. (Red) were declared joint winners	
1967	Indian Navy and Northern Railway were declared joint winners	
1968	Indian Airlines and All India Police were declared joint winners	
1969	Corps of Signals	Northern Railway
1970	All India Police	Northern Railway
1971	Indian Airlines	(United Kingdom) Great Britain
1972	Corps of Signals	Northern Railway
1973	Northern Railway	Sikh R.C. Meerut
1974	Northern Railway	Western Railway
1975	B.S.F. Jalandhar	Punjab Police
1976	Punjab Police	A.S.C. Jalandhar
1977	B.S.F. Jalandhar	England XI
1978	B.S.F. Jalandhar	Punjab Police
1979	C.R.P. Force	B.S.F. Jalandhar
1980	Punjab Police	E.M.E. Jalandhar
1981	B.S.F. Jalandhar	A.S.C. Jalandhar
1982	Punjab Police	A.S.C. Jalandhar
1983	E.M.E. Jalandhar	C.R.P. Force
1984	Indian Airlines	B.S.F. Jalandhar
1985	Indian Airlines	Punjab Police
1986	Indian Airlines	Punjab Police
1987	B.S.F. Jalandhar	Indian Airlines
1988	Indian Airlines	R.C.F. Kapurthala
1989	I.H.F. (Red)	I.H.F. (White)
1990	Indian Airlines	Punjab & Sind Bank
1991	Punjab & Sind Bank	I.H.F. Junior A.S.
1992	Indian Airlines	B.S.F. Jalandhar
1993	Indian Airlines	B.S.F. Jalandhar
1994	Punjab Police	Air India Bombay
1995	Air India Bombay	Army XI
1996	B.S.F. Jalandhar	Punjab Police
1997	Air India Mumbais	Indian Airlines
1998	B.S.F. Jalandhar	Punjab & Sind Bank
1999	Punjab & Sind Bank	B.S.F. Jalandhar
2000	Indian Oil	Bharat Petroleum
2001	Air India, Mumbai	Punjab & Sind Bank
2002	Punjab Police	Indian Airlines
2003	Punjab Police	Indian Airlines
2004	Punjab Police	B. S. F.
2005	Indian Airlines	Punjab & Sind Bank
2006	Indian Oil	Namdhari XI
2007	Punjab & Sind Bank	Bharat Petroleum
2008	Indian Colts	Bharat Petroleum
2009	Indian Oil and Namdhari XI were declared joint winners	
2010	Air India	ONGC
2011	ONGC	Punjab National Bank
2012	Indian Oil	Bharat Petroleum
2013	Punjab & Sind Bank	Bharat Petroleum
2014	Indian Oil	Punjab & Sind Bank
2015	Punjab & Sind Bank	Punjab National Bank
2016	Indian Railways	Punjab National Bank
2017	Punjab National Bank	Punjab & Sind Bank
2018	Indian Railways	Punjab National Bank
2019	Punjab National Bank	Punjab Police
2021	Indian Oil	Indian Railways
2023	Indian Navy	CAG XI
