= Gurdev Singh Gill =

Gurdev Singh Gill may refer to:

- Gurdev Singh Gill (physician) (1931–2023), Canadian physician, community leader, and activist, of Indian origin
- Gurdev Singh Gill (footballer) (born 1950), Indian footballer
