= Mohan Kumar Mangalam Football Tournament =

- Organiser(s): Hindustan Zinc Limited
- Founded: 1976; 50 years ago
- Region: India
- Teams: Various
- Current champions: Delhi XI, Delhi

Mohan Kumar Mangalam Football Tournament commonly known as the MKM Trophy, MKM Memorial Football Tournament is an annual Indian football tournament held in Zawar Rajasthan and organized by Hindustan Zinc (HZL) and Zawar Mines Labour Union. The tournament was first started in 1976 and is named after Mohan Kumar Mangalam.

The current champions are Delhi XI who defeated DFA Udaipur on 30 January 2023. After a span of 33 years, a team hailing from Delhi secured this title.

== Venue ==
All matches are played at Zawar Stadium in Udaipur.

== Results ==
List of MKM Memorial tournament finals
Year	Champions	Score	Runners-up	Ref.
1976	Hindustan Zinc XI		Rabbani Sporting Club, Kamptee	
1977	Rajasthan Police, Bikaner		Bihar Regiment Center Danapur	
1978	Hyderabad XI		ITI, Bangalore	
1979	CRPF, Neemuch		Rajasthan Police, Bikaner	
1980	Eastern Railway, Kolkata		CEC, Cochin Edu City, Cochy	
1981	CRPF, Neemuch		Delhi Cantonment	
1982	RTBP, Dehradun		Bihar Regiment Center, Danapur	
1983	ASC Center, Bangalore		Western Railway, Mumbai	
1984	CRPF, Neemuch		Artillery Center, Secunderabad	
1985	ASC center, Bangalore		CRPF, Neemuch	
1986	Rashtriya Chemicals and Fertilizers Limited (RCF), Mumbai		CRPF, Neemuch	
1987	BEML Limited		Tata Sports Club, Mumbai	
1988	Garhwal Heroes FC		Hindustan Photo Film, Ooty	
1989	Rashtriya Chemicals and Fertilizers Limited (RCF), Mumbai		FCT, Calcutta	
1990	Students FC, Delhi		NLC India Ltd, Madras	
1991	Punjab Police		Hindustan Zinc XI	
1992	ITI, Bengaluru		Hindustan Zinc XI	
1993	Border Security Force		Punjab Police	
1994	Punjab State Electricity Board		Kerala State Electricity Board	
1995	Rail Couch Factory, Kapurthala		CRPF, Kolkata	
1996	Border Security Force		Ludhiana Police	
1997	Border Security Force		Punjab Police	
1998	Punjab Police		Punjab State Electricity Board	
1999	Punjab Police		Border Security Force	
2000	Kerala Financial Corporation		CRPF, Kolkata	
2001	National Aluminium Company (NALCO), Bhubaneswar		Gorkha Brigade Lucknow	
2002	Border Security Force		CRPF, Neemuch	
2003	Border Security Force		Rail Coach Factory Kapurthala	
2004	Border Security Force		11 Gorkha Rifles Regiment Center, Lucknow	
2005	Indian Air Force		JCT FC	
2006	Army XI		JCT FC	
2007	Corps of Signal		IISCO, Barnpur	
2008	Rail Couch Factory, Kapurthala		Central Railway, Mumbai	
2009	Lt. B Choudhary & Zawar Mines		Rajasthan Police, Jaipur	
2010	J&K Police, Jammu		Amity United FC	
2011	Uttarakhand Police, Dehradun	1–1, (4–3 p)	Union Bank of India	
2012	Union Bank of India		Army Juniors, Lucknow	
2013	RCF, Mumbai		Aikya Samilani Kolkata	
2017	Kerala Police FC		LNIPE, Gwalior	
2019	Gorkha Brigade, Lucknow		Hyderabad Police	
2020	Sikh Regiment, Jalandhar	2–0	Indian Air Force	
2023	Delhi XI, New Delhi	2-1	DFA Udaipur	
