= 2016 Sait Nagjee Trophy =

2016 Sait Nagjee International Club Football
Tournament details
- Country: India
- Dates: 5–21 February 2016
- Teams: 8

Final positions
- Champions: (Ukraine) FC Dnipro (R) (1st title)
- Runners-up: (Brazil) Atlético Paranaense (R)

Tournament statistics
- Matches played: 15
- Goals scored: 33 (2.2 per match)
- Top goal scorer(s): Vladyslav Kocherhin (3 goals)

The 2016 Sait Nagjee Trophy was the 36th edition of the Sait Nagjee Football Tournament and the first edition of the tournament since 1995. This tournament was organized by the Kozhikode District Football Association (KDFA) under the patronage of Dr. Siddeek Ahmed, President KDFA, and was held in Kozhikode, Kerala, India, from 5 to 21 February 2016. Along with clubs from different parts of the world, the Argentina U-23 national team also took part in the tournament. Brazilian footballer Ronaldinho is the brand ambassador for the tournament.

FC Dnipro Reserves won the trophy beating Atlético Paranaense Reserves in the final.

== Teams ==
| Team | Location | Confederation |
|---|---|---|
| FC Dnipro Reserves | Ukraine | UEFA |
| 1860 München II | (Germany) Munich | UEFA |
| Argentina U-23 | Argentina | CONMEBOL |
| Atlético Paranaense Reserves | (Brazil) Curitiba | CONMEBOL |
| Volyn Lutsk | Ukraine | UEFA |
| Rapid București | (Romania) Bucharest | UEFA |
| Shamrock Rovers | (Republic of Ireland) Dublin | UEFA |
| Watford Reserves | (England) Watford | UEFA |

== Venue ==
Kozhikode
EMS Corporation Stadium
Capacity: 50,000
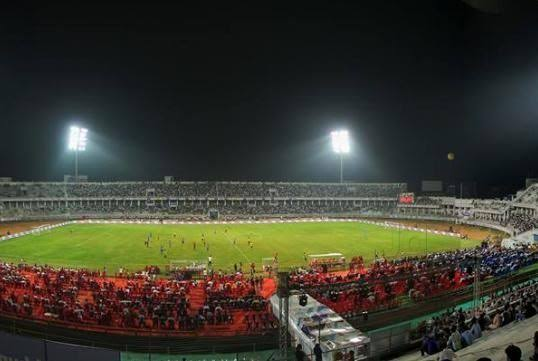

== Group stage ==
=== Group A ===
| Pos | Team | Pld | W | D | L | GF | GA | GD | Pts | Qualification |
|---|---|---|---|---|---|---|---|---|---|---|
| 1 | (Brazil) Atlético Paranaense (R) | 3 | 2 | 1 | 0 | 5 | 2 | +3 | 7 | Advance to Semi-finals |
| 2 | (England) Watford (R) | 3 | 1 | 1 | 1 | 3 | 3 | 0 | 4 | Advance to Semi-finals |
| 3 | (Ukraine) Volyn Lutsk | 3 | 0 | 3 | 0 | 4 | 4 | 0 | 3 | |
| 4 | (Romania) Rapid București | 3 | 0 | 1 | 2 | 1 | 4 | −3 | 1 | |

Source: Report
Rules for classification: 1) points; 2) goal difference; 3) goals scored; 4) head-to-head result.
5 February 2016
18:30

| (Brazil) Atlético Paranaense (R) | 2–0 | (England) Watford (R) |
|---|---|---|
| Luisinho 60'; João Pedro 62' | Report(subscription required) |

EMS Stadium, Kozhikode
Attendance: approx. 35,000
7 February 2016
18:30

| (Romania) Rapid București | 1–1 | (Ukraine) Volyn Lutsk |
|---|---|---|
| Tudoran 13' | Report | Memeshev 59' |

EMS Stadium, Kozhikode
Attendance: approx. 22,500
9 February 2016
18:30

| (England) Watford (R) | 2–0 | (Romania) Rapid București |
|---|---|---|
| Jakubiak 23'; Mensah 57' | Report |

EMS Stadium, Kozhikode
11 February 2016
18:30

| (Ukraine) Volyn Lutsk | 2–2 | (Brazil) Atlético Paranaense (R) |
|---|---|---|
| Lohinov 29'; Memeshev 63' | Report | Wesley Silva 21'; Yago Silva 90' |

EMS Stadium, Kozhikode
13 February 2016
18:30

| (Brazil) Atlético Paranaense (R) | 1–0 | (Romania) Rapid București |
|---|---|---|
| Mauricio Pedro 65' | Report |

EMS Stadium, Kozhikode
15 February 2016
18:30

| (England) Watford (R) | 1–1 | (Ukraine) Volyn Lutsk |
|---|---|---|
| Jakubiak 90' (pen.) | Report | Kravchenko 10' |

EMS Stadium, Kozhikode

=== Group B ===
| Pos | Team | Pld | W | D | L | GF | GA | GD | Pts | Qualification |
|---|---|---|---|---|---|---|---|---|---|---|
| 1 | (Ukraine) FC Dnipro (R) | 3 | 2 | 1 | 0 | 4 | 0 | +4 | 7 | Advance to Semi-finals |
| 2 | (Republic of Ireland) Shamrock Rovers | 3 | 2 | 0 | 1 | 4 | 4 | 0 | 6 | Advance to Semi-finals |
| 3 | (Germany) 1860 München II | 3 | 1 | 1 | 1 | 5 | 3 | +2 | 4 | |
| 4 | Argentina U-23 | 3 | 0 | 0 | 3 | 0 | 6 | −6 | 0 | |

Source: Report
Rules for classification: 1) points; 2) goal difference; 3) goals scored; 4) head-to-head result.
6 February 2016
18:30

| Argentina U-23 | 0–3 | (Germany) 1860 München II |
|---|---|---|
| | Report | Bachschmid 18'; Seferings 25'; Köppel 78' |

EMS Stadium, Kozhikode
Attendance: approx. 20,000
8 February 2016
18:30

| (Republic of Ireland) Shamrock Rovers | 0–2 | (Ukraine) FC Dnipro (R) |
|---|---|---|
| | Report | Kocherhin 32'; Kireyev 76' |

EMS Stadium, Kozhikode
Attendance: approx. 20,000
10 February 2016
18:30

| (Germany) 1860 München II | 2–3 | (Republic of Ireland) Shamrock Rovers |
|---|---|---|
| Kokocinski 14' (pen.) 42' (pen.) | Report | McCabe 32' (pen.); North 45'; G. Brennan 52' |

EMS Stadium, Kozhikode
12 February 2016
18:30

| (Ukraine) FC Dnipro (R) | 2–0 | Argentina U-23 |
|---|---|---|
| Vakulko 90+1'; Kireyev 90+4' | Report |

EMS Stadium, Kozhikode
14 February 2016
18:30

| Argentina U-23 | 0–1 | (Republic of Ireland) Shamrock Rovers |
|---|---|---|
| | Report | K. Brennan 67' |

EMS Stadium, Kozhikode
16 February 2016
18:30

| (Germany) 1860 München II | 0–0 | (Ukraine) FC Dnipro (R) |
|---|---|---|
| | Report |

EMS Stadium, Kozhikode

== Knock-out phase ==
=== Bracket ===
Semi-finals
A1 | Atlético Paranaense (R) | 1
B2 | Shamrock Rovers | 0
A2 | FC Dnipro | 3
B1 | Watford (R) | 0

Final
Atlético Paranaense (R) | 0
FC Dnipro (R) | 3

=== Semi-finals ===
18 February 2016
18:30

| (Brazil) Atlético Paranaense (R) | 1–0 | (Republic of Ireland) Shamrock Rovers |
|---|---|---|
| Yago Silva 62' | Report |

EMS Stadium, Kozhikode

19 February 2016
18:30

| (Ukraine) FC Dnipro (R) | 3–0 (a.e.t.) | (England) Watford (R) |
|---|---|---|
| Kocherhin 93'; Lunyov 109'; Simpson 120' (o.g.) | Report |

EMS Stadium, Kozhikode

=== Final ===
21 February 2016
18:30

| (Brazil) Atlético Paranaense (R) | 0–3 | (Ukraine) FC Dnipro (R) |
|---|---|---|
| | Report | Kohut 41'; Balanyuk 62'; Vakulko 86' |

EMS Stadium, Kozhikode
Attendance: 48,900
