= 2020–21 Punjab State Super Football League =

Punjab State Super Football League
- Season: 2020-21
- Champions: Punjab Police
- Matches played: 24
- All statistics correct as of 20 July 2021.

The 2020-21 Punjab State Super Football League was the 34th season of the Punjab State Super Football League, the top-tier football league in the Indian state of Punjab. Punjab Police are the champions. The league commenced from 19 December 2020. Punjab Police FC, who were runners up last season, became champions this year.

== Teams ==
A total number of 7 teams participated in the league. Last season champions Punjab FC didn't participated.

Club	City/Town
Punjab Police FC	Jalandhar
CRPF FC	Jalandhar
Dalbir FC	Patiala
SGHS FA	
Khalsa Warriors FC	Chandigarh
Guru FC	Jalandhar
Kehar FC	Jalandhar

== Standings ==
Team	Pld	W	D	L	GF	GA	GD	Pts
Punjab Police	6	4	1	1	7	4	+3	13
CRPF FC	6	4	1	1	11	3	+8	13
Dalbir FC	6	3	2	1	12	3	+9	11
SGHS FA	6	2	3	1	4	4	0	9
Khalsa Warriors	6	2	1	3	3	10	-7	7
Guru FC	6	1	0	5	2	11	-9	3
Kehar FC	6	1	0	5	6	10	-4	3
