= Sait Nagjee Football Tournament =

Nagjee International Club Football
- Founded: 1952; 74 years ago
- Abolished: 2016
- Region: India
- Teams: 16
- Last champions: Dnipro Reserves (1st title)
- Most championships: Mohammedan; JCT (4 titles each)
- Broadcasters: NEO Prime; Kappa TV

The Sait Nagjee All India Football Tournament was an invitational football tournament held in Kozhikode, Kerala. The tournament was very popular from the beginning and attracted large crowd since 1952. The tournament was played until 1995, though with stoppages a couple of times. In 1995, the tournament was won by JCT Mills. Since then, there was a gap of 21 year during which the tournament was not held.

The tournament was revived again in 2016 with clubs from different parts of the world and Argentina national under-23 football team. Brazilian footballer Ronaldinho was the brand ambassador for the tournament. FC Dnipro Reserves won the trophy beating Atlético Paranaense Reserves in the final.

== Stadium ==
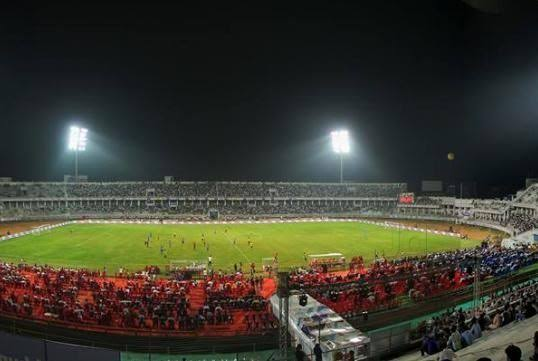
EMS Stadium on a matchday

All the matches of the tournament are played in the EMS Stadium, which is located in Calicut.

== Results ==
List of winners and runners-ups:

Years	Winners	Runners-up	Score	Note
1952	HAL	Lucky Star, Kannur	-	
1953	HAL	Mysore Muslims	-	
1954	HAL	Dianomos, Bombay	-	
1955	(Pakistan) Karachi Kickers	Gymkhana, Kannur	2–0	
1956	(Pakistan) Karachi Kickers	Southern Railway Institute	-	
1957	MRC, Wellington	515, Command Work Shop	-	
1958	Andhra Police	Eastern Railway	-	
1959	Andhra Police	State Transport, Trivandrum	-	
1960	MEG, Bangalore	Indian Airforce, Bangalore	-	
1961	Tournament not held			
1962	Punjab Police	Andhra Assn. XI	-	
1963	Tournament not held			
1964	MRC, Wellington	EME, Secunderabad	-	
1965	EME, Secunderabad	MRC, Wellington	-	
1966	EME, Secunderabad	Leaders Club, Jalandhar	-	
1967	Alind Kundara, Kerala	Andhra Assn. XI	-	
1968	East Bengal	MEG, Bangalore	2–0	
1969	Vasco	Border Security Force	1–0	
1970	Border Security Force	Sesa	3–1	
1971	Mohammedan Sporting	Dempo	2–0	
1972	RAC, Bikaner	Tata Sports Club	-	
1973	Tata Sports Club	Titanium	-	
1974	Indian XI	RAC, Bikaner	-	
1975	Rajasthan Police, Jaipur	Mahindra & Mahindra	-	
1976	JCT	Andhra Assn. XI	-	
1977	MRC, Wellington	Andhra Assn. XI	-	
1978	Mohun Bagan	Titanium	-	
1979	JCT	Mohammedan Sporting	-	
1980	Tournament not held			
1981	Mohun Bagan	Tata Sports Club	-	
1982	Tournament not held			
1983	Tournament not held			
1984	Mohammedan Sporting	Mohun Bagan	-	
1985	JCT	Salgaocar	4–2	
1986	East Bengal	Kerala XI	1–0	
1987	Tournament not held			
1988	Salgaocar	(Bangladesh) Mohammedan Sporting	1–0	
1989	(Bangladesh) Abahani Krira Chakra	Salgaocar	1–0	
1990	Tournament not held			
1991	Mohammedan Sporting	Indian XI	-	
1992	Mohammedan Sporting	Titanium	2–1	
1993	Tournament not held			
1994	Tournament not held			
1995	JCT	Dempo	-	
	Tournament not held between 1996-2015			
2016	(Ukraine) Dnipro Reserves	(Brazil) Atlético Paranaense Reserves	3–0	
