= Surjit Hockey Society =

- Formation: 13 May 1984
- Purpose: To Hold Surjit Memorial Hockey tournament for men and women, every year
- Headquarters: Jalandhar
- Website: surjithockey.com

The Surjit Hockey Society is an Indian society established in 1984 after Olympian Sardar Surjit Singh Randhawa. Since its establishment the society has organized the Surjit Memorial Hockey Tournament in Jalandhar every year. The society has the current Chief Minister of Punjab as its Chief Patron. Every year a hockey camp is held in an effort to find talented hockey players from the surrounding areas of Punjab. In 2012, in an effort to revive the sport in the state, Government of Punjab announced its decision to support the society.

== Management ==
- President - Ghanshayam Thory, IAS, Deputy Commissioner, Jalandhar
- Working President : Pargat Singh
- Senior Vice Presidents - Sarojini Sharda, Viney Bublani, G. S. Khaira, Amril Sinmgh Powar and Lakhwinder Pal Singh Khaira
- Secretary General - Iqbal Singh Sandhu, PCS (Retd)
- Chief Public Relations Officer of Society - Surinder Singh Bhapa

== List of presidents ==
Number	Name	Years
1	K K Bhatnagar	1984–1985
2	S C Aggarwal	1985–1987
3	Sudhir Mittal	1987–1990
4	N. S. Kang	1990–1992
5	Karan A. Singh	1992–1992
6	S. K. Kakkar	1992–1995
7	D. P. Ready	1995–1995
8	M. P. Singh	1995–1998
9	Som Parkash	1998–2000
10	K Shiva Parshad	2000–2003
11	Ashok Kumar Gupta	2003–2006
12	Anurag Verma	2006–2006
13	A. Venu Parsad	2006–2007
14	Ajeet Singh Pannu	2007–2010
15	Priyank Bharti	2010–2013
14	Sharuti Singh	2013–2013
14	Varun Roozam	2013–2014
14	Kamal Kishore Yadav	2014–2017
14	Varinder Kumar Sharma	2017–2020
14	Ghanshayam Thory	2020–present
