= Surjit Memorial Hockey Tournament =

Hockey event in Punjab, India

- Sport: Field hockey
- Founded: 1984; 42 years ago
- Administrator: Surjit Hockey Society
- Country: India
- Headquarters: Jalandhar
- Most recent champions: Indian Oil Mumbai (5th title)
- Most titles: Punjab & Sind Bank (11 titles)
- Website: surjithockey.com

The Surjit Memorial Hockey Tournament (also known as the Indian Oil Servo Surjit Hockey Tournament for sponsorship reason) is organized by Surjit Hockey Society every year in Jalandhar, Punjab. The tournament was instituted in memorial of Surjit Singh.

== Venue ==
The matches are held at Surjit Hockey Stadium.

== Teams ==
The teams which participates in the tournament consists of public sector teams from across the country, such as:

- Indian Oil, Mumbai
- Army-XI, Delhi
- Corps of Signal, Jalandhar
- ONGC, Delhi
- Punjab National Bank, Delhi
- Bharat Petroleum, Mumbai
- BSF, Jalandhar
- Namdhari-XI, Sirsa
- Punjab Police, Jalandhar
- Punjab & Sind Bank, Jalandhar
- RCF, Kapurthala
- Northern Railways, Delhi
- CRPF, Delhi

== Results ==
The results of the Surjit Memorial Hockey Tournament:

Year	Winner	Runner-up
1984	Western Command	PSEB, Patiala
1985	Punjab Police	PSEB, Patiala
1986	Punjab Police	BSF Jalandhar
1987	RCF Kapurthala	JCT Phagwara
1988	Punjab & Sind Bank	BSF Jalandhar
1989	Punjab & Sind Bank	BSF Jalandhar
1990	Services XI	RCF Kapurthala
1991	ASC, Jalandhar	PSEB, Patiala
1992	Punjab & Sind Bank	Air India Mumbai
1993	Punjab & Sind Bank	Punjab Police
1994	Punjab & Sind Bank	Air India Mumbai
1995	Punjab Police	Air India Mumbai
1996	Army-XI Delhi	Punjab Police
1997	Punjab Police	Punjab & Sind Bank
1998	BSF Jalandhar	Punjab & Sind Bank
1999	BSF Jalandhar	Punjab & Sind Bank
2000	Punjab Police	Punjab & Sind Bank
2001	Punjab & Sind Bank	Punjab Police
2002	Bharat Petroleum	Punjab & Sind Bank
2003	Bharat Petroleum	BSF Jalandhar
2004	Punjab & Sind Bank	Punjab Police
2005	Indian Airlines, Delhi	Indian Oil Corporation
2006	Punjab & Sind Bank	Indian Oil Corporation
2007	Indian Oil Mumbai	Indian Airlines
2008	Punjab & Sind Bank	(Pakistan) Javed Hockey Club, Gojra
2009	Bharat Petroleum	Indian Oil Mumbai
2010	Indian Oil Mumbai	Air India
2011	Air India	Indian Oil Corporation
2012	Indian Oil Corporation	Bharat Petroleum
2013	Punjab & Sind Bank	Indian Oil Corporation
2014	Indian Oil Mumbai	Punjab & Sind Bank
2015	Indian Railways	Indian Oil Mumbai
2016	Punjab National Bank	Army-XI Delhi
2017	Punjab Police	ONGC
2018	Army-XI Delhi	Indian Railways
2019	Punjab & Sind Bank	Indian Oil Mumbai
2020	Tournament not held	
2021	Indian Railways	Punjab & Sind Bank
2022	Indian Railways	Indian Oil Mumbai
2023	Indian Oil Mumbai	CAG New Delhi
