= JCT FC =

Former Indian association football club

JCT
- Full name: Jagatjit Cotton & Textile Mills FC
- Nickname: The Millmen
- Founded: 1971; 55 years ago
- Dissolved: 2011; 15 years ago (senior squad dissolved, academy still continues to participate in Punjab State Super Football League)
- Ground: Guru Nanak Stadium
- Capacity: 30,000
- Chairman: Samir Thapar
- League: National Football League; Punjab State Super Football League
- Website: www.jctfootball.com
Home colours	Away colours

Jagatjit Cotton & Textile Football Club (formerly known as JCT Mills FC; abbreviated as JCT FC, or simply JCT) is an Indian football academy based in Phagwara, Punjab. Founded in 1971, the club was sponsored by Jagatjit Cotton and Textile Mills under the leadership of Samir Thapar and participated in the National Football League which was later rebranded as I-League. The club currently participates in Punjab State Super Football League after disbanding their senior squad in 2011.

Nicknamed "The Millmen", JCT have won many tournaments and brought laurels to the State of Punjab. They won the inaugural edition of the National Football League in 1996. They were one of the benchmark teams in North Punjab along with Border Security Force and Punjab Police, winning prestigious state level tournaments. They were the first team from India to sign a foreign coach and the first team outside of Calcutta to win the IFA Shield, the second oldest football tournament in India. JCT's corporate team also took part in All India Public Sector tournaments.

In 2011, JCT emerged as the sixth-ranked Indian team, and 957th universally, in the international ranking of clubs during the first ten years of the 21st century (2001–2010), issued by the International Federation of Football History & Statistics.

== History ==
Jagatjit Cotton, Sahil Bagga and Textile Mills constituted the football club in March 1971. However, the club got recognition from 1974 onwards when several players joined the club from the Leaders Club of Jalandhar. Included among these players was Inder Singh, who had captained the India national team in previous years, won the Arjuna Award in 1969, and managed the club until 2001. The Leader Club, started by Lala Dwarka Das Sehgal had played a major role in popularizing football in Northern India in the 1960s and 1970s. After the end of Leaders Club era, JCT Mills have since taken the mantle and become the biggest and most successful football club in this part of India. In 1983, British coach Bob Bootland took charge of JCT and guided the team winning the Durand Cup same year.

JCT Limited had been involved in the Punjab Football Association (PFA) for the three decades. On 1 July 1992, the club appointed former Indian international Sukhwinder Singh, who previously played for the club, as chief coach; He served as deputy general manager and joint secretary as well. In 1995, they clinched Scissors Cup title, defeating Malaysia Premier League side Perlis F.A. 1–0. In 1996, they emerged champions in the Federation Cup, defeating East Bengal 5–3 through penalties. JCT won the inaugural NFL title in the 1996–97 season. In that season, they clinched the prestigious IFA Shield title, defeating Iraqi Premier League side Al-Karkh SC by 1–0. In January 2007, the JCT management decided to change the club name from JCT Mills FC to JCT FC.

In 2007, JCT announced an association with the English club Wolverhampton Wanderers, as part of the Wolverhampton-India Project launched at the House of Commons of the United Kingdom. In the inaugural season of I-League, JCT achieved third place, with 33 points.

In 2011, two members from the Wolves Academy members visited the club with an intention "to start special training programmes". However, a few months later, in June, the club announced of its disbanding. In a statement, the club said, "Today football teams worldwide have become self-sustaining enterprises for which high exposure is needed to build viewership and spectators in the stadium. JCT won the inaugural national league in 1996, where there was high quality TV exposure and widespread public interest. But since then the league has had negligible exposure and the teams have been going almost unnoticed." It added, "JCT Limited, being a corporate, needs to justify to its stakeholders the effort vs visibility of the football team."

In 2014, reports said that the club was planning on a return to professional football through I-League 2nd Division the following season; however, it failed to materialize. Though the official club body maintained JCT's football-centric activities and academies, and trials until 2015, alongside acquiring services of Spanish UEFA A license holder coach Juan Jose Royan Balco.

== Stadium ==
JCT Mills used Guru Nanak Stadium of Ludhiana. It served as club's home ground for National Football League and Punjab State Super League matches. The stadium has a capacity of approximately 30,000 spectators.

JCT Mills has also used Guru Gobind Singh Stadium in Jalandhar for some seasonal home matches of the National Football League and Punjab State Football League.

== Rivalries ==
JCT shared rivalry with local side FC Punjab Police, which emerged as one of the strongest sides in Punjab State Super League. They have also enjoyed rivalries with two other local sides: Leaders Club (Jalandhar), and Border Security Force. In the 1960s nd 70s, the club shared a fierce rivalry with Mohammedan Sporting of Kolkata.

== Notable players ==
For all former notable JCT Mills FC players with a Wikipedia article, see: JCT Mills FC players.

Noted Indian internationals

- Sunil Chhetri – all-time top goalscorer of the India national team, played for the club from 2005 to 2008.
- (India) I. M. Vijayan – three-time AIFF Player of the Year winner (among those, won with JCT in 1997)
- (India) Inder Singh – AFC Asian Cup top scorer in 1964, and AFC Asian All Stars inductee in 1968.
- Bhaichung Bhutia – captained both India and JCT, recipient of Arjuna Award and the Padma Shri (golden boot winner in the NFL with JCT in 1996–97).
- Sukhwinder Singh – served as both captain and head coach of India, first chief coach of JCT (who managed the club from late 1990s to 2001); recipient of Dhyan Chand Award in 2020.
- Jo Paul Ancheri – captained both India and JCT, and was awarded the AIFF Player of the Year by All India Football Federation in 1994 and 2001.
- (India) Deepak Mondal – recipient of both the Arjuna Award and AIFF Player of the Year; represented JCT from 1998 to 2000.

Foreign international(s)

- Julius Akpele (2004–2006; 2008–09) – represented Nigeria between 1992 and 1994.

== Performance in AFC competitions ==
- Asian Club Championship: 1 appearance

1996–97: Second Round

== Achievements ==
In last 3 decades of its existence, the JCT FC is the first Indian team outside Kolkata to win the prestigious IFA Shield, (in 1996, in which they defeated Iraqi Premier League club Al-Karkh, by 1–0). Apart from this, the JCT Club won many prestigious tournaments. They also won the opening edition of the National Football League in 1996–97. JCT has also participated in the Asian Club Championship during its 1996–97 season and reached the second round. They also achieved third place in 2007–08 season of the newly formed I-League.

The club was an eight-time winner of the Punjab State Football League and five-time winner of the Durand Cup. The club's success and consistently strong performance are attributed to its owners, the Thapars, who, apart from being business moguls, have made constant efforts to raise the standard of their club at every level.

== Affiliated clubs ==
The following clubs were affiliated with JCT FC:

- (England) Wolverhampton Wanderers FC (2007–2011)
- (India) Hindustan FC (2010–2011)

== Team records ==
=== Notable wins against foreign teams ===
As of matches played 2 August 2024

Competition	Round	Year	Opposition	Score	Venue	City	Ref
DCM Trophy	Group stage	1977	(Malaysia) Terengganu	6–0	Ambedkar Stadium	New Delhi	
Scissors Cup	Final	1995	(Malaysia) Perlis	1–0	Kozhikode Corporation EMS Stadium	Kozhikode	
IFA Shield	Final	1996	(Iraq) Al-Karkh	1–0	Salt Lake Stadium	Kolkata	
Durand Cup	Final	1996	(Iraq) Al-Naft	1–0	Jawaharlal Nehru Stadium	Kochi	
Asian Club Championship	First round	1996	(Nepal) New Road Team	2–2 (4–2 p)	Guru Nanak Stadium	Ludhiana	
Asian Club Championship	Second round	1996	(Maldives) New Radiant	1–0	Guru Nanak Stadium	Ludhiana	

== Honours ==
=== League ===
- National Football League
  - Champions (1): 1996–97
  - Runners-up (1): 2006–07
- I-League
  - Third place (1): 2007–08
- National Football League III
  - Runners-up (1): 2006–07
- Punjab State Super Football League
  - Champions (9): 1987, 1990–91, 1991, 1995, 2002, 2003, 2004–05, 2005–06, 2006–07
  - Runners-up (4): 1985–86, 1988, 1992–93, 1999

=== Cup ===
- Federation Cup
  - Winners (2): 1995, 1996
- Durand Cup
  - Winners (5): 1976, 1983, 1987, 1992, 1996
  - Runners-up (7): 1974, 1975, 1977, 1981, 1985, 2006, 2010
- IFA Shield (Note: Fourth oldest football tournament, organized by the IFA (W.B.), and played between the local clubs of West Bengal and other invited ones.)
  - Winners (1): 1996
- Rovers Cup
  - Winners (1): 1997
  - Runners-up (3): 1979–80, 1984, 1992
- Indian Super Cup
  - Runners-up (1): 1997
- Punjab State Senior Championship
  - Champions (6): 1977, 1979–80, 1981, 1982, 1987, 1989
  - Runners-up (2): 1984–85, 1985
- Gurdarshan Memorial Cup
  - Winners (10): 1982, 1983, 1985, 1988, 1989, 1990, 1992, 1995, 2001, 2002
  - Runners-up (2): 1991, 2003
- Sait Nagjee Football Tournament
  - Winners (4): 1976, 1979, 1985, 1995
- Madura Coats Trophy
  - Winners (1): 1982, 1985
- Bokaro Cup
  - Winners (1): 1983
- Scissors Cup
  - Winners (1): 1995
- Shaheed-e-Azam Sardar Bhagat Singh Memorial Trophy
  - Winners (1): 2002
  - Runners-up (1): 1998
- Principal Harbhajan Singh Memorial Football Trophy
  - Winners (2): 2005, 2009
- DCM Trophy
  - Runners-up (3): 1977, 1987, 1993
- Mohan Kumar Mangalam Football Tournament
  - Runners-up (2): 2005, 2006
- Aurungabad Mayor's Trophy
  - Runners-up (1): 2006

=== Tournaments won by JCT academy ===
- I-League U19
  - Champions (1): 2011
- National Football League U19
  - Runners-up (1): 2002–03
- All India MKM Football Championship
  - Runners-up (2): 2005, 2006
- Sardar Santa Singh Bhaur Memorial Trophy
  - Champions (1): 2006
- Sant Baba Hari Singh ji Naiki Wale Trophy
  - Champions (1): 2007
- JRD Tata Youth Cup
  - Runners-up (1): 2008
- Man United Premier Cup India
  - Runners-up (1): 2010
- All India Principal Harbhajan Singh Memorial Cup (U-17 Category)
  - Champions (1): 2025

== Partnership ==
=== India On Track ===
In 2015, JCT FC entered into the partnership with India On Track to re-launch the club in the 2015–16 season of the I-League 2nd division. The aim of the partnership is to provide elite residential training and uplifting the development of its academy at Hoshiarpur, Punjab.

== Other departments ==
=== JCT FC academy and youth teams ===
JCT FC launched their U-19 academy in 1998 and participated in the first National Football League (under-19) in October 2001. In the next edition between May and June 2003, they reached the finals. JCT Football Academy won the 2011 I-League U19. In 2011, their senior team was disbanded, but the academy continued to operate. The academy team later participated in the 2012 Durand Cup. JCT academy team later participated in Punjab State League. They incorporated under-16 academy in 2005 at Rurka Kalan, and participated in Subroto Mukherjee Cup and Inter-school Games organized under the banner of School Games Federation of India. Club's U-15 team also took part in Manchester United Premier Cup of India. Later in 2022, JCT FC academy competed in Shaheed-e-Azam Sardar Bhagat Singh Memorial Tournament in Banga.

=== Futsal ===
Beside football, JCT FC is operating futsal teams, currently competing in the AIFF Futsal Club Championship.

== Gallery ==
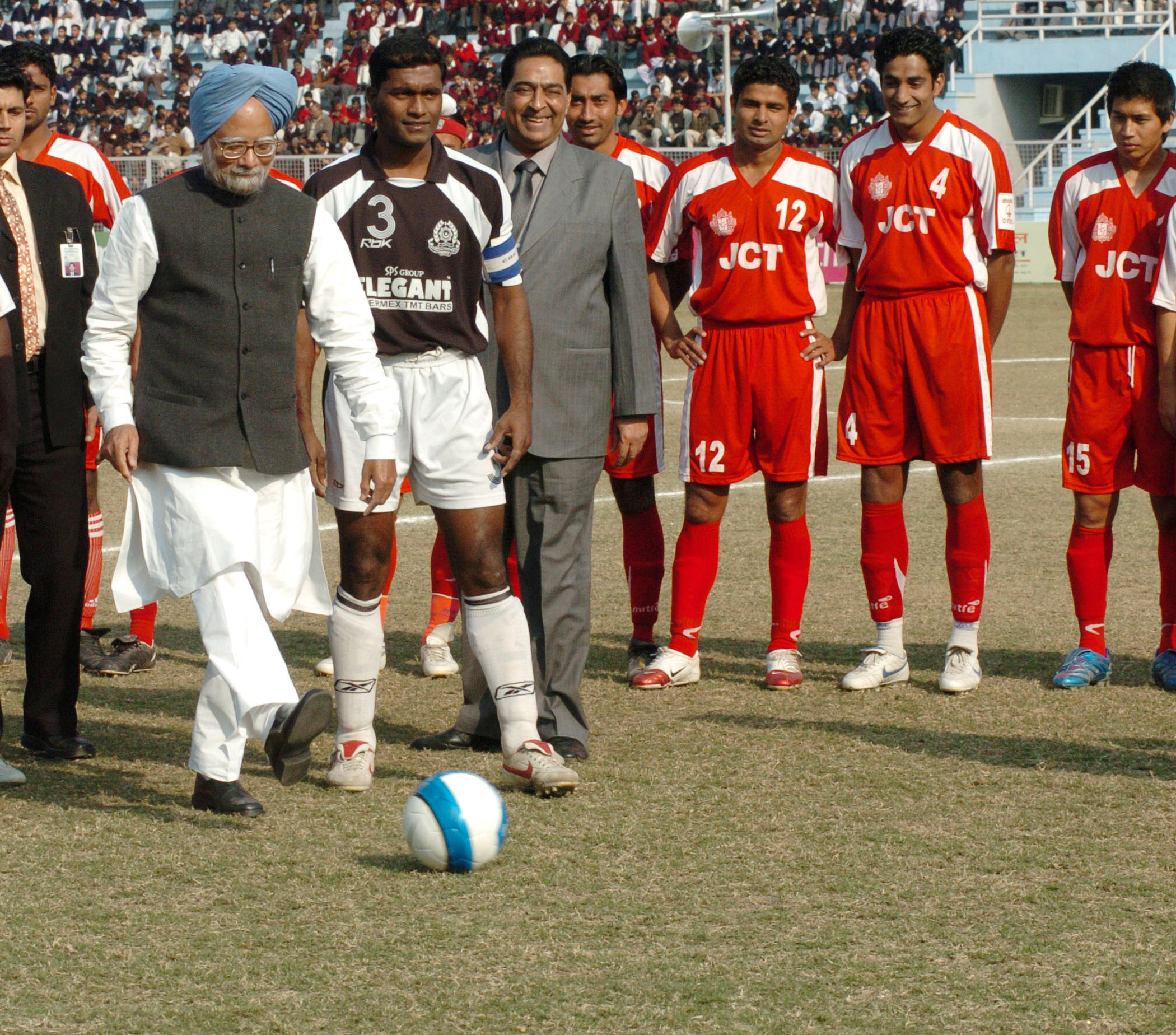
Then Prime Minister of India, Manmohan Singh, with JCT players (in red) during the inauguration of 2006–07 National Football League.

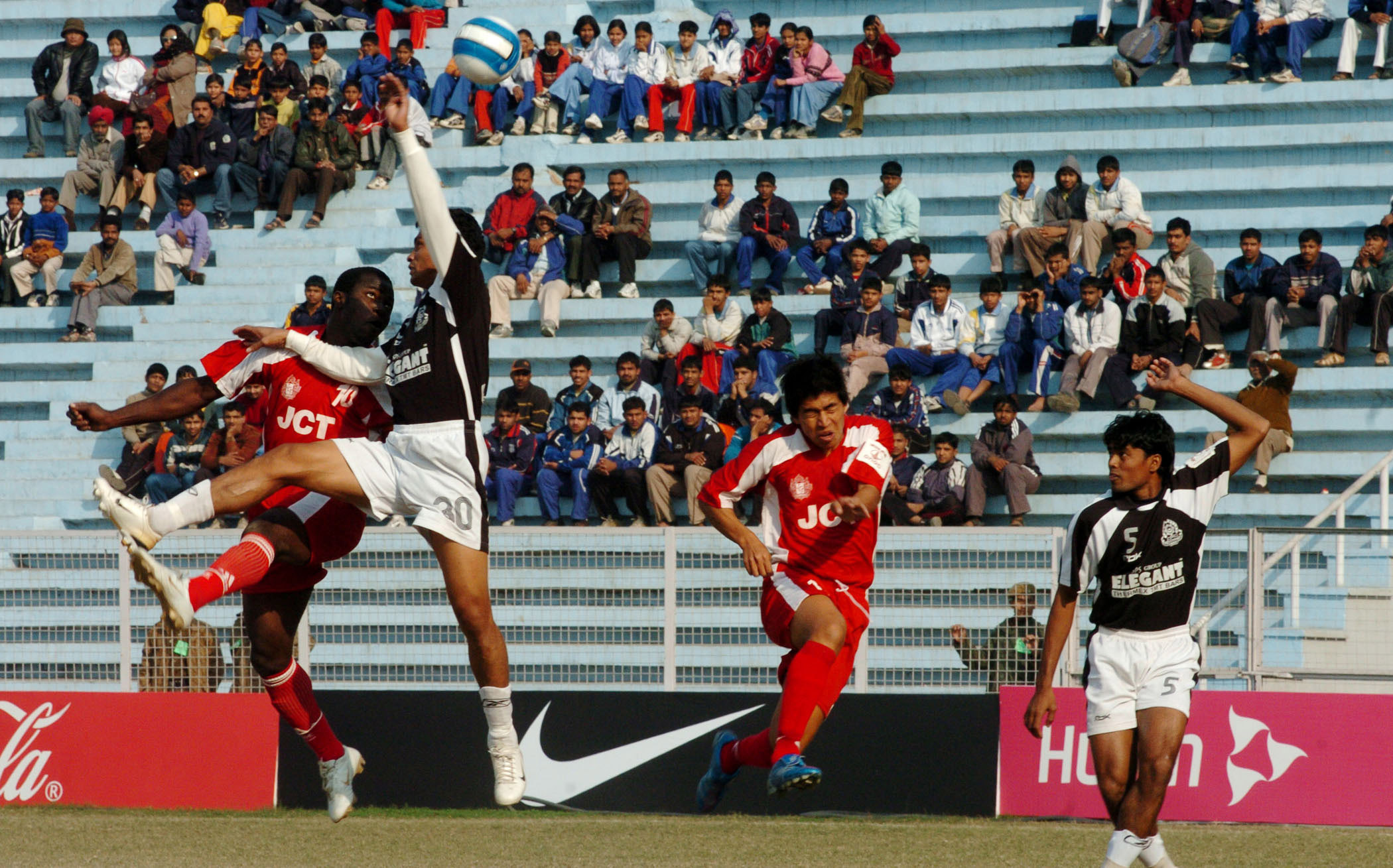
Mohammedan Sporting vs JCT Mills FC in the 2006–07 National Football League at Ambedkar Stadium.

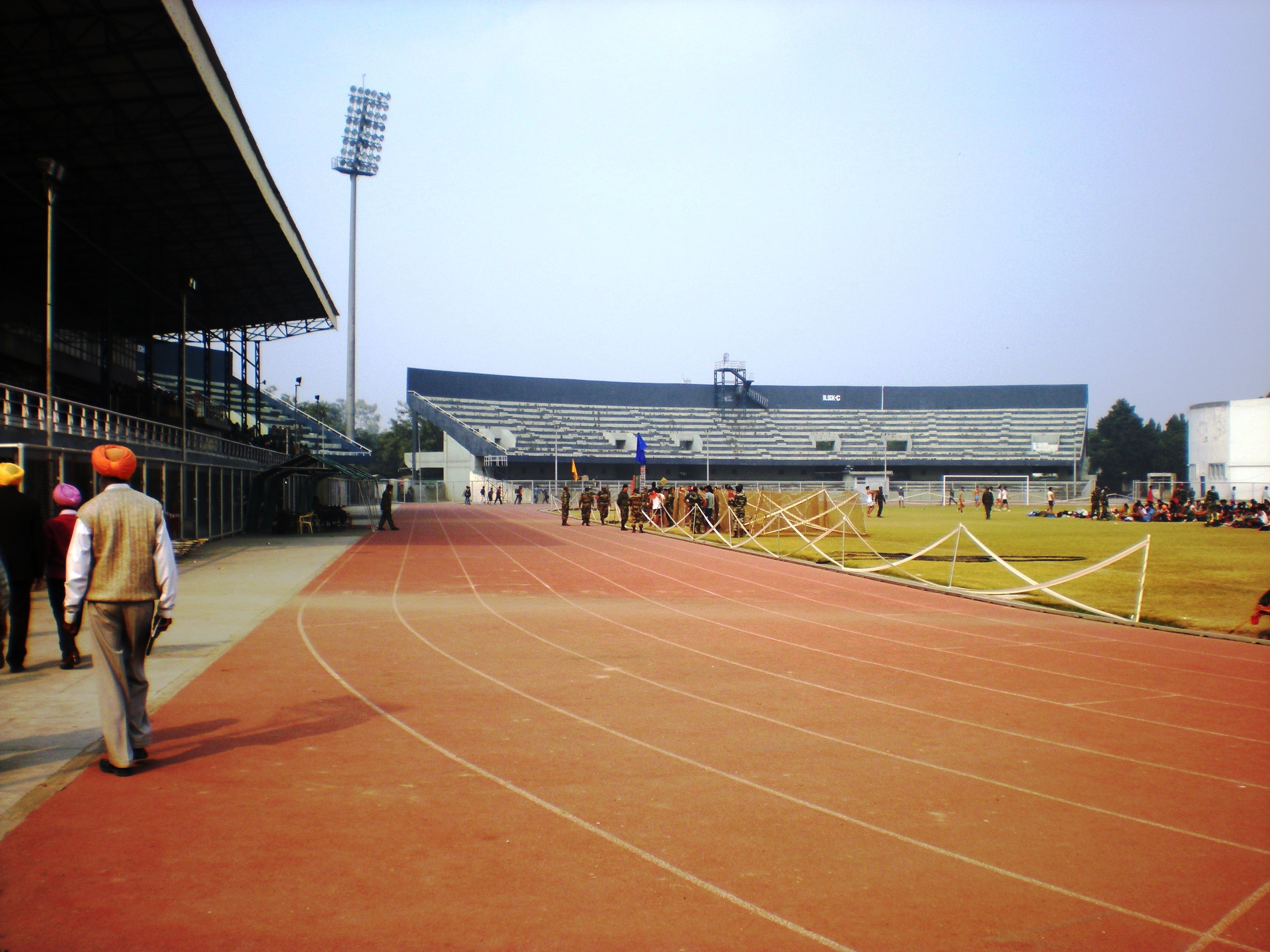
Guru Nanak Stadium in Ludhiana on a matchday

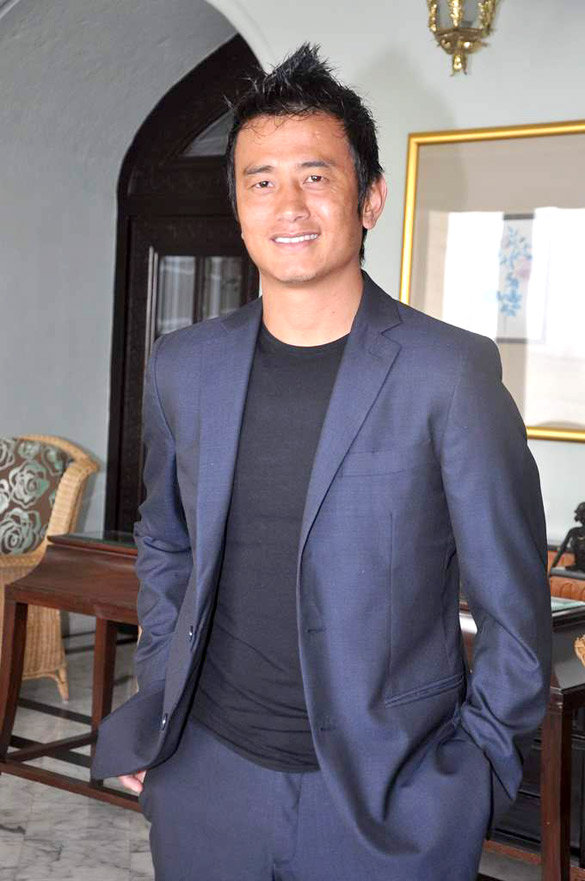
Bhaichung Bhutia, India captain, played for JCT from 1995 to 1997.

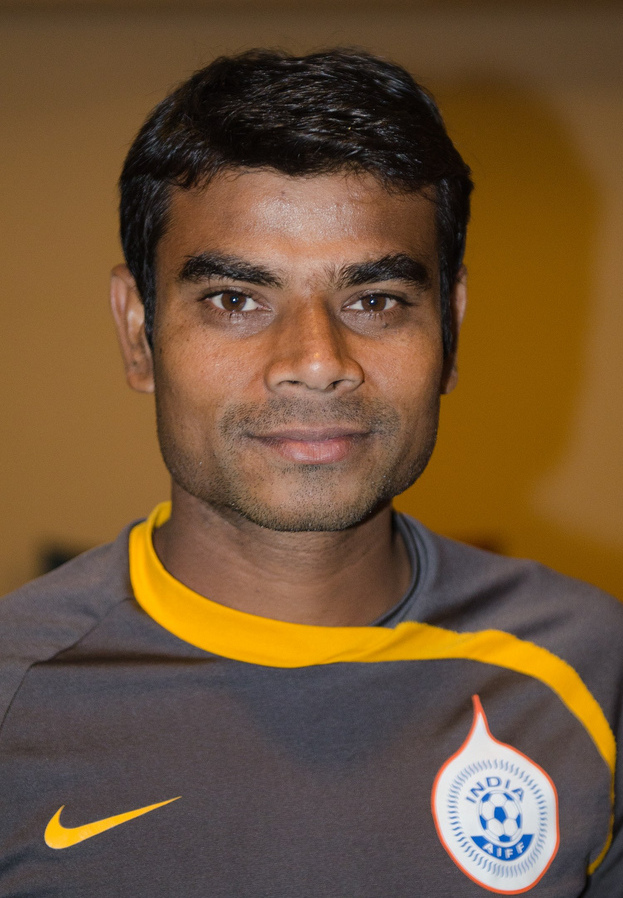
Deepak Mondal began his domestic career with JCT; He represented the club in NFL from 1998 to 2000.

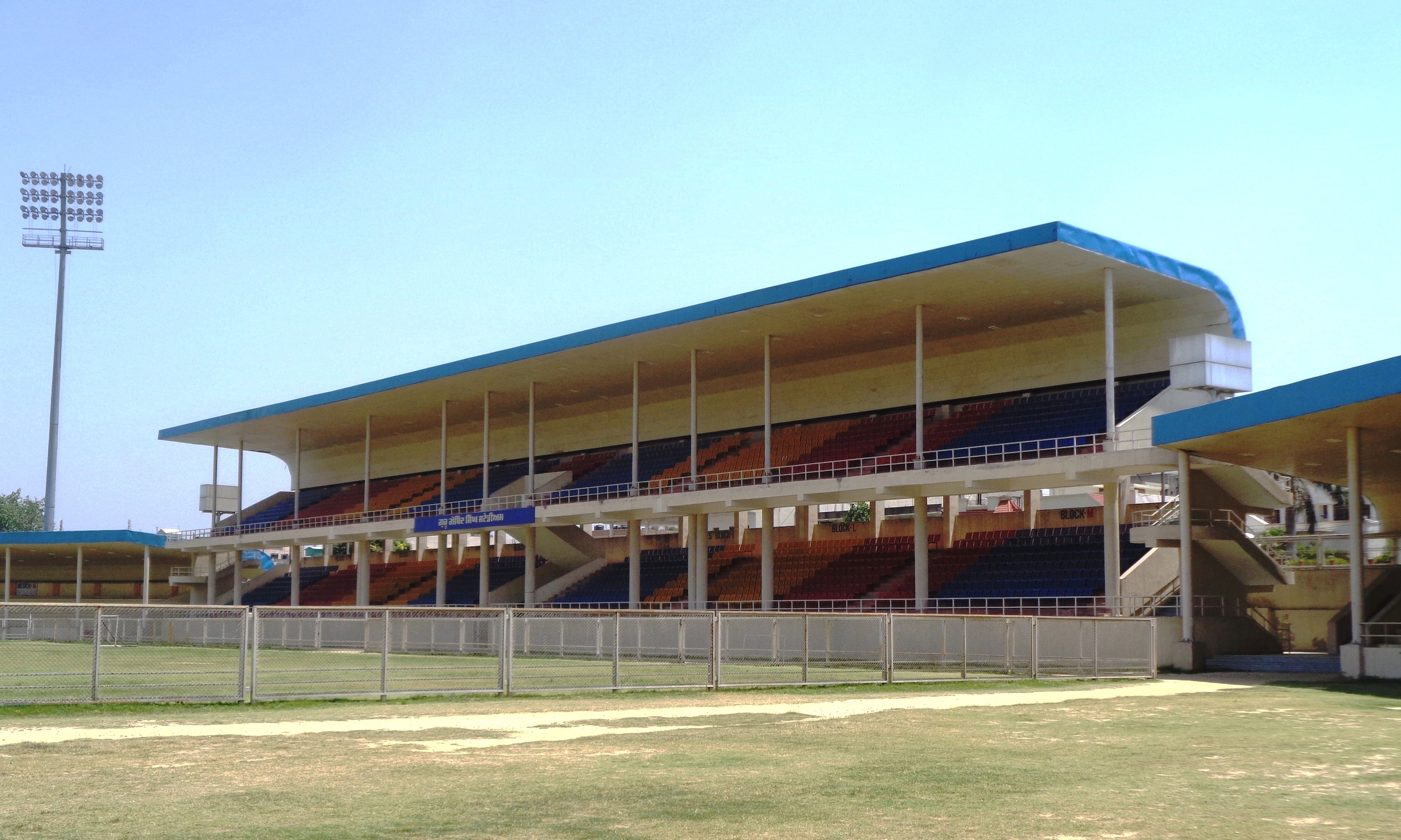
Guru Gobind Singh Stadium, also used for some home matches of JCT Mills FC

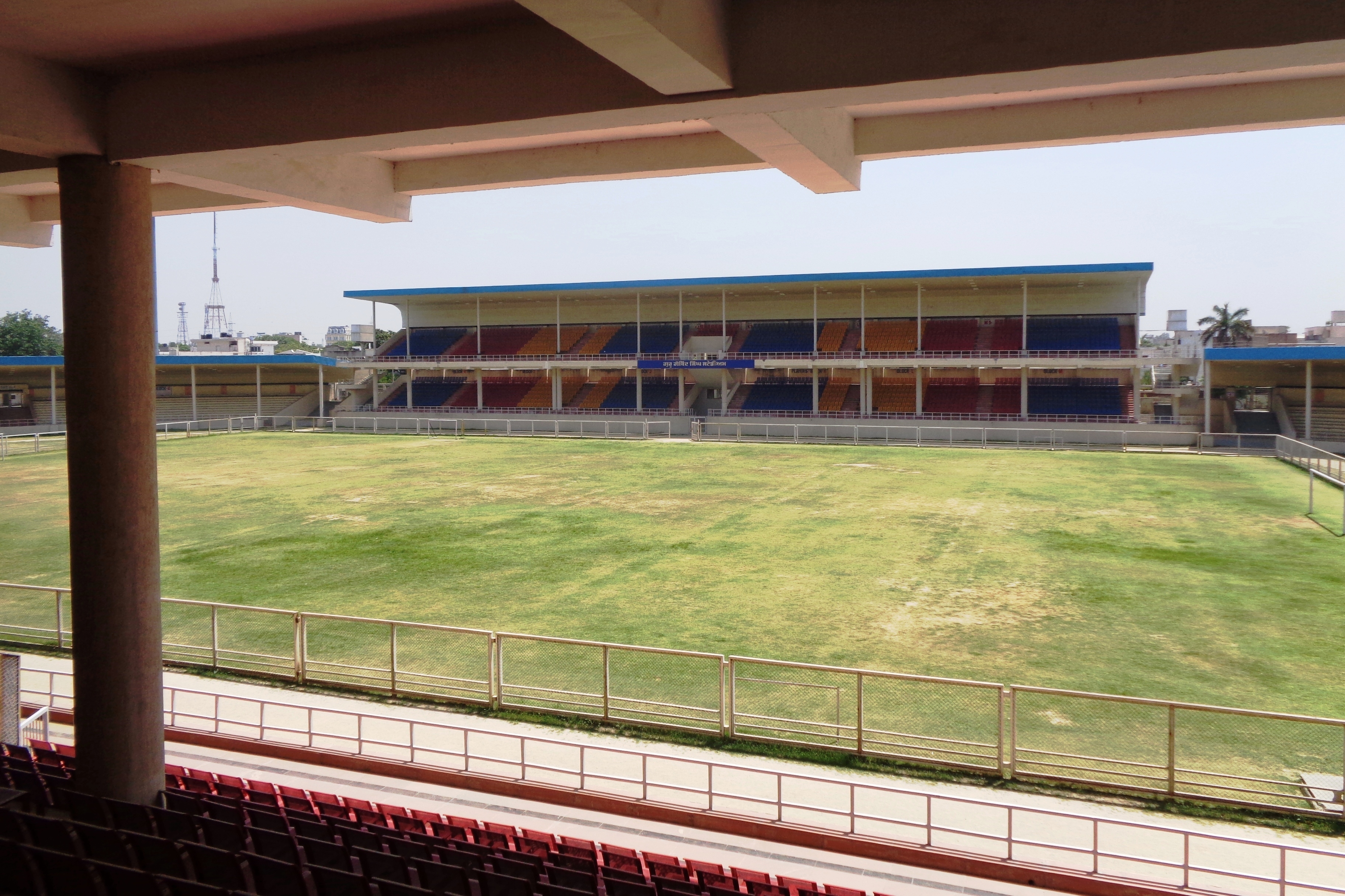
A view of Guru Gobind Singh Stadium

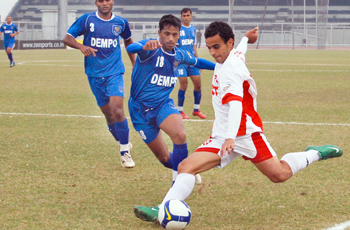
Baljit Saini of JCT (in white and red) against Dempo during the 2008–09 I-League at Guru Nanak Stadium.

== See also ==
- List of football clubs in India
- Defunct football clubs in India
