= Gurdev Singh Gill (footballer) =

Indian footballer

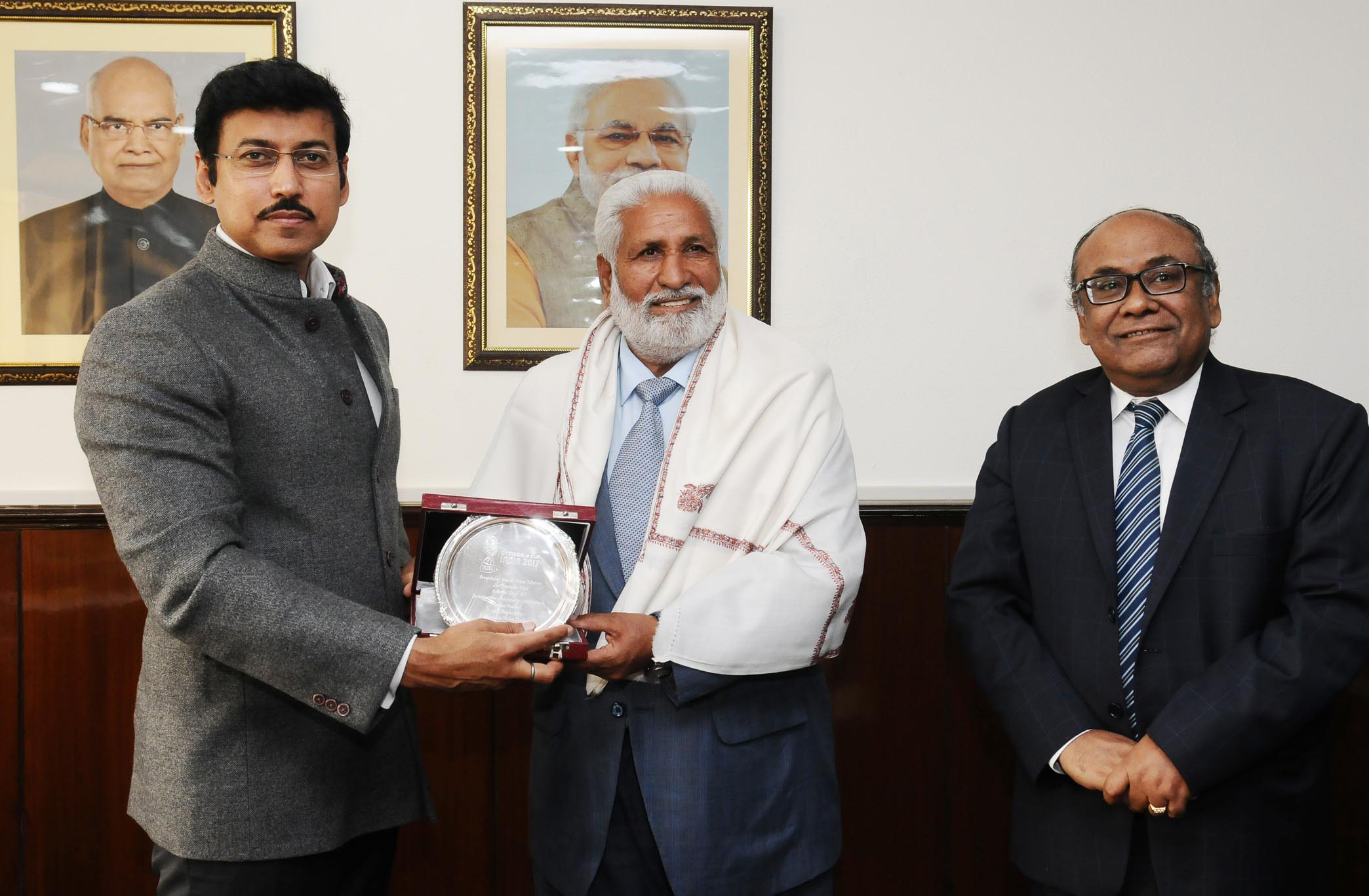
- Singh Gill being felicitated in New Delhi.by the Minister of State for Youth Affairs and Sports and Information & Broadcasting, Col. Rajyavardhan Singh Rathore

Personal information
- Date of birth: 20 April 1950 (age 76)
- Place of birth: Kharar Acharwal, Punjab, India
- Height: 1.73 m (5 ft 8 in)
- Position: Defender

Senior career*
Years	Team	Apps	(Gls)
1970–1973	Leaders Club, Jalandhar		
1974–1990	FC Punjab Police		
1978	East Bengal Club		
1979–1990	FC Punjab Police		

International career
1970–1979	India		
- * Club domestic league appearances and goals

Gurdev Singh Gill is a former Indian football player. He hails from Punjab. He was honoured with Arjuna Award, the highest sports award in India in the year 1978 for his achievements as a football player.

He is one of the three Punjabi football players to have received this prestigious award. He retired as a Commandant from Punjab Police in 2008. Settled now in Jalandhar and occasionally in Canada.

== Club career ==
- Leaders Football Club, Jalandhar : 1970 to 1973
- Punjab Police Football Club, Jalandhar : 1974 to 1990
- East Bengal Football Club Calcutta : 1978

== Early career ==
- Played for Rajput High School, Village Binjon, District. Hoshiarpur.
- Graduated from Guru Gobind Singh Khalsa College, Mahilpur.
- Represented Indian Football team while studying at SGGS Khalsa College, Mahilpur.

== Professional career ==
- Played for Leaders Football Club, Jalandhar : 1970 to 1973
- Joined Punjab Police : 1974
- Played for Punjab Police Football team : 1974 to 1990
- Played for East Bengal Football Club, Calcutta : 1978
- Coach Punjab Police Football team : 1990 to 2000
- Coach Indian Police Football team at World police games, Nepal : 2001 (bronze medal)
- Santosh Trophy : 1970 Punjab won it
- Santosh Trophy held at Jalandhar : 1974 Punjab beat Bengal 6–0 in the finals (record still holds till today)
- Retired as Superintendent of Police, Punjab Police : 2008

== International career ==
- Asia Cup : 1970
- Asian Games Tehran, Iran : 1974
- Asian Games Bangkok, Thailand : 1978 (Captain)
- Agha Khan Gold Cup, Indonesia : 1977 (hattrick against Bangladesh)
- Kings Cup, Seoul, South Korea (goal against South Korea, 45 yards)
- Meddreka Soccer, D'jakarta : 1976
- World Police Games, Nepal : 2001 (Coach) : bronze medal
- Afghan Jashan Celebration tournament, Kabul : 1975
- Pre-olympics in Rangoon, Burma : 1972
- President Gold Cup, Singapore : 1976

== Life outside football ==
- He retired as a Commandant of Police from Punjab Police in 2008.
- Served as Sports Secretary of Punjab Police from 2000–2004.
- Coached Punjab Police Football team that won All India Police Games between 2000–2006.
- Member Punjab Football Association Selection Committee.
- Organises a big Football tournament at his village Kharar Achharwal, every year.

=== Honours ===
- Recipient of Arjuna Award : 1978
- Recipient of Maharaja Ranjit Singh Award : 1984
- Recipient of President Police Medal for Meritorious Service : 2000
- Footballer of the Millennium by Delhi Sports Journalists' Association : 2000
