= Punjab State Super League =

Indian regional association football league in the state of Punjab

- Organising body: Punjab Football Association
- Founded: 1986; 40 years ago
- Country: India
- Number of clubs: 8
- Level on pyramid: 5
- Promotion to: I-League 3
- Relegation to: Punjab Second Division
- Current champions: Punjab FC (2nd title)
- Most championships: JCT (9 titles)
- Broadcaster: YouTube (live streaming)
- Current: 2026–27

The Punjab State Super League (simply known as the Punjab Super League or the JCT Punjab Super League) is an Indian top state-level regional football league in the state of Punjab. The league serves as the top football league in the state of Punjab and is sanctioned by Punjab Football Association. The league has been long-sponsored by the JCT Limited.

== History ==
The Punjab State Super Football League was started in 1986 by the Punjab Football Association. However, during the early days the league was played as a knock-out tournament for at least one week, thus was not granted state league status by the All India Football Federation till 2001. In 2001, the Punjab Football Association reformed the league to make it more into a league which would be played on a home and away basis. This thus earned the league its "state league" status.

In 2014, the Punjab State Super Football League was relaunched with JCT Limited as the title sponsors. The league would also be played in a number of different cities to promote grassroots football and prize money would be given out to provide an incentive for teams participating.

== Competition structure ==
The Punjab football structure is based on two state level leagues, followed by the district leagues.

| Tier | Division |
|---|---|
| I _{(5 on Indian Football pyramid)} | Punjab State Super Football League |
| II _{(6 on Indian Football pyramid)} | Punjab Second Division |
| III _{(7 on Indian Football pyramid)} | Punjab Third Division |

== Champions ==
The list of Super League champions:

| Season | Champion |
|---|---|
| 1985–86 | BSF |
| 1987 | JCT |
| 1988 | BSF |
| 1989 | Punjab State Electricity Board |
| 1990–91 | JCT |
| 1991 | JCT |
| 1992–93 | Punjab State Electricity Board |
| 1993 | League not held |
| 1994–95 | Punjab Police |
| 1995 | JCT |
| 1996 | League not held |
| 1998 | Punjab State Electricity Board |
| 1999 | Rail Coach Factory |
| 2000–01 | BSF |
| 2001 | League not held |
| 2002 | JCT |
| 2003 | JCT |
| 2004 | JCT |
| 2005 | JCT |
| 2006 | JCT |
| 2007 | Rail Coach Factory |
| 2008 | BSF |
| 2016 | Rail Coach Factory |
| 2018 | Minerva Punjab |
| 2019 | Minerva Punjab |
| 2020–21 | Punjab Police |
| 2021–22 | BSF |
| 2022–23 | RoundGlass Punjab |
| 2023–24 | Namdhari FC |
| 2024–25 | Namdhari FC |
| 2025–26 | Punjab FC |
| 2026-27 | Punjab FC |
