= Surjit Singh Randhawa =

Indian field hockey player (1951–1984)

Surjit Singh
Personal information
- Born: 10 October 1951 Wala, Batala, Gurdaspur, Punjab, India
- Died: 6 January 1984 (aged 32) Kartarpur, Jalandhar, Punjab, India
- Height: 5 ft 11 in (180 cm)
Medal record
Men's field hockey
Representing India
Hockey World Cup
Silver medal – second place	1973 Amsterdam	Team
Gold medal – first place	1975 Kuala Lumpur	Team
Asian Games
Silver medal – second place	1974 Tehran	Team
Silver medal – second place	1978 Bangkok	Team

Sardar Surjit Singh Randhawa (10 October 1951 – 6 January 1984) was an Indian field hockey player, who played for India men's national field hockey team at the 1976 Montreal Olympics. He was a full back and captain of India field hockey team. He got his training from DSP Ajit Singh Ahluwalia.

== Early life and education ==
Born in Batala, Punjab, Singh studied in Guru Nanak School, Batala, and later at Lyallpur Khalsa College at Jalandhar, where he started playing university level hockey tournaments.

== Career ==
After finishing college he joined the Punjab Police Force for a few years. He made his debut in the second Hockey World Cup in Amsterdam in 1973. He also played for India in the Munich Olympics in 1972, the 1974 and 1978 Asian Games, the 1976 Montreal Olympics, the Asian Games in Bangkok in 1978, and the 1982 World Cup held at Bombay. He was also the part of the winning team in 1975 Hockey World Cup in Kuala Lumpur. He was the first to score for India in the 1975 World Cup. He was included in the World Hockey XI in 1973 and the All-Star Hockey XI the next year. He was also the top scorer-both in the Esanda International hockey Tournament at Perth in Australia and the 1978 Asian Games. In his career he was able to score 4 Olympic goals. Initially he worked briefly with Indian Railways and Indian Airlines and finally with Punjab Police.

== Personal life ==
His wife Chanchal Randhawa was also international field hockey player, who led India women's national field hockey team in the 1970s. His Son Sarbrinder Singh Randhawa was a world-level Lawn Tennis Player, who represented India in various international tournaments across the world. He is also an Asian Games Runners up which were held in Indonesia.

=== Death and legacy ===
Surjit Singh died in a car accident in 1984 near Kartarpur in Jalandhar district after his retirement from the game. The hockey stadium in Jalandhar, the Surjit Hockey Stadium, is named after him. In 2000, with the persistent efforts of Surjit Singh's family, the ancestral village of Surit Singh was renamed after him. Initially it was called "Dakhla", but now it is known as "Surjit Singh Wala".

A hockey academy named after him is also being run by the Government of Punjab. In 1984, after his death, the Surjit Hockey Society was established in Jalandhar, and it organizes the annual Surjit Memorial Hockey Tournament in Jalandhar, every year, In 2007, with the efforts of Surjit Singh's family, a statue was installed in Batala to commemorate the legendary hockey player.

In 2012, in an effort to revive the sport in the state, Government of Punjab announced its decision to support the society. He was posthumously awarded the Arjuna Award in 1998.
