= Punjab Police FC =

Indian multi-sports club based in Punjab

Punjab Police
- Full name: Punjab Police Football Club
- Nickname: The Policemen
- Short name: PPFC
- Founded: 1960; 66 years ago
- Ground: Guru Gobind Singh Stadium
- Capacity: 22,000
- Owner: Punjab Police
- Head coach: Paramjit Singh
- League: Punjab State Super Football League
Home colours	Away colours

Punjab Police Football Club (formerly Punjab Police Club; nicknamed "The Policemen") is an Indian institutional multi-sports club based in Jalandhar, Punjab. Affiliated with the Punjab Football Association, club's football section competes in the Punjab State Super Football League.

Punjab Police previously participated in National Football League, which was then highest division of Indian football league system.

== History ==
Punjab Police FC, governed by the Punjab Police, have produced talented players who represented the India national football team. The club in 1965, reached final of India's oldest football tournament, Durand Cup, but went down 2–0 to Jarnail Singh led Mohun Bagan.

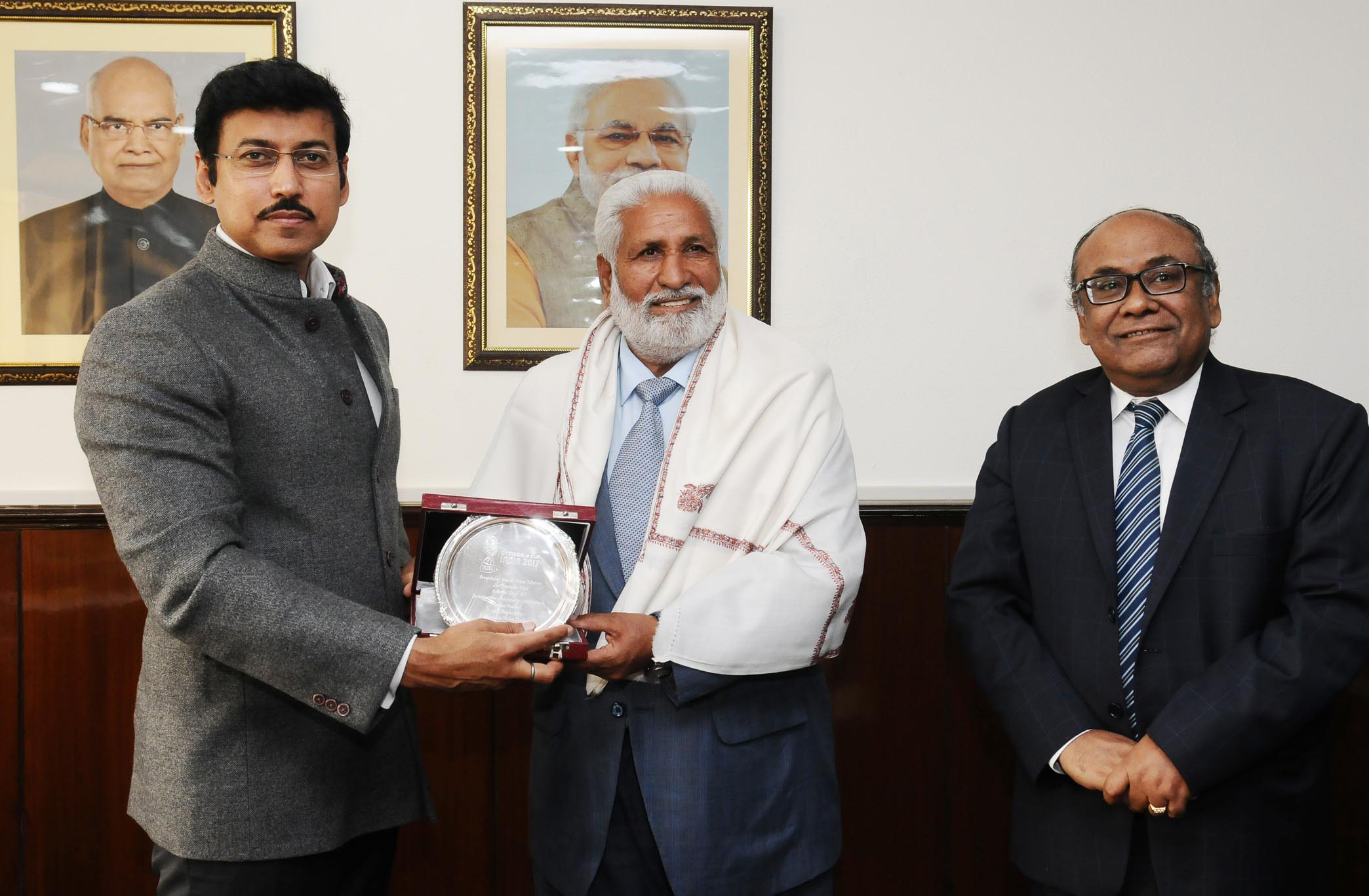
Gurdev Singh Gill, who represented Punjab Police FC for two brief spells in the 1970s, 80s and 90s, being felicitated by the Minister of State for Youth Affairs and Sports (IC) and Information & Broadcasting, Col. Rajyavardhan Singh Rathore in New Delhi.

They have won lot of regional and state tournaments. Their first win was the Sait Nagjee Football Tournament in 1962 and most recent win was the Delhi Lt. Governor's Cup in 2006. However, the club's most cherishable win was the 1994–95 Punjab State Super Football League. Legendary footballer Gurdev Singh managed the club briefly from 1985 to 1995. In 2001–02 NFL season, the club finished in twelfth place and relegated to the NFL II. In 2003 and 2005, they emerged as runners-up of the Guru Gobind Singh Trophy. At the 56th Principal Harbhajan Singh Memorial All-India Cup in Mohali, in 2018, Punjab Police reached semi-finals. In 2019 Punjab State Super League, the club faced Minerva Punjab in final, but lost the match 2(5)–2(4) in penalty-shootout.

In 2021, Punjab Police participated in prestigious Birat Gold Cup of Nepal and entered into semifinals after 2–0 win against Machhindra. Later, they defeated Sankata Boys 1–0 in semi-final. In final on 17 April, the club suffered a 1–0 defeat to Nepal A.P.F. Club. The club lifted Punjab State Super Football League title in 2020–21 season. The club was featured in the 40th edition of the Sikkim Gold Cup in November 2024.

== Rivalries ==
FC Punjab Police shared a rivalry with local side JCT Mills FC, which have emerged as the champions of the first ever National Football League. Both the clubs have witnessed the rivalry in regional tournaments of Punjab.

Punjab Police also enjoyed rivalries with two other local sides, Leaders Club Jalandhar and Border Security Force. In the 1960s nd 70s, the club shared fierce rivalry with Mohammedan Sporting of Kolkata.

== Stadium ==
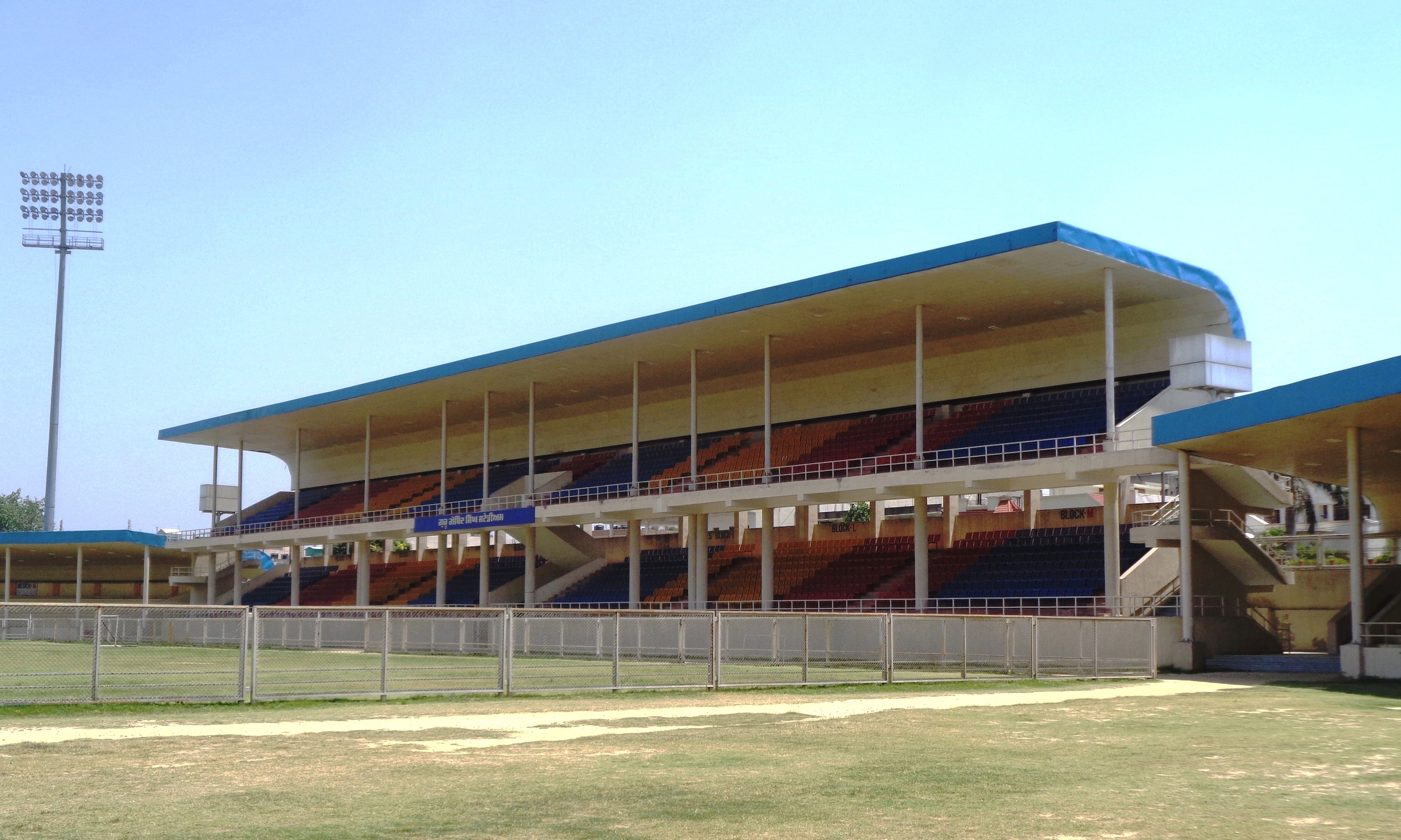
Guru Gobind Singh Stadium is used for home matches of FC Punjab Police

Punjab Police have used Guru Gobind Singh Stadium in Jalandhar for their seasonal home matches of the National Football League and Punjab State Super Football League.

== Honours ==
=== International ===
- (Nepal) Birat Gold Cup
  - Runners-up (1): 2021

=== Domestic ===
League

- Punjab State Super League
  - Champions (3): 1994–95, 2018–19, 2020–21
  - Runners-up (7): 1989, 1991, 1995, 1998, 2000–01, 2019, 2022–23
  - Third place (1): 2007
- National Football League II
  - Runners-up (1): 2000–01

Cup

- Durand Cup
  - Runners-up (2): 1965, 1979
- IFA Shield
  - Runners-up (1): 1987
- Punjab State Senior Championship
  - Champions (1): 1985
  - Runners-up (3): 1978–79, 1979–80, 1983–84
- Gurdarshan Memorial Cup
  - Champions (8): 1978, 1979, 1980, 1981, 1983, 1984, 1989, 2004
- Hot Weather Football Championship
  - Champions (4): 1998, 1999, 2002, 2003
  - Runners-up (2): 1997, 2019
- DCM Trophy
  - Champions (2): 1966, 1976
- Sikkim Governor's Gold Cup
  - Champions (3): 1982, 1983, 1995
- Delhi Lt. Governor's Cup
  - Champions (2): 2004, 2006
- Shaheed-e-Azam Sardar Bhagat Singh Memorial Trophy
  - Champions (3): 1999, 2001, 2004
  - Runners-up (2): 2000, 2003
- Sait Nagjee Football Tournament
  - Champions (1): 1962
- Bordoloi Trophy
  - Champions (1): 1994
- B. N. Mullick Police Cup
  - Champions (1): 1998
  - Runners-up (4): 2002, 2003–04, 2004–05, 2012
- Manjit Memorial Football Tournament
  - Champions (1): 2000
- Jarnail Singh Memorial Football Trophy
  - Champions (1): 2003
- Rajiv Gandhi Memorial Trophy
  - Champions (1): 2003
- Kohima Royal Gold Cup
  - Champions (1): 2001
  - Runners-up (1): 2002
- Harbhajan Singh Memorial Trophy
  - Champions (1): 2004
  - Runners-up (1): 2005
- Guru Gobind Singh Trophy
  - Runners-up (2): 2003, 2005
- Independence Day Cup
  - Runners-up (1): 1988
- Mohan Kumar Mangalam Football Tournament
  - Champions (3): 1991, 1998, 1999
  - Runners-up (2): 1993, 1997
- Nehru Club Cup
  - Runners-up (1): 1985

== Team records ==
=== Notable wins against foreign teams ===
Competition	Round	Year	Opposition	Score	Venue	City	Ref
DCM Trophy	Group stage	1974	(South Korea) Chocheung Bank	1–0	Ambedkar Stadium	New Delhi	
Sikkim Governor's Gold Cup	Pre quarter-final	2007	(Bangladesh) Chittagong FPWA	0–0 (4–3 p)	Paljor Stadium	Gangtok	
Birat Gold Cup	Pre quarter-final	2021	(Nepal) Gorkha Boys Rupandehi	1–1 (4–2 p)	Sahid Rangasala	Biratnagar	
Birat Gold Cup	Quarter-final	2021	(Nepal) Machhindra	2–0	Sahid Rangasala	Biratnagar	
Birat Gold Cup	Semi-final	2021	(Nepal) Sankata B.S.C.	1–0	Sahid Rangasala	Biratnagar	

== Other departments ==
=== Field hockey ===
Punjab Police has its hockey team, that participated in Beighton Cup, one of the oldest field hockey tournaments in the world. They also participated in Bombay Gold Cup. One of club's notable players is Baljit Singh Dhillon, who represented India at the numerous editions of the Summer Olympics.

Honours

- Beighton Cup
  - Champions (4): 1966, 1997, 2002, 2008
  - Runners-up (1): 1961
- Bombay Gold Cup
  - Champions (5): 1959, 1963, 1979, 1988, 1999
  - Runners-up (2): 1962, 1978
- Guru Tegh Bahadur Gold Cup
  - Runners-up (1): 1984
- Surjit Memorial Hockey Tournament
  - Champions (6): 1985, 1986, 1995, 1997, 2000, 2017
  - Runners-up (4): 1993, 1996, 2001, 2004
- Senior Nehru Hockey Tournament
  - Champions (7): 1976, 1980, 1982, 1994, 2002, 2003, 2004
  - Runners-up (6): 1975, 1978, 1985, 1986, 1996, 2019
- Aga Khan Gold Cup
  - Champions (2): 1955, 1960
  - Runners-up (1): 1951
- All India Police Hockey Championship
  - Champions (1): 2023, 2024

=== Basketball ===
Punjab Police operates both men's and women's basketball teams, which clinched Punjab State Annual Basketball League titles in multiple occasions.

Honours

- Federation Cup Basketball Championship
  - Champions (1): 2019
- Punjab State Annual Basketball League
  - Champions (2): 2004, 2005
- All India Police Games – Basketball Cluster
  - Champions (1): 2022
- All-India Balkar Singh Cheema Memorial Basketball Championship
  - Champions (1): 2022–23

=== Volleyball ===
Punjab Police operates a men's volleyball team, that competes in All India Federation Cup Volleyball Championship.

Honours

- Chand Agarwala Memorial National Volleyball Championship
  - Champions (1): 2003
- All-India Invitational Volleyball Championship
  - Champions (1): 2018
- All India National Volleyball Championship
  - Champions (1): 2019
- Mansoorpur National Volleyball Tournament
  - Champions (1): 2021

=== Futsal ===
Punjab Police has a men's futsal section, with having teams competing in regional tournaments including Punjab Futsal Club Championship.

Honours

- Punjab Futsal Club Championship
  - Runners-up (2): 2023, 2024

== See also ==
- List of football clubs in India
- Indian football clubs in Asian competitions
- Army Red
- Army Green
- Indian Air Force
- Indian Navy
- Services football team
- Railways football team
- Assam Rifles
- Central Reserve Police Force SC
- BSF FT
- CISF Protectors football team
