= Border Security Force Sporting Club =

Indian association football club

Border Security Force
- Full name: Border Security Force Sporting Club
- Ground: Guru Gobind Singh Stadium
- Capacity: 22,000
- Owner: Border Security Force
- League: Punjab State Super Football League
Home colours	Away colours

Border Security Force Sporting Club is an Indian multi-sports club, best known for its football section. The club is based in Jalandhar, Punjab, and currently competing in the Punjab State Super Football League. They have been regular competitors in the Durand Cup and Independence Day Cup of Assam.

BSF's corporate team competed in All India Public Sector tournament.

== History ==
The team won the Durand Cup on seven occasions during the 1960s, 1970s, and 1980s. Sukhwinder Singh represented the club from 1974 to 1978. In June 1970, the All Nepal Football Association organized a tournament to celebrate the 50th birth anniversary of King Mahendra, where the team ultimately lost 2–0 to the East Pakistan football team in the title-deciding game, which was held in a round-robin league format. They later tied the second-place game with Mahabir Club, finishing as joint runners-up.

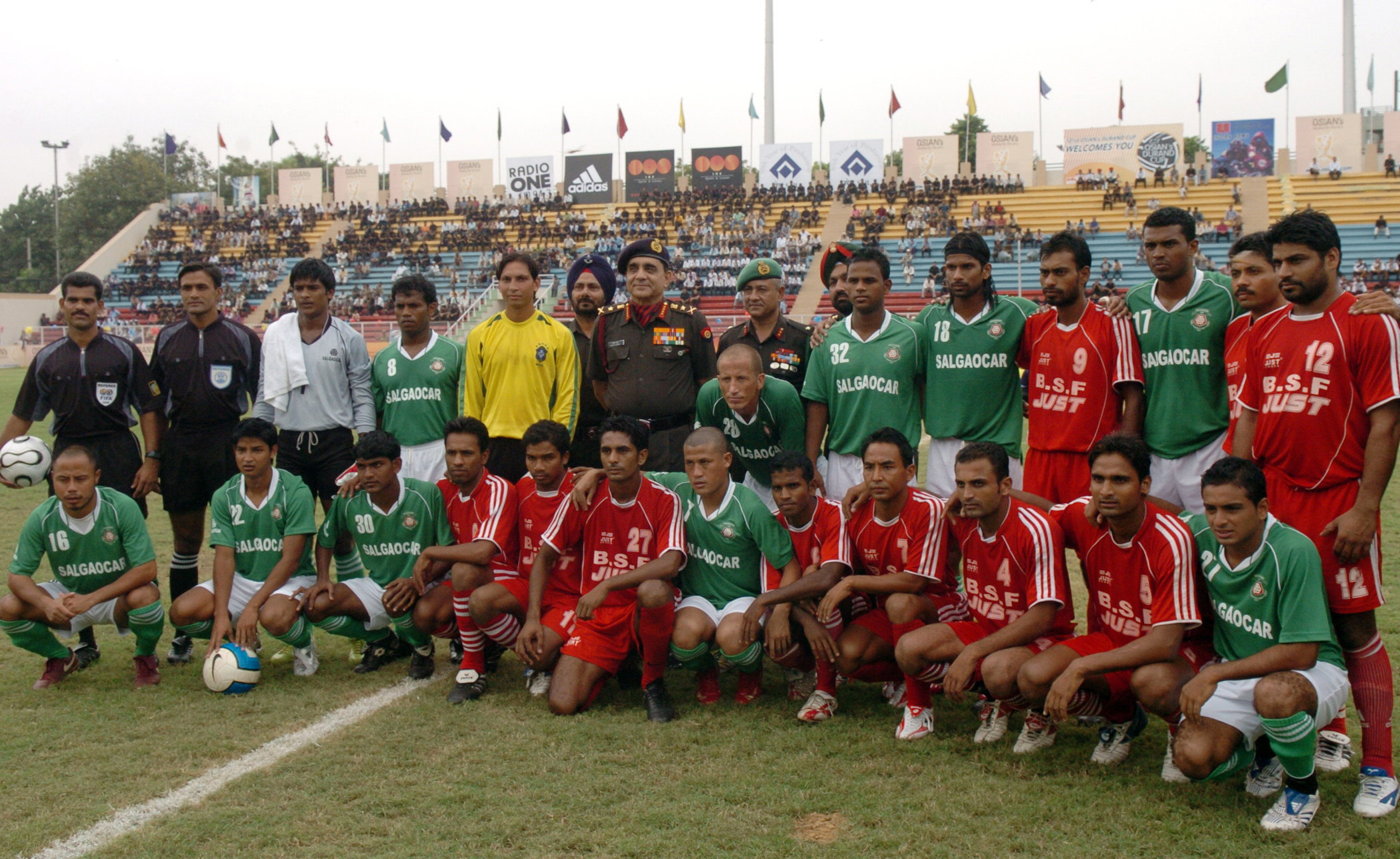
BSF players (in red) during the Durand Cup at the Ambedkar Stadium in 2008.

The team also spent one season in the old National Football League during the 1999–2000 season. They were relegated after finishing in 11th place.

== Rivalries ==
As a club from the state of Punjab, Border Security Force nurtured rivalries with numerous local sides including Leaders Club, Punjab Police, JCT Mills, in the state leagues.

== Honours ==
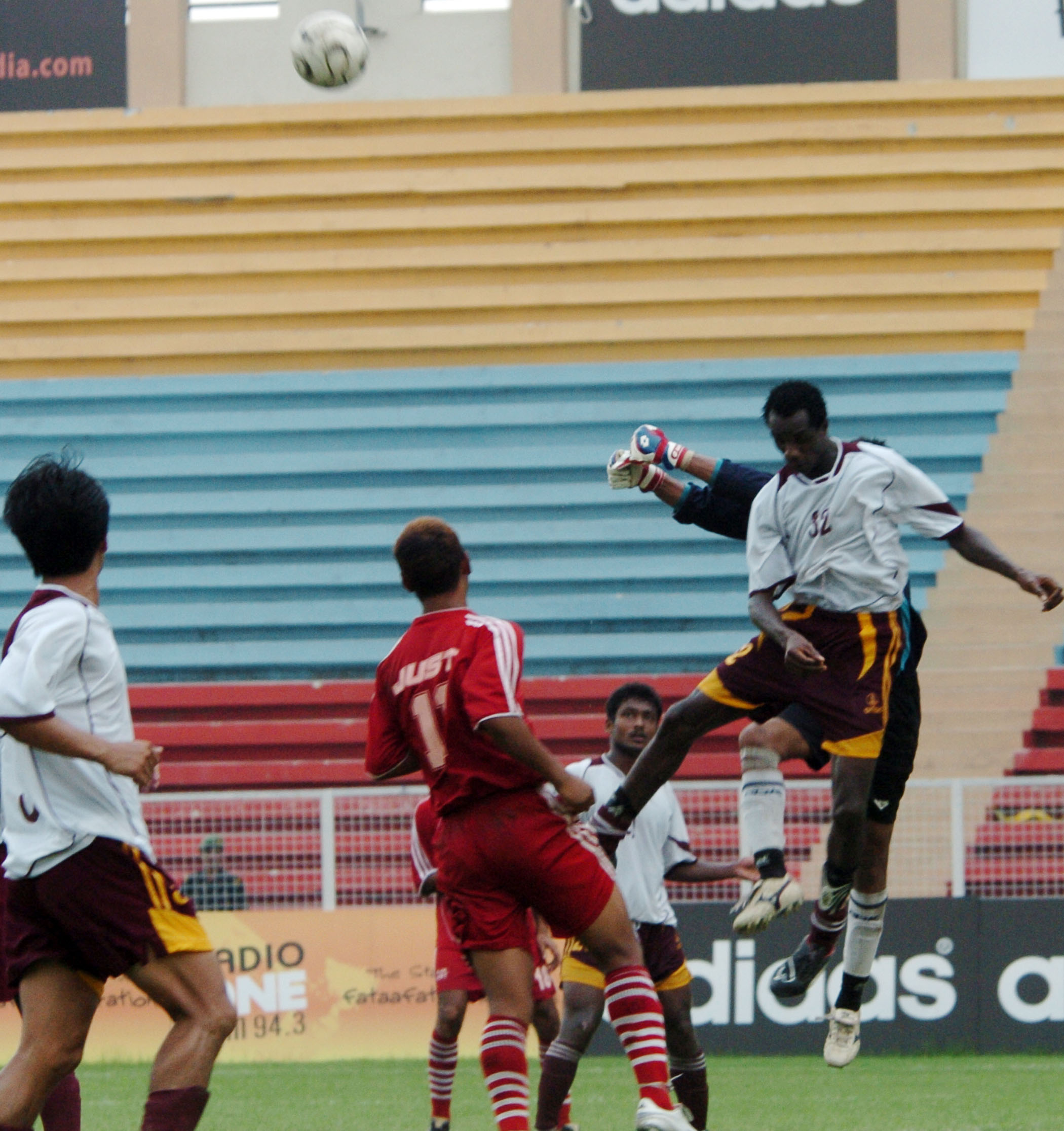
BSF players (in red) in action against ONGC FC in 2008 Durand Cup at Ambedkar Stadium in New Delhi.

=== League ===
- National Football League II
  - Champions (1): 1998–99
- Punjab State Super Football League
  - Champions (5): 1985–86, 1988, 2000–01, 2008, 2021–22
  - Runners-up (6): 1990–91, 1994–95, 2002, 2004, 2005, 2006

=== Cup ===
- Durand Cup
  - Champions (7): 1968–69, 1971–72, 1973–74, 1975–76, 1976, 1981, 1988
- Federation Cup
  - Champions (1): 1979–80
  - Runners-up (1): 1988–89
- Punjab State Senior Championship
  - Champions (2): 1978–79, 1983–84
  - Runners-up (4): 1977, 1981, 1982, 1989
- Sait Nagjee Football Tournament
  - Champions (1): 1970
- King Mahendra Cup
  - Runners-up (1): 1970
- All Airlines Gold Cup
  - Champions (3): 1994, 1997, 1998–99
- Sikkim Governor's Gold Cup
  - Champions (3): 2002, 2005, 2012
- Independence Day Cup
  - Champions (6): 1993, 1998, 1999, 2006, 2008–09, 2018
  - Runners-up (3): 2007, 2016, 2019
- Gurdarshan Memorial Cup
  - Champions (4): 1986, 1994, 1998, 1981, 2005
- B. N. Mullick Police Cup
  - Champions (5): 2001, 2002, 2003–04, 2004–05, 2008
  - Runners-up (1): 1998
- Mammen Mappillai Trophy
  - Champions (1): 1976 (co-winners)
- Churachand Singh Trophy
  - Champions (1): 1985
- Darjeeling Gold Cup
  - Champions (1): 1980
- Mohan Kumar Mangalam Football Tournament
  - Champions (6): 1993, 1996, 1997, 2002, 2003, 2004
  - Runners-up (1): 1999
- Shaheed-e-Azam Sardar Bhagat Singh Memorial Trophy
  - Champions (3): 2003, 2004, 2005
  - Runners-up (1): 2001
- Guru Gobind Singh Trophy
  - Champions (1): 2005
- Bandodkar Gold Trophy
  - Runners-up (1): 1986
- Delhi Lt. Governor's Cup
  - Runners-up (1): 2004
- Steel Express Cup
  - Runners-up (1): 2018

== Other departments ==
=== Field hockey ===
Border Security Force has a field hockey team that participated in Beighton Cup, one of the oldest field hockey tournaments in the world. They also appeared in Bombay Gold Cup.

Honours

- Beighton Cup
  - Champions (5): 1971, 1996, 1998, 2003, 2005
  - Runners-up (4): 1997, 2001, 2006, 2007
- Bombay Gold Cup
  - Champions (8): 1968, 1969, 1970, 1973, 1974, 1980, 1981, 1992
- Guru Tegh Bahadur Gold Cup
  - Champions (1): 2000
- Surjit Memorial Hockey Tournament
  - Champions (2): 1998, 1999
  - Runners-up (4): 1986, 1988, 1989, 2003
- Senior Nehru Hockey Tournament
  - Champions (7): 1975, 1977, 1978, 1981, 1987, 1996, 1996
  - Runners-up (6): 1979, 1984, 1992, 1993, 1999, 2004
- All India Police Hockey Championship
  - Runners-up (1): 2024

=== Basketball ===
BSF has been operating both men's and women's basketball teams, and competing in Punjab State Annual Basketball League.

Honours

- Punjab State Annual Basketball League
  - Runners-up (1): 2005

== See also ==
- List of football clubs in India
- Army Red
- Army Green
- Indian Air Force
- Indian Navy
- Services football team
- Railways football team
- Assam Rifles
- Central Reserve Police Force
- Punjab Police FC
- CISF Protectors football team
