= G. F. Vernon's cricket team in Ceylon and India in 1889–90 =

English international cricket tour

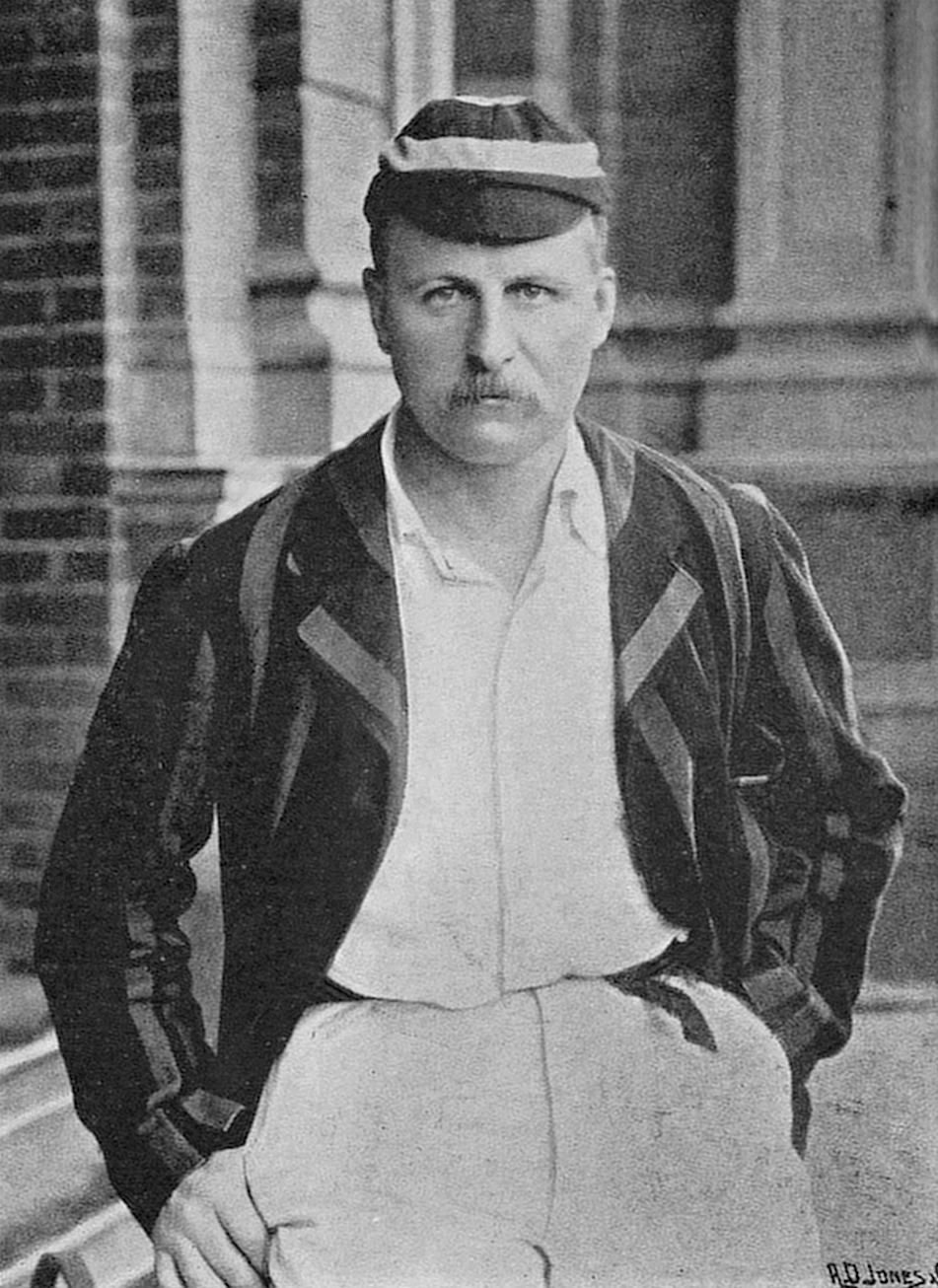
George Vernon

In the 1889–90 cricket season, an English team managed by George Vernon and captained by Lord Hawke toured Ceylon and India. It was a pioneering tour being the first visit by an English team to India and the second to Ceylon, following the stopover by Ivo Bligh's team to Australia in 1882–83. Vernon's team, known as G. F. Vernon's XI, was entirely composed of players with amateur status and, in the absence of professionals, none of its matches have been recognised as first-class. (Note: At the time, "first-class" was a term in common usage but it was not yet an official standard. It was formally defined in the May 1894 meeting at Lord's of Marylebone Cricket Club (MCC) and the county clubs which were then competing in the County Championship. The ruling was effective from the beginning of the 1895 season.) In all, they played thirteen matches from 28 November 1889 to 1 March 1890, starting with two games in Ceylon before moving on to Calcutta where the Indian part of the tour began in late December.

Of the thirteen matches, Vernon's XI won ten (six by over an innings) and drew two. They were defeated only once, by the Parsis in a match which had great significance for the native communities living under the rule of the British Raj. The matches were all played under the Laws of Cricket which prevailed in England at the time, including the compulsory follow-on and the recently introduced 5-ball over. (Note: At the time, the number of deliveries per over in English cricket had just been increased from four to five; all the matches on this tour used the five-ball over (the over was increased from five deliveries to six in 1900). Since 1854, it had been compulsory for the team batting second to follow-on if they had a first innings deficit of 80 or more runs (the minimum deficit was increased to 120 runs in 1894 and the follow-on first became optional in 1900).) The tour was a success and it made a significant contribution to the growth and development of cricket in the sub-continent.

== Preparations ==
In the 21 March 1889 issue of Cricket: A Weekly Record of the Game (aka Cricket), the news section includes a piece about "the probable visit of a party of English amateurs to India at the fall of this year". Arrangements were reported to be "progressing most satisfactorily" with contacts in Calcutta saying the idea of the tour "seems to be universally popular throughout India". The team was expected to set sail end of October and spend Christmas in Calcutta. Lord Hawke and G. F. Vernon were the main organisers in England, and they had thus far extended invitations to J. G. Walker, Albert Leatham, J. H. J. Hornsby, H. E. Rhodes, Edward Beaumont-Nesbitt, F. L. Shand and H. W. Forster.

In the 11 July issue, the news editor confirmed that the party would sail on the P&O steamer Bengal which was scheduled to leave London for Colombo, Madras and Calcutta on 31 October. The planned schedule was to play two matches in Ceylon during the stopover at Colombo. Madras would only be a short stopover so the intention was to begin the Indian matches in Calcutta, where it was hoped they would spend Christmas week. No definite match arrangements could yet be confirmed, however, and they did not expect to finalise a fixture list until they arrived in India. They intended to terminate the tour around the end of February. Hawke and Vernon continued to organise things from England. They had received acceptances from Walker, Leatham, Hornsby, Rhodes and Shand, who were all mentioned in March; additional acceptances had been received from Hylton Philipson and E. M. Lawson-Smith. Beaumont-Nesbitt had apparently declined; Forster was said to have accepted but nevertheless did not make the trip. The organisers had also invited Francis Lacey, but his availability was uncertain and, eventually, he did not join the team.

Thomas Tapling

The arrangements seemed to be progressing well until the sudden death on 10 September of H. E. Rhodes, who fell from a hotel balcony in Dover. Cricket paid tribute to him on 31 October, the same day the team was due to depart. Most of the team met at Liverpool Street Station that day and travelled to Tilbury, to embark on the Bengal which had been lying off Gravesend. Those heading for Tilbury were Vernon, Walker, Lawson-Smith, Hornsby, Philipson and three recent recruits: Arthur Gibson, George Hone-Goldney, and Thomas Tapling. Two more, Ernest de Little and F. L. Shand would meet them in Colombo. Rhodes' replacement was A. N. Curzon who would join the team in January. Reserve wicket-keeper Tapling, who was both an eminent philatelist and the MP for Harborough, sailed on the Bengal as far as Naples where a close friend was taken ill. Tapling opted to stay with him, thereby missing the Ceylonese leg of the tour. He arrived in India just before Christmas 1889 and played in six matches between then and the end of February.

Also missing from the Bengal was Hawke who had left a week earlier and gone to Bombay, as he wanted to do some big-game hunting. This venture backfired somewhat because, while he was staying in Gwalior, he was struck down with a serious attack of gastritis. That not only stopped him from killing animals, but also from meeting his teammates in Calcutta, as he had planned. It was not until February, when nine of the thirteen matches had been played, that Hawke was able to rejoin the team.

Cricket reported on 28 November that the Bengal had docked in Colombo two days earlier, on schedule. The 27 December issue carried the first match report from the tour of the match in Kandy against "All Ceylon".

== Itinerary and results ==
Eden Gardens in 1861

The tour began in Kandy on 28 November 1889. The team played two matches in Ceylon and then moved on to India in December. Starting with the match against the Calcutta Cricket Club at Eden Gardens on 23 December, they played eleven matches in India to the end of February 1890.

The precise names and locations of some venues cannot now be established and many of the team names were arbitrarily derived from their locations. With the single exception of the Parsis, all the home teams were composed of European colonials who were mostly British expatriates.

The matches were scheduled for either two or three days' duration. The two-day matches are noted as such in the table below; the rest were all scheduled for three days. There was no Sunday play and all the matches were arranged so that they would be completed on consecutive days with no Sunday break.

Dates	Match	Venue	Result	Notes
28–30 Nov 1889	Ceylon v G. F. Vernon's XI	Bogambara Stadium, Kandy	Vernon's XI won by an innings and 77 runs	
6–7 Dec 1889	Colombo Cricket Club v G. F. Vernon's XI	Galle Face, Colombo	Vernon's XI won by an innings and 10 runs	2-day match
23–25 Dec 1889	Calcutta Cricket Club v G. F. Vernon's XI	Eden Gardens, Calcutta	Vernon's XI won by 9 wickets	
31 Dec–2 Jan 1890	Bengal v G. F. Vernon's XI	Eden Gardens, Calcutta	Vernon's XI won by an innings and 17 runs	
9–10 Jan 1890	Bihar Wanderers v G. F. Vernon's XI	Bankipore	Match drawn	2-day match
16–18 Jan 1890	North-West Frontier Province v G. F. Vernon's XI	Alfred Park, Allahabad	Vernon's XI won by 3 wickets	
20–22 Jan 1890	Northern India v G. F. Vernon's XI	Alfred Park, Allahabad	Vernon's XI won by 6 wickets	
27–28 Jan 1890	Bombay Gymkhana v G. F. Vernon's XI	Gymkhana Ground, Bombay	Vernon's XI won by an innings and 74 runs	2-day match
30–31 Jan 1890	Parsis v G. F. Vernon's XI	Gymkhana Ground, Bombay	Parsis won by 4 wickets	2-day match
6–7 Feb 1890	Lucknow v G. F. Vernon's XI	Lucknow	Vernon's XI won by 123 runs	2-day match
14–15 Feb 1890	Agra v G. F. Vernon's XI	Agra	Vernon's XI won by an innings and 66 runs	2-day match
21–22 Feb 1890	Northern India v G. F. Vernon's XI	Meerut	Match drawn	2-day match
27 Feb–1 Mar 1890	Punjab v G. F. Vernon's XI	Lahore	Vernon's XI won by an innings and 40 runs	

== Tour summary ==
=== Playing standards ===
Analysing the quality of Vernon's team, James Coldham in his biography of Hawke said they were a "useful" combination in that they had plenty of batting and most types of bowling. They had, too, a very good wicket-keeper because Philipson later played for England. Coldham saw them as what he called a mix of regular county players, Oxbridge types and "first-rate club players" who would have been a good Minor Counties team. They were by no means first-class but, of their time, a real handful for any Ceylonese or Indian opposition. Ramachandra Guha concurs with this view, saying that Vernon's XI "could not be judged a first-class side (although) they played cricket of a quality not generally seen in India".

The general weakness of the Indian and Ceylonese opposition is evident in the number of wide winning margins achieved by Vernon's XI, six of the ten wins by an innings and plenty. Twelve of their thirteen hosts had teams which comprised the typical combination of British expatriates who were mostly civil servants or soldiers. The expatriate XIs were no better than English local club teams and so, for the most part, they were easily beaten by Vernon's XI.

The tourists arrived in Bombay from Allahabad about a week before the end of January 1890. They had won six and drawn one of their seven matches. Among the individual highlights had been centuries by Vernon, Gibson and Walker; and strong bowling performances by Hornsby, Gibson, Leatham and de Little. Vernon's XI then easily disposed of the Bombay Gymkhana team by an innings, Hornsby taking 13/78 in the match. Their next match was also on the Gymkhana Grounds and it was advertised as the "Cricket Championship of India".

=== Parsis match ===
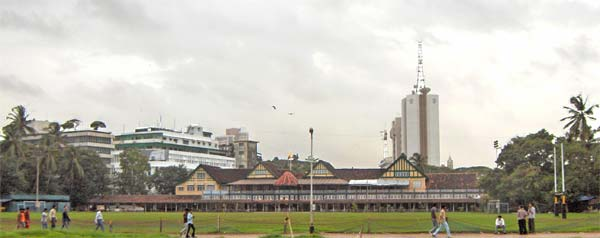
A modern view of the Bombay Gymkhana

The only match in which Vernon's team faced an ethnic team with no Europeans was the low-scoring one at the end of January against the Parsis on the Bombay Gymkhana. The Parsis had a distinct community in Bombay and, having embraced British rule and culture, they were the real pioneers of Indian cricket and had sent two touring teams to Great Britain, in 1886 and 1888. Until the last fifteen or so years of the 19th century, the sport in India had always been an essentially British pursuit. Its increasing popularity among the native population coincided with the rise of their influence in administrative and political matters. In 1890, as Coldham says, the Parsis were the only native community capable of putting a team in the field.

It was a two-day match, 30 and 31 January. At the end of the first day, the Parsis were 80/9 in response to the tourists' 97 all out, which included 45 by Vernon. The Parsis added two more runs in the morning and Vernon's XI began their second innings with a lead of 15. The best Parsi player was their all-rounder M. E. Pavri who was a fast bowler. He had been successful in England on the 1888 tour. He now dismissed Vernon's XI for only 61, taking 7/34. The Parsis needed 77 to claim a significant victory over their English opponents and, despite Hornsby's efforts, they accomplished it with four wickets to spare. Pavri took 9/37 in the match and also top-scored with 21 in the Parsi second innings. He played for Middlesex a few years later and was known as the "Grace of the Parsis" because, like W. G. Grace, he was both an all-rounder and a doctor.

There is no doubt that it was a significant victory because it sparked celebrations throughout Bombay and was acclaimed as "the greatest sporting contest in the city's history". Many saw it as "a blow to the prestige of Empire" and the pro-Raj Bombay Gazette resorted to making speculative excuses such as: "Had Mr Vernon not been run out". There was little if any actual trouble and efforts were made to jointly celebrate the occasion but, as Guha commented, "it revealed the communal competitiveness that would drive the progress of cricket in colonial India". The Bombay Gazette called for a resurgence of European cricket while the Parsi newspaper Rast Goftar asked their players to bear in mind that Hindu and Muslim cricketers would be seeking to emulate their success, so they must themselves be ready to face challenges.

Four weeks later, when Cricket published the match report and scorecard, the magazine paid a glowing tribute to the Parsis saying their victory "cannot fail to give a fresh impetus to the practice of the game among the followers of that great community". According to a separate report in the same issue of Cricket, there was a celebratory dinner for the tourists on the night of the 30th (after the first day of the match). On the night of the 31st, Vernon's team travelled to Lucknow on the Jubbulpore mail train. It was expected they would return to Bombay after playing the Punjab in Lahore at the end of February, and there would be a return match against the Parsis. That, however, did not happen as the Lahore match was the final one.

=== Later matches ===
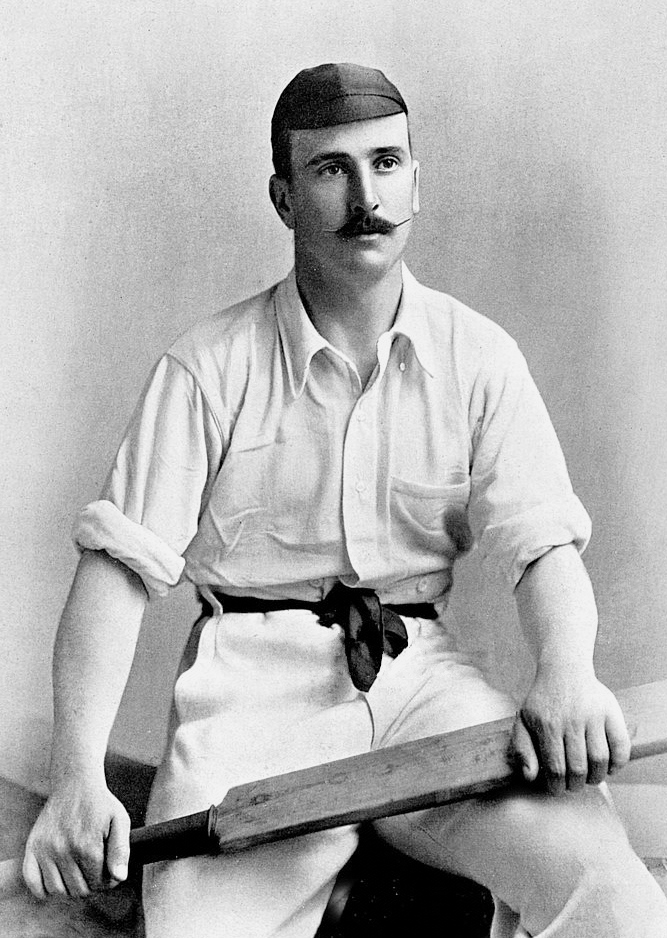
Walter Troup

When Vernon's XI arrived in Lucknow, their opponents were the usual British expatriate combination. The Lucknow team nevertheless gave Vernon's XI a real scare. It was Hawke's first match on the tour and he took over the captaincy from Vernon. Hawke opened the batting himself and was bowled for a duck. The team was all out for only 79 and Lucknow responded with 125 to lead by 46 on first innings. Hawke was nearly out straightaway in his second innings but the third man fielder dropped the catch. Hawke went on to make 45 and, with 68 by Walker and 47* by Philipson, Vernon's XI scored 229 to set Lucknow a target of 184. The pitch was very worn and they were bowled out by de Little and Gibson who took five wickets each, Vernon's XI winning by 123 runs.

Using the railways as their primary means of transport, the team moved on to Agra. Hone-Goldney, Hornsby and Vernon himself had all succumbed to illness or injury and three local replacements – Hilliard, John and Maxwell – had to be drafted in. Lawson-Smith rose to the occasion with a first innings century before de Little and Gibson bowled Agra out for two low totals. Apart from Gloucestershire batsman Walter Troup, the Agra team had little to offer and this was a routine win for Vernon's XI. Troup carried his bat though the Agra first innings with 59* in a total of 116.

In Meerut, the tourists again encountered Troup, this time playing for a team called Northern India. Vernon had recovered and his team totalled 304 in the first innings with seven batsmen making scores of between 23 and 54. Hoping for another convincing victory, Vernon's XI were frustrated by Troup (42) and John Waterfield (98), who forged a stubborn and time-consuming fourth wicket partnership. Although Northern India had to follow-on, there was not enough time left for the tourists to dismiss them again, and the match was drawn.

Soon afterwards, de Little broke a collarbone in a riding accident. The team had only eight fit players when they arrived in Lahore for the final match against a Punjab team; Vernon himself was again among the absentees. They recruited John Waterfield for this match along with Army officers Herman Bonham-Carter and Hugh Bateman-Champain. Vernon's XI won by an innings, the match and the tour ending on 1 March 1890.

The team's highest runscorers on the tour were Walker (515) and Vernon himself (478). Vernon's 128 in the opening match against Ceylon was the highest individual score; three other centuries were scored by Lawson-Smith (117), Walker (108) and Gibson (100). The leading bowlers by wickets taken were Hornsby (69), Gibson (67) and de Little (49).

== Aftermath ==
The tour was a success and it made a significant contribution to the growth and development of cricket in the sub-continent. On 27 March 1890, Cricket reproduced an article in India's Pioneer Mail which praised Vernon's XI for "setting on foot an enterprise now sure to be repeated". It would not be long before it was repeated as another touring party arrived in 1892, this time led by Hawke and including F. S. Jackson, the future England captain, and Ledger Hill. Gibson, Hornsby, Leatham, and Vernon all returned. Colynge Caple remarked that the tour had originated as "something in the nature of a pleasure trip" but in the end it forged "yet another link in the ever-growing chain of international cricket".

The Parsis had first played the European members of the Bombay Gymkhana in 1877. The Europeans won after the Parsis had surprisingly taken a first innings lead and the match was reiterated several times in the following years. The Parsis went to England twice in the 1880s and were all that time gaining expertise and experience. In the Gymkhana match of September 1889, the Parsis won by 10 wickets and then, four months later, came the celebrated victory over Vernon's XI. Mihir Bose likened the popular acclaim of the Parsi team to that of a people who had lost their country long ago and suddenly rediscovered themselves on a cricket field.

Two years later, the Parsis were playing their European counterparts in a match billed as the Bombay Presidency and generally accorded first-class status, the inaugural first-class match in India. Unfortunately, it was ruined by rain and resulted in a draw, but it meant the Parsis had arrived at cricket's highest level. In the years that followed, the cricketers among the Hindu and Muslim communities inevitably caught up and the Bombay Presidency Match became the Bombay Triangular in 1907 and the Bombay Quadrangular in 1912.

== Players ==
The list below includes all players who represented Vernon's XI in at least one of the thirteen matches. There was no formal squad selection process as for later Test teams and the players became involved as a result of receiving friendly invitations, or by being available when the team was short of numbers. Some players therefore had a very temporary association with the team at one or two locations only. The table gives the name, cricket club (if specific), age (i.e., on 1 November 1889) and on-field roles of each player:

Batsmen
Name	Club	Birth date	Batting style	Bowling style	Refs
Lord Hawke	Yorkshire	16 August 1860 (aged 29)	right-handed		
E. M. Lawson-Smith	Northumberland	3 November 1859 (aged 29)	right-handed		
George Vernon	Middlesex	20 June 1856 (aged 33)	right-handed	underarm slow (hand unknown)	
J. G. Walker	Middlesex	9 September 1859 (aged 30)	right-handed		

All-rounders
Name	Club	Birth date	Batting style	Bowling style	Refs
Arthur Gibson	Lancashire	15 June 1863 (aged 26)	right-handed	right arm medium pace	

Wicket-keepers
Name	Club	Birth date	Batting style	Bowling style	Refs
Hylton Philipson	Oxford University	8 June 1866 (aged 23)	right-handed		
Thomas Tapling	various teams	30 October 1855 (aged 34)	right-handed		

Bowlers
Name	Club	Birth date	Batting style	Bowling style	Refs
Ernest de Little	Cambridge University	19 June 1868 (aged 21)	right-handed	right arm fast	
George Hone-Goldney	various teams	24 January 1851 (aged 38)	right-handed	right arm medium pace	
John Hornsby	Middlesex	18 April 1860 (aged 29)	right-handed	slow left arm orthodox	
Albert Leatham	various teams	9 August 1859 (aged 30)	right-handed	left arm slow medium	
Francis Shand	various teams	23 June 1855 (aged 34)	left-handed	left arm fast	

Others
Name	Notes	Refs
Hugh Bateman-Champain	Bateman-Champain (1869–1933) played in eleven first-class matches for Gloucestershire, and one for MCC, between 1888 and 1902. He played for Vernon's XI against the Punjab. In later life, he was appointed secretary-general of the British Red Cross.	
Herman Bonham-Carter	Herman Bonham-Carter (1863–1945) was educated at Winchester College and the Royal Military Academy, Woolwich. He became an officer in the Royal Engineers and, from December 1888, he was in India at the Public Works Department (Traffic Department), managing railways. He had played cricket at the Academy and for the Royal Engineers team but never in any top-class matches. He joined Vernon's XI for their final match in Lahore. In 1891, he played for Marylebone Cricket Club against Hampshire but, again, that was not a top-class match.	
Hon. A. N. Curzon	The Honourable Alfred Nathaniel Curzon (1860–1920), a son of the 4th Lord Scarsdale, was an officer in the 5th (Militia) Battalion of the Derbyshire Regiment, which was visiting Ceylon in 1889 and 1890.	
P. G. von Donop	Better known as a footballer, he was an officer in the Royal Engineers and was stationed in Bombay from 1889 to 1894 as Inspector of Submarine Defences. He had always been a keen club cricketer but never played at top-class level. He joined Vernon for the two matches at the Gymkhana.	
F. W. Kerr	Frederick W. Kerr is known to have been a member of the Colombo Cricket Club in 1889 when he played in four matches, including one for and one against Vernon's XI. He and S. L. Murray were officers in the Gordon Highlanders who joined Vernon for the opening match against Ceylon in Kandy, because of other players being unavailable.	
S. L. Murray	Stewart Lygon Murray (1863–1930) is known to have been a member of the Colombo Cricket Club in 1889 when he played in three matches, including one for and one against Vernon's XI. He and F. W. Kerr joined Vernon for the opening match against Ceylon in Kandy, because of other players being unavailable. Murray was an officer in the Gordon Highlanders, first commissioned as a lieutenant in 1884. He later became a military historian.	
W. W. Sevier	Listed by CricketArchive in thirty 1884 schools matches which involved the All Saints' School at Bloxham. In 1888 and 1889, he played in some matches for the East Gloucestershire club, based in Cheltenham, and one for the Free Foresters.	
Robert Vizard	Robert Davenport Vizard (1861–1941) played cricket between 1878 and 1891. He represented each of Shropshire, Dorset and Cheshire but never played in top-class cricket. He joined Vernon's XI for the match in Meerut, having played against them in Agra. He died in Kalutara, Ceylon.	
John Waterfield	John Ewart Waterfield (1862–1891) played in five schools matches for Dulwich College in 1879 but is not recorded again until the 1889–90 season in India. He never played in top-class cricket. He joined Vernon's XI for their final match in Lahore, having played against them in three previous matches. He died 14 months later in Meerut, aged only 28.	
H. Hilliard	No information has been found about these players other than their appearances in the Ceylon, Agra or Lucknow matches.	
Hughes	No information has been found about these players other than their appearances in the Ceylon, Agra or Lucknow matches.	
A. John	No information has been found about these players other than their appearances in the Ceylon, Agra or Lucknow matches.	
Maxwell	No information has been found about these players other than their appearances in the Ceylon, Agra or Lucknow matches.	
Rawlinson	No information has been found about these players other than their appearances in the Ceylon, Agra or Lucknow matches.	
E. Thomas	No information has been found about these players other than their appearances in the Ceylon, Agra or Lucknow matches.	

== Bibliography ==
- ACS (1982). A Guide to First-class Cricket Matches Played in the British Isles. Nottingham: ACS.
- Bose, Mihir (1990). A History of Indian Cricket. London: André Deutsch. ISBN 978-02-33985-63-3.
- Caple, S. Canynge (1959). England versus India: 1886 – 1959. Worcester: Littlebury & Co. Ltd. ASIN B001EN6QX2. OCLC 451210.
- Coldham, James P. (1990). Lord Hawke – A Cricketing Biography. The Crowood Press. ISBN 978-1-8522-3305-1.
- Guha, Ramachandra (2001). A Corner of a Foreign Field – An Indian History of a British Sport. Picador. ISBN 978-0-3304-9117-4.
- Swanton, E. W.; Plumptre, George; Woodcock, George, eds. (1986). Barclays World of Cricket. London: Harper Collins. ISBN 978-00-02181-93-8.
