= Marylebone Cricket Club tours of Ceylon and Sri Lanka =

International cricket tours

International cricket teams raised by Marylebone Cricket Club (MCC) have visited Sri Lanka, formerly Ceylon, on 23 occasions from 1911-12 until the most recent tour in the winter of 2000-01. Eleven of the teams were England national cricket teams raised by MCC during the period when it held responsibility for Test cricket played by England. The other twelve were MCC teams per se which did not take part in Test cricket.

By 1911, there had been four English teams in Ceylon. Those were led by Ivo Bligh in 1882-83; George Vernon in 1889-90; Lord Hawke in 1892-93; and Andrew Stoddart in 1894-95. The Bligh and Stoddart teams were en route to Australia while the Vernon and Hawke ventures took in Ceylon as part of visits to India. In 1911-12, there was the first visit by an England Test team organised by MCC. Again, it was a case of using Colombo as a stopover en route to Australia. This team was led by Pelham Warner and played a match against a Ceylon XI which at that time was not a first-class team. After the First World War, the next team to stop in Ceylon was the 1920–21 England team, again en route to Australia and played the Ceylon XI in a match that was still not first-class.

In 1922–23, the first MCC team which was not a Test side visited Ceylon en route to Australia and New Zealand. Captained by Archie MacLaren, it played one second-class match in Colombo against the Ceylon XI. The 1924–25 England team, organised by MCC, played in Colombo in October 1924, in a drawn second-class match against the Ceylon XI.

The earliest match played in Ceylon that now has first-class status took place in February 1926 between a Ceylon XI and a visiting Bombay XI, which included future Indian Test player C. K. Nayudu. Next season, the first MCC team to play first-class matches in Ceylon was the 1926-27 side led by Arthur Gilligan. This team was essentially bound for India but in January and February 1927 it played four first-class matches in Ceylon against the Europeans XI, the Ceylonese XI, an Up-Country XI and the Ceylon national team.

MCC-organised England teams tended to play single day games until the 1933–34 team to India concluded its tour with four matches in Ceylon, two of them first-class. In February 1962, Ted Dexter's team returning from their tour of India and Pakistan played Ceylon at the Paikiasothy Saravanamuttu Stadium in Colombo in a three-day match. MCC won by 8 wickets. However, the MCC England teams in 1962–63 and 1965–66 played only minor matches when stopping over on their voyages to Australia. The 1965–66 team to Australia was the last to travel there by sea and so the Colombo stopovers ended.

In January 1969, the MCC England team visiting Pakistan came to Colombo and played Ceylon in a drawn match. By this time, the standard of cricket in the island had improved considerably and the national team was well on the way towards gaining Test status.

After Ceylon became Sri Lanka and MCC stopped organising England tours, the club has only rarely visited the island. There was something of a reunion spirit in 2000–01 when an MCC team arrived for the first time since 1977, but it played no first-class matches.
