= Calcutta Cricket and Football Club =

Multi-sports club based in India

Calcutta Cricket and Football Club ক্যালকাটা ক্রিকেট অ্যান্ড ফুটবল ক্লাব
- Full name: Calcutta Cricket and Football Club
- Nickname: Clippers
- Short name: CCFC, CC&FC
- Founded: 23 February 1792; 234 years ago (as Calcutta Cricket Club Clippers) (Note: The date refers to the original Calcutta Cricket Club established in 1792, which later merged with Calcutta F.C. (1872–1965) and Ballygunge Cricket Club in 1965, to form the current club.) 1965; 61 years ago (as Calcutta Cricket & Football Club)
- Ground: CC&FC Ballygunge Ground Calcutta FC Ground
- Capacity: 22,000; 15,000
- Chairman: Subrata Das
- Head coach: Jamshid Nassiri
- League: CFL 1st Division
- Website: ccfc1792.com
Home colours	Away colours

Calcutta Cricket and Football Club (popularly known by its abbreviations CC&FC and CCFC) is an Indian professional multi-sports club based in Kolkata, West Bengal. Founded in 1792 as a cricket institution, the football and rugby sections were added when it merged with Calcutta Football Club (oldest football club in Asia, founded in 1872) in 1965. This is the oldest cricket club outside Great Britain.

The rugby section of the club made CC&FC the oldest rugby institution founded outside the United Kingdom and Ireland. Club's football section competes in the premier division of Calcutta Football League, fifth tier of the Indian football league system.

== History and overview ==
=== Early years (1792–1960s) ===
==== Calcutta Cricket Club ====
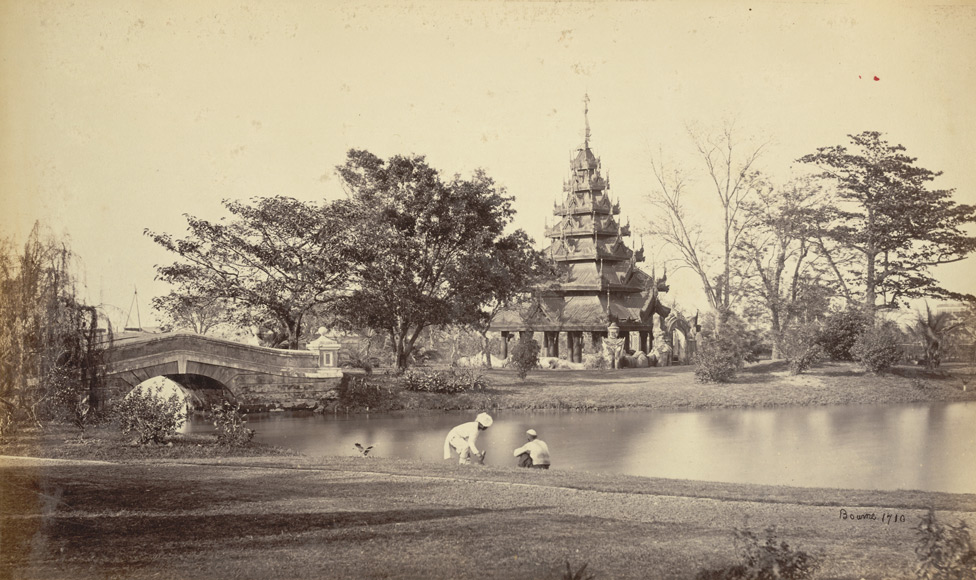
The Eden Gardens in Calcutta, home of cricket in India.

"The Gentlemen of the Calcutta Cricket Club are getting themselves into Wind, and preparing to take the Field for a very active Campaign..."

— Hicky's Bengal Gazette (December 16, 1780).

The history of CC&FC dates back to 1792, when the club was established by the name of "Calcutta Cricket Club Clippers". It was primarily a cricket institution in the East India Company rule in India. The club was also founded as one of the earliest known gentlemen's clubs (for Europeans only) in Calcutta, then capital of British India. Recent evidence in the form of an article published in the Hicky's Bengal Gazette, suggests the club (described as "Gentlemen of Calcutta Cricket Club") existed in 1780 – that would make it the oldest cricket club in the world. (Note: As per the Bengal Gazette, 16 December 1780; Hobbes, John Barley Corn Bahadur, 436–7. The Bengal Gazette entry indicates the world's first cricket club was started in Bengal, the Marylebone Cricket Club of London, being founded in 1787.) In 1792 during their tour in India, Eton cricket team (Old Etonians) appeared in an exhibition match against Calcutta Cricket Club. By 1825, CC&FC established themselves as one of the formidable sides in Bengal Presidency, alongside British Army-operated cricket teams in the country.

==== Calcutta Football Club ====
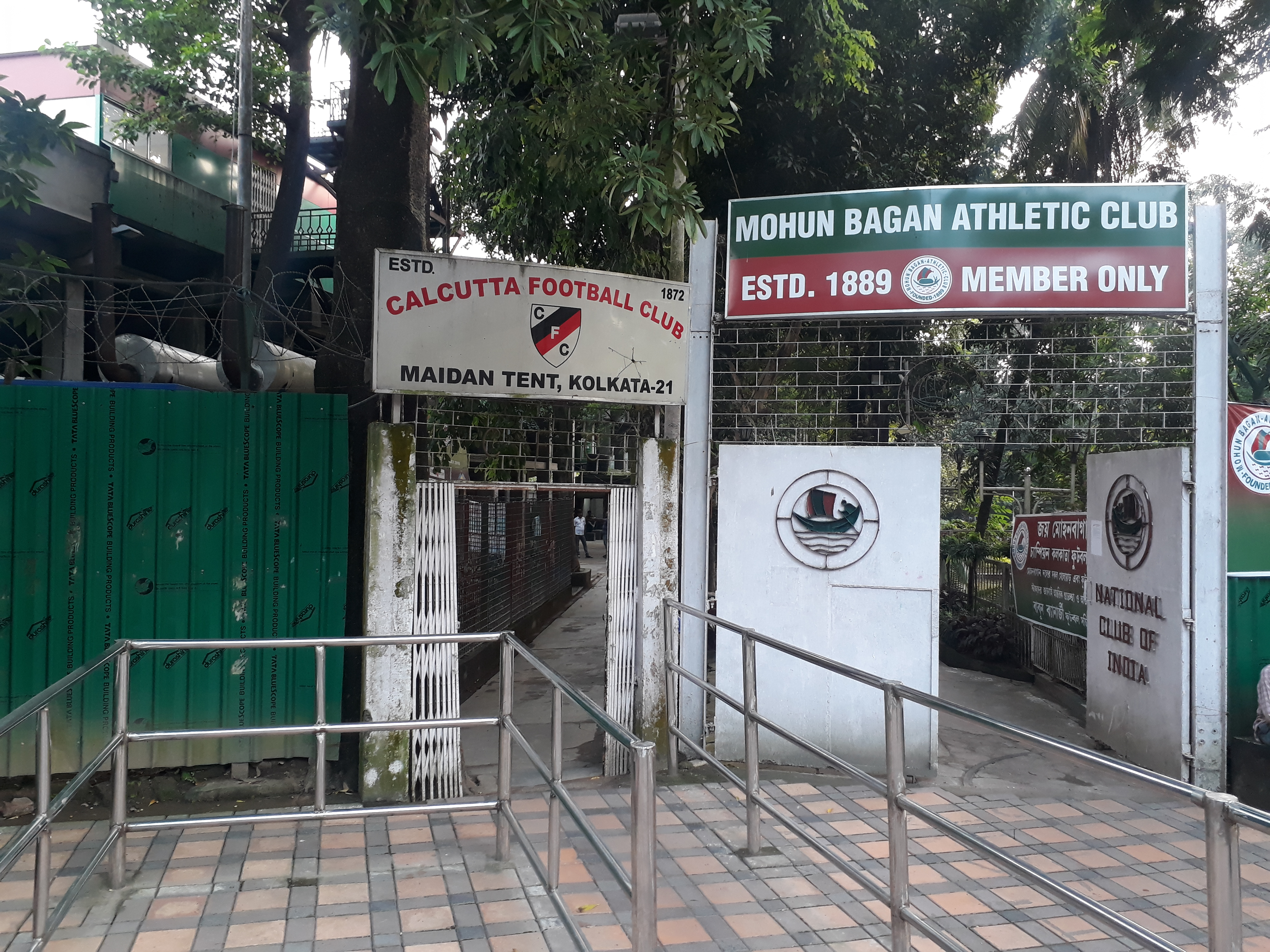
Main entrance to the tent of CC&FC's football section (in left), beside the tent of Mohun Bagan Athletic Club in Kolkata Maidan area.

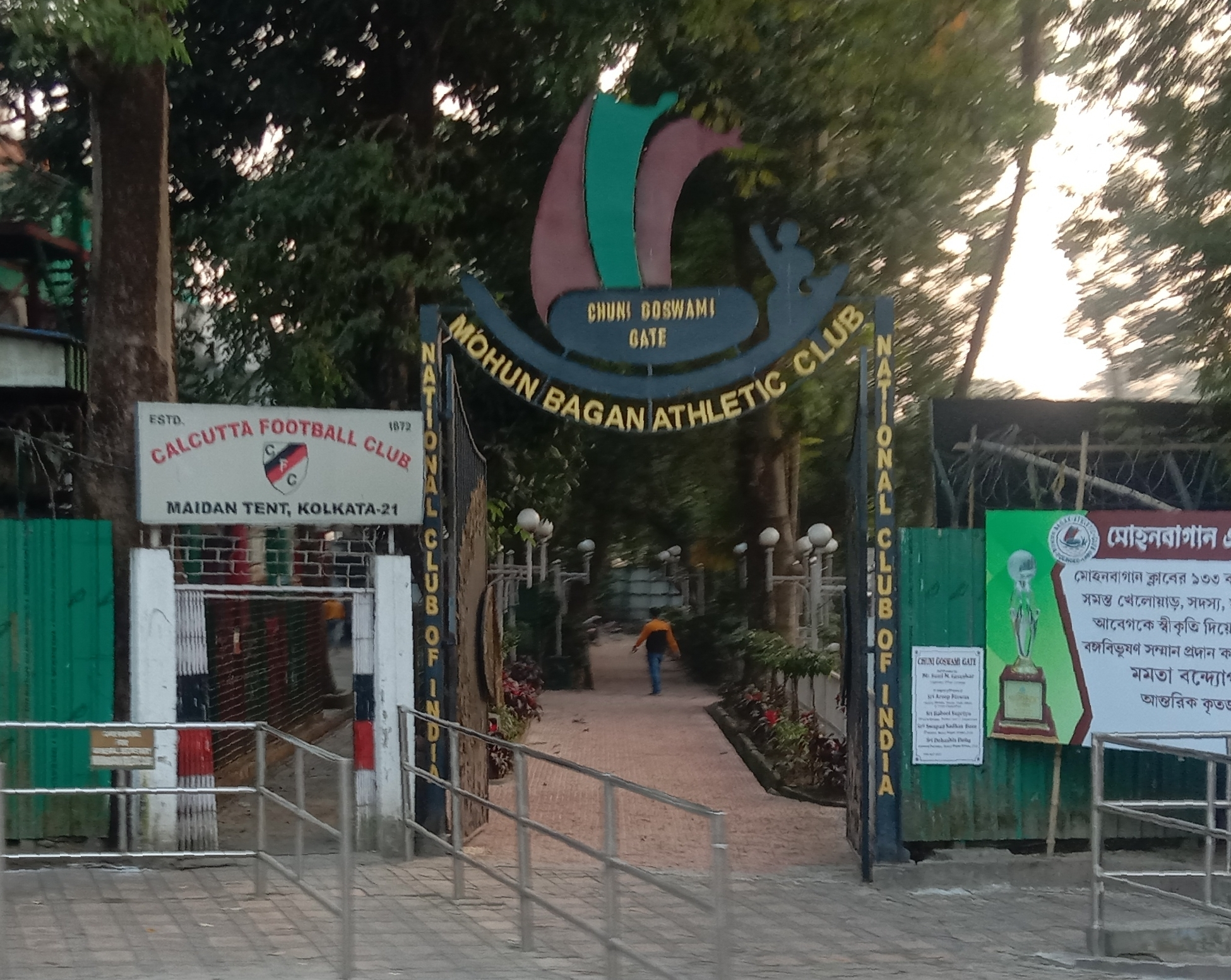
Main entrance of the Calcutta Football Club in left, beside 'Chuni Goswami Gate' of Mohun Bagan in Kolkata Maidan, in December 2023.

Incorporated in 1872, Calcutta Football Club predominately introduced rugby in the country. Outside the United Kingdom, it is the oldest patron club that went on to form the Rugby Football Union (RFU). As per the Amrita Bazar Patrika, the club's membership was restricted to people belonging to the upper strata of British middle class. They later contributed in introducing and developing association football; Nagendra Prasad Sarbadhikari (founding father of football in India) taught the game to his classmates of the prestigious Hare School compound in 1877, after observing British soldiers playing the game in the Calcutta FC ground. CC&FC soon emerged as one of the prestigious private members' clubs in Asia; By January 1873, nearly 137 members had enrolled, while European women were granted membership in the first half of the 19th century. The club became one of the founding members of the Indian Football Association (IFA) in 1893, then headed by British administrators. The primary sport Rugby, later suffered because of the departure of British regiments. Bicycle Polo division (now known as Cycle Polo) was formed in 1901–02, and being played since then in CC&FC.

=== Merger and later years (1960s–present) ===
Shield of CC&FC

CC&FC were the founding members of the CAB (Cricket Association of Bengal), IFA (Indian Football Association) and BHA (Hockey Bengal formerly known as Bengal Hockey Association). CC&FC has many tournaments where outsiders also take part. We have coaching schemes for youngsters in cricket, football, swimming and rugby.

— Deepankar Nandi, president of CC&FC, on club's diversified existence and contributions in Indian sports (at the Sportstar East Sports Conclave 2023, hosted by The Hindu; February 6, 2023).

After acquiring both "Ballygunge Cricket Club" (1864–1950) and "Calcutta Football Club" (1872–77; 1884–1965) in 1965, the institution completed all the absorptions to introduce themselves under the name of "Calcutta Cricket and Football Club" (CC&FC). Sports still being practised at the club include: cricket, football, field hockey, rugby, cycle polo, swimming, tennis, and bridge. The football team competed in both the Premier Division A and B of Calcutta Football League. The club's cricket and football teams usually participated in their respective divisions as "Calcutta Cricket Club" for cricket and "Calcutta Football Club" for football. Their hockey and rugby teams participate under the combined name of "Calcutta Cricket and Football Club".

CC&FC has been hosting various tournaments, including Merchants' Cup (a corporate open tournament) since 1970s for both football and cricket. Merchants' Cup in hockey hosted by the club until its discontinuation in 2005, while cricket tournaments at the club are being sponsored by the Indian Premier League outfit Kolkata Knight Riders. Other tournaments such as J. Thomas Cup in rugby, and Georgiadi 7s tournament are also hosted at the club ground. In November 2017, the club organized their 225th anniversary celebration, marking the 225 years of cricket in India, with presence of noted international cricketers like Sunil Gavaskar, Saurav Ganguly, MS Dhoni, Yuvraj Singh, VVS Laxman, and Virat Kohli. In June 2023, Indian Football Association made an official announcement of merger of the both Premier Division A and B of Calcutta Football League (CFL), ahead of 125th edition, and allowed CC&FC to compete in Group I.

== Departments ==
=== Cricket ===
Ground of the Calcutta Cricket Club, 15 Jan'y. 1861 H.M. 68th L.I. from Rangoon, versus the Calcutta Cricket Club, a lithograph after a watercolour by Percy Carpenter, depicting a visit by the 68th (Durham) Regiment of Foot (Light Infantry).

CC&FC's oldest sporting department is first-class cricket, which was incepted as the "Calcutta Cricket Club Clippers" by British expatriates who had come over with the British East India Company. Have been in existence since 1792, it is the second oldest cricket club in the world after Marylebone Cricket Club. On 23 February 1792, Madras Courier reported the schedule of a match between Calcutta Cricket Club and a team from Barrackpore, and the news was later highlighted by Irwin Rosenwater on The London Times. The club later played in annual fixtures against numerous British regimental teams stationed in both Fort William and Barrackpur Cantonment. According to The Bengal Hurkaru and Chronicle, they also played against other visiting teams, consisting Old Etonians, Old Harrovians and alumni of both the Oxford and Cambridge University.

During its earliest years of existence, the Calcutta Cricket Club played its home games near river Hooghly but it was not until 1841, when the institution got land to establish its home match venue. On 19 April 1864, CC&FC was granted permission to build a pavilion at eastern end of the Eden Gardens. There, a large pavilion of 125 feet by 25 feet was built out of Burma teak, modelled after pavilions of the Lord's Cricket Ground. In 1889–90, the club came into limelight when Marylebone Cricket Club came to play in Calcutta by responding to the club's invitation, which was the first visit of a foreign team to play cricket in India. In 1889–90 cricket season, another English team named "G. F. Vernon's XI", managed by George Vernon and captained by Martin Hawke, toured to Ceylon and India; played against Calcutta Cricket Club at the Eden Gardens on 23 December, under the "Laws of Cricket" (prevailed in England at the time, including the compulsory follow-on and the recently introduced 5-ball over). In 1892–93 cricket season, an English team led by Martin Hawke, came to India and played against Calcutta Cricket Club.

In 1926–27 season during winter, CC&FC played the key role in bringing Marylebone Cricket Club, which was their second tour to India, and MCC was then led by former England captain Arthur Edward Gilligan. On 15 August 1950, then club president T. C. Longfield handed over the ownership of Eden Gardens to then Chief Minister of West Bengal, Bidhan Chandra Roy. In December 1962, the club made history, when its members announced and conducted a 5-match series between Calcutta Cricket Club and Merchants' XI, introducing "limited over cricket format" (all were 20 overs). It was later merged with the Calcutta Football Club (incorporated in 1872, where both footballs — rugby and association were practised) and the Ballygunge Cricket Club over the years to become the "Calcutta Cricket and Football Club" in 1965. CC&FC is currently under the jurisdiction of Cricket Association of Bengal (CAB), and competes in the CAB First Division League, J.C. Mukherjee T-20 Trophy, N.C. Chatterjee T-20 Trophy, and other regional tournaments. Later in the 1970s, wooden pavilion of Calcutta was demolished, while the construction of the new club house (current headquarters of the CAB) began, which was named after Bidhan Chandra Roy. Club's cricket section is currently headquartered in 19/1, Garcha 1st Lane, Ballygunge, Kolkata. In 2021–22 season, CC&FC ended their CAB Second Division League achieving runners-up position which resulted the promotion to First Division League.

=== Rugby union ===
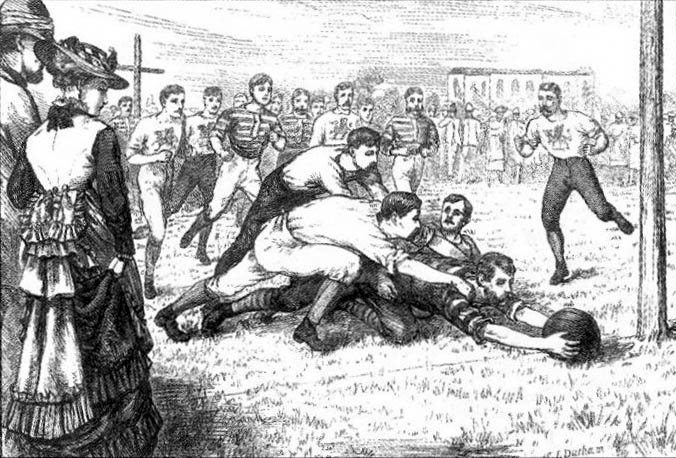
Scene of a rugby match at the CFC ground in Calcutta, c. 1875 (from The Illustrated London News).

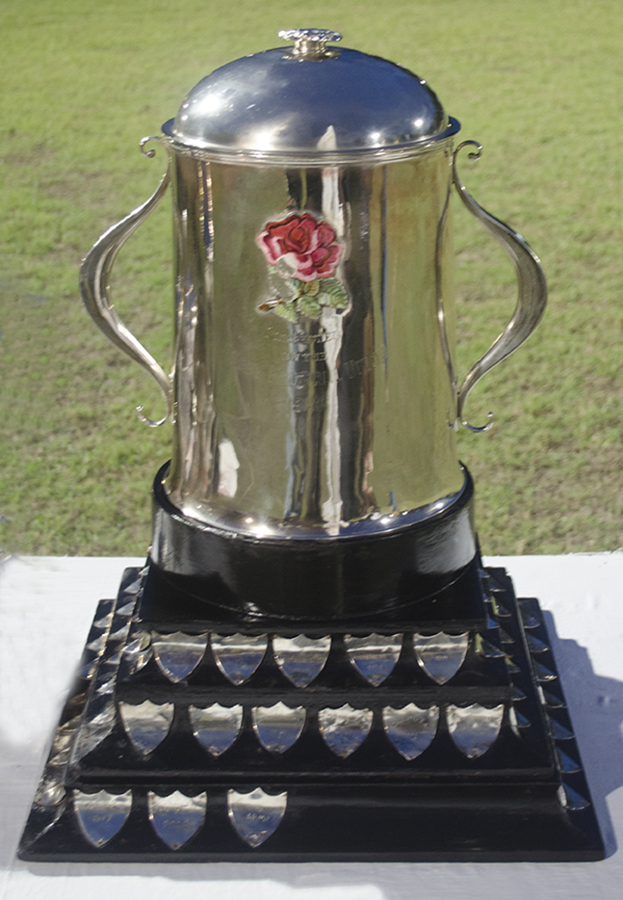
Trophy of the All India Rugby Cup, at the CC&FC.

In the British Raj, Rugby union was introduced and emerged as second most popular winter sport after association football. For the first time in the country, a scratch match or two played in Calcutta and Madras during the visit of MS Galatea in 1871. At the ground of CC&FC, first recorded match was played, on Christmas Day. The incident paved the way for growth of the British sport in India, and foundation of "Calcutta Rugby Football Club" in January the following year by expats, former students of Rugby School and soldiers of the Royal East Kent Regiment – which was stationed in the 1870s. In 1874, Calcutta Football Club joined the Rugby Football Union (RFU). After departure of British troops, and recreational facilities became disbanded, club's rugby section was discontinued in 1878. Members decided to keep the memory of the club alive by having the remaining 270 silver rupee coins in their bank vault melted down and made into a trophy (the Calcutta Cup) by W.E. Jellicoe Silversmith & Watchmaker from the Esplanade Row, which was then presented to the Rugby Football Union (described as "the best means of doing some lasting good for the cause of Rugby Football"). The sport came back at the CC&FC in 1884. In 1890, an inter-club tournament was incepted by the CC&FC, named Calcutta Rugby Union Challenge Cup (known simply as Calcutta Cup), and its second division trophy was clinched by the club. Later in 2007, they emerged as runners-up in that tournament.

I regret to say the Calcutta Football Club has ceased to exist, it being now found quite impossible to get sufficient men together to play even a scratch game…This being the case I proposed at a Meeting of the few remaining Members of the Club held on Tuesday last the 18th inst. as the best means of doing some lasting good for the cause of Rugby Football & as a slight memento of the Calcutta Club, that the Funds remaining to the credit of the Club should be devoted to the purchase of a Challenge Cup & presented to the Rugby Union.

— G. A. James Rothney (captain, honorary secretary and treasurer of the Calcutta FC), highlighting this in his letter to the Honorary Secretary and Treasurer of the Rugby Football Union, H. I. Graham Esq (dated 20 December 1877), on club's disfunction in 1877.

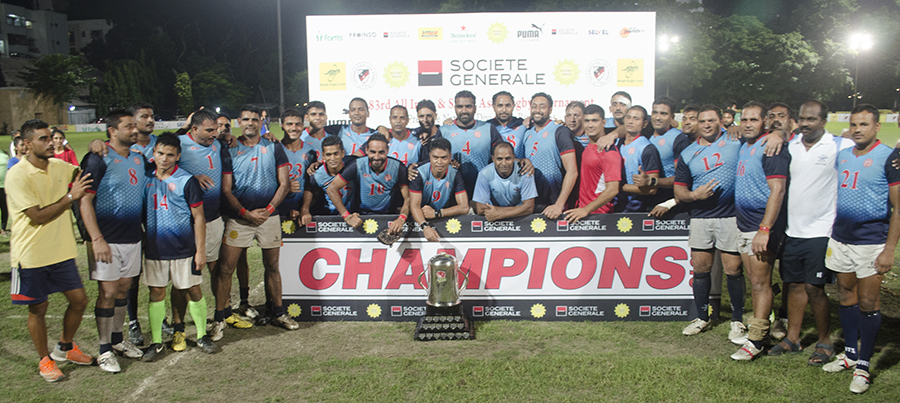
83rd All India and South Asia Rugby Tournament hosted at the CC&FC ground in 2016

As one of the most successful Indian rugby teams, CC&FC is a regular participant of the prestigious All India & South Asia Rugby Tournament. The championship has been hosted by the club on multiple occasions. Women's rugby team of CC&FC also participate in that tournament. The club also hosts Georgiadi Club Rugby Sevens tournament, in which CC&FC's men's and women's teams (known officially as CCFC Reds) compete. The club later became affiliated to the Indian Rugby Football Union (IRFU), which was incorporated in 1995. In June 2013, CC&FC's affiliate club Hong Kong FC's rugby team "HKFC Vandals" toured to Kolkata and played against CCFC Reds. At the 87th edition of All India & South Asia Rugby Championship in Mumbai, CC&FC won the plate final, defeating Magicians Foundation 28–5. The club also hosted 'Asia Rugby Division 3 – South Region Championship', with backing from Bengal Olympic Association.

=== Association football ===
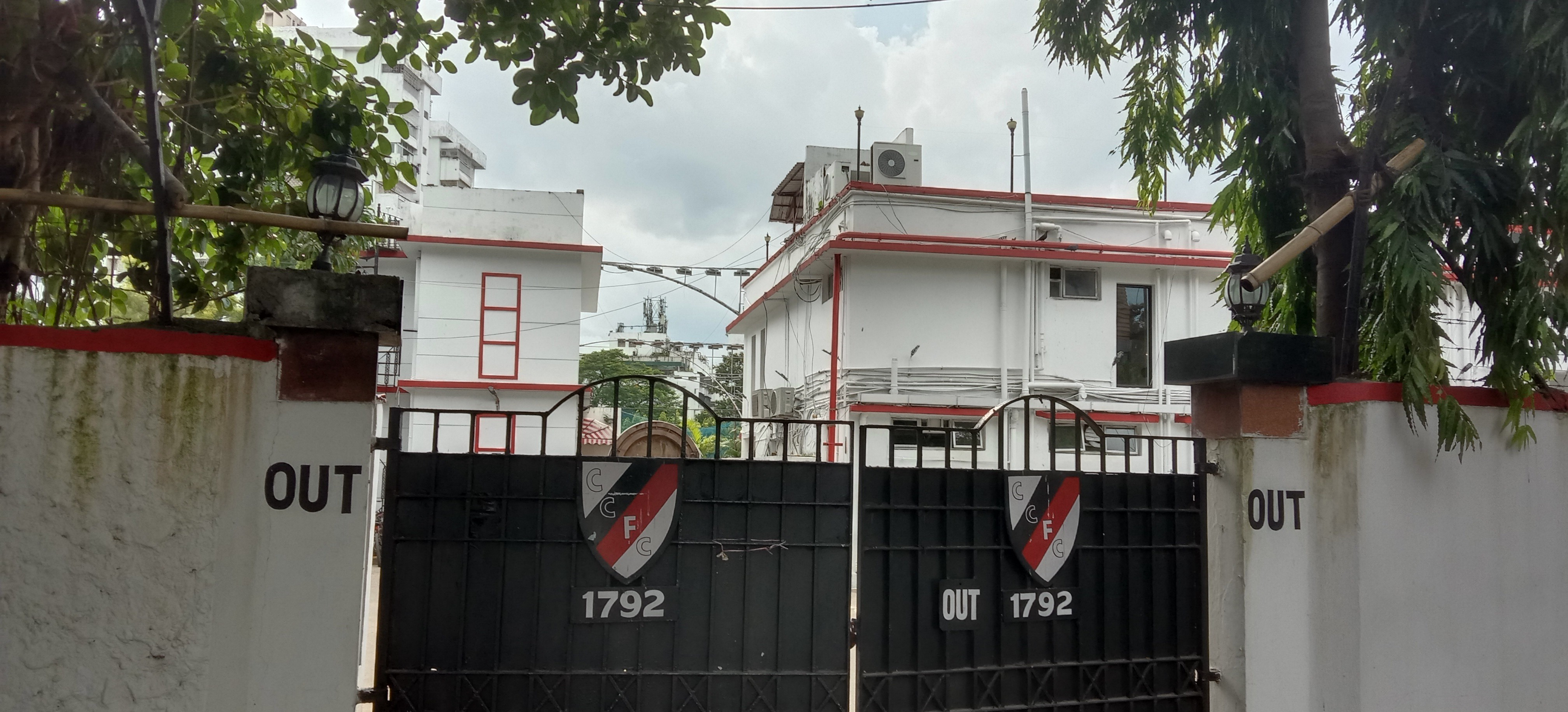
CCFC main building in Ballygunge

Run by the British officials since its inception in 1872, "Calcutta Football Club" became the first of the three European football clubs, others being Calcutta Rangers and Dalhousie AC. They soon emerged as one of the leading football teams in the Bengal Presidency. It was then consisting of European players, and enjoyed fierce rivalry predominantly with indigenous outfit Mohun Bagan. Calcutta Football Club stayed away from Trades Cup, the country's first open football tournament because members felt that their "enjoyment of the sport would be impaired if they join the competitive fray", it was instrumental in instituting the Indian Football Association (IFA) in Calcutta very much on London lines. The team for the first time was defeated by Mohun Bagan in 1923 in the return leg of CFL, but managed to clinch both the league and IFA Shield titles in that season.

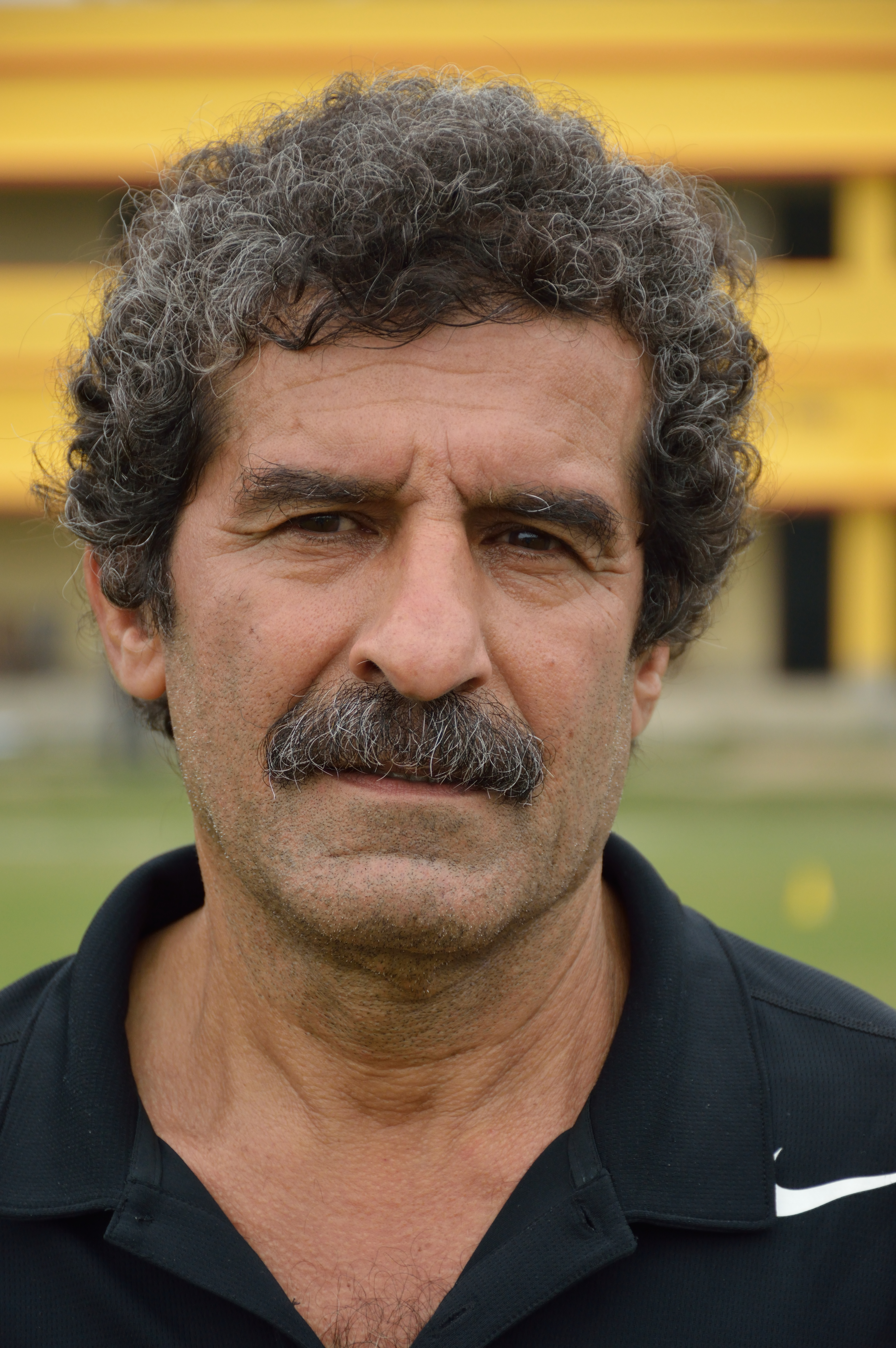
Jamshid Nassiri, managed CC&FC in the 2022–23 CFL Premier Division.

Calcutta FC was the most successful team in prestigious Calcutta Football League in pre-independence era, oldest league in Asia, in pre-independence era (in which, native teams were barred from participating for the first fifteen seasons), clinching eight titles. The team is also nine-time winners of IFA Shield. In 2004, the club emerged victorious in historic Trades Cup, defeating Eastern Railway 2–1 in final. In 2022, they roped in noted Indian-Iranian footballer Jamshid Nassiri as head coach.

=== Field hockey ===
Club's field hockey team is known as CCFC Gremlins, and is affiliated with the Bengal Hockey Association (often shortened to 'Hockey Bengal'). The team was once primarily consisting of European and Anglo-Indian players. CC&FC is regular participant of both the Calcutta Hockey League, and Beighton Cup (one of world's oldest hockey tournaments). They won 1924 edition of Beighton Cup, with a runner-up finish in 1919. In 2022–23, CC&FC hosted inaugural edition of CCFC Hockey Premier League.

=== Tennis ===
Tennis as a racket sport in India, introduced by the Britishers and is an important sport, still being practiced within CCFC since 1920s. The club is an affiliated member of the Bengal Tennis Association (BTA). One of the earliest tennis grass courts were installed within club grounds in Ballygunge under the supervision of R. W. Plummer. The club clinched Ballygunge Cricket Club Open Lawn Tennis Championship title in 1929. Editions of prestigious Bengal Lawn Tennis Championships (incorporated in 1887), alongside Indian Satellite Tennis Championships and Hometrust Senior Nationals, were organized by the CC&FC. In 2022–23 season, inaugural edition of Calcutta Tennis Premier League (CTPL) was hosted in the club.

=== Cycle polo ===
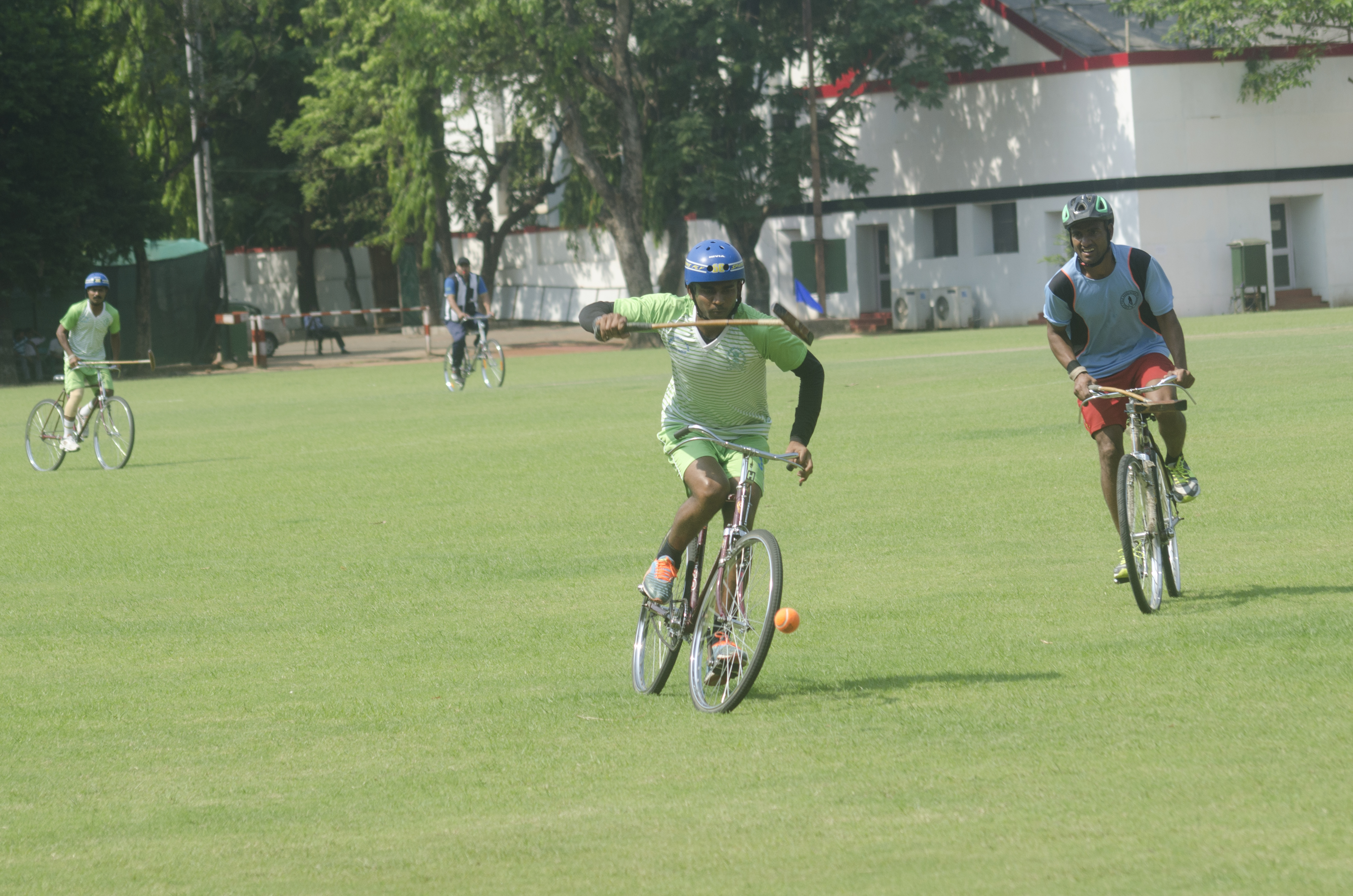
Cycle polo being played at the CC&FC ground in 2018

Cycle polo, a specific version of polo being played using bicycles, has been one of the major sports being practiced at the CC&FC for decades. The club is also affiliated with both Cycle Polo Federation of India (CPFI) and Cycle Polo Association of Bengal, the national and regional governing bodies. The first Merchant's Cup tournament for cycle polo was organized and hosted by the club in 1973. They also hosted numerous cycle polo tournaments, including – All India Cycle Polo Invitation Cup, Legend's Tournament, Marsh Mug, Swaroop Bhanjdeo Memorial Tournament, Apji Vaiji Singh Memorial Trophy, and CC&FC Cup. The club is also a regular participant in editions of Laxmibilas Cup in Kolkata.

=== Other sports ===
Other individual and team sports being played at the CC&FC are: golf, bridge, volleyball, table tennis, swimming, badminton, squash, and darts. Their volleyball team takes part in Elliot Shield State Volleyball Championship. The club also won 4th edition of Monsoon League Bridge Tournament hosted by Tollygunge Club. CC&FC also hosts Inter-club Darts Championship.

== Crest, colours and rivalries ==
The crest of CC&FC has numerous versions, while the present version is containing a shield, with having four stripes, in club colours black, red, and white, with initials of "CCFC" and foundation year 1792. Red and white as club colours, were introduced in 1877, during the tenure of G. A. J. Rothney as CC&FC's honorary secretary and treasurer, who played the crucial role in funding within the club.

When tournaments began and organized by the Indian Football Association in the late 19th century, CC&FC shared rivalries with two all-European teams Dalhousie AC and Calcutta Rangers, along with fully indigenous side Mohun Bagan AC. In later years, other rivals of the club were Mohammedan Sporting, Aryans, and British regimental outfits. From 1870s and 80s onwards, club's rugby team predominantly competed against two contemporary sides Bombay Gymkhana and Madras Cricket Club, while currently sharing rivalries with Jungle Crows and Army Red.

== Home ground ==
Due to the absence of permanent venue in earlier days, the club used grounds in Esplanade, parallel with grounds on the bank of river Hooghly, between Fort William and Government House. In 1825, 'Sketch of the Maidan' was done by the club, and in 1841, they were allowed to enclose the ground. The club used eastern end of the Eden Gardens (then known as 'Auckland Circus Gardens') from 1860s until shifting their base to Ballygunge in 1950s. CC&FC later established its earlier known headquarter at the Eden Gardens, and built a pavilion there in 1871.

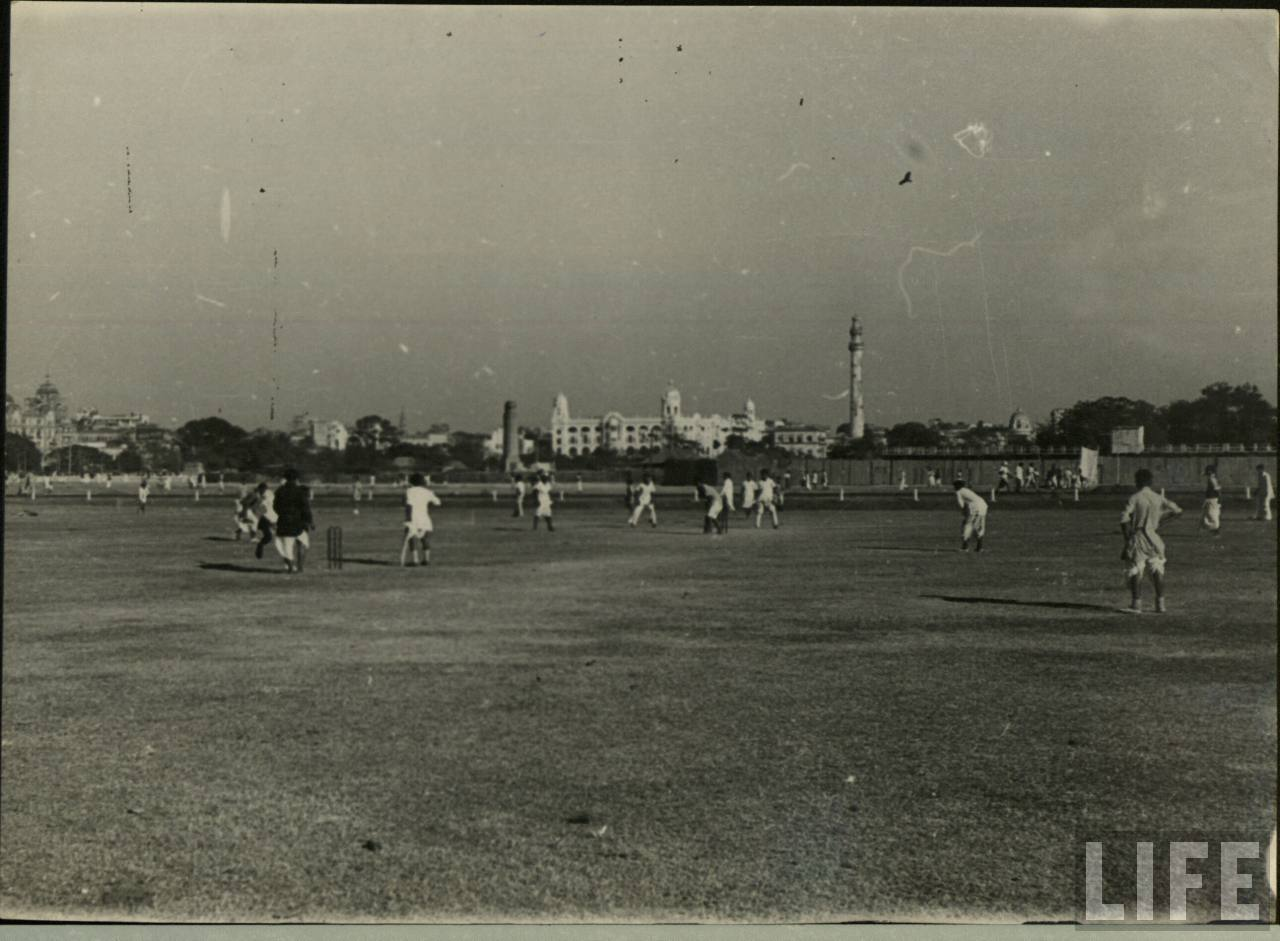
Cricket being played by Europeans, an undated photograph of Calcutta Cricket Club ground.

Club's football section uses Calcutta FC Ground (commonly known as Mohun Bagan Ground) in Kolkata Maidan. It was also used as venue of the 1954 edition of Asian Quadrangular Football Tournament. The ground hosted exhibition matches of India and numerous visiting European teams, including a match between India and Allsvenskan club AIK in December 1954. The present CC&FC ground for cricket is situated in Ballygunge, which serves as one of the venues for prestigious Ranji Trophy matches.

== Notable players and members ==
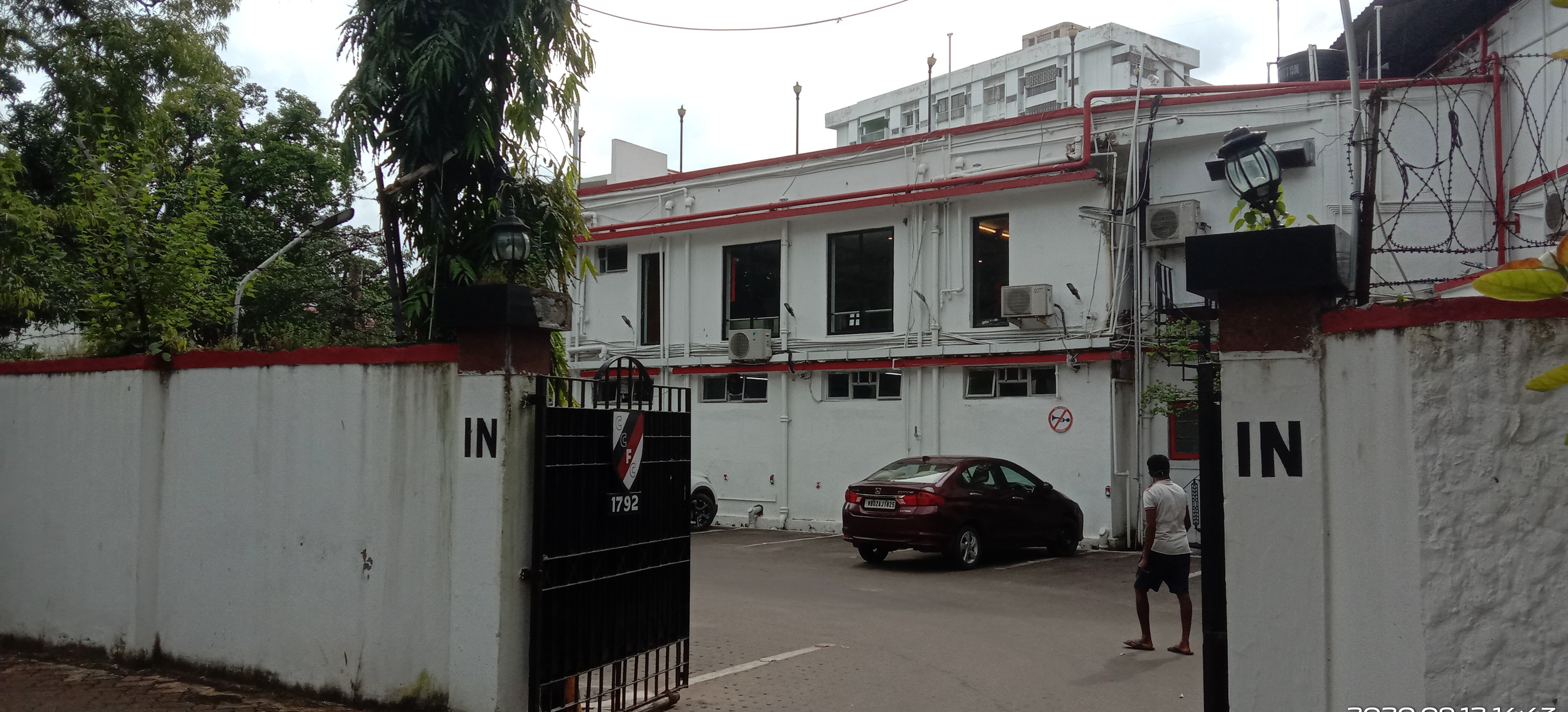
Front view of the CC&FC building in Ballygunge

=== Noted players ===
Rugby

- (United Kingdom) Benjamin Burns – represented England in the first international match against Scotland in 1871.
- (United Kingdom) (Scotland) Stephen Finney – represented England from 1872 to 1873.
- (United Kingdom) (England) G. A. James Rothney – served as captain of CC&FC rugby team, and both honorary secretary and treasurer of the club.
- (Republic of Ireland) G. St. Lager Fagan – represented Ireland internationally, in late-nineteenth century.
- D. McKinnon – represented Scotland internationally.
- G. C. Mclagan – represented Scotland internationally.

Cricket

- (United Kingdom) Reginald Lagden – English cricketer, captained CC&FC in the 1930s.
- (United Kingdom) John Lindsay Guise – English first-class cricketer, also played for Middlesex, Oxford University and Europeans.

Football

- (United Kingdom) H. G. Pooler – regular member of the football team of CC&FC in early 1900s, a noted IFA referee, who officiated the historic final of the 1911 IFA Shield.
- (India) Kiyan Nassiri – youngest footballer to score hat-trick in the Indian Super League, and Mohun Bagan Best Forward Awardee in 2022.
- Rafikul Islam – played for CC&FC and represented Bangladesh at senior international level.

Darts

- (India) Jackie Khanna – national darts champion (women's).

=== Noted members ===
"I have the most cherished memories of the Club from way back in 1978 when I became a young member... I would really want to map this Club on a Worldwide basis as some great Cricket establishments are not aware of CC&FC's grand and redoubtable legacy, by sheer weight of its long-established heritage and tradition the CC&FC's existence for more than two and a quarter centuries speaks for itself..."

— Arun Lal (former Indian international cricketer), on his CC&FC and his career.

A large number of notable athletes are associated with the club, including:

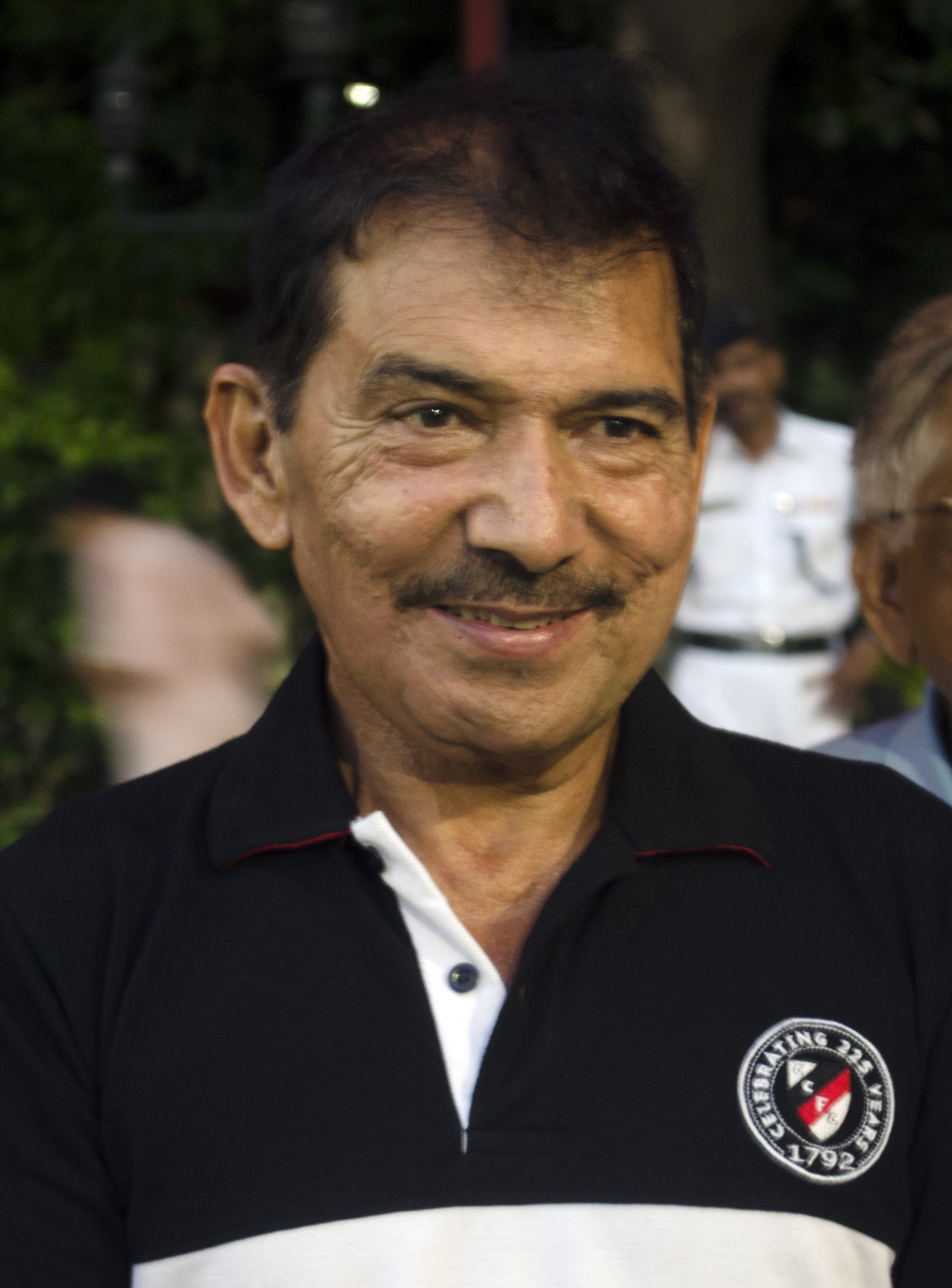
Lal at the CC&FC in September 2017, wearing the jersey of club's "celebrating 225 years".

- Football: Chuni Goswami, Subhas Bhowmick, S. Bhattacharjee, Pradip Choudhury, P. Ganguly, Santo Mitra, Shyam Thapa, Kiyan Nassiri.
- Hockey: Keshav Chandra Datt, Gurbux Singh, Dr. Vece Paes, Anand Mandapaka.
- Cricket: Punya B. Datta, Ashok Gandotra, Devang Gandhi, Sourav Ganguly, Dilip Doshi, Saba Karim, Arun Lal, Pranab Roy, Biswajit Bhowmick, Jhulan Goswami.
- Tennis: Chiradip Mukerjea, Enrico Piperno, Leander Paes.

== Presidential history ==
=== Notable presidents ===
- (United Kingdom) Reginald Bousfield Lagden (OBE, MC) – British cricketer, hockey player, and sports administrator, also served as president of the Cricket Association of Bengal, and was awarded the Military Cross.
- (United Kingdom) Alexander Lindsay "Alec" Hosie – English first class cricketer, who represented teams including Marylebone Cricket Club, Oxford University, Hampshire County Cricket Club and Bengal.
- (United Kingdom) Thomas Cuthbert Longfield – English first-class cricketer, captained Bengal to their first Ranji Trophy win in 1938–39.
- (United Kingdom) H. J. Moorhouse – played the key role in bringing worldwide attention for CC&FC, sent letter to The Times highlighting club's existence within a news on Madras Courier dated 23 February 1792, which marked the club as oldest sporting club outside the UK (turning down the claims of Oporto Cricket and Lawn Tennis Club of Portugal in 1955).
- (British Raj) Pearson Surita – Anglo-Indian corporate executive and cricket commentator of the All India Radio (AIR)
- (India) Keshav Dutt – Indian hockey player, won gold medals at the 1948 and 1952 Olympics, presided both the CC&FC and Saturday Club.
- (India) Dr. Vece Paes – Indian hockey midfielder, who won bronze medal at the 1972 Munich Olympics.
- (India) Arun Lal – Indian international cricketer and sports commentator.
- (India) Utpal Ganguly – Indian sports administrator, member of the CAB, who served as secretary of the Indian Football Association.
- (India) S. M. "Dada" Osman – former captain of the CC&FC rugby team.
- (India) Dinyar Mucadum – Indian businessman, member of the CAB, who served as CEO of The Bengal Club.
- (India) Dr. Pranab Dasgupta – Indian doctor, member of the Royal College of Obstetricians and Gynaecologists, who served as president of The Bengal Club and East Bengal.

== Honours ==
=== Football ===
- Calcutta Football League/CFL Premier Division
  - Champions (8): 1899, 1907, 1916, 1918, 1920, 1922, 1923, 1925
- IFA Shield (Note: Fourth oldest football tournament, organized by the IFA (W.B.), and played between the local clubs of West Bengal and other invited ones.)
  - Champions (9): 1896, 1900, 1903, 1904, 1906, 1915, 1922, 1923, 1924
  - Runners-up (8): 1905, 1907, 1910, 1914, 1916, 1919, 1921, 1936
- Trades Cup
  - Champions (1): 2004
- Minto Fort Cup
  - Runners-up (1): 1906
- CFL First Division League
  - Champions (1): 2022–23
  - Runners-up (2): 2020–21, 2021–22
- Phuket Soccer 7s Championship
  - Plate final (1): 2023

=== Field hockey ===
- Beighton Cup
  - Champions (1): 1924
  - Runners-up (1): 1919
- Calcutta Hockey League
  - Champions (3): 2005, 2013, 2014
  - Third place (1): 2020–21

=== Rugby ===
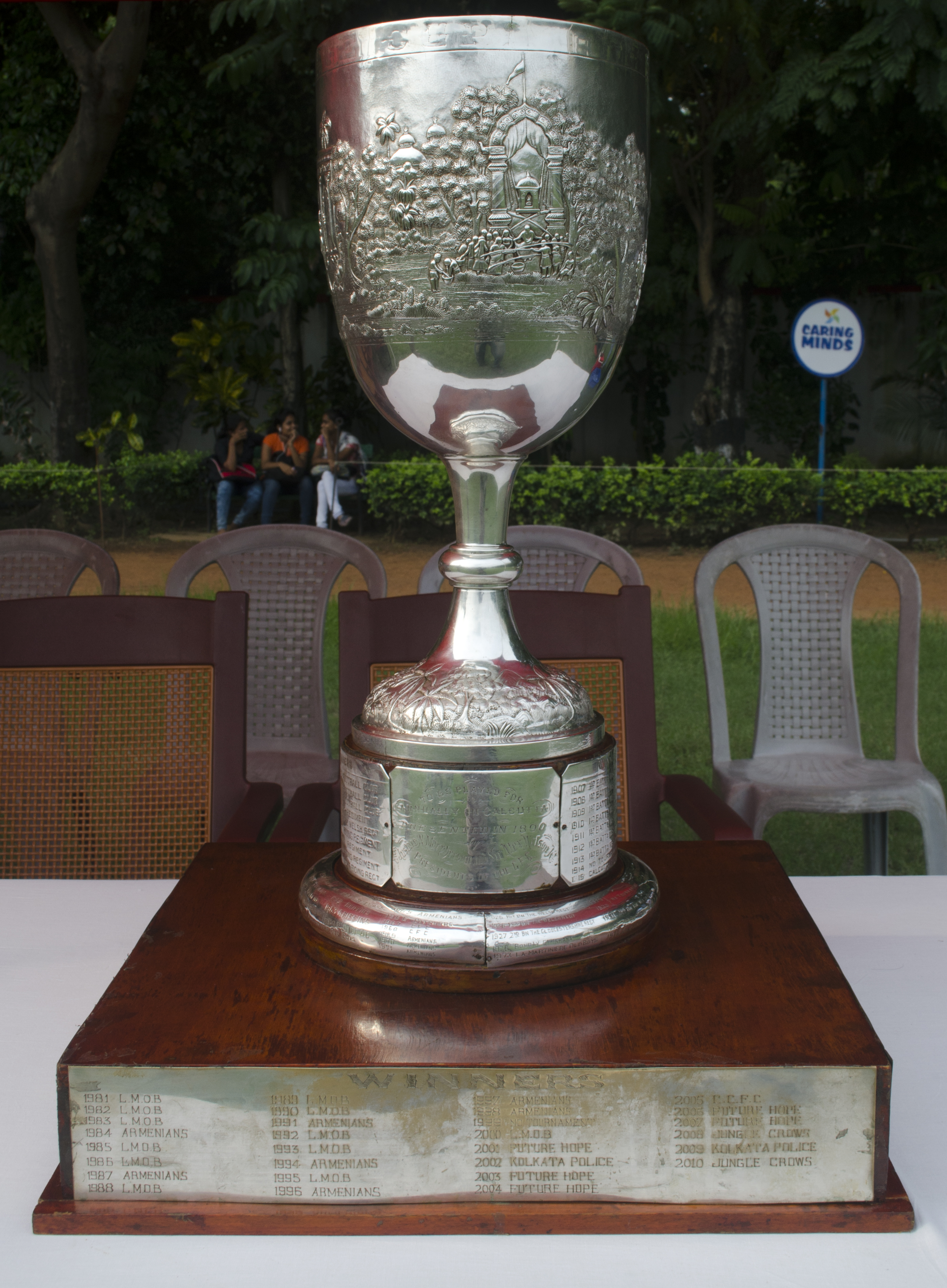
The "Other Calcutta Cup" trophy at CC&FC building, won by the club in 2005.

- All India & South Asia Rugby Championship
  - Runners-up (1): 1932 (Note: In the final of All India Rugby Football Tournament on 22 October 1932, held in Madras, CCFC lost to Ceylonese Rugby & Football Club.)
  - Plate winners (1): 2022
- Calcutta Rugby Union Challenge Cup
  - Champions (3): 2005, 2014, 2015
  - Runners-up (4): 2007, 2008, 2023, 2024
- The Centenary Cup
  - Runners-up (1): 2015
- BRU Women's Inter-district 7s Rugby Championship
  - Plate trophy (1): 2024
  - Bronze medal (1): 2021–22

=== Cricket ===
- CAB Second Division League
  - Runners-up (1): 2021–22
- CC&FC Merchant's Cup
  - Runners-up (1): 2021–22
- Bangkok International Sixes Tournament
  - Runners-up (1): 2023
- Calcutta Inter-club T10 League
  - Champions (1): 2023–24

=== Tennis ===
- Ballygunge Open Lawn Tennis Championship
  - Champions (1): 1929
- ITC Inter-club Championship
  - Champions (1): 2021–22
- Bengal Tennis Association League
  - Runners-up (1): 2021–22
- Calcutta Gymkhana Tennis Championship
  - Silver medal (1): 2022–23
- Saturday Club Sports Carnival – Tennis
  - Runners-up (2): 2023, 2024

=== Bridge ===
- Monsoon League Inter-Club Bridge Tournament
  - Champions (2): 2021, 2022

=== Darts ===
- Inter-Club Darts Tournament
  - Champions (1): 2021
- RCGC Darts Championship
  - Champions (1): 2022
  - Runners-up (1): 2021
- The Royal Darts Carnival
  - Champions (3): 2022, 2023, 2024

=== Golf ===
- Chaki Memorial Golf Tournament
  - Runners-up (2): 2023, 2024

== Records and statistics ==
=== Overall records ===
- Most successful team in the Calcutta Football League in pre-independence era, with eight titles between 1899 and 1925 (first non-army team to win the title too).
- Most successful team in the IFA Shield in pre-independence era, with nine titles between 1896 and 1924 (first non-army team to win the title too).
- Oldest tennis tournament in India, hosted at the CC&FC: Bengal Lawn Tennis Championships in 1887 (inaugural edition)

=== Tennis captains of CC&FC ===
Name	Nationality	Years
Debu Ghose	India	1974–1980
Prakash Dayal	India	1980–1984
Bikram Das	India	1984–1989
Sumanta Bannerjee	India	1989–1990
Prodosh Kumar Sen	India	1990–1991
Rajat Dutta	India	1991–1994
Azam Monem	India	1994–1997
S. R. Dutt	India	1997–1998
Jaggi Minotra	India	1998–1999
Bikram Das	India	1999–2000
Ranjan Mukherjee	India	2000
Pradeep Guhathakurta	India	2000–2003
Nandan Kumar Chaudhuri	India	2003–2004
Babul Mitter	India	2004–2005
Rajat Dutta	India	2005–2006
Naresh Ojha	India	2006–2008
Chittapriyo Bose	India	2008–2009
Vivek Bhasin	India	2009–2011
Sunny Uthup	India	2011–2012
Shantanu Tewary	India	2012–2014
Daniel Ghaznavi	India	2014–2015
Rajeev Ghosh	India	2015–2016

=== Notable matches of CC&FC cricket team ===
Dates	Against	Venue	Result	Source
23–25 December 1889	(United Kingdom) G. F. Vernon's XI	Eden Gardens, Calcutta	Vernon's XI won by 9 wickets	(Note: At the time, "first-class" was a term in common usage but it was not yet an official standard. It was formally defined in the May 1894 meeting at Lord's of Marylebone Cricket Club (MCC) and the county clubs which were then competing in the County Championship. The ruling was effective from the beginning of the 1895 season)
5–6 January 1892	(United Kingdom) Lord Hawke's XI	CCC Ground, Calcutta	Lord Hawke's XI won by an innings and 83 runs	

== Affiliations and services ==
CC&FC has reciprocal arrangements with over 25 private members clubs around the world, enabling members to use facilities, including notable clubs such as Kowloon Cricket Club and Hong Kong FC of Hong Kong, Penang Sports Club of Malaysia, Royal Bangkok Sports Club of Thailand, Singapore Cricket Club of Singapore, Wanderers Club of South Africa, St James's Club of England, Singhalese Sports Club of Sri Lanka, and Dhaka Club of Bangladesh. In June 2022, the club organized an elite camp for Indian women's footballers, for selection to international football clubs, in which noted teams including ŽNK Dinamo Zagreb, Marbella, Melbourne Victory and Western Sydney Wanderers collaborated. CC&FC has a reciprocal tie-up with a prestigious indigenous association, the Tollygunge Club, and both the teams share a tradition of facing each other once a year in golf and cricket meets.

The club is headquartered in 19/1 Gurusaday Dutt Road, Beckbagan, Ballygunge. As a prestigious gentlemen's club in the city, alongside sporting activities, CC&FC offers numerous recreational facilities to its members, including gymnasium, multi-cuisine dishes. In collaboration with leading daily newspaper The Telegraph (official sponsor of club's Merchant's Cup tournament), CC&FC hosts numerous bonfire parties, European-themed mega carnivals, musical fests and cultural events every single year. The club complex is consisting of centenary hall, public library, swimming pool, glassed balcony-bar, and several sporting grounds. There is also a mini museum of club memorabilia within CC&FC, having jerseys and signed photographs of Stanley Matthews, George Best, Franz Beckenbauer, Gavin Hastings, along with artifacts of colonial antiquities. The club also entered into partnership with Tata Group-run Indian Cancer Society, in supporting underprivileged children fighting to beat cancer.

== See also ==
- Sport in India
- History of cricket in India to 1918 – Historical account
- List of current first-class cricket teams
- Football in Kolkata
- History of Indian football – Overview of the history of association football in India
- List of football clubs in India
- List of football clubs in West Bengal
- Wisden Cricketers' Almanack – British cricket almanac
