= Lord Hawke's cricket team in Ceylon and India in 1892–93 =

International cricket tour (1892–93)

The touring team

An English cricket team led by Lord Hawke toured Ceylon and India in the Indian season of 1892–93. It was the second visit by an English team to India, after G. F. Vernon's XI in 1889–90, and the third to Ceylon.

The team left Tilbury on 14 October 1892 and the tour ended in the first week of March 1893. There were four first-class matches, all of them in India, including the first match ever to involve an All-India XI. In all, they played 23 matches, of which 15 were won, 2 lost and 6 drawn. Three of the matches were played in Ceylon.

Lord Hawke fell ill early on the tour (as he had on the previous tour of 1889–90) and missed matches in Ceylon.

== The team ==
The team consisted of fourteen amateurs, who each paid £150 to take part:

- Lord Hawke (captain)
- Godfrey Foljambe
- Joseph Gibbs
- Arthur Gibson
- Christopher Heseltine
- Ledger Hill
- John Hornsby
- F. S. Jackson
- Albert Leatham
- Montague MacLean
- John Robinson
- George Vernon
- Charles Wright
- Henry Wright

Hawke, Gibson, Hornsby, Leatham and Vernon had all been members of the 1889–90 touring team. Jackson and Hill were students at the University of Cambridge and Jackson had just been appointed as the captain of Cambridge University; he later captained England. Several of the team were good club cricketers rather than regular first-class players.

== Match summary ==
1. 11–12 November at Colombo. Lord Hawke's XI 252; Colombo 106 and 34 for no loss.

Match drawn.

2. 14–15 November at Colombo. Lord Hawke's XI 81 and 107; Colts 24 and 44.

Lord Hawke's XI won by 120 runs.

3. 18–19 November at Radella. Lord Hawke's XI 237; Up-Country XI 82 and 62.

Lord Hawke's XI won by an innings and 93 runs.

4. 28–29 November at Madras. Madras CC 184 and 170 for 6; Lord Hawke's XI 138.

Match drawn.

5. 30 November at Madras. Native XI 29 and 46; Lord Hawke's XI 137 for 5 decl.

Lord Hawke's XI won by an innings and 62 runs.

6. 2–3 December at Madras. Lord Hawke's XI 126 and 112; Madras Presidency 132 and 15 for 2.

Match drawn.

7. 6–7 December at Bangalore. Madras Presidency 203 and 112; Lord Hawke's XI 280 and 36 for 1.

Lord Hawke's XI won by 9 wickets.

8. 9–10 December at Bangalore. Bangalore 51 and 132; Lord Hawke's XI 272.

Lord Hawke's XI won by an innings and 89 runs.

9. 16–17 December at Poona. Poona Gymkhana 84 and 207; Lord Hawke's XI 185.

Match drawn.

10. 22–24 December at Bombay. Parsees 93 and 182; Lord Hawke's XI 83 and 93.

Parsees won by 109 runs (first-class match).

11. 26–28 December at Bombay. Lord Hawke's XI 263 and 35 for 2; Bombay Presidency 157 and 140.

Lord Hawke's XI won by 8 wickets (first-class match).

12. 29–31 December at Bombay. Lord Hawke's XI 139 and 85; Parsees 127 and 90.

Lord Hawke's XI won by 7 runs (first-class match).

13. 5–6 January at Calcutta. Lord Hawke's XI 291; Calcutta Club 116 and 92.

Lord Hawke's XI won by an innings and 83 runs.

14. 13 and 16 January at Calcutta. Lord Hawke's XI 158 and 83 for 6; Bengal Presidency 72 and 268.

Lord Hawke's XI won by 4 wickets.

15. 18–20 January at Mozufferpore. Behar Wanderers 169 and 116; Lord Hawke's XI 90 and 127.

Behar Wanderers won by 68 runs. Gibson played against his teammates in this match; his performances of 33, 55, 4 for 22 and 7 for 43 were the major reason for the touring team's defeat.

16. 23–24 January at Allahabad. Upper India 140 and 92; Lord Hawke's XI 225 and 10 for no loss.

Lord Hawke's XI won by 10 wickets.

17. 26–28 January at Allahabad. All India 139 and 199; Lord Hawke's XI 343.

Lord Hawke's XI won by an innings and 5 runs (first-class match).

18. 31 January–1 February at Oudh. Lord Hawke's XI 315; Oudh 79 and 92.

Lord Hawke's XI won by an innings and 144 runs.

19. 6–7 February at Agra. Agra 108 and 67; Lord Hawke's XI 61 and 115 for 6.

Lord Hawke's XI won by 4 wickets.

20. 16–18 February at Umballa. Lord Hawke's XI 185 and 146; Umballa 145.

Match drawn.

21. 20–21 February at Lahore. Punjab 128 and 111; Lord Hawke's XI 243.

Lord Hawke's XI won by an innings and 4 runs.

22. 23–25 February at Lahore. Lord Hawke's XI 138 and 26 for 3; Sindh 50 and 112.

Lord Hawke's XI won by 7 wickets.

23. 28 February–2 March at Peshawar. Peshawar 68 and 112; Lord Hawke's XI 483.

Lord Hawke's XI won by an innings and 303 runs.

== Leading players ==
Hill was the leading scorer with 767 runs at an average of 30.67. He made the only first-class century, 132 against All India. He also took 69 wickets at 9.16. Jackson made 697 runs at 30.17 and took 69 wickets at 10.27. The leading bowler was Hornsby with 120 wickets at 11.26.

== See also ==
- History of cricket in India to 1918
