= Hylton Philipson =

English cricketer

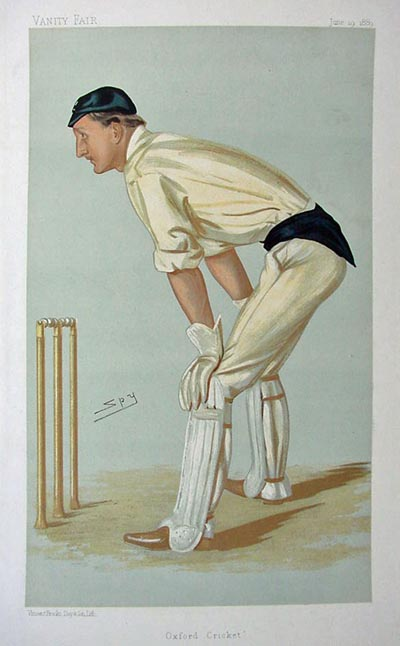
- Philipson as caricatured by Spy (Leslie Ward) in Vanity Fair, June 1889

Cricket information
- Batting: Right-handed
- Role: Wicket-keeper

International information
- National side: England

Career statistics
Competition	Tests	First-class
Matches	5	85
Runs scored	63	1,951
Batting average	9.00	17.41
100s/50s	0/0	2/7
Top score	30	150
Balls bowled	0	0
Wickets	0	0
Bowling average	n/a	n/a
5 wickets in innings	0	0
10 wickets in match	0	0
Best bowling	n/a	n/a
Catches/stumpings	8/3	103/47

Hylton "Punch" Philipson (8 June 1866 in Tynemouth, Northumberland, England – 4 December 1935 (aged 69) at Hyde Park, London, England) was a cricketer who played first-class cricket for Oxford University between 1887 and 1889 and for Middlesex between 1895 and 1898. He played five Test matches for England between 1892 and 1895.

== Cricketing career ==
Throughout his career, Philipson was competing for the wicket-keeper's spot in the English Test side with Gregor MacGregor, which resulted in him playing in only five Test matches for England, which he did on the 1891/92 and 1894/95 tours of Australia. He also toured India with George Vernon in 1889/90, though this tour did not include any Tests.

Philipson went to Eton and had a good record as a schoolboy cricketer before going to Oxford, where he got his blue and where he became captain in 1889. He also represented Oxford at tennis, rackets and Association football. His highest first-class innings was his 150 for the University against Middlesex in 1887, which is when he was selected to play for the Gentlemen at both Lord's and The Oval.

== Family ==
At birth his name was registered as "Hilton Philipson". He was the uncle of multi-talented sportsman Maxwell Woosnam, an Olympic and Wimbledon champion at lawn tennis and one-time captain of the England national football team. Philipson has been described as "one of those late Victorian gentleman amateurs quite indecently blessed by fortune". He owed his own wealth to the Northumbrian coal mines.

Philipson married in 1896 the Honourable Nina Charlotte Murray (1875–1966), daughter of Montolieu Oliphant-Murray, 10th Lord Elibank (later created Viscount Elibank), by his wife Blanche Alice Scott. They had children:

- Nina Clare Philipson (b.1899)
- Hylton Ralph Philipson (b.1902)
- Oliphant James Philipson (b.1905)

He lived at Middleton Hall in Northumberland, but in 1905 bought the estate of Stobo Castle, near Peebles, in the Scottish Borders. Stobo had originally been in the family of Philipson's wife, until their exile following the Jacobite rising of 1745.

== Gardening ==
Philipson was a noted gardener. A visit to Japan on the way back from the Test series in Australia in 1895 inspired him to apply knowledge that he acquired there to the estate of Stobo Castle. The Japanese-style water garden that Philipson created at Stobo between 1909–13 has been maintained, despite a succession of owners after the estate was sold shortly after his death. The Stobo estate was acquired in 1971 by Leo Seymour, whose family still own it (but not the castle), and the Water Gardens are occasionally open to the public.
