= Charles Wright (cricketer) =

English cricketer

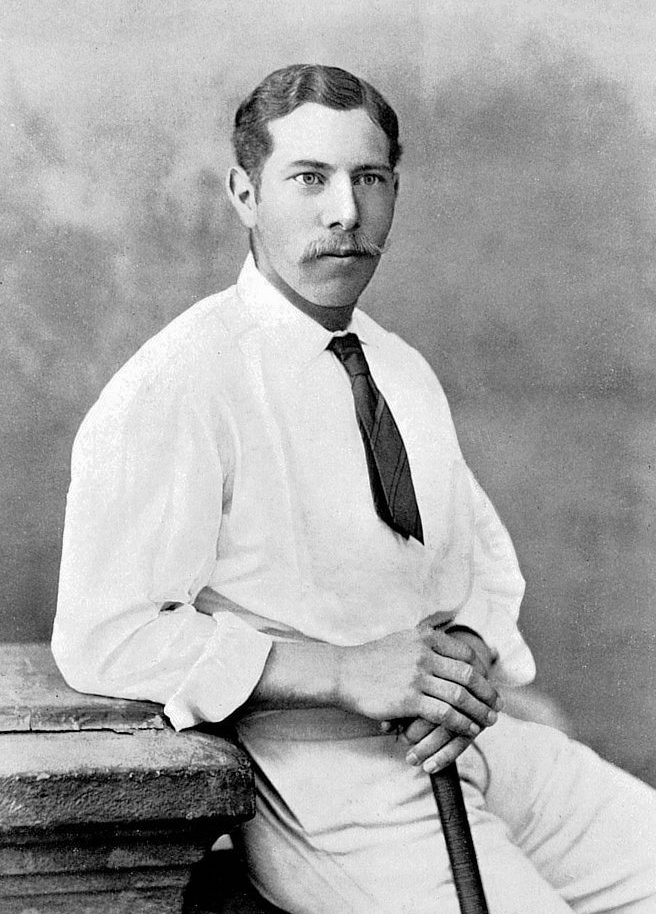

Personal information
- Born: 27 May 1863; Harewood, Yorkshire, England
- Died: 10 January 1936 (aged 72); Saxelby Park, Melton Mowbray, Leicestershire, England
- Batting: Right-handed

International information
- National side: England

Career statistics
Competition	Tests	First-class
Matches	3	265
Runs scored	125	6,989
Batting average	31.25	15.88
100s/50s	0/1	2/30
Top score	71	114
Balls bowled	0	59
Wickets	0	0
Bowling average	–	–
5 wickets in innings	0	0
10 wickets in match	0	0
Best bowling	–	–
Catches/stumpings	0/0	195/40
- Source: Cricinfo

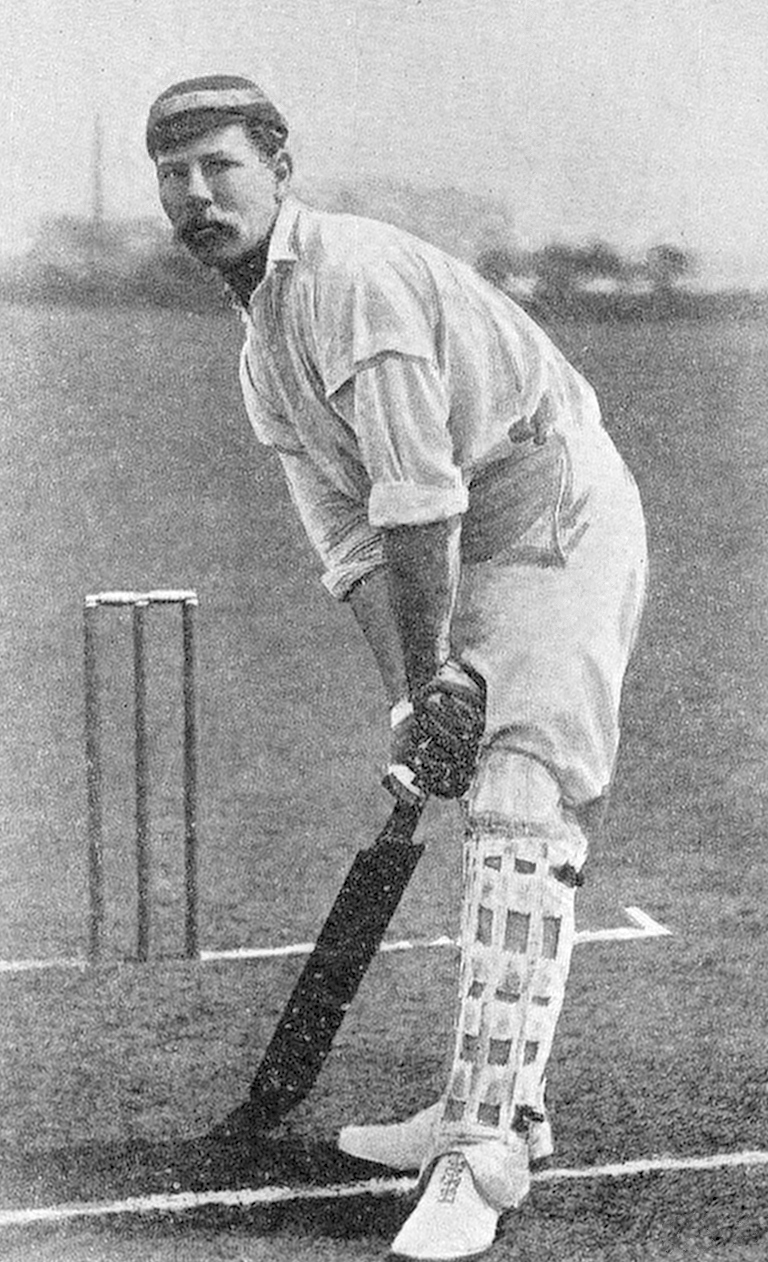
Charles Wright

Charles William Wright (27 May 1863 – 10 January 1936) was an English cricketer who played first-class cricket for Cambridge University between 1882 and 1885 and for Nottinghamshire between 1882 and 1899. Wright also played many first-class cricket games for the Marylebone Cricket Club. His Test match career was limited to three appearances for England against South Africa in 1895-96. Wright was an opening batsman and wicket-keeper.

Wright was educated at Charterhouse and Trinity College, Cambridge.

In total Wright went on four overseas tours, all of which were captained by Lord Hawke. These were to the United States and Canada in 1891 and 1894, to India in 1892-93, and then on the South African tour in which Wright played his Tests.

He is also notable for two other occurrences:

- In 1890 he was the first captain to declare an innings closed. In a game against Kent at the Bat and Ball Ground in Gravesend, Wright declared Nottinghamshire's second innings closed on 157 for 5 to set Kent a target of 231 to win. However, the tactic did not come off as the game was drawn with Kent on 98 for 9 and Nottinghamshire requiring one more wicket to win.
- In 1893 Wright became the fourth batsman to be given out handled the ball after he picked up a ball that had become lodged in his pads and returned it to a fielder.

Wright retired from the game after losing his eye in a shooting accident and later became a long-standing member of the Nottinghamshire Cricket Club's committee.

== See also ==
- Declaration and forfeiture
- Handled the ball

== Notes ==
- ^{1} Cricinfo's page on Wright erroneously states that he was the second batsman to be given out handled the ball rather than the fourth. The first three cases were: J Grundy for the MCC against Kent in 1857, George "Farmer" Bennett for Kent against Sussex in 1872 and William Scotton for Smokers against Non smokers in 1886-7. This sequence is supported by, for example, page 285 of the 2003 Wisden Cricketers' Almanack ISBN 0-947766-77-4
