= John Hornsby (cricketer) =

English cricketer (1860–1926)

John Henry James Hornsby (18 April 1860 – 9 July 1926) was an English cricketer who played first-class cricket from 1887 to 1898 for Middlesex and various amateur teams. He was born in Grantham; died in Cuckfield Park.

Hornsby was educated at Fettes College and Oxford University. A slow left-arm orthodox bowler, he was the leading wicket-taker on the Lord Hawke's XI tour of Ceylon and India in 1892-93, taking 120 wickets in all matches at an average of 11.26.
