= Arthur Gibson (Lancashire cricketer) =

English cricketer

Arthur Buchwald Edgar Gibson (15 June 1863 – 11 March 1932) was an English amateur cricketer active from 1887 to 1896 who played for Lancashire. He was born in Salford and died in Cambridge. He appeared in 14 first-class matches as a righthanded batsman who bowled right arm medium pace. He scored 311 runs with a highest score of 58 and held four catches. He took 16 wickets with a best analysis of three for 24.

Most of Gibson's major cricket was played on the first two English tours of India. He was a member of G. F. Vernon's team in 1889–90, when he was the leading all-rounder, and Lord Hawke's team in 1892–93.
