= Ernest de Little =

Australian cricketer and pastoralist

Personal information
- Full name: Ernest Robert de Little
- Born: 19 June 1868; Melbourne, Victoria, Australia
- Died: 1 October 1926 (aged 58); Caramut, Victoria, Australia
- Batting: Right-handed
- Bowling: Right-arm fast

Domestic team information
- Years: Team
- 1888–1889: Cambridge University

Career statistics
Competition	First-class
Matches	9
Runs scored	104
Batting average	11.55
100s/50s	–/–
Top score	22
Balls bowled	1,093
Wickets	27
Bowling average	20.29
5 wickets in innings	2
10 wickets in match	1
Best bowling	7/27
Catches/stumpings	4/–
- Source: Cricinfo, 20 December 2021

Ernest Robert de Little (19 June 1868 – 1 October 1926) was an Australian first-class cricketer and pastoralist.

de Little was born in Melbourne in June 1868. His father was Henry de Little, a pioneer settler in the Western District of Victoria. He was educated at Geelong Grammar School, from which he departed to travel for two years following the completion of his education. After two years of travel he arrived in England, where he had gained a place at Jesus College at the University of Cambridge. While studying at Cambridge, de Little played first-class cricket for Cambridge University Cricket Club on nine occasions across 1888 and 1889. Playing as a right-arm fast bowler in the Cambridge side, he took 27 wickets at an average of 20.29. He twice took five wickets in an innings and once took ten wickets in a match, with best innings figures of 7 for 27. He was the first Victorian public schoolboy to gain a Cambridge Blue in cricket. In 1890, he toured British India with George Vernon's personal team, though the tour did not feature any first-class matches; however, the tour was pioneering with it being the first visit by an English team to India.

After graduating from Cambridge, de Little returned to Australia to take up pastoral interests at his father's former estate at Caramut, Victoria. The estate had been under the control of trustees from 1871, when his father died, until 1890, when it was divided between Ernest and his elder brother Henry. de Little's share encompassed 8,000 acres. He later sold a portion of his share to his brother and purchased the 9,600-acre Barwidgee Estate, which he considered more convenient to work from. He purchased an additional estate at Port Fairy, with him using both of estates to produce high-quality wool. de Little also had a good reputation as a polo player and a pony breeder, breeding many successful racing ponies. He died at Caramut in October 1926 and was survived by his wife, Ethel, and their son.
