= Sergison =

Sergison is a surname. Notable people with the surname include:

- Charles Sergison (1655–1732), MP for New Shoreham 1698–1702
- Thomas Sergison (1701–1766), MP for Lewes 1747–1766
- Bertram Sergison-Brooke (1880–1967), British Army officer
