= Walter Troup =

English cricketer

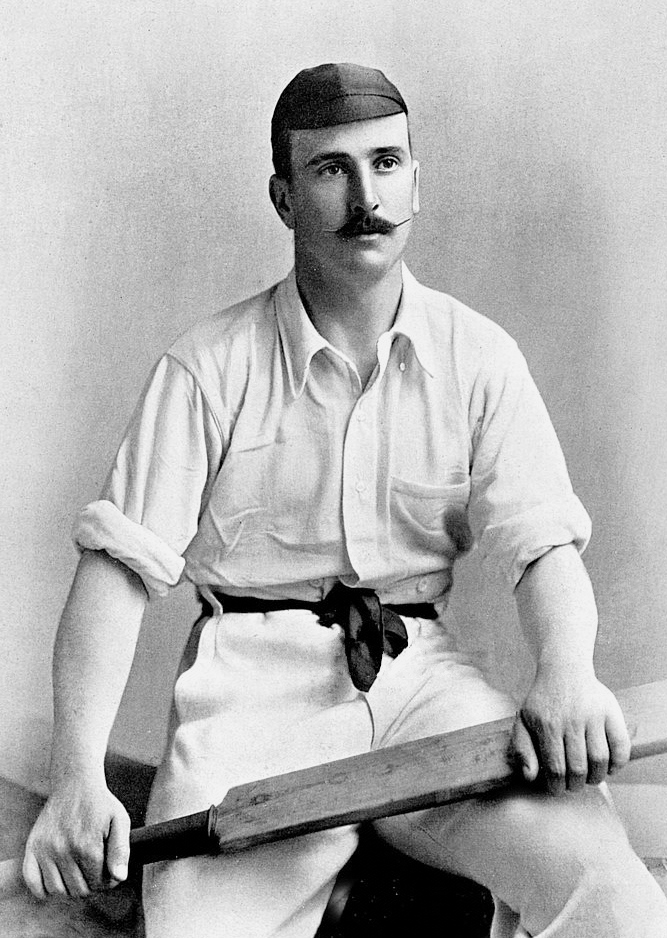
- Troup in about 1895

Personal information
- Born: 16 October 1869; Meerut, British India
- Died: 14 December 1940 (aged 71); Isleworth, England
- Batting: Right-handed

Career statistics
Competition	First-class
Matches	85
Runs scored	3,366
Batting average	26.09
100s/50s	7/12
Top score	180
Balls bowled	8
Wickets	0
Bowling average	–
5 wickets in innings	–
10 wickets in match	–
Best bowling	–
Catches/stumpings	26/0
- Source: CricketArchive

Major Walter Troup (16 October 1869 – 14 December 1940) was an English first-class cricketer who was born in the North-Western Provinces, of British India. He was a member of the inaugural All-India team.

He debuted for Gloucestershire in 1887 at the age of 17. A defensive batsman, it is said that he once batted for 95 minutes against Lancashire during a game in 1888 and didn't score a run. Troup often opened the batting with his captain WG Grace and made his highest score of 180 against Nottinghamshire at Bristol in 1898. When Grace left the county Troup became captain for a season before going back to India. He became District Superintendent of Police in the North-West Provinces of the country and in the war he was a captain in the Royal Flying Corps.
