= Francis Shand =

English cricketer

Personal information
- Full name: Francis Livingstone Shand
- Born: 23 June 1855; Charlton, Kent, England
- Died: 5 June 1921 (aged 65); Denham, Buckinghamshire, England
- Batting: Left-handed
- Bowling: Left-arm fast

Career statistics
Competition	First-class
Matches	5
Runs scored	49
Batting average	12.25
100s/50s	–/–
Top score	17
Balls bowled	438
Wickets	17
Bowling average	9.88
5 wickets in innings	1
10 wickets in match	–
Best bowling	6/32
Catches/stumpings	2/–
- Source: Cricinfo, 23 June 2019

Francis Livingstone Shand (23 June 1855 – 5 June 1921) was an English first-class cricketer.

Shand was born at Old Charlton. He was educated at Harrow School. He made his debut in first-class cricket for the Gentlemen of England against a combined Oxford and Cambridge Universities Past and Present cricket team at The Oval in 1874. Two years later, he appeared twice in first-class cricket, appearing the South in the North v South and for the Gentlemen of the South against the Players of the North. His final two first-class appearances came in 1889 for the Gentlemen of England against Oxford University, and for A. J. Webbe's XI against Cambridge University. In six first-class matches, Shand scored 49 runs with a high score of 17, while with the ball he took 17 wickets at an average of 9.88. His best figures of 6 for 32, which was his only five wicket haul, came against Oxford University in 1889. Outside of cricket, Shand was a land proprietor in British Ceylon. He died in June 1921 at Denham, Buckinghamshire.
