= Albert Leatham =

English cricketer

Personal information
- Full name: Albert Edward Leatham
- Born: 9 August 1859; Wakefield, Yorkshire, England
- Died: 13 July 1948 (aged 88); Christchurch, New Zealand
- Batting: Right-handed

Domestic team information
- Years: Team
- 1883-1897: Gloucestershire
- Source: ESPNcricinfo, 1 April 2014

Albert Leatham (9 August 1859 – 13 July 1948) was an English cricketer. He played for Gloucestershire and Cambridge University between 1883 and 1897.
