= History of cricket in India to 1918 =

Historical account

The sport of cricket was introduced to the Indian subcontinent by sailors and traders of the English East India Company in the 17th and 18th centuries. The earliest known record of cricket in India dates from 1721 and the first club had been founded by 1792. In the 1886 and 1888 summer seasons, the Parsees cricket team toured England. In the winter of 1889–90, a team of English players was the first to tour India, followed by another in the 1892–93 season. That tour coincided with the beginning of competitive cricket in the country as the Parsees won the prestigious Bombay Presidency Match against the Europeans cricket team. By 1912–13, the tournament had become the Bombay Quadrangular with the addition of the Hindus cricket team and the Muslims cricket team. Similar tournaments began soon afterwards in Calcutta and Madras. By the end of 1918, first-class cricket was established in India.

== Early developments ==
The entire history of cricket in the subcontinent (including modern-day India, Pakistan, Bangladesh and Sri Lanka) as a whole is based on the existence and development of the British Raj via the East India Company. On 31 December 1600, Queen Elizabeth I granted a Royal Charter to the English East India Company, often colloquially referred to as "John Company". It was initially a joint-stock company that sought trading privileges in India and the East Indies, but the Royal Charter effectively gave it a 21-year monopoly on all trade in the region. In time, the East India Company transformed from a commercial trading venture to one which virtually ruled India as it acquired auxiliary governmental and military functions, until its dissolution in 1858 following the Indian Mutiny. The East India Company was the means by which cricket was introduced into India.

In 1639, the Company effectively founded the city of Madras (now Chennai), and in 1661 acquired Portuguese territory on the west coast of India that included Bombay (now Mumbai). In 1690, an Anglo-Mughal treaty allowed English merchants to establish a trading settlement on the Hooghly River, which became Calcutta (now Kolkata). All of these places became leading centres of cricket as the popularity of the game grew among the native population.

The British had brought cricket to India by the early 1700s, and the first documented instance of cricket being played anywhere in the sub-continent is a report of English sailors of the East India Company written in 1737. It refers to cricket being played at Cambay, near Baroda in 1721. It was played and adopted by the Kolis of Gujarat. Sea pirates among the Kolis had looted British ships. The East India Company tried to befriend them and, among other things, introduced them to cricket.

The Calcutta Cricket and Football Club was known to be in existence by 1792, but was possibly founded more than a decade earlier. In 1799, another club was formed at Seringapatam in south India after the successful British siege and the defeat of Tipu Sultan.

== Beginning of first-class cricket ==
In 1864, a Madras v. Calcutta match was arguably the start of first-class cricket in India. Indian elites quickly adopted the game, both playing with British teams and with one another.

The most important fixture in the 19th century was the Bombay Presidency Match which evolved, first, into the Bombay Triangular and then into the Bombay Quadrangular. The match was first played in 1877 and then intermittently for several seasons until finally being given first-class status in 1892–93.

An English team led by George Vernon in 1889–90 was the first foreign team to tour India but none of the matches that it played are considered first-class.

The first Indian community which started playing cricket were the Parsees in 1848. By 1892, they became proficient enough to play the Presidency matches against the Europeans.

First-class cricket definitely began in the 1892–93 season with two Europeans v Parsees matches, at Bombay (match drawn) and Poona (Parsees won by 3 wickets). In the same season, Lord Hawke captained an English team that played four first-class matches including a game against "All India" on 26–28 January 1893.

Gradually, with the passage of time other communities also started playing cricket. The Hindus started playing first-class cricket in 1907. The tournament became the Triangular tournament. In 1912, the Muslims also entered the arena of first-class cricket. The tournament was then called the Quadrangular Tournament, with four teams – the Europeans, the Parsees, The Hindus and the Muslims – playing each other.

== Domestic cricket ==
=== Bombay Presidency winners ===
- 1892–93: Parsees
- 1893–94: Europeans
- 1894–95: Europeans shared with Parsees
- 1895–96: Europeans shared with Parsees
- 1896–97: Europeans
- 1897–98: Parsees
- 1898–99: Europeans
- 1899–1900: Europeans shared with Parsees
- 1900–01: Parsees
- 1901–02: Europeans shared with Parsees
- 1902–03: Europeans shared with Parsees
- 1903–04: Parsees
- 1904–05: Parsees
- 1905–06: Hindus shared with Parsees
- 1906–07: Hindus

=== Bombay Triangular winners ===
- 1907–08: Parsees
- 1908–09: Europeans
- 1909–10: Europeans shared with Parsees
- 1910–11: Europeans shared with Hindus
- 1911–12: Parsees

=== Bombay Quadrangular winners ===
- 1912–13: Parsees
- 1913–14: Hindus shared with Muslims
- 1914–15: Hindus shared with Parsees
- 1915–16: Europeans
- 1916–17: Europeans shared with Parsees
- 1917–18: Hindus shared with Parsees

== International cricket ==
The first Indian ventures into international cricket were by the Parsees cricket team which toured England twice in the 1880s. English amateur teams visited India in 1889–90 and 1892–93.

=== G. F. Vernon's XI in India, 1889–90 ===
An English cricket team led by G. F. Vernon toured Ceylon and India in the winter of 1889–90. The team played no first-class matches but it was a pioneering tour being the first visit by an English team to India and the second to Ceylon. In all, the team played 13 matches of which 10 were won, 1 was lost and 2 drawn.

== Sources ==
- Mihir Bose, A History of Indian Cricket, Andre-Deutsch, 1990
- Ramachandra Guha, A Corner of a Foreign Field – An Indian History of a British Sport, Picador, 2001
