= George Vernon (cricketer) =

English cricketer (1856–1902)

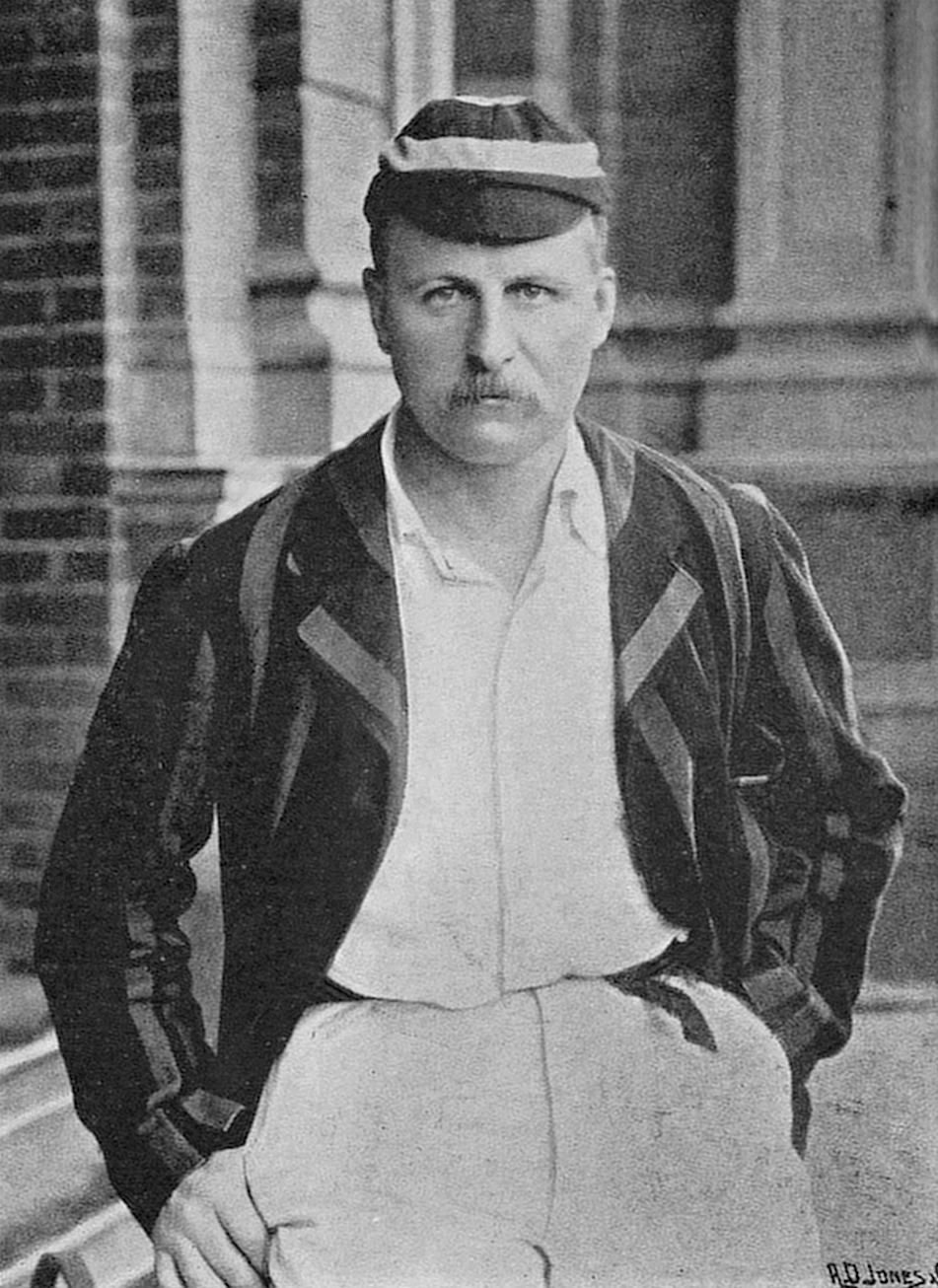
- George Vernon

Personal information
- Born: 20 June 1856; Marylebone, London, England
- Died: 10 August 1902 (aged 46); Elmina, Gold Coast
- Batting: Right-handed
- Bowling: Slow

International information
- National side: England
- Only Test (cap 43): 30 December 1882 v Australia

Career statistics
Competition	Test	First-class
Matches	1	240
Runs scored	14	7,070
Batting average	14.00	19.10
100s/50s	0/0	4/28
Top score	11*	160
Balls bowled	–	108
Wickets	–	2
Bowling average	–	34.50
5 wickets in innings	–	0
10 wickets in match	–	0
Best bowling	–	1/11
Catches/stumpings	0/–	171/–
- Source: ESPNCricinfo, 6 November 2022

George Frederick Vernon (20 June 1856 – 10 August 1902) was an English cricketer who played first-class cricket for Middlesex County Cricket Club. He also played one Test match for England during the first-ever Ashes tour in 1882-83.

== Biography ==
Vernon was the son of George Vernon of 32 Montagu Square. He was educated at Rugby School, and first appeared at Lord's as a member of the Rugby eleven in 1873, and was captain in 1874. He later went on to play 103 first-class games for Middlesex. Besides the 1882–83 tour, he also toured Australia in 1887–88.

Vernon toured India and Ceylon (now Sri Lanka) in 1889-90 as the leader of a team of amateurs, of which the other notable player was Lord Hawke. The other players could not really be said to be first-class, but the team was of a quality much higher than any seen in India at that time. This was the first ever tour by a foreign team to India. They won seven games and drew another before they were due to play the Parsi Gymkhana of Bombay (now Mumbai) on 30 January 1890, just after that great cricket stalwart, Lord Harris, had been named as the next Governor of the Bombay Presidency. The match was billed as being for the "Cricket Championship of India". At the time it was the greatest sporting event to have happened in Bombay, and to the astonishment of the British rulers, the Parsi team won.

Vernon toured India again in 1892-93 as part of a team led by Lord Hawke that also lost to the Parsis. His last first-class game, which was for the Marylebone Cricket Club came in 1898.

He represented the England national rugby union team as a forward on five occasions.

By profession Vernon was a barrister, who was called to the Bar at the Middle Temple. He was engaged in the colonial service, and worked for the West Africa Police in the Gold Coast Colony at the time of his death.

Vernon died aged 46 of malaria fever in the Gold Coast (now Ghana).
