= Field hockey at the 1964 Summer Olympics – Men's team squads =

List of hockey players

The following is the list of squads that took place in the men's field hockey tournament at the 1964 Summer Olympics.

== Group A ==
=== Australia ===
The following players represented Australia:

- John McBryde
- Desmond Piper
- Mervyn Crossman
- Paul Dearing
- Ray Evans
- Brian Glencross
- Robin Hodder
- Don McWatters
- Patrick Nilan
- Eric Pearce
- Julian Pearce
- Donald Smart
- Graham Wood
- Tony Waters
- Don Martin

=== Great Britain ===
The following players represented Great Britain:

- Paul Fishwick (gk) (Harborne)
- John Neill (Bowdon)
- David Judge (Three Rock Rovers)
- David Wilman (Cambridge City)
- Charles Jones (Bishops Stortford)
- Roger Sutton (Beckenham)
- Howard Davis (North Staffordshire)
- Alan Page (Beckenham)
- Jim Deegan (R.A.F.)
- John Cadman (Saffron Walden)
- John Hindle (Preston)
- Christopher Langhorne (Hounslow)
- David Veit (Surbiton)
- Geoffrey Cutter (Ben Rhydding)
- Michael Corby (Hounslow)
- Derek Miller (Old Kingstonians)
- John Land (Richmond)
- Harry Cahill (gk) (Coventry)

=== Japan ===
The following players are from japan

- Hiroshi Miwa
- Tsuneya Yuzaki
- Akio Takashima
- Shigeo Kaoku
- Kunio Iwahashi
- Toshihiko Yamaoka
- Kenji Takizawa
- Junichi Yamaguchi
- Hiroshi Tanaka
- Michio Okabe
- Seiji Kihara
- Katsuhiro Yuzaki
- Tetsuya Wakabayashi

=== Kenya ===
The following players represented Kenya:

- Saude George
- Anthony Vaz
- Avtar Singh Sohal
- Santokh Singh Matharu
- Surjeet Singh Panesar
- Silvester Fernandes
- Hilary Fernandes
- Edgar Fernandes
- Egbert Fernandes
- Reynold D'Souza
- Alu Mendonca
- John Simonian
- Krishnan Kumar Aggarwal
- Amar Singh Mangat
- Leo Fernandes
- Tejparkash Singh Brar

=== New Zealand ===
The following players represented New Zealand:

- Bill Schaefer
- Alan Patterson
- Ian Kerr
- Timothy Carter
- Ross Gillespie
- John Cullen
- Ernie Barnes
- Bruce Judge
- Brian Maunsell
- John Anslow
- Grantley Judge
- Peter Byers
- Phil Bygrave
- Trevor Blake

=== Pakistan ===
The following players represented Pakistan:

- Munir Ahmed Dar
- Manzoor Hussain Atif
- Saeed Anwar
- Anwar Ahmed Khan
- Muhammad Rashid
- Khalid Mahmood
- Khawaja Zaka-ud-Din
- Khurshid Azam
- Muhammad Asad Malik
- Motiullah
- Abdul Hamid
- Tariq Aziz
- Zafar Hayat
- Tariq Niazi
- Muhammad Afzal Manna
- Nawaz Khizar Bajwa

=== Rhodesia ===
The following players represented Rhodesia:

- Dereck Brain
- Beverly Faulds
- Kevin van Blomestein
- John McPhun
- William Turpin
- Tinker Beets
- Ian Mackay
- Roy Barbour
- Lloyd Koch
- Anthony Charles "Tony" Unger
- Robert Robertson
- Robert Ullyett
- Des Tomlinson
- Ronald Spence
- Graham Cumming

== Group B ==
=== Belgium ===
The following players represented Belgium:

- Michel Berger
- Jacques Vanderstappen
- Daniel Moussiaux
- Jacques Rémy
- Jean-Louis le Clerc
- Yves Bernaert
- Guy Miserque
- Claude Ravinet
- André Muschs
- Guy Verhoeven
- Jean-Louis Roersch
- Jean-Marie Buisset
- Franz Lorette
- Michel Muschs
- Freddy Rens
- Eric Van Beuren

=== Canada ===
The following players represented Canada:

- Ron Aldridge
- Victor Warren
- Lee Wright
- Tony Boyd
- John Young
- Ian Johnston
- Patrick Ruttle
- Peter Buckland
- Richard Chopping
- Derrick Anderson
- Allan Raphael
- Gerard Ronan
- Peter Vander Pyl
- Harry Preston

=== Hong Kong ===
The following players represented Hong Kong:

- Slawee Kadir
- Harnam Singh Grewal
- Farid Khan
- Eric McCosh
- Bosco da Silva
- Rui da Silva
- Kuldip Singh Gosal
- Omar Dallah
- Daniel Castro
- Packey Gardner
- Lionel Guterres
- Johnny Monteiro
- Kader Rahman
- Jock Collaquo
- Sarinder Singh Dillon
- Zia Hussain
- Zeca Cunha

=== India ===
The following players represented India:

- Shankar Laxman
- Gurbux Singh
- Dharam Singh
- Mohinder Lal
- Charanjit Singh
- Gindi Singh
- Hari Pal Kaushik
- Harbinder Singh
- Udham Singh
- Darshan Singh
- Prithipal Singh
- Bandu Patil
- V. J. Peter
- Jagjit Singh
- Syed Mushtaq Ali
- Rajendran Christie

=== Malaysia ===
The following players represented Malaysia:

- Ho Koh Chye
- Kandiah Anandarajah
- Manikam Shanmuganathan
- Michael Arulraj
- Doraisamy Munusamy
- Lawrence Van Huizen
- Douglas Nonis
- Chelliah Paramalingam
- Tara Singh Sindhu
- Koh Hock Seng
- Rajaratnam Yogeswaran
- Arumugam Sabapathy
- Ranjit Singh Gurdit
- Kunaratnam Alagaratnam

=== Netherlands ===
The following players represented the Netherlands:

- Joost Boks
- Charles Coster van Voorhout
- John Elffers
- Frans Fiolet
- Jan Piet Fokker
- Jan van Gooswilligen
- Francis van 't Hooft
- Arie de Keyzer
- Leendert Krol
- Jaap Leemhuis
- Chris Mijnarends
- Erik van Rossem
- Nico Spits
- Theo Terlingen
- Jan Veentjer
- Jaap Voigt
- Theo van Vroonhoven
- Frank Zweerts

=== Spain ===
The following players represented Spain:

- Carlos del Coso
- José Colomer
- Julio Solaun
- Juan Ángel Calzado
- José Antonio Dinarés
- Narciso Ventalló
- Ignacio Macaya
- Jaime Amat
- Francisco Amat
- Eduardo Dualde
- Jorge Vidal
- Luis María Usoz
- Pedro Amat
- Jaime Echevarría

=== United Team of Germany ===
The following players represented the United Team of Germany:

- Rainer Stephan
- Axel Thieme
- Klaus Vetter
- Horst Brennecke
- Klaus Bahner
- Horst Dahmlos
- Lothar Lippert
- Rolf Westphal
- Karl-Heinz Freiberger
- Dieter Ehrlich
- Adolf Krause
- Reiner Hanschke
