= India at the 1964 Summer Olympics =

- IOC code: IND
- NOC: Indian Olympic Association

in Tokyo
- Competitors: 53 (52 men, 1 woman) in 8 sports
- Flag bearer: Gurbachan Singh Randhawa
- Medals Ranked 24th: Gold 1 Silver 0 Bronze 0 Total 1

Summer Olympics appearances (overview)
- 1900; 1904–1912; 1920; 1924; 1928; 1932; 1936; 1948; 1952; 1956; 1960; 1964; 1968; 1972; 1976; 1980; 1984; 1988; 1992; 1996; 2000; 2004; 2008; 2012; 2016; 2020; 2024; 2028

Other related appearances
- Pakistan (1948–pres.); Bangladesh (1984–pres.)

India competed at the 1964 Summer Olympics in Tokyo, Japan. 53 competitors, 52 men and 1 woman, took part in 42 events in 8 sports. They were able to win a single medal, the gold, in field hockey.

== Competitors ==
Sports	Men	Women	Total	Events
Athletics	12	1	13	10
Cycling	5	0	5	5
Diving	2	0	2	2
Field hockey	15	0	15	1
Gymnastics	6	0	6	8
Shooting	2	0	2	1
Weightlifting	2	0	2	2
Wrestling	8	0	8	13
Total	52	1	53	42

== Medalists ==
=== Gold ===
- Charanjit Singh (captain), Shankar Lakshman, Rajendran Christie, Prithipal Singh, Dharam Singh, Gurbux Singh, Mohinder Lal, Jagjit Singh, Joginder "Gindi" Singh, Haripal Kaushik, Harbinder Singh, Bandu Patil, Victor John Peter, Udham Singh, Darshan Singh and Syed Mushtaq Ali — Field hockey, Men's Team Competition.

== Athletics ==
Men's 110 metres hurdles

- Gurbachan Singh Randhawa

- Final — 14.09s (5th place)

Men's 200 metres

- Kenneth Powell

- Heat — 21.19s

Men's marathon

- Balkrishan Akotkar

- Qualification Round — 2:29:27 (33rd place)

Men's marathon

- Harbans Lal

- Qualification Round — 2:37:05 (43rd place)

Men's Triple Jump

- Labh Singh

- Qualification Round — 14:95 (26th place)

Men's long jump

- S. Bondada Venkata

- Qualification Round — 6.76 (28th place)

Men's 4 × 100 m Relay

- Anthony Francis Coutinho, Makhan Singh, Kenneth Powell, and Rajasekaran Pichaya

- Round 1 – 40.6
- Semifinal – 40.5 (did not advance)

== Cycling ==
Five cyclists represented India in 1964.

Team time trial

- Amar Singh Billing, Chetan Singh Hari, Dalbir Singh Gill, and Amar Singh Sokhi

Sprint

- Suchha Singh
- Amar Singh Billing

1000m time trial

- Dalbir Singh Gill

Individual pursuit

- Amar Singh Sokhi

Team pursuit

- Amar Singh Billing, Chetan Singh Hari, Dalbir Singh Gill, and Amar Singh Sokhi

== Diving ==
Men

Athlete	Event	Preliminary		Final			
Athlete	Event	Points	Rank	Points	Rank	Total	Rank
Ansuya Prasad	3 m springboard	69.04	25	Did not advance			
Sohan Singh	10 m platform	74.18	30	Did not advance			

== Field hockey ==
=== Pool B ===
Pos	Team	Pld	W	D	L	GF	GA	GD	Pts	Qualification
1	India	7	5	2	0	18	4	+14	12	Advanced to Semi-finals
2	Spain	7	4	3	0	16	3	+13	11	Advanced to Semi-finals
3	Netherlands	7	4	1	2	20	4	+16	9	
4	United Team of Germany	7	2	5	0	9	4	+5	9	
5	Malaysia	7	2	2	3	11	13	−2	6	
6	Belgium	7	2	2	3	10	13	−3	6	
7	Canada	7	1	0	6	5	25	−20	2	
8	Hong Kong	7	0	1	6	3	26	−23	1	

Source: FIH
Rules for classification: 1) points; 2) goal difference; 3) games won; 4) head-to-head result.

11 October 1964
14:15

India	2–0	Belgium
Prithipal 61'; Kaushik 67'	Report

Umpires:
T.C. Bedelis (AUS)
James McDowell (AUS)

12 October 1964
10:00

United Team of Germany	1–1	India
Freiberger 21'	Report	Prithipal 54'

Umpires:
Henry Douglas Kelly (NZL)
Jan Nieulant Pelkman (GBR)

14 October 1964
11:40

India	1–1	Spain
Mohinder 55'	Report	Dualde 37'

Umpires:
Hideo Ichikawa (JPN)
Takashi Matsunawa (JPN)

15 October 1964
14:15

Hong Kong	0–6	India
	Report	Pritiphal 20', 42'; Darshan 39', 50'; Harbinder 40', 46'

Umpires:
Kendrick Eaves (GBR)
T.C. Bedelis (AUS)

17 October 1964
10:00

India	3–1	Malaysia
Prithipal 13', 53'; Harbinder 61'	Report	Van Huizen 68'

Umpires:
Baynard Handley (GBR)
Jan Nieulant Pelkman (GBR)

18 October 1964
10:00

Canada	0–3	India
	Report	Harbinder 12', 66'; Prithipal 50'

Umpires:
Lyle Thomson (GBR)
Jan Nieulant Pelman (GBR)

19 October 1964
14:15

India	2–1	Netherlands
Prithipal 10'; Peter 58'	Report	Fiolet 44'

Umpires:
Baynard Handley (GBR)
Kendrick Eaves (GBR)

=== Semifinals ===
21 October 1964
13:55

India	3–1	Australia
Prithipal 22', 25'; Mohinder 23'	Report	Nilan 11'

Umpires:
A. Fransois Lathouwers (NED)
Walter Schinner (GER)

=== Gold-medal match ===
23 October 1964
14:20

Pakistan	0–1	India
	Report	Mohinder 40'

Umpires:
Walter Schinner (GER)
A. Fransois Lathouwers (NED)

== Shooting ==
Two shooters represented India in 1964.

Trap

- Karni Singh

- Qualification Round — 186 (26th place)

- Devi Singh

- Qualification Round — 168 (49th place)

== Wrestling ==
Key:

- VT - Victory by Fall.
- Pt - Decision by Points.
- Pd - Decision by Points but Judges disagree.

Men's Freestyle

Athlete	Event	Round 1 Result	Round 2 Result	Round 3 Result	Round 4 Result	Round 5 Result	Round 6 Result	Rank
Malwa Singh	−52 kg	Paul Neff (EUA); W ^{Pt}	Ernest P. Fernando (CEY); W ^{Pt}	Elliott Gray Simons (USA); L ^{Pt}	Ali Aliev (URS); L ^{VT}	did not advance		-
Bishambar Singh	−57 kg	Rubén Leibovich (ARG); W ^{VT}	Bazaryn Sükhbaatar (MGL); W ^{Pt}	Moises Lopez Ruiz (MEX); W ^{Pt}	David Camillo Auble (USA); L ^{Pt}	Hüseyin Akbaş (TUR); L ^{Pt}	did not advance	6
Bandu Patil	−63 kg	Tauno Antero Jaskari (FIN); Draw	Bobby E. Douglas (USA); L ^{VT}	did not advance				-
Udey Chand	−70 kg	Arto Savolainen (FIN); W ^{Pt}	Enyu Valchev (BUL); L ^{VT}	Zarbeg Beriashvili (URS); L ^{Pt}	did not advance			-
Madho Singh	−78 kg	Julio Ricardo Graffigna (ARG); W ^{Pt}	İsmail Ogan (TUR); L ^{Pt}	Leonard John Allen (GBR); W ^{Pt}	Guliko Sagaradze (URS); L ^{Pt}	did not advance		-
Jit Singh	−87 kg	Rudolf Kobelt (SUI); W ^{VT}	Prodan Stoyanov Gardjev (BUL); L ^{VT}	did not advance				-
Maruti Mane	−97 kg	Peter Jutzeler (SUI); L ^{Pt}	Heinz Kiehl (EUA); W ^{Pt}	Imre Vígh (HUN); L ^{Pt}	did not advance			-
Ganpat Andalkar	+97 kg	Denis Mcnamara (GBR); W ^{Pt}	Ştefan Stingu (ROU); L ^{VT}	Bohumil Kubát (TCH); L ^{VT}	did not advance		—N/a	-

Men's Greco-Roman

Athlete	Event	Round 1 Result	Round 2 Result	Round 3 Result	Round 4 Result	Round 5 Result	Round 6 Result	Rank
Malwa Singh	−52 kg	Angel Stoyanov Kerezov (BUL); Draw	did not advance				—N/a	-
Bishambar Singh	−57 kg	Moises Lopez Ruiz (MEX); W ^{Pt}	Vladlen Trostyansky (URS); L ^{Pt}	Unver Basergil (TUR); L ^{Pt}	did not advance		—N/a	-
Bandu Patil	−63 kg	Joseph Mewis (BEL); L ^{VT}	Kazimierz Macioch (POL); L ^{Pt}	did not advance				-
Ganpat Andalkar	−87 kg	Richard Wayne Baughman (USA); L ^{Pt}	did not advance					-
Maruti Mane	−97 kg	Ferenc Kiss (HUN); L ^{VT}	did not advance				—N/a	-
