= Ravinet =

Ravinet is a surname. Notable people with the surname include:

- Claude Ravinet (born 1943), Belgian field hockey player
- Jaime Ravinet, Chilean politician
