= Ron Aldridge =

Ron Aldridge may refer to:

- Ron Aldridge (field hockey) (born 1933), Canadian field hockey player
- Ron Aldridge (politician) (born 1950), member of the Mississippi House of Representatives
