= Field hockey at the 1962 Asian Games =

- Venue: Senayan Hockey Stadium
- Location: Jakarta, Indonesia
- Dates: 25 August – 3 September
- Teams: 9

Medalists
gold medal	Pakistan (2nd title)
silver medal	India
bronze medal	Malaya

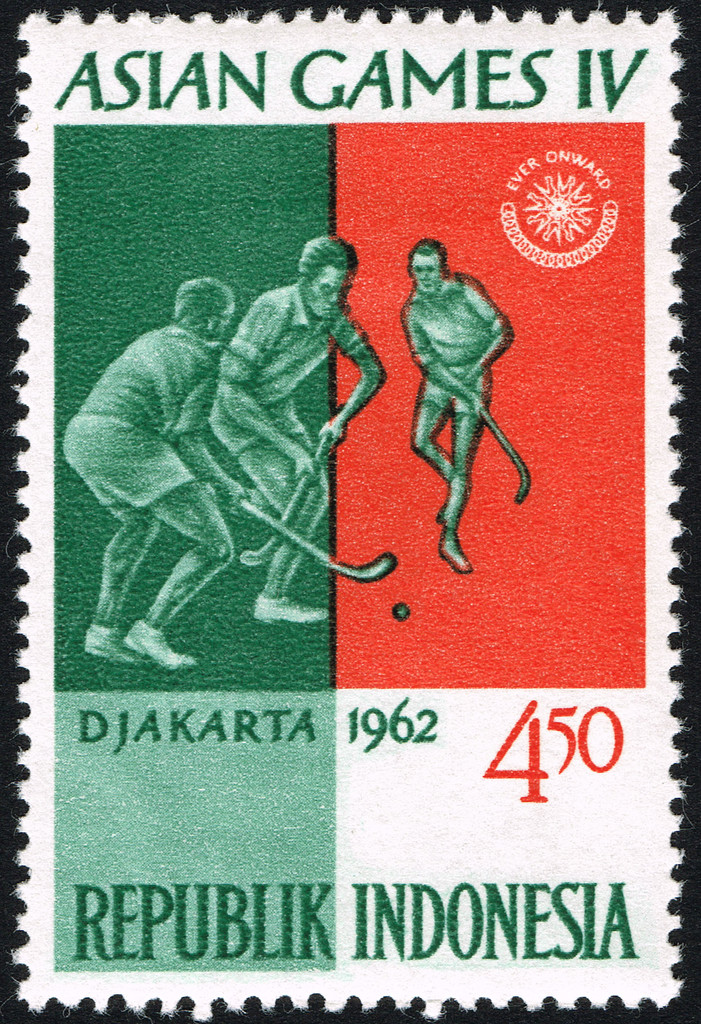
Field hockey at the 1962 Asian Games on a stamp of Indonesia

The men's field hockey event at the 1962 Asian Games was the second edition of the field hockey event for men at the Asian Games.

It was held at the Senayan Hockey Stadium in Jakarta, Indonesia from 25 August to 3 September 1962. In this tournament, 9 teams played in the men's competition.

The defending champions Pakistan won its second gold medal by defeating India 2–0 in the final. The two finalists had remained undefeated throughout the tournament. Malaya won its first-ever medal by defeating Japan 2–0 in the bronze medal match.

== Medalists ==
Event	Gold	Silver	Bronze
Men	Pakistan; Bashir Ahmed; Noor Alam; Manzoor Hussain Atif; Tariq Aziz; Naseer Bunda; Munir Dar; Zafar Hayat; Mazhar Hussain; Zakir Hussain; Anwar Ahmed Khan; Motiullah Khan; Habib Ali Kiddie; Muhammad Asad Malik; Hayat Muhammad; Tariq Niazi; Chaudhry Ghulam Rasool; Abdul Waheed; Khwaja Zakauddin	India; Joseph Antic; Erman Bastian; Rajendran Christie; V. Deshmukh; Abdul Hamid; Shankar Lakshman; Hiranna M. Nimal; Bandu Patil; Jaman Lal Sharma; Charanjit Singh; Darshan Singh; Gurdev Singh; Gurmit Singh; Joginder Singh; Madan Mohan Singh; Piara Singh; Prithipal Singh	Malaya; Ismail Ali; Kandiah Anandarajah; Michael Arulraj; Chua Eng Wah; Ho Koh Chye; Robin Jayesuria; Doraisamy Munusamy; Chelliah Paramalingam; Arumugam Sabapathy; Aboo Samah; Manikam Shanmuganathan; Mike Shepherdson; Mani Sockalingam; Mohd Hariff Taib; Lawrence Van Huizen; Rajaratnam Yogeswaran

== Draw ==
The draw for hockey competition was held on 14 August 1962.

Group A

- India
- Malaya
- South Korea
- Hong Kong

Group B

- Pakistan
- Japan
- Indonesia
- Ceylon
- Singapore

== Results ==
=== Preliminary round ===
==== Group A ====
Pos	Team	Pld	W	D	L	GF	GA	GD	Pts	Qualification
1	India	3	3	0	0	12	0	+12	6	Semi-finals
2	Malaya	3	2	0	1	9	4	+5	4	Semi-finals
3	Hong Kong	3	1	0	2	2	8	−6	2	
4	South Korea	3	0	0	3	1	12	−11	0	

26 August 1962

India	3–0	Malaya
Bastian 33', 45', 65'

Umpires:
McDowell (AUS)
Matsumowa (JPN)

26 August 1962

South Korea	0–2	Hong Kong

28 August 1962

Malaya	5–1	South Korea

28 August 1962

India	4–0	Hong Kong
Bastian 3'; Pr. Singh 16', 25', 50'	Report

30 August 1962

India	5–0	South Korea
Pr. Singh ?', 15', 45'; Bastian ?'; Gurd. Singh ?'	Report

30 August 1962

Malaya	4–0	Hong Kong

==== Group B ====
Pos	Team	Pld	W	D	L	GF	GA	GD	Pts	Qualification
1	Pakistan	4	4	0	0	26	1	+25	8	Semi-finals
2	Japan	4	2	1	1	8	6	+2	5	Semi-finals
3	Singapore	4	2	1	1	6	6	0	5	
4	Ceylon	4	1	0	3	4	15	−11	2	
5	Indonesia (H)	4	0	0	4	2	18	−16	0	

(H) Hosts

25 August 1962

Indonesia	1–3	Ceylon
Sitaldas 4'	Report	Visuvasalingam Rajaratnam 6', 30'; Girange Jayatissa 68'

25 August 1962

Pakistan	5–0	Japan

26 August 1962

Japan	1–1	Singapore

27 August 1962

Ceylon	1–9	Pakistan
Donald Abeysekera 52'	Report	Waheed 1', 4', 19', 20', ?'; Alam 17'; Bunda; Dar; Motiullah

27 August 1962

Indonesia	1–2	Singapore

29 August 1962

Pakistan	4–0	Singapore
Bunda 1', 70'; Waheed 28'; Dar 53'

29 August 1962

Ceylon	0–2	Japan

30 August 1962

Indonesia	0–8	Pakistan

31 August 1962

Ceylon	0–3	Singapore
	Report	Mehar Singh 12'; Cyril Dewitt 39'; Douglas Nunis 60'

31 August 1962

Japan	5–0	Indonesia

=== Medal round ===
Semi-finals
2 September
India	7
Japan	0
2 September
Pakistan	5
Malaya	0

Final
3 September
India	0
Pakistan	2
Third place
3 September
Japan	0
Malaya	2

==== Semi-finals ====
2 September 1962

India	7–0	Japan
Patil 3'; Bastian ?', ?', ?'; Pr. Singh ?', ?'

2 September 1962

Pakistan	5–0	Malaya
Waheed 3', 12', 51'; Bunda 18', 58'

==== Bronze medal match ====
3 September 1962

Japan	0–2	Malaya

==== Gold medal match ====
3 September 1962
13:30

India	0–2	Pakistan
		Atif 33'; Waheed 39'

Umpires:
McDowell (AUS)
Kelly (NZL)

== Final standings ==
Pos	Team	Pld	Pts
1	Pakistan	6	12
2	India	5	8
3	Malaya	5	6
4	Japan	6	5
5	Singapore	4	5
6	Hong Kong	3	2
7	Ceylon	4	2
8	South Korea	3	0
9	Indonesia (H)	4	0

(H) Hosts
