= Hockey at the 1964 Olympics =

Hockey at the 1964 Olympics may refer to:

- Ice hockey at the 1964 Winter Olympics
- Field hockey at the 1964 Summer Olympics
