= Manzoor Hussain =

Manzoor Hussain may refer to:

- Manzoor Hussain (field hockey) (1958–2022), gold medalist at the 1984 Summer Olympics
- Manzoor Hussain Atif (1928–2008), field hockey gold medalist at the 1960 Rome Olympics
