= Rainer Stephan =

German field hockey player

Rainer Ernst Stephan (born 17 February 1943) is a German former field hockey player who competed at the 1964 Summer Olympics and the 1968 Summer Olympics. He was born in Chemnitz, Saxony, Germany.

== Olympic events ==
1964 Summer Olympics in Tokyo, competing for the United Team of Germany:

- Men's field hockey – 5th place

1968 Summer Olympics in Mexico City, competing for East Germany:

- Men's field hockey – 11th place
