= Rui da Silva (field hockey) =

Macau-born Hong Kong hockey player

Personal information
- Full name: Rui Ayres da Silva
- Nationality: Hong Konger
- Born: 5 January 1939 (age 87) Portuguese Macau

Sport
- Sport: Field hockey
- Club: Club de Recreio

Rui da Silva (born 5 January 1939) is a Macau-born Hong Kong field hockey player. He competed in the men's tournament at the 1964 Summer Olympics.
