= Zia Hussain =

Hong Kong field hockey player

Personal information
- Nationality: Hong Konger
- Born: 1 July 1938 (age 87)

Sport
- Sport: Field hockey

Zia Hussain (born 1 July 1938) is a Hong Kong field hockey player. He competed in the men's tournament at the 1964 Summer Olympics.
