= Toshihiko Yamaoka =

Japanese hockey player

Personal information
- Nationality: Japanese
- Born: 11 September 1941 (age 84) Hiroshima, Japan

Sport
- Sport: Field hockey

Toshihiko Yamaoka (born 11 September 1941) is a Japanese field hockey player. He competed in the men's tournament at the 1964 Summer Olympics.
