= Bosco da Silva =

Macau-born Hong Kong hockey player

Personal information
- Full name: João Bosco Quevado da Silva
- Nationality: Hong Konger
- Born: 8 March 1937 Portuguese Macau
- Died: 27 May 2013 (aged 76) São Paulo, Brazil

Sport
- Sport: Field hockey
- Club: Macau Hockey Club; Club Recreio

João Bosco Quevado da Silva (8 March 1937 – 27 May 2013) was a Macau-born Hong Kong field hockey player. He competed in the men's tournament at the 1964 Summer Olympics.

da Silva attended school at Pedro Nolasco Commercial School and emigrated to Hong Kong in 1956, where he worked for HSBC before turning his hobby for hockey into a full-time job.
