= Guy Verhoeven =

Belgian field hockey player (1938–2020)

Personal information
- Nationality: Belgian
- Born: 18 March 1938 Antwerp, Belgium
- Died: 31 July 2020 (aged 82)

Sport
- Sport: Field hockey

Guy Verhoeven (18 March 1938 – 31 July 2020) was a Belgian field hockey player. He competed in the men's tournament at the 1964 Summer Olympics.
