= Jaman Lal Sharma =

Indian field hockey player (1932–2007)

Medal record

Representing India

Men's Field hockey

Olympic Games
Silver medal – second place	1960 Rome	Team

Asian Games
Silver medal – second place	1962 Jakarta	Team

Jaman Lal Sharma (1932–2007) was an Indian field hockey player. He won a silver medal at the 1960 Summer Olympics in Rome.

Sharma was born in Bannu, North-West Frontier Province, British India, in what is now Khyber Pakhtunkhwa, Pakistan, in 1932. After retiring as a player, Sharma became a coach and was manager of the Indian hockey team at the Asian Games.

The Government of India awarded him the fourth highest civilian award of Padma Shri in 1990. Sharma died on 26 August 2007, aged 75, following the complications developed after a fall in his bathroom. He had three daughters and a son, Deepak Sharma, who is a journalist.

In Lucknow, a state hockey tournament is being organized every year since 2008 in his memory.
