= Jock Collaquo =

Macau-born Hong Kong hockey player

Personal information
- Full name: Joaquim José Collaquo
- Nationality: Hong Konger
- Born: 17 March 1934 Portuguese Macau
- Died: 9 January 2012 (aged 77)

Sport
- Sport: Field hockey
- Club: Club de Recreio

Joaquim José "Jock" Collaquo (17 March 1934 – 9 January 2012) was a Macau-born Hong Kong field hockey player. He competed in the men's tournament at the 1964 Summer Olympics.
