= Kader Rahman =

Hong Kong hockey player (1938–2024)

Personal information
- Nationality: Hong Konger
- Born: 29 December 1938
- Died: 16 December 2024 (aged 85)

Sport
- Sport: Field hockey

Kader Rahman (29 December 1938 – 16 December 2024) was a Hong Kong field hockey player. He competed in the men's tournament at the 1964 Summer Olympics. Rahman died on 16 December 2024, at the age of 85.
