= John Peter (field hockey) =

Indian field hockey player (1937–1998)

Personal information
- Full name: Victor John Peter
- Born: 19 June 1937 Madras (now Chennai), Madras Presidency (now in Tamil Nadu), British India
- Died: 30 June 1998 (aged 61) Chennai, Tamil Nadu, India

Sport
- Sport: Field hockey
- Position: Halfback
Senior career
Years	Team	Caps	Goals
–	Madras Engineer Group	-	-
–	Services	-	-
National team
Years	Team	Caps	Goals
–	India		-
Medal record
Men's field hockey
Representing India
Olympic Games
Silver medal – second place	1960 Rome	Team
Gold medal – first place	1964 Tokyo	Team
Bronze medal – third place	1968 Mexico	Team
Asian Games
Gold medal – first place	1966 Bangkok	Team

Victor John "V. J." Peter (19 June 1937 – 30 June 1998) was an Indian professional field hockey player. A three-time Olympian who played as a halfback, he was a part of the Indian national team that won the silver, gold and bronze medals respectively in the 1960, the 1964 and the 1968 Olympic Games. Peter's brother Victor Philips was a member of the 1975 World Cup winning team.

== Early life and career ==
Born in Madras (now Chennai), Peter represented his employer Madras Engineer Group, and Services at the club level. He was renowned for his "dribbling skills, ball control and playmaking" and was called by former teammates Harbinder Singh and Inam-ur Rahman as "one of the best inside-rights India ever produced". Another former teammate Gurbux Singh credited him as having been the "architect of India's triumph over Pakistan in the 1964 Tokyo Olympics final." Peter was also instrumental in India's gold medal winning campaign at the 1966 Asian Games. Following his death in June 1998, another former teammate Charles Cornelius recalled, "Peter was pure magic, and I will never forget the combination of Mohinder Lal, Joginder and Peter." M. P. Ganesh felt he was a "very artistic player and his passing was accurate and well-timed."
