= Grantley Judge =

New Zealand field hockey player

Personal information
- Nationality: New Zealand
- Born: 7 May 1940 (age 85) Timaru, New Zealand

Sport
- Sport: Field hockey

Grantley Judge (born 7 May 1940) is a New Zealand field hockey player. He competed in the men's tournament at the 1964 Summer Olympics.
