= Zeca Cunha =

Hong Kong hockey player

Personal information
- Full name: José Policarpo da Cunha
- Nationality: Hong Konger
- Born: 12 August 1935
- Died: 10 September 2013 (aged 78) Canada

Sport
- Sport: Field hockey

José Policarpo da Cunha, known as Zeca Cunha (12 August 1935 – 10 September 2013) was a Hong Kong field hockey player. He competed in the men's tournament at the 1964 Summer Olympics.
