= Sarinder Singh Dillon =

Hong Kong hockey player (born 1946)

Personal information
- Nationality: Hong Konger
- Born: 11 December 1946 (age 79) British Hong Kong

Sport
- Sport: Field hockey
- Club: Nav Bharat Club, Hong Kong

Sarinder Singh Dillon (born 11 December 1946) is a Hong Kong field hockey player. He competed in the men's tournament at the 1964 Summer Olympics.
