= Peter Buckland =

Canadian hockey player

Personal information
- Born: 21 March 1941 (age 85) Grande Prairie, Alberta, Canada

Sport
- Sport: Field hockey

Peter Buckland (born 21 March 1941) is a Canadian field hockey player.

Buckland was raised near the University of British Columbia. Buckland competed in the men's tournament at the 1964 Summer Olympics. He became president of the British Columbia Field Hockey Association in 1971. Buckland became president of the Canadian Field Hockey Association in 1974 and remained in the position until 1977. He was inducted into the Field Hockey Canada Hall of Fame in 2020.
