= Brian Maunsell (field hockey) =

New Zealand hockey player

Personal information
- Full name: Brian Robert Maunsell
- Born: 16 October 1935 Whangārei, New Zealand
- Died: 12 February 1987 (aged 51) Whangārei, New Zealand
- Height: 1.82 m (6 ft 0 in)
- Weight: 71 kg (157 lb)

Sport
- Country: New Zealand
- Sport: Field hockey

Brian Robert Maunsell (16 October 1935 – 12 February 1987) was a New Zealand field hockey player. He competed in the men's tournament at the 1964 Summer Olympics.

Maunsell later worked for the University of Otago in the School of Physical Education, Sport and Exercise Sciences.

Maunsell died on 12 February 1987. The Brian Maunsell Memorial Service to Sport Award, presented annually by Sport Northland, is named in his honour.
