= Jeroen Zweerts =

Dutch field hockey player

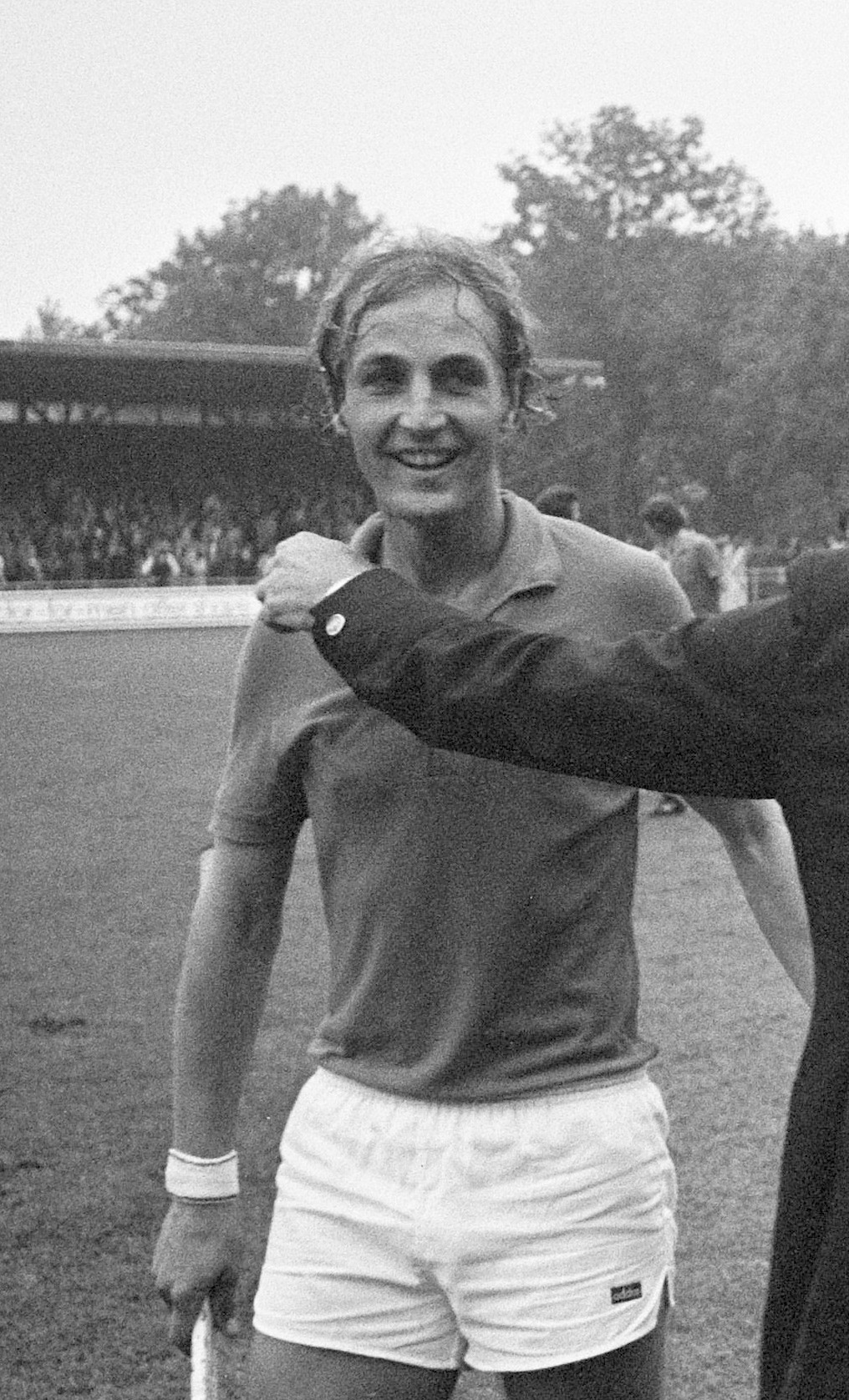
- Jeroen Zweerts in 1973

Personal information
- Born: 3 February 1945 (age 81) Helmond, the Netherlands
- Height: 1.83 m (6 ft 0 in)
- Weight: 80 kg (180 lb)

Sport
- Sport: Field hockey
- Club: SCHC, Bilthoven
Medal record
Representing the Netherlands
Hockey World Cup
Gold medal – first place	1973 Amstelveen	Team

Jeronemus Johannes "Jeroen" Zweerts (born 3 February 1945) is a retired field hockey player from the Netherlands. He played seven matches and scored one goal at the 1972 Summer Olympics, where his team finished in fourth place. He was part of the Dutch team that won the World Cup in 1973.

Jeroen's elder brother Frank competed in field hockey at the 1964 Summer Olympics.
