= Tara Singh Sindhu =

Malaysian field hockey player (born 1943)

Personal information
- Nationality: Malaysian
- Born: 19 July 1943 (age 82)

Sport
- Sport: Field hockey

Tara Singh Sindhu (born 19 July 1943) is a Malaysian field hockey player. He competed in the men's tournament at the 1964 Summer Olympics.
