= Axel Thieme =

German field hockey player

Axel Hermann Thieme (born 15 May 1939; died 17 March 2006 in Leipzig) is a German former field hockey player who competed at the 1964 Summer Olympics and the 1968 Summer Olympics. He was born in Leipzig, Saxony, Germany.

== Olympic events ==
1964 Summer Olympics in Tokyo, competing for the United Team of Germany:

- Men's field hockey – 5th place

1968 Summer Olympics in Mexico City, competing for East Germany:

- Men's field hockey – 11th place
