= Farid Khan (field hockey) =

Hong Kong field hockey player (1936–2021)

Personal information
- Nationality: Hong Konger
- Born: 18 February 1936
- Died: 13 May 2021 (aged 85)

Sport
- Sport: Field hockey

Farid Khan (18 February 1936 – 13 May 2021) was a Hong Kong field hockey player. He competed in the men's tournament at the 1964 Summer Olympics.

Khan died on 13 May 2021, at the age of 85.
