= Jaime Echevarría =

Spanish field hockey player (born 1937)

Personal information
- Nationality: Spanish
- Born: 31 October 1937 (age 88) Getxo, Spain

Sport
- Sport: Field hockey

Jaime Echevarría (born 31 October 1937) is a Spanish field hockey player. He competed in the men's tournament at the 1964 Summer Olympics.
