= David Veit (field hockey) =

British field hockey player (born 1938)

Personal information
- Born: 21 October 1938 (age 87) Wandsworth, London, England
- Height: 166 cm (5 ft 5 in)
- Weight: 66 kg (146 lb)

Sport
- Sport: Field hockey
- Position: Inside-right
Senior career
Years	Team	Caps	Goals
1962–1971	Surbiton	-	-
National team
Years	Team	Caps	Goals
–	Great Britain		-
–	England		-

David Michael Veit (born 21 October 1938) is a British field hockey player. He competed in the men's tournament at the 1964 Summer Olympics.

== Biography ==
Veit played club hockey for Surbiton Hockey Club.

He made his England debut against Wales in April 1964, although he had previously been capped by Great Britain during their tour of India.

He represented Great Britain at the 1964 Olympic Games in Tokyo.
