= John McPhun =

Zimbabwean cricketer

Personal information
- Full name: John David McPhun
- Born: 8 September 1940 (age 86); Salisbury, Rhodesia
- Batting: Right-handed
- Role: Batsman

Domestic team information
- Years: Team
- 1960–1972: Rhodesia cricket team

Career statistics
Competition	First-class	List A
Matches	33	3
Runs scored	1,514	13
Batting average	29.11	4.33
100s/50s	3/6	0/0
Top score	154	9
Catches/stumpings	31/–	3/–
- Source: CricketArchive, 15 August 2022

John David McPhun (born 8 September 1940) was a Rhodesian first-class cricketer who played for the Rhodesia cricket team in the South African Currie Cup.

McPhun struggled early in his career, making just 147 runs from his first eight first-class matches, with a highest score of 39. After a 2 1/2-year absence he returned to the side for a fixture against Border in the 1963/64 Currie Cup and, opening the batting with Ray Gripper, scored 131. Rhodesia went on to win the match by an innings and 74 runs. Scores in the following two matches of 93 and 69* respectively saw him finish the season with an average of 106.00.

His form again fell away and in his next 11 matches could only manage two half centuries. McPhun however remained in the Rhodesian team and came good in 1970/71 with 525 runs at 75.00 in first-class matches, including 453 runs at 75.50 in the Currie Cup. He made his highest first-class score of 154 in a match against Orange Free State at Bloemfontein in 1970.

He was also a Rhodesian field hockey international and competed at the 1964 Summer Olympics in Tokyo. His teammates included fellow cricketers Lloyd Koch and Robert Ullyett.
