= Daniel Castro (field hockey) =

Hong Kong hockey player (born 1937)

Personal information
- Full name: Daniel Francisco Castro
- Nationality: Hong Konger
- Born: 3 July 1937 (age 88)

Sport
- Sport: Field hockey

Daniel Francisco Castro (born 3 July 1937) is a Hong Kong field hockey player. He competed in the men's tournament at the 1964 Summer Olympics.
