= Eric McCosh =

Hong Kong field hockey player

Personal information
- Full name: Frederic Samuel McCosh
- Nationality: Hong Konger
- Born: 6 January 1938 (age 88)

Sport
- Sport: Field hockey

Frederic Samuel "Eric" McCosh (born 6 January 1938) is a Hong Kong field hockey player. He competed in the men's tournament at the 1964 Summer Olympics.

McCosh received a Colonial Police Medal when he was the senior superintendent of police of the Royal Hong Kong Police Force.

He became the commissioner of the Correctional Services Department of Hong Kong on 26 November 1990.
