= Packey Gardner =

Hong Kong hockey player

Personal information
- Full name: Benjamin Packey Gardner
- Nationality: Hong Konger
- Born: 29 May 1929
- Died: 20 May 2012 (aged 82)

Sport
- Sport: Field hockey

Packey Gardner (29 May 1929 – 20 May 2012) was a Hong Kong field hockey player. He competed in the men's tournament at the 1964 Summer Olympics.
