= Erik van Rossem =

Dutch field hockey player

Personal information
- Nationality: Dutch
- Born: 12 October 1938 (age 87) Rotterdam, Netherlands

Sport
- Sport: Field hockey

Erik van Rossem (born 12 October 1938) is a Dutch field hockey player. He competed in the men's tournament at the 1964 Summer Olympics.
