= Timothy Carter (field hockey) =

New Zealand field hockey player

Personal information
- Nationality: New Zealand
- Born: 24 June 1944 (age 81) Whangārei, New Zealand

Sport
- Sport: Field hockey

Timothy Carter (born 24 June 1944) is a New Zealand field hockey player. He competed in the men's tournament at the 1964 Summer Olympics.
