= Peter Vander Pyl =

Canadian field hockey player (1933–2019)

Personal information
- Nationality: Canadian
- Born: 9 November 1933 Netherlands
- Died: 25 April 2019 (aged 85) Creston, British Columbia, Canada

Sport
- Sport: Field hockey

Peter Vander Pyl (9 November 1933 – 25 April 2019) was a Canadian field hockey player. He competed in the men's tournament at the 1964 Summer Olympics.
