= Charles Coster van Voorhout =

Dutch field hockey player

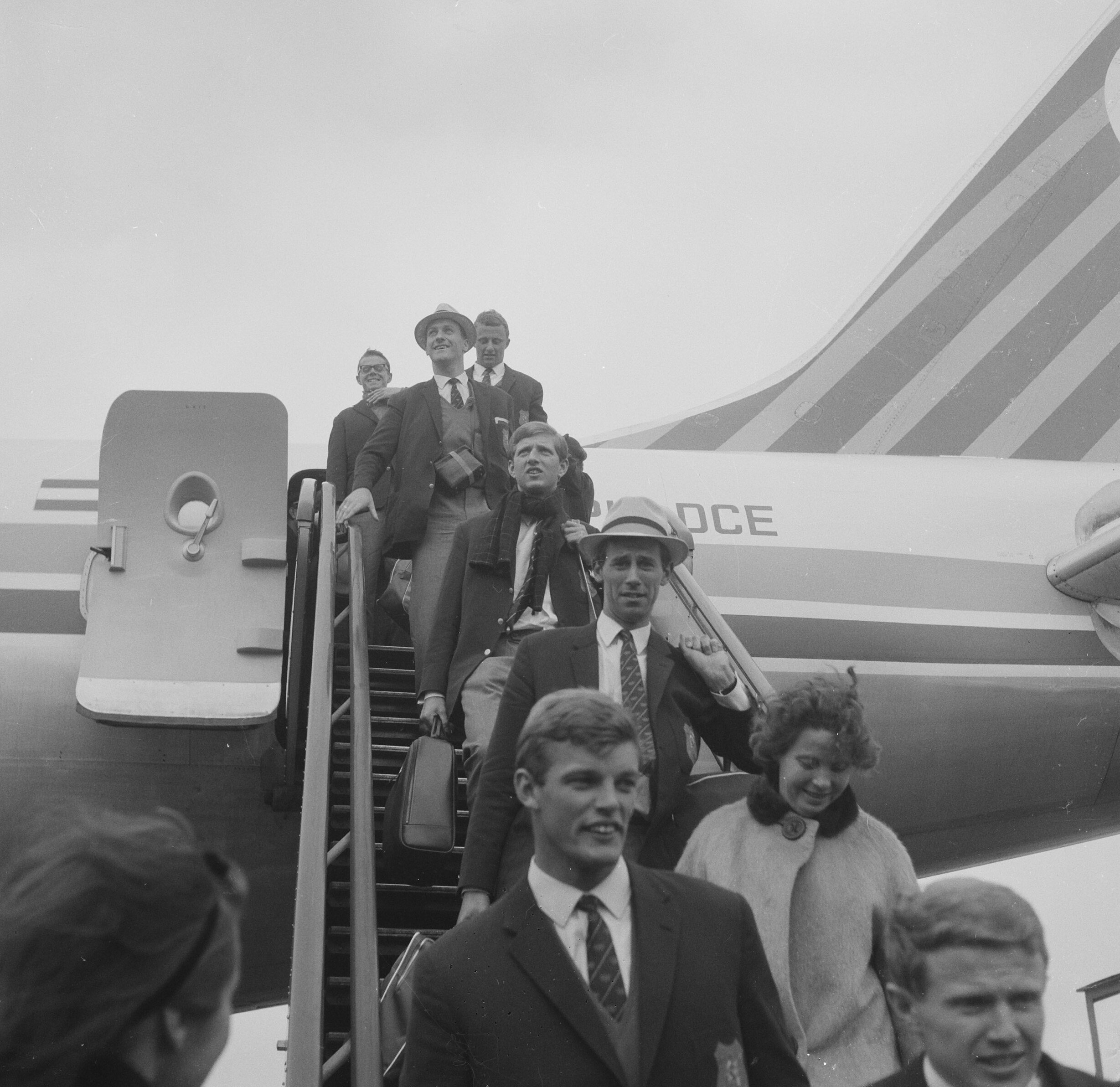
- Coster van Voorhout and Dutch team (1964)

Personal information
- Full name: Charles Victor Coster van Voorhout
- Nationality: Dutch
- Born: 31 March 1942 Amstelveen, Netherlands
- Died: 26 November 2016 (aged 74)

Sport
- Sport: Field hockey

Charles Victor Coster van Voorhout (31 March 1942 – 26 November 2016) was a Dutch field hockey player and journalist. He competed in the men's tournament at the 1964 Summer Olympics. After his hockey career, Coster van Voorhout became a journalist with NRC Handelsblad and authored a book on Cees de Jong, a member of the dutch resistance in Bloemendaal.

== Career ==
Coster van Voorhout made his debut in the Amsterdamsche Hockey & Bandy Club in 1958 at the age of 17. That season, Amsterdam earned promotion to the Hoofdklasse. Coster van Voorhout was part of the team that won the national championship in 1962. He had made his international debut in 1959, in a match against Spain. He would play in total 7 international matches for the Netherlands, including at the 1964 Olympics.

Coster van Voorhout joined NRC as a journalist. Together with Hans Hoffmann he wrote Verzet in Bloemendaal, a book on Dutch resistance in Bloemendaal. The book was used for a movie script.
