= Jaap Voigt =

Dutch field hockey player

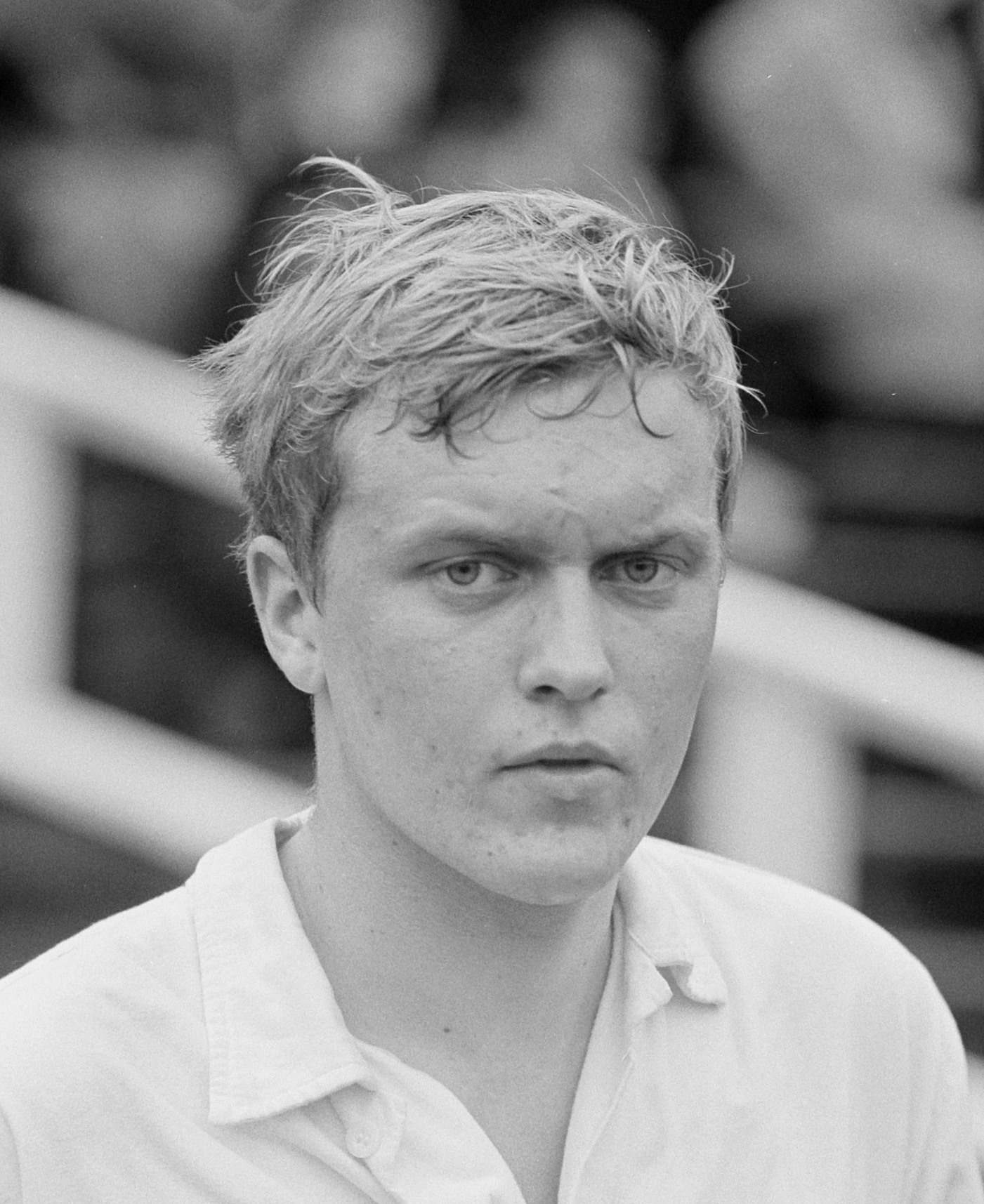
- Jaap Voigt in 1963

Personal information
- Born: 7 June 1941 (age 85) Amsterdam, the Netherlands
- Height: 1.82 m (6 ft 0 in)
- Weight: 78 kg (172 lb)

Sport
- Sport: Field hockey
- Club: AB&HC, Amsterdam

Jacob "Jaap" Voigt (born 7 June 1941) is a retired field hockey player from the Netherlands. He competed at 1964 Summer Olympics, where his team finished in seventh place. With three goals in five games, Voigt was the second best Dutch scorer at those games, after Frank Zweerts.
