= Chetan Singh Hari =

Indian cyclist

Personal information
- Born: 14 September 1936 (age 90)

Cycling career
- Sport: Cycling

Chetan Singh Hari (born 14 September 1936) is an Indian former cyclist. He competed in the team time trial and the team pursuit events at the 1964 Summer Olympics.
