= Raymond Evans (field hockey) =

Australian field hockey player

Olympic medal record

Men's field hockey

Representing Australia
Silver medal – second place	1968 Mexico City	Team competition
Bronze medal – third place	1964 Tokyo	Team competition

Raymond Evans (28 September 1939 – 7 November 1974) was an Australian field hockey player who competed in the 1960 Summer Olympics, in the 1964 Summer Olympics, and in the 1968 Summer Olympics.
