= Robin Hodder =

Australian field hockey player

Olympic medal record

Men's Field Hockey

Representing Australia
Bronze medal – third place	1964 Tokyo	Team competition

Robin Godfrey Hodder (1 October 1937 – 19 March 2006) was a field hockey player from Australia, who won the bronze medal with the Men's National Team at the 1964 Summer Olympics in Tokyo, Japan.
