= Michael Arulraj =

Malaysian field hockey player (born 1938)

Personal information
- Nationality: Malaysian
- Born: 22 May 1938 (age 88)

Sport
- Sport: Field hockey
Medal record
Men's field hockey
Representing Malaya
Asian Games
Bronze medal – third place	1962 Jakarta	Team

Michael Arulraj (born 22 May 1938) is a Malaysian former field hockey player. He competed at the 1964 Summer Olympics and the 1968 Summer Olympics.
