= Donald McWatters =

Australian field hockey player

Personal information
- Full name: Donald James McWatters
- Nickname: Don
- Born: 23 January 1941 (age 85) Maryborough, Queensland
Medal record
Men's field hockey
Representing Australia
Olympic Games
Bronze medal – third place	1964 Tokyo	Team competition

Donald James McWatters (born 23 January 1941) is a former field hockey player from Australia, who won the bronze medal with the Men's National Team at the 1964 Summer Olympics in Tokyo, Japan.
