= Ron Aldridge (field hockey) =

Canadian hockey player (born 1933)

Personal information
- Full name: Ronald Charles Aldridge
- Nationality: Canadian
- Born: 8 July 1933 (age 92) Madras, British India

Sport
- Sport: Field hockey

Ronald Charles Aldridge (born 8 July 1933) is a Canadian field hockey player. He competed in the men's tournament at the 1964 Summer Olympics.
