= Desmond Piper =

Australian field hockey player

Olympic medal record

Men's field hockey

Representing Australia
Silver medal – second place	1968 Mexico City	Team competition
Bronze medal – third place	1964 Tokyo	Team competition

Desmond Piper (born 11 October 1941) is an Australian former field hockey player who competed in the 1964 Summer Olympics, in the 1968 Summer Olympics, and in the 1972 Summer Olympics.
