= Dalbir Singh Gill =

Indian cyclist

Personal information
- Born: 25 November 1936 (age 89)

Cycling career
- Sport: Cycling

Dalbir Singh Gill (born 25 November 1936) is a former Indian Olympic cyclist. He competed in the 1000m time trial, team pursuit and team time trial events at the 1964 Summer Olympics.
