= John Elffers =

Dutch hockey player

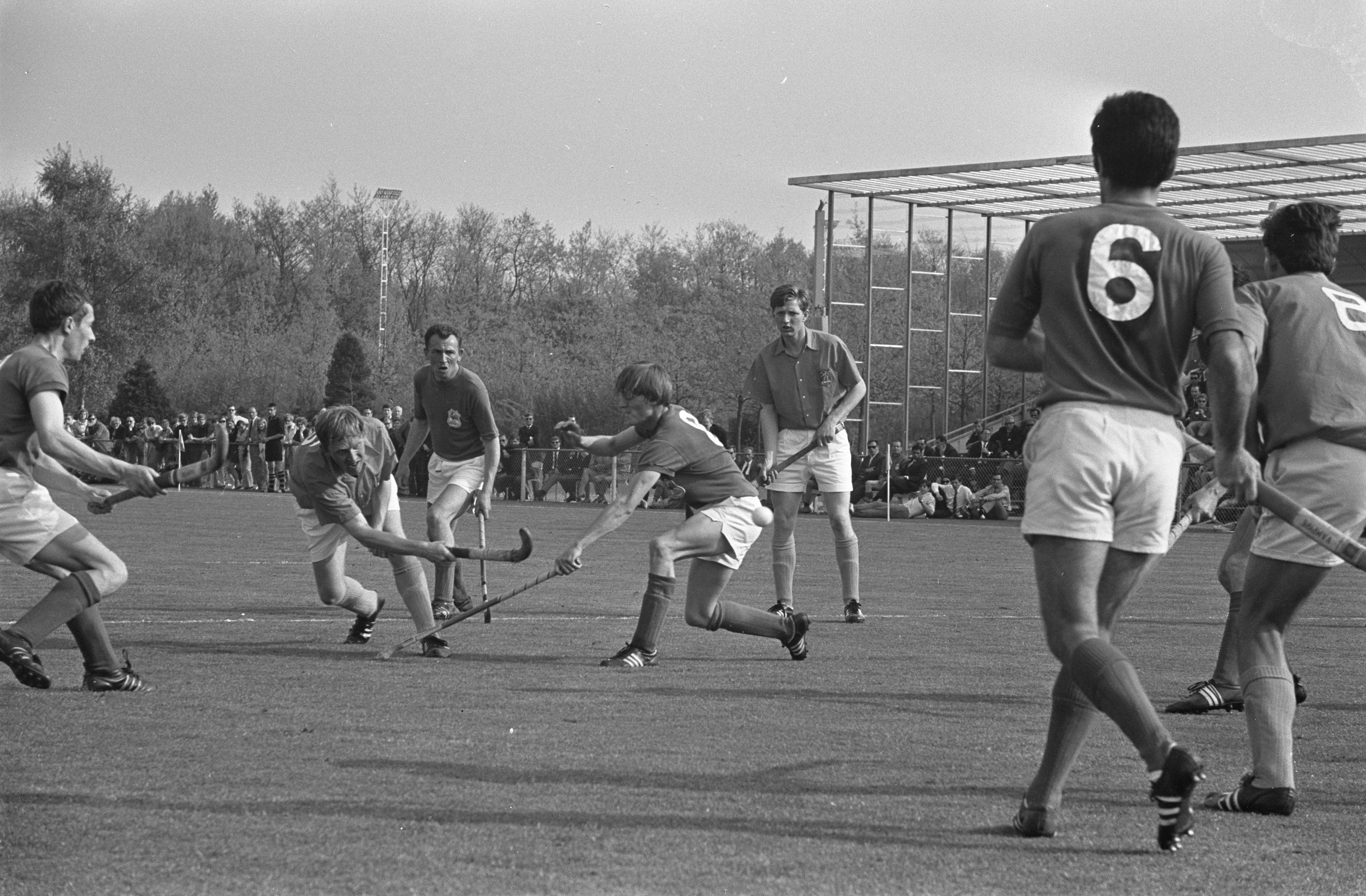
- Elffers scores against France (1968)

Personal information
- Nationality: Dutch
- Born: 24 December 1943 (age 82) The Hague, Netherlands

Sport
- Sport: Field hockey

John Elffers (born 24 December 1943) is a Dutch former field hockey player. He competed at the 1964 Summer Olympics and the 1968 Summer Olympics.
