= Lionel Guterres =

Hong Kong hockey player

Personal information
- Full name: Lionel Hadriano Guterres
- Nationality: Hong Konger
- Born: 7 September 1931 (age 94) Shanghai, Republic of China

Sport
- Sport: Field hockey

Lionel Guterres (born 7 September 1931) is a Hong Kong field hockey player. He competed in the men's tournament at the 1964 Summer Olympics.
