= John McBryde (field hockey) =

Australian field hockey player

Olympic medal record

Men's field hockey

Representing Australia
Bronze medal – third place	1964 Tokyo	Team competition

John McBryde (born 9 March 1939, Maryborough, Queensland) is an Australian field hockey player who competed in the 1960 Summer Olympics and Captained the team in the 1964 Summer Olympics, winning the first Australian hockey medal, a bronze.
