= Abdul Hamid II (field hockey) =

Pakistani field hockey player

Abdul Hamid
Personal information
- Born: 7 July 1942 (age 83)
Medal record
Men's field hockey
Representing Pakistan
Olympic Games
Silver medal – second place	1964 Tokyo	Team competition
Asian Games
Silver medal – second place	1966 Bangkok	Team competition

Abdul Hamid (born 7 July 1942) is a Pakistani field hockey player who played for the Pakistan men's national field hockey team. He was part of the national team who won the silver medal in 1964 Summer Olympics. He won the silver medal again at the 1966 Asian Games.
