= Don Martin (field hockey) =

Australian field hockey player

Personal information
- Full name: Donald Martin
- National team: Australia
- Born: 8 February 1940 (age 86) Kuala Lumpur, Malaysia
Medal record
Men's field hockey
Representing Australia
Olympic Games
Bronze medal – third place	1964 Tokyo	Team competition
Silver medal – second place	1968 Mexico	Team competition

Donald Martin (born 8 February 1940) is a former Australian field hockey player. He represented Australia at the 1964 (winning Bronze) and 1968 (winning Silver) Summer Olympics. Don was inducted as a member of the Western Australian Hockey Champions on 23 May 2010.

== Biography ==
Don was born in Kuala Lumpur, moving to Australia in 1951 to attend boarding school at Aquinas College in Perth, where he was a member of the First XI Hockey team for 6 years from 1952 to 1957. He was selected in the state under 16 boys team in 1954/55. After leaving school, Don began playing in the West Australian Hockey Association First Division Competition.

In 1959, Don was selected to play in the state under 21 colts team, and then the state senior team in 1960-65 and 1968. He first represented Australia in 1961 playing in a winning Manning Memorial Cup victory over New Zealand, and then continued playing for Australia from 1962 to 1964 and 1968. He was chosen in the 1964 Olympic team winning Bronze, and four years later in Mexico, winning Silver.

He was an Australian Badged Umpire and also a Western Australian State Senior Hockey Selector.
