= Amar Singh Mangat =

Kenyan field hockey player (1935–2022)

Personal information
- Nationality: Kenyan
- Born: 26 May 1935 Naro Moru, British Kenya
- Died: 28 September 2022 (aged 87) Calgary, Alberta, Canada

Sport
- Sport: Field hockey
- Club: Simba Union, Nairobi

Amar Singh Mangat (26 April 1935 – 28 September 2022) was a Kenyan field hockey player. He competed in the men's tournament at the 1964 Summer Olympics.
