= Rolf Westphal =

German hockey player (1931–2022)

Personal information
- Nationality: German
- Born: 12 January 1931 Kahla, Germany
- Died: 2 November 2022 (aged 91)

Sport
- Sport: Field hockey

Rolf Westphal (12 January 1931 – 2 November 2022) was a German field hockey player. He competed in the men's tournament at the 1964 Summer Olympics. Westphal died on 2 November 2022, at the age of 91.
