= Anthony Waters (field hockey) =

Australian field hockey player

Olympic medal record

Men's Field Hockey

Representing Australia
Bronze medal – third place	1964 Tokyo	Team competition

Anthony "Tony" Waters (10 April 1928 – 20 November 1987) was a field hockey player from Australia, who won the bronze medal with the Men's National Team at the 1964 Summer Olympics in Tokyo, Japan.
