= John Young (field hockey) =

Canadian hockey player (born 1934)

Personal information
- Full name: John Gilbert Young
- Nationality: Canadian
- Born: 22 February 1934 (age 92) Oxfordshire, England

Sport
- Sport: Field hockey

John Gilbert Young (born 22 February 1934) is a Canadian field hockey player. He competed in the men's tournament at the 1964 Summer Olympics.
