= Doraisamy Munusamy =

Malaysian field hockey player (born 1937)

Personal information
- Nationality: Malaysian
- Born: 2 October 1937 (age 88)

Sport
- Sport: Field hockey
Medal record
Men's field hockey
Representing Malaya
Asian Games
Bronze medal – third place	1962 Jakarta	Team

Doraisamy Munusamy (born 2 October 1937) is a Malaysian former field hockey player. He competed in the men's tournament at the 1964 Summer Olympics.
