= Khurshid Azam =

Pakistani field hockey player (born 1942)

Azam Khurshid
Personal information
- Nationality: Pakistani
- Born: 16 June 1942 (age 84)

Sport
- Sport: Field hockey
Medal record
Men's field hockey
Representing Pakistan
Olympic Games
Silver medal – second place	1964 Tokyo	Team competition

Khurshid Azam (born 16 June 1942) is a Pakistani former field hockey player. He competed in the 1964 Summer Olympics, where he was a member of the silver medal winning team.

He is the elder brother of hockey player Akhtar-ul-Islam, who is best known for scoring the only goal in the final of the inaugural Hockey World Cup against the hosts Spain in 1971.
