= Arumugam Sabapathy =

Malaysian field hockey player (born 1935)

Personal information
- Nationality: Malaysian
- Born: 21 December 1935 (age 90)

Sport
- Sport: Field hockey
Medal record
Men's field hockey
Representing Malaya
Asian Games
Bronze medal – third place	1962 Jakarta	Team

Arumugam Sabapathy (born 21 December 1935) is a Malaysian former field hockey player. He competed at the 1964 Summer Olympics and the 1968 Summer Olympics. He won the team hockey bronze medal match at the 1962 Asian Games, defeating Japan 2–0.
