= Chelliah Paramalingam =

Malaysian field hockey player (1935–2025)

Personal information
- Nationality: Malaysian
- Born: 15 November 1935 Taiping, Perak, Federated Malay States, British Malaya
- Died: 12 December 2025 (aged 90)

Sport
- Sport: Field hockey
Medal record
Men's field hockey
Representing Malaya
Asian Games
Bronze medal – third place	1962 Jakarta	Team

Chelliah Paramalingam (15 November 1935 – 12 December 2025) was a Malaysian field hockey player. He competed in the men's tournament at the 1964 Summer Olympics. Paramalingam died on 12 December 2025, at the age of 90.
