= Graham Wood (field hockey) =

Australian field hockey player

Olympic medal record

Men's field hockey

Representing Australia
Bronze medal – third place	1964 Tokyo	Team competition

Graham Wood (born 24 June 1936) is an Australian former field hockey player who competed in the 1960 Summer Olympics and in the 1964 Summer Olympics.
