= Khizar Nawaz Bajwa =

Pakistani field hockey player

Personal information
- Nationality: Pakistani
- Born: 20 September 1942 (age 83) Lyallpur, Punjab, British India now Faisalabad, Punjab, Pakistan

Sport
- Sport: Field hockey
Medal record
Men's field hockey
Representing Pakistan
Olympic Games
Silver medal – second place	1964 Tokyo	Team competition
Asian Games
Silver medal – second place	1966 Bangkok	Team competition

Khizar Nawaz Bajwa (born 20 September 1942) is a Pakistani former field hockey player who represented the country internationally. He competed in the 1964 Summer Olympics, where he was a member of the silver-medal-winning team.

== Birth ==
Khizar Nawaz Bajwa was born in Chak No. 279 RB Raja Nadir Khan Wali in Lyallpur district. Now this place falls within the city limit of Faisalabad and thus called Chak No. 279 RB City.
