= Muhammad Afzal Manna =

Pakistani field hockey player

Personal information
- Nationality: (United Kingdom) British Indian (1938-1947) (Pakistan) Pakistani (1947-2017)
- Born: 10 December 1938 (age 87) Amritsar, Punjab, British India
- Died: 11 November 2017 Lahore, Punjab, Pakistan
- Height: 1.73 m (5 ft 8 in)
- Weight: 76 kg (168 lb)

Sport
- Sport: Field hockey
Medal record
Men's field hockey
Representing Pakistan
Olympic Games
Silver medal – second place	1964 Tokyo	Team competition

Muhammad Afzal Manna (born 10 December 1938) was a Pakistani former field hockey player. He competed in the 1964 Summer Olympics, where he was a member of the silver-medal-winning team.
