= Johnny Monteiro =

Hong Kong hockey player

Personal information
- Full name: John Jude Monteiro
- Nationality: Hong Konger
- Born: 28 November 1938 (age 87)

Sport
- Sport: Field hockey

John Jude "Johnny" Monteiro (born 28 November 1938) is a Hong Kong field hockey player. He competed in the men's tournament at the 1964 Summer Olympics.
