= Khawaja Zakauddin =

Pakistani field hockey player (1936–2026)

Khawaja Zakauddin, PP
Personal information
- Born: 27 October 1936 Jalandhar, Punjab Province, British India
- Died: 1 October 2026 (aged 89) Lahore, Punjab, Pakistan
Medal record
Men's field hockey
Representing Pakistan
Olympic Games
Gold medal – first place	1960 Rome	Team competition
Silver medal – second place	1964 Tokyo	Team competition
Asian Games
Gold medal – first place	1958 Tokyo	Team competition
Gold medal – first place	1962 Jakarta	Team competition
Silver medal – second place	1966 Bangkok	Team competition

Khawaja Zakauddin, PP (Urdu: خواجہ ذکاء الدین; 27 October 1936 – 1 October 2026) was a Pakistani field hockey forward who played from 1958 to 1966. He represented Pakistan in 56 International matches and scored 26 goals in his career. In 2009, he was given the Pride of Performance award, the highest civil award of Pakistan. After his retirement, he served as coach, chief selector and manager for Pakistan hockey at different times.

Pakistani hockey Olympian Touqir Dar is his son-in-law. Zakauddin has left behind four sons: Kamran Zaka, Adnan Zaka, Imran Zaka, and Salmam Zaka.

Zakauddin died on 1 October 2026, at the age of 89.

== See also ==
- Pakistan Hockey Federation
