= Douglas Nonis =

Malaysian field hockey player (1937–2023)

Personal information
- Nationality: Singaporean, Malaysian (1963-1965)
- Born: 25 January 1937
- Died: 12 June 2023 (aged 86) Singapore

Sport
- Sport: Field hockey

Douglas Nonis (25 January 1937 – 12 June 2023) was a Singaporean field hockey player. He competed with Malaysia in the men's tournament at the 1964 Summer Olympics. Nonis died in Singapore on 12 June 2023, at the age of 86.
