= Donald Smart =

Australian field hockey player

Personal information
- Full name: Donald Boddington Smart
- Nickname: Don
- National team: Australia
- Born: 7 January 1942 (age 84) Taungoo, Bago, British Burma
Medal record
Men's field hockey
Representing Australia
Olympic Games
Silver medal – second place	1968 Mexico City	Team competition
Bronze medal – third place	1964 Tokyo	Team competition

Donald Boddington Smart (born 7 January 1942) is an Australian former field hockey player. He attended Kent Street Senior High School. He competed in the 1964 Summer Olympics, in the 1968 Summer Olympics, and in the 1972 Summer Olympics.
