= Kandiah Anandarajah =

Malaysian field hockey player (born 1938)

Personal information
- Nationality: Malaysian
- Born: 4 December 1938 (age 87)

Sport
- Sport: Field hockey
Medal record
Men's field hockey
Representing Malaya
Asian Games
Bronze medal – third place	1962 Jakarta	Team

Kandiah Anandarajah (born 4 December 1938) is a Malaysian former field hockey player. He competed in the men's tournament at the 1964 Summer Olympics.
