= Victor Warren (field hockey) =

Canadian hockey player

Personal information
- Nationality: Canadian
- Born: 19 August 1937 (age 88) Vancouver, British Columbia, Canada

Sport
- Sport: Field hockey

Victor Warren (born 19 August 1937) is a former Canadian field hockey player.

Born in Vancouver, Victor Warren's father was Harry Warren, who had "spearheaded" the development of field hockey in Canada.

Victor Warren played for the University of British Columbia (UBC) men's field hockey team during the 1950s and early 1960s, and graduated from UBC in 1960. He was later selected for the Canada men's national field hockey team that contested the men's tournament at the 1964 Summer Olympics in Tokyo. He scored once in the tournament, in a pool game against Belgium.

Later acting as president of the Canadian Field Hockey Association, Warren was the manager of the national team during the 1970s and coached the team that represented Canada at the 1976 Summer Olympics in Montreal. He later served as the Canadian national team's vice-president, and was one of the founding members of the VRC Jokers Field Hockey Club.

Warren was inducted into the Field Hockey Canada's "hall of fame" in 2021.
