= Junichi Yamaguchi =

Japanese field hockey player

Personal information
- Nationality: Japanese
- Born: 30 March 1940 (age 86)

Sport
- Sport: Field hockey

Junichi Yamaguchi (born 30 March 1940) is a Japanese field hockey player. He competed in the men's tournament at the 1964 Summer Olympics.

Junichi was a key official of the Nagano Olympic bid committee, which spent approximately $14 million to entertain the 62 International Olympic Committee (IOC) members and many of their companions. The precise figures are unknown since Nagano, after the IOC asked that the entertainment expenditures not be made public, destroyed the financial records.
