= Amar Singh Billing =

Indian cyclist

Personal information
- Born: 10 January 1944 (age 82) Patiala, Punjab

Cycling career
- Sport: Cycling

Amar Singh Billing (born 10 January 1944) is an Indian former cyclist. He competed in three events at the 1964 Summer Olympics.
