= Prithipal Singh =

Indian field hockey player

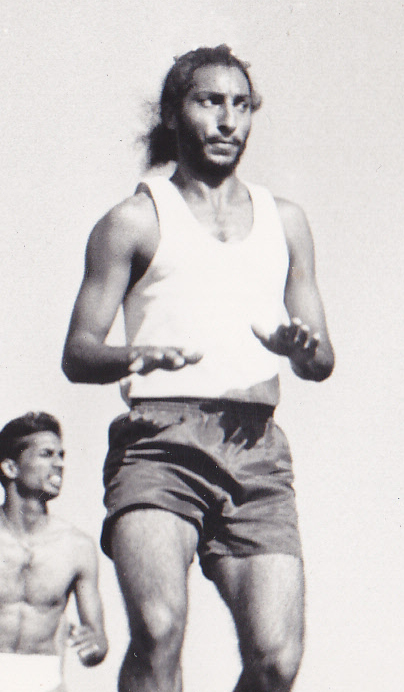
- Singh at the 1960 Summer Olympics

Personal information
- Born: 28 January 1932 Nankana Sahib, British India
- Died: 20 May 1983 (aged 51) Ludhiana, Punjab, India
- Height: 1.75 m (5 ft 9 in)
- Weight: 71 kg (157 lb)

Sport
- Sport: Field hockey
- Position: Halfback
Senior career
| Years | Team | Caps | Goals |
| – | Punjab Police | - | - |
National team
| Years | Team | Caps | Goals |
| – | India | | - |
Medal record
Representing India
Olympic Games
| Silver medal – second place | 1960 Rome | Team |
| Gold medal – first place | 1964 Tokyo | Team |
| Bronze medal – third place | 1968 Mexico | Team |
Asian Games
| Silver medal – second place | 1962 Jakarta | Team |
| Gold medal – first place | 1966 Bangkok | Team |

Prithipal Singh (28 January 1932 – 20 May 1983) was an Indian field hockey player who played as a halfback. He was a member of the India national team that won a gold medal at the 1964 Tokyo Olympics, and silver and bronze at the 1960 Rome Olympics and bronze at the 1968 Mexico Olympics respectively.

Singh was nicknamed the 'King of short corner' by hockey commentators. He was known for sharp reflexes, tremendous strength in his long and powerful arms produced firm and sticking shots which unfailingly fetched him goals and often the winners. The Evening Post (New Zealand) commented in 1961 that to face the fury of Prithipal's hit is to risk one's life. Another author commented that if Arjuna was the maharathi (great warrior) of the Mahabharata War, Prithipal was the maharathi of the International Hockey game. The first-ever Arjuna Award to a hockey player was conferred upon him in 1961, which was later followed by the Padma Shri in 1967.

== Early life and education ==
Singh was born on 28 January 1932 in the city of Nankana Sahib, British India (now in Pakistan). His father Sardar Wadhawa Singh Chandi was a school teacher and an agriculturist. Prithipal spent his childhood in Nankana Sahib and took his early education there. After the partition of India, the family moved to East Punjab and Prithipal obtained his Master of Science degree in agriculture in 1956 from Agriculture College, Ludhiana. He was to teach there later when the college amalgamated into the newly created Punjab Agricultural University. Singh excelled in his studies and won merit scholarships for academic excellence. From 1950 to 1956, he represented the Agricultural College Ludhiana hockey team and was awarded "roll of honors" for his all-round achievements in sports and education.

== Hockey career ==
Between 1950 and 1954, Singh represented his college hockey team four times and was appointed the captain of the team in 1955. He participated in the various national hockey tournaments from Punjab. Upon completion of his post-graduation in 1956, Singh joined Punjab Police as an inspector and started playing for their team. In 1958, he played in Uganda, Kenya, Tanzania and Zanzibar as part of the India national field hockey team. In 1959, he participated in the Munich festival held in Germany where he was judged the best fullback player in the world. That same year he toured all the European countries.

During the Rome Olympics held in Rome in 1960, Singh carried out two hat-tricks in the matches against Denmark and the Netherlands. He remained the top scorer in the Olympics and was also judged the best full-back player. In the international hockey tournaments played in Ahmdabad in India, in the final match with Germany, Singh scored the clinching goals and thus defeated West Germany. He represented Indian Wanderers Hockey in 1961 that toured New Zealand and Australia and participated in the 1962 Asian Games held in Indonesia. He resigned from Punjab Police in 1963 and joined the Indian Railways Police and started playing for their team. Within two years, he was awarded the Railway Minister's Medal for being the "Best Railway Sportsman".

Politics dictated the IHF selection committee which excluded Singh from the Indian field hockey team in 1963. There was a loud uproar in the Indian press which protested in unison: "Has Prithipal become so bad [unwanted player] after resigning from the Punjab Police?”. The Indian Railway Police, however, began winning national tournaments.

While playing for Indian Railways, Singh won a vital link under the leadership of Charanjit Singh. He was included in the Indian field hockey team headed for the Tokyo Olympics in 1964, which regained the Olympic title at Tokyo after defeating their arch-rival Pakistani team. Commenting on the performance of Indian team at Tokyo, Melville de Mellow wrote: "All played brilliant hockey, but as always some were superb: Prithipal Singh, who scored 11 of India's 22 goals in the tournament will be remembered particularly for he was like the Rock of Gibraltar".

Singh participated at the 1966 Asian Games held in Bangkok as a team member of the Shankar Laxman squad. This squad won the gold medal at the tournament. In 1967, Singh skippered India against the visiting German and Dutch teams. In the same year Singh captained the Indian team to Madrid, Spain and won the tournament and the gold medal for India. In 1968, Singh was selected as the captain with Gurbakash Singh as the joint captain for the 1968 Olympics held in Mexico. At that tournament, India won the bronze medal, although Prithipal Singh again remained the top scorer in the Olympics.

=== Tokyo Olympics ===
In the first half of the final match between India and Pakistan at the Tokyo Olympics, the scoreline was 0-0. In the 6th minute, of the second half, the thunderous penalty shot of Prithipal Singh was taken on foot by the Pakistani defender. Mohinder Pal scored from the resultant penalty stroke and India took the lead. In later half, the Pakistani team started resorting to a rough game and show of force to scare the Indian players in order to win the match. Around the middle of second half, there was a free wielding of hockey sticks. One Japanese newspaper published a picture on its front page showing one Pakistani player swinging his stick towards his Indian opponent. In the same picture, Singh was shown as holding one Pakistani player by the throat and striking his stick into his ankle with right hand. One Pakistani forward nicknamed 'Bola', who was notorious for his rough game and greatly feared by the European players, feared Singh and ceased approaching him. Pakistani player Munir Dar shouted at 'Bola' urging him to be aggressive and neutralize the Indian goal, but 'Bola' is reported to have shot back at Munir Dar: "Can’t do it now man, your dad Prithipal is pitched ahead!". Thus, India defeated its rival and won the gold medal. Of India's total 22 goals scored in the Tokyo Olympics, Singh scored 11.

== Awards and recognition ==
From 1950 to 1956, Singh represented Agricultural College Ludhiana Hockey team and was awarded the "roll of honors” for his all-round achievements in sports and education in 1955. The Indian Government acknowledged his prominence in the field of Hockey and the first-ever Arjuna Award to a hockey player was conferred to him in 1961 by the Indian President, Rajendra Prasad. Sports writers for various newspapers and sports magazines described him as the all-time best full-back hockey player.

In 1963, Singh resigned from Punjab Police and joined the Indian Railways Police. Indian Railway Police acknowledged his talent and performance in hockey field. Singh was awarded the Railway Minister's Medal in 1965 for being the "Best Railway Sportsman". He was awarded the Padma Shri in 1967 by the Indian President Zakir Husain for his meritorious contributions to world hockey.

== Other achievements ==
Singh retired from active hockey after the 1968 Mexico Olympics. For some time he was made chairman of IHF selection committee. In 1974, he was as an observer with the Indian hockey team to Malaysia to participate in the Men's Hockey World Cup. The Indian team won the World Cup for India. Singh also was member of the National Institute of Sports, Patiala and also member of the governing body of Lakshmibai College of Physical Education, Gwalior. He was appointed the Director of Sports at the Punjab Agricultural University (PAU), Ludhiana as well as the Director of Student Welfare in 1968. He had actively participated in all activities relating to Student Welfare until his death in 1983. He was also the Director of Sports, PAU. Many believe that Singh coached the secrets of an iron grip and was the inspiration behind four times World Armwrestling champion and two times World Martial Arts Breaking champion Jay Ranade, when he worked for Singh at the Punjab Agricultural University in weight lifting coaching.

== Death ==
Singh was shot dead by students in the campus of the Punjab Agricultural University on 20 May 1983 in Ludhiana. Others claim that he was shot by political rivals or by a deep conspiracy of hockey competitors as his murder remains unsolved. It is also deeply alleged that as the director of sports and student's welfare at Punjab Agricultural University, Singh was involved in the murder of footballer Piara Singh Parmar.

== In popular culture ==
Prithipal Singh (2015) is an Indian docudrama film about his life and achievements by Babita Puri. The movie is available on YouTube.

== See also ==
- List of unsolved murders (1980–1999)
