= Amar Singh Sokhi =

Indian cyclist

Personal information
- Born: 2 July 1935 (age 91)

Cycling career
- Sport: Cycling

Amar Singh Sokhi (born 2 July 1935) is an Indian former cyclist. He competed in three events at the 1964 Summer Olympics.
