= Edgar Fernandes =

Kenyan field hockey player (born 1938)

Personal information
- Full name: Edgar Simon Cyril Fernandes
- Nationality: Kenyan
- Born: 12 April 1938 (age 88) Kisumu, British Kenya

Sport
- Sport: Field hockey

Edgar Fernandes (born 12 April 1938) is a Kenyan field hockey player. He competed at the 1960 and the 1964 Summer Olympics. He is the brother of Kenyan hockey international Egbert Fernandes.
