= Egbert Fernandes =

Kenyan field hockey player (1941–2014)

Personal information
- Nationality: Kenyan
- Born: 25 June 1941 Kisumu, British Kenya
- Died: 6 November 2014 (aged 73) Canberra, Australia

Sport
- Sport: Field hockey
- Club: Goan Institute

Egbert Fernandes (25 June 1941 – 6 November 2014) was a Kenyan field hockey player. He competed at the 1960 Summer Olympics, the 1964 and the 1968 Summer Olympics. He is the brother of Kenyan hockey international, Edgar Fernandes.
