= Peter Byers (field hockey) =

New Zealand field hockey player

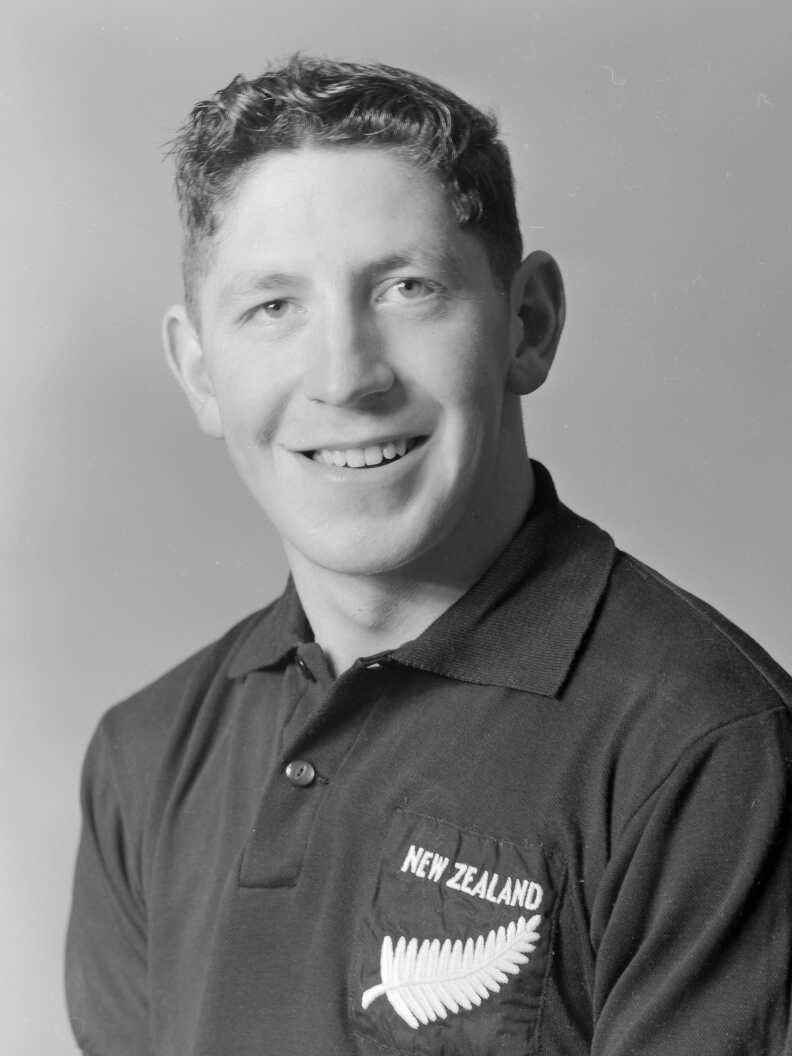
- Byers in 1964

Personal information
- Born: 14 February 1944 (age 82) Whangārei, New Zealand
- Height: 183 cm (6 ft 0 in)
- Weight: 87 kg (13 st 10 lb)

Sport
- Sport: Field hockey

Peter William Byers (born 14 February 1944) is a retired New Zealand field hockey player. He played five matches at the 1964 Summer Olympics and scored one goal.
