= Theo van Vroonhoven =

Dutch hockey player

Personal information
- Nationality: Dutch
- Born: 15 May 1940 (age 86) Venlo, Netherlands

Sport
- Sport: Field hockey

Theo van Vroonhoven (born 15 May 1940) is a Dutch field hockey player. He competed at the 1960 Summer Olympics, the 1964 Summer Olympics and the 1968 Summer Olympics.
