= Jorge Vidal (field hockey) =

Spanish field hockey player (born 1943)

Personal information
- Nationality: Spanish
- Born: 9 November 1943 (age 82) Barcelona, Spain

Sport
- Sport: Field hockey

Jorge Vidal (born 9 November 1943) is a Spanish field hockey player. He competed at the 1964 Summer Olympics and the 1968 Summer Olympics.
