= Patrick Nilan =

Australian field hockey player (1941–2024)

Olympic medal record

Men's field hockey

Representing Australia
Silver medal – second place	1968 Mexico City	Team competition
Bronze medal – third place	1964 Tokyo	Team competition

Patrick Joseph Nilan OAM (30 June 1941 – 10 May 2024) was an Australian field hockey player who competed in the 1964 Summer Olympics, in the 1968 Summer Olympics, and in the 1972 Summer Olympics. Born in Sydney on 30 June 1941, Nilan died on 10 May 2024, at the age of 82.
