= Frans Fiolet =

Dutch field hockey player (1939–2024)

Personal information
- Born: July 20, 1939 The Hague, Netherlands
- Died: December 14, 2024 (aged 85) Arnhem, Netherlands
- Height: 1.82 m (6 ft 0 in)
- Weight: 80 kg (180 lb)

Sport
- Sport: Field hockey
- Club: HDM, Den Haag

Franciscus Antonius "Frans" Fiolet (20 July 1939 – December 14, 2024) was a Dutch field hockey player from the Netherlands. He competed at the 1960 and 1964 Summer Olympics, where his team finished in ninth and seventh place, respectively.

Fiolet died on December 14, 2024, at the age of 85.
