= Alan Patterson (field hockey) =

New Zealand field hockey player

Alan Joseph Patterson (born 19 January 1941) is a former field hockey player from New Zealand, who represented his native country at three Summer Olympics: in 1960, 1964 and 1972.
