= Francis van 't Hooft =

Dutch field hockey player (born 1940)

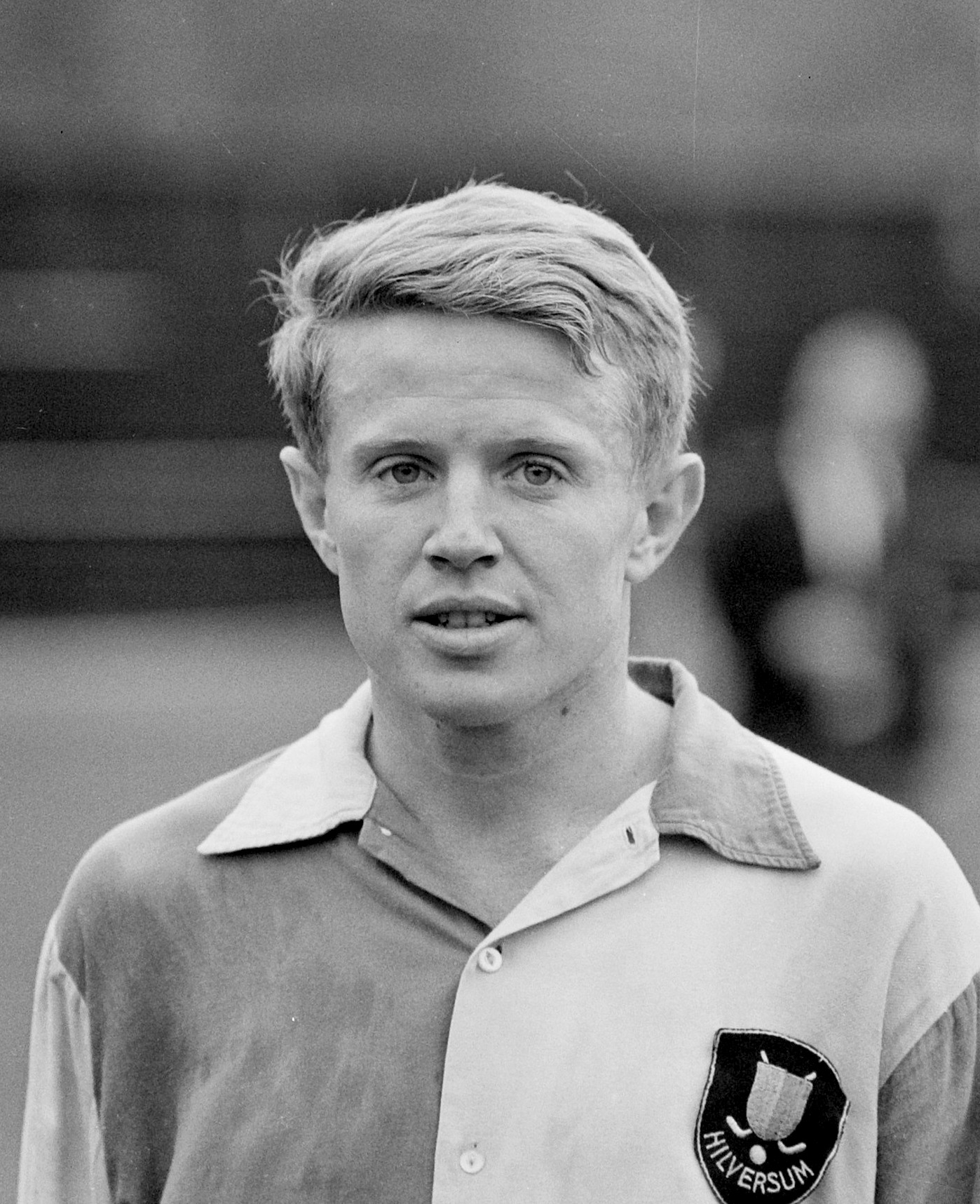
- Francis van 't Hooft in 1963

Personal information
- Born: 3 January 1940 (age 86) Semarang, Indonesia
- Height: 1.70 m (5 ft 7 in)
- Weight: 63 kg (139 lb)

Sport
- Sport: Field hockey
- Club: HMHC, Hilversum

Jan Francis van 't Hooft (born 3 January 1940) is a retired field hockey player from the Netherlands. He competed at the 1964 Summer Olympics where his team finished in seventh place. He played six matches and scored two goals.
