= Alu Mendonca =

Indian-born Kenyan field hockey player

Personal information
- Full name: Aloysius Eduardo Mendonca
- Nickname: Alexinho
- Nationality: Kenyan
- Born: 5 January 1933 Anjuna, Goa, Portuguese India
- Died: 10 March 2017 (aged 84) Nairobi, Kenya
- Height: 175 cm (5 ft 9 in)
- Weight: 60 kg (132 lb)

Sport
- Country: Kenya
- Sport: Field hockey
- Club: Railway Goan Institute, Nairobi

Aloysius "Älu" Eduardo Mendonca (5 January 1933 – 10 March 2017) was a Kenyan field hockey player, born in Portuguese India. He competed at the 1956, 1960, 1964 and the 1968 Summer Olympics.
