= Syed Ali (field hockey, born 1942) =

Indian field hockey player

Medal record

Men's field hockey

Representing India

Olympic Games
Gold medal – first place	1964 Tokyo	Team competition

Syed Mushtaq Ali (10 July 1942 – 2 March 2010) (Note: His name is also given as Syed Mushtaque Ali or Ali Sayeed and his birth date has also been listed as 15 April 1938.) was a field hockey player from India who won a gold medal with the Men's National Team at the 1964 Summer Olympics in Tokyo.
