= Haripal Kaushik =

Indian field hockey player (1934–2018)

Haripal Kaushik VrC
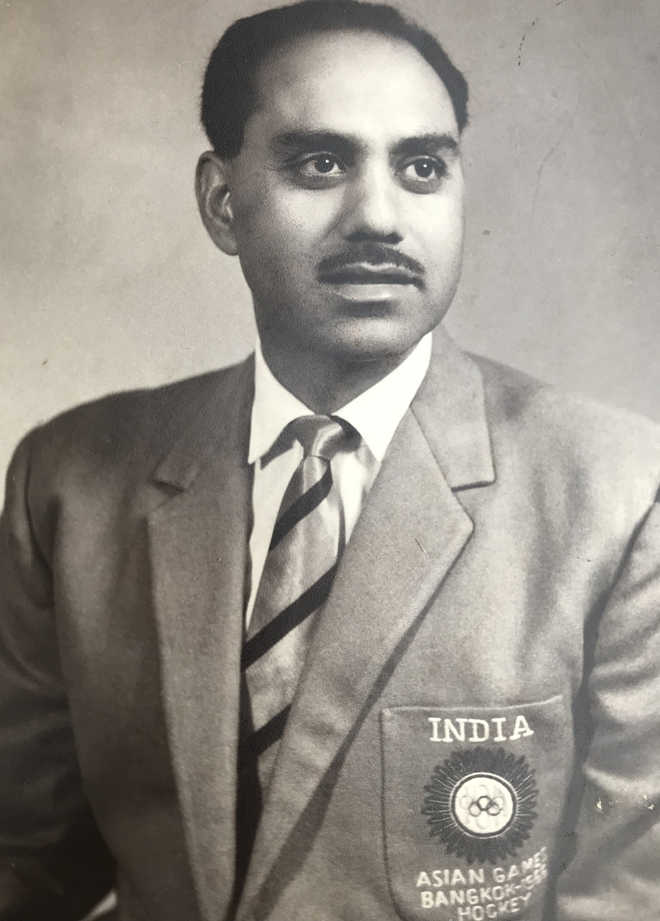
- Born: Haripal Kaushik; 2 February 1934; Jalandhar, British India
- Died: 25 January 2018 (aged 83); Jalandhar, India
- Military career
- Allegiance: India
- Branch: Indian Army
- Rank: Lieutenant Colonel
- Nickname: Crisis Man
- Unit: Sikh Regiment
- Awards: Vir Chakra
- Sports career
- Height: 5 ft 10 in (178 cm)
- Sport: Field hockey
- Position: Inside-Right
Medal record
Men's Field Hockey
Representing India
Olympic Games
Men's field hockey
Gold medal – first place	1956 Melbourne	Team competition
Gold medal – first place	1964 Tokyo	Team competition
Asian Games
Gold medal – first place	1966 Asian Games	Team competition

Haripal Kaushik, VrC (2 February 1934 – 25 January 2018) was an Indian field hockey player, military officer and television commentator.

== Field hockey ==
He won gold medals in the 1956 Summer Olympics and the 1964 Summer Olympics. He was vice captain of the team that won the gold medal in the 1966 Asian Games, and was later a field hockey administrator and television commentator. He received the Arjuna Award for excellence in athletic competition in 1998.

== Military service ==
Commissioned into the Indian Army in 1959, Kaushik served in the 1st Battalion of the Sikh Regiment.

In the early days of the 1962 Sino-Indian War, Kaushik was commanding the forward company at the Battle of Bumla along the border between India and China when the Chinese People's Liberation Army invaded on 23 October. During heavy combat with much larger enemy forces, he led a successful retreat, saving the unit's heavy machine guns and mortars.

Kaushik was awarded the Vir Chakra for "exemplary courage and self-disregard" on the battlefield. He rose to the rank of lieutenant-colonel. He was injured in an ambush attack by a Chinese column in Nyukmadong on 18 November 1962.

Haripal Stadium at the Indian Army's Mechanised Infantry Regimental Centre in Ahmednagar is named in his honor.

== Vir Chakra ==
The citation for the Vir Chakra awarded to him reads:

CITATION
(LIEUTENANT HARI PAL KAUSHAK)

Lieutenant Hari Pal Kaushak was commanding a Company holding the Tongpengla position in N.E.F.A. At 05.30hrs on 23rd October 1962 the Chinese started attacking with a Regiment on the Bumla axis with the intention of breaking through to Towang. His company's position was first attacked by a Chinese Battalion, but the attack was repulsed, with heavy losses, by his forward platoon. After the fall of the forward platoon, a second Battalion of the enemy attacked on a wide front trying to overrun the Company's position. Lieutenant Kaushak moved from one section position to another under enemy fire encouraging his troops. He was a source of inspiration to his men who continued to fight with great determination under his leadership. Eventually when under heavy enemy pressure he was ordered to withdraw. he handled the withdrawal skilfully and managed to clear, in the face of enemy fire, all his personnel and weapons including heavy mortars and medium machine guns.

== Family and later years ==
He was married to Prem Bala Kaushik, who died before him in 1983. They had one daughter, Veronica. Kaushik took early retirement from his military service and worked for a sugar mill in Phagwara as a general manager. He also created Goal Getter which was his own brand of hockey sticks. He died at his home in the Jalandhar cantonment, after suffering from dementia for several years. A book titled Camouflage: Forgotten Stories from Battlefields written by Probal DasGupta was released in November 2023 which features a chapter on the life of Kaushik, namely Rise after the Fall of 1962: The Amazing Comeback of Haripal Kaushik.
