= Jan van Gooswilligen =

Dutch field hockey player (1935–2008)

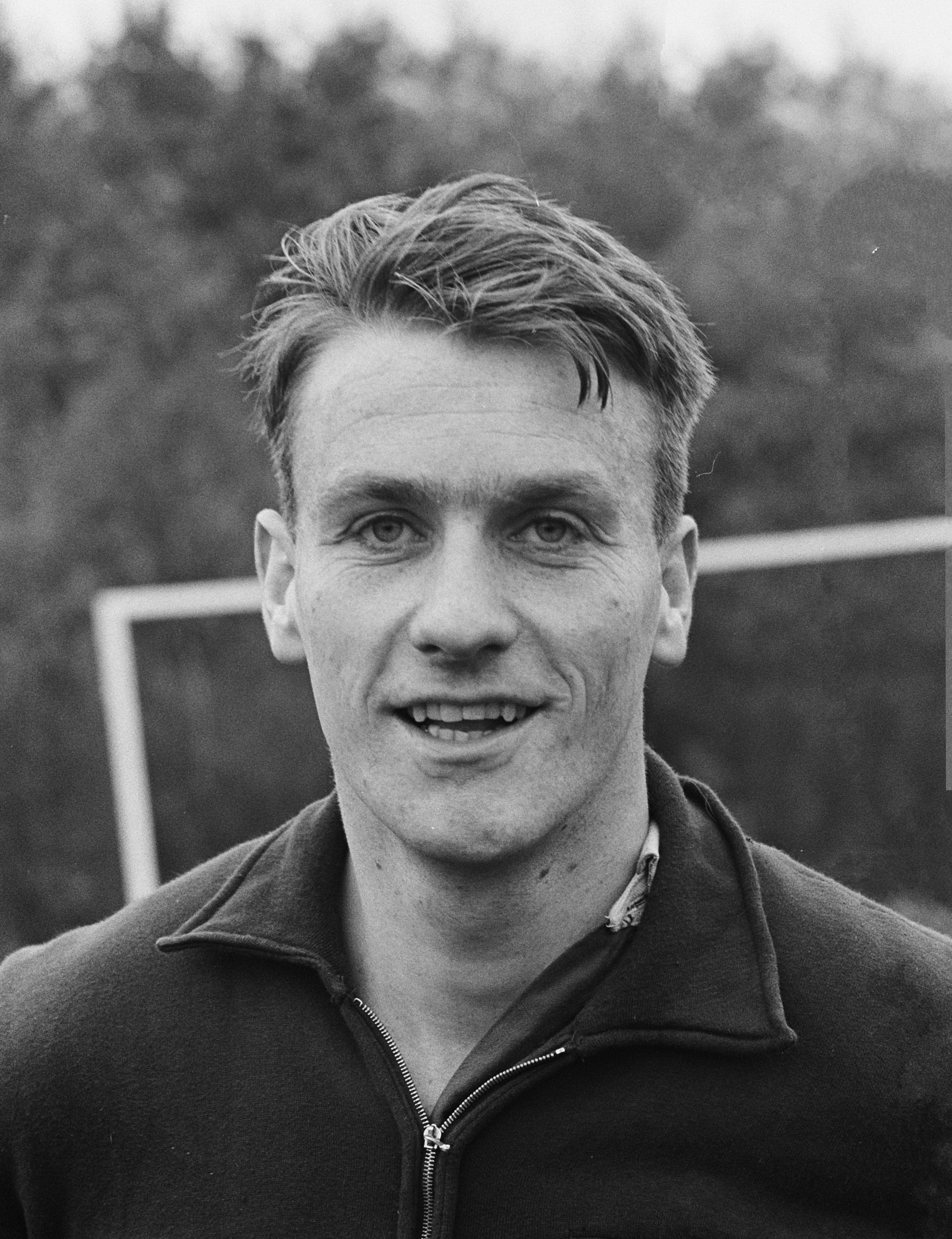
- Jan van Gooswilligen in 1963

Personal information
- Born: 12 July 1935 Baarn, the Netherlands
- Died: 19 December 2008 (aged 73) De Wijk, Drenthe, Netherlands
- Height: 1.89 m (6 ft 2 in)
- Weight: 83 kg (183 lb)

Sport
- Sport: Field hockey
- Club: SCHC, Bilthoven

Jan Cornelis van Gooswilligen (12 July 1935 – 19 December 2008) was a Dutch hockey player.

== International career ==
He competed at the 1960 and 1964 Summer Olympics, where his team finished in ninth and seventh place, respectively. Between 1958 and 1964 he played 58 international matches, 38 of them as the team captain.

Van Gooswilligen was selected for the national team in 1958. Next year, he and three other players left the team in protest of unfair selection processes; as a result a new group of selectors was appointed. The same year he won a national title with his club SCHC.

== Retirement and Philanthropy ==
After retiring from hockey, van Gooswilligen became a urologist and occasionally competed in cycling at the national level.

Together with his wife Ammy, he founded an advisory center for sports medicine.
