= Yves Bernaert =

Belgian field hockey player (born 1937)

Personal information
- Nationality: Belgian
- Born: 27 March 1937 (age 89) Ghent, Belgium

Sport
- Sport: Field hockey

Yves Bernaert (born 27 March 1937) is a Belgian field hockey player. He competed at the 1960 Summer Olympics, the 1964 Summer Olympics and the 1968 Summer Olympics.
