= Zafar Hayat =

Pakistani field hockey player

Personal information
- Nationality: Pakistani
- Born: 31 March 1927

Sport
- Sport: Field hockey
Medal record
Men's field hockey
Representing Pakistan
Olympic Games
Silver medal – second place	1964 Tokyo	Team competition

Zafar Hayat (born 31 March 1927) is a Pakistani field hockey player. He competed in the men's tournament at the 1964 Summer Olympics, and was part of the team that won the silver medal.
