= Tsuneya Yuzaki =

Japanese field hockey player

Personal information
- Nationality: Japanese
- Born: 10 February 1941 (age 85) Hokkaido, Japan

Sport
- Sport: Field hockey
Medal record
Representing Japan
Asian Games
Bronze medal – third place	1966 Bangkok	Team

Tsuneya Yuzaki (born 10 February 1941) is a Japanese field hockey player. He competed at the 1960 Summer Olympics, the 1964 Summer Olympics and the 1968 Summer Olympics.
