= Rajaratnam Yogeswaran =

Malaysian field hockey player (born 1940)

Personal information
- Nationality: Malaysian
- Born: 28 February 1940 (age 86)

Sport
- Sport: Field hockey
Medal record
Men's field hockey
Representing Malaya
Asian Games
Bronze medal – third place	1962 Jakarta	Team

Rajaratnam Yogeswaran (born 28 February 1940) is a Malaysian former field hockey player. He competed at the 1964 Summer Olympics and the 1968 Summer Olympics.
