= Manzoor Hussain Atif =

Pakistani field hockey player

Personal information
- Born: 4 September 1928 Gujrat, Punjab, British India
- Died: 8 December 2008 (aged 80) Rawalpindi, Pakistan
- Resting place: H-11 Graveyard, Islamabad, Pakistan
- Home town: Wazirabad
- Education: Mission High School, Wazirabad; Zamindar College, Gujrat
- Parents: Sheikh Nazir Hussain (father); Sughra Begum (mother)
- Relative: Sheikh Maqbool Ellahi (first cousin)
Medal record
Men's field hockey
Representing Pakistan
Olympic Games
Gold medal – first place	1960 Rome	Team competition
Silver medal – second place	1956 Melbourne	Team competition
Silver medal – second place	1964 Tokyo	Team competition
Asian Games
Gold medal – first place	1962 Jakarta	Team competition

Brigadier (R) Manzoor Hussain Atif (4 September 1928 – 8 December 2008) was a secretary of Pakistan Hockey Federation and an Olympian in the game of field hockey. In 1994, he was a recipient of the Silver Olympic Order.

== Early life and career ==
Atif started as a soldier in the Pakistan Armed Forces and eventually reached the rank of a Brigadier. Later while Atif was involved with the Pakistan national hockey team, the team won one Olympic gold medal in 1960 and two Olympic silver medals in 1956 and 1964. He is regarded as one of the most successful Olympians of Pakistan.

- Atif was the Secretary of Pakistan Hockey Federation for 11 years
- Atif was the Secretary of Asian Hockey Federation for 16 years
- Atif was the Vice President of Asian Hockey Federation from 1982 to 2001

== Awards and recognition ==
- Pride of Performance Award for Sports in 1963 by the President of Pakistan
- Lifetime Achievement Award by the Asian Hockey Federation

== Death and legacy ==
Atif died on 8 December 2008 in Combined Military Hospital Rawalpindi, Pakistan at age 80. He was a passionate person as a field hockey player as well as a Pakistan hockey team manager. Pakistan won its second Olympic gold medal at Mexico City in 1968 and then at Los Angeles in 1984 when he was the team manager. He was a highly respected person in the world of field hockey. Qasim Zia and Asif Bajwa of the Pakistan Hockey Federation paid rich tributes to Atif at a memorial event held at Lahore, after his death. Qasim Zia called him "not only a pure administrator but also a very polite and humble person."
