= Bruce Judge =

New Zealand hockey player

Personal information
- Nationality: New Zealand
- Born: 3 April 1942 (age 84) Timaru, New Zealand

Sport
- Sport: Field hockey

Bruce Raymond Judge (born 3 April 1942) is a New Zealand field hockey player and businessman. He competed at the 1964 Summer Olympics and the 1968 Summer Olympics.

In 1986, the New Zealand Rich List estimated Judge's personal fortune to be at least $250 million. This made him, at the time, the fifth richest New Zealander.

His companies, Judge Corp and Ariadne, were 'iconic symbols of the 1987 sharemarket boom and crash'. When Judge Corp collapsed, it had debts around $350m. Although Bruce Judge was investigated, he was never officially charged with any offence.
