= Munir Dar (field hockey) =

Pakistani field hockey player

Personal information
- Full name: Munir Ahmed Dar
- Born: 28 March 1935 Amritsar, British India
- Died: 1 June 2011 (aged 76) Lahore, Pakistan

Sport
- Sport: Field hockey
- Position: Fullback
National team
Years	Team	Caps	Goals
1956–1967	Pakistan	92	(41)
Medal record
Men's field hockey
Representing Pakistan
Olympic Games
Gold medal – first place	1960 Rome	Team competition
Silver medal – second place	1956 Melbourne	Team competition
Silver medal – second place	1964 Tokyo	Team competition
Asian Games
Gold medal – first place	1958 Tokyo	Team competition
Gold medal – first place	1962 Jakarta	Team competition
Silver medal – second place	1966 Bangkok	Team competition

Munir Ahmed Dar (28 March 1935 – 1 June 2011) was a Pakistani field hockey player who played as a fullback. He was a member of the Pakistan team that won gold at the 1960 Rome Olympics and silver at the 1956 Melbourne and 1964 Tokyo Olympics. He captained the side from 1965 to 1967.

== Early life ==
Dar was born on 28 March 1935 in Amritsar into a Kashmiri Muslim family, then a part of British India. His family moved to Pakistan after the partition of India in 1947, where he discovered his love for hockey and was a member of his school team. He was also a member of the hockey team of the Government College, Lahore, while he was a student there.

== Career ==
Dar made his debut for the Pakistan national team in 1954. He was picked in the team for the 1956 Melbourne Olympics, where Pakistan won the silver in the event, the country's first ever medal in the Olympic Games. At the 1958 Asian Games, Dar broke the world record for most goals scored by a fullback in a match, when he scored five against South Korea (then Korea), all coming off penalty corners. Pakistan went on to win the game 8–0. Pakistan went on to win gold at the Games; Dar scored a total of eight goals in the competition. Two years later, Dar figured in Pakistan's gold-winning campaign at the 1960 Rome Olympics, that ended India's 32-year hegemony at Olympic hockey. He finished with four goals in the 1962 Asian Games, where his team again defeated India to claim the gold medal in the final. Dar's third Olympic medal came at the 1964 Tokyo Olympics, when the team won silver.

Dar remained Pakistan's first choice as a fullback until his retirement in 1967. Dar also captained the national side from 1965 to 1967, leading the team to a silver at the 1966 Asian Games. In 1977, Dar recalled the 1956 Melbourne Olympics silver medal win as the "most memorable moment" of his playing career. He scored a total of 41 goals from 92 appearances for Pakistan.

== Later life ==
Before retirement, Dar groomed his brother Tanvir who also played as a fullback for the Pakistan team between 1965 and 1974. He was a member of the gold-winning team at the 1968 Mexico City Olympics and the 1971 World Cup, the latter of which he was the top-scorer of. Munir had three sons: the eldest, Tauqeer, won gold at the 1984 Los Angeles Olympics; Taseer was stand-by for the team in that Games squad but never got to play for the Pakistan team; and the youngest, Tafseer, was a first-class cricketer. Dar went on to coach the Pakistan's senior and junior national sides in the 1970s and 1980s. The Dar brothers established a hockey academy in Pakistan after their playing days.

Outside hockey, Dar had an eye for horses and owned several Thoroughbreds, which won many races at the Lahore Race Club. He was the founding president of the Pakistan Karate Federation and also served in the executive committee of the Pakistan Rugby Union. A police officer by profession, Dar served as chairman of the Police Sports Board from 1985 to 1995. During his tenure, the policemen won laurels at the national, Asian and world levels. Dar was also instrumental in raising the Asian-style kabaddi team of the police; some went on to become part of the Pakistan national kabaddi team. Dar suffered from lung cancer and died on 1 June 2011. He was buried in the Defence Graveyard, Lahore.

== Awards and recognition ==
- He was inducted into the Hockey Hall Of Fame of Pakistan Olympic Association
- Tamgha-i-Imtiaz (Medal of Excellence) Award by the President of Pakistan in 2015
