= André Muschs =

Belgian field hockey player

Personal information
- Nationality: Belgian
- Born: 10 August 1934 (age 92) Ixelles, Belgium

Sport
- Sport: Field hockey

André Muschs (born 10 August 1934) is a Belgian field hockey player. He competed at the 1956, 1960, 1964 and the 1968 Summer Olympics.
