= José Colomer =

Spanish field hockey player (1935–2013)

Olympic medal record

Men's Field Hockey
Bronze medal – third place	1960 Rome	Team competition

José Colomer Rivas (June 10, 1935 – January 24, 2013) was a field hockey player from Spain who won the bronze medal with the Men's National Team at the 1960 Summer Olympics in Rome, Italy.
