= Theo Terlingen =

Dutch field hockey player

Personal information
- Born: 26 May 1939 Bussum, the Netherlands
- Died: 1 May 2006 (aged 66) Venlo, the Netherlands
- Height: 1.78 m (5 ft 10 in)
- Weight: 75 kg (165 lb)

Sport
- Sport: Field hockey
- Club: AH&BC, Amsterdam

Theodorus Bernardus Maria "Theo" Terlingen (26 May 1939 – 1 May 2006) was a field hockey player from the Netherlands. He competed at the 1960, 1964 and 1968 Summer Olympics where his team finished in ninth, seventh and fifth place, respectively. A defense player, he scored two goals in 1964 and one in 1968.
