= Darshan Singh (field hockey) =

Indian field hockey player

Medal record

Representing India

Men's Field hockey

Olympic Games
Gold medal – first place	1964 Tokyo	Team

Asian Games
Silver medal – second place	1962 Jakarta	Team

Darshan Singh Kullar (born 15 April 1938 in Sansarpur, Punjab) is a former Indian field hockey player who now lives in Telford, Shropshire, United Kingdom. In 1961, he played for India in the international hockey tournament at Ahmedabad and scored 22 goals. In the semi-final, he scored a double hat-trick against Holland. He was part of the Indian Hockey team that won the gold medal in the 1964 Summer Olympics at Tokyo, Japan. He was then serving in the Punjab Police. He emigrated to the UK from India in the late 1960s. In November 2025 he and his wife celebrated their 70th wedding anniversary.
