= Kuldip Gosal =

Field hockey player

Personal information
- Full name: Kuldip Singh Gosal
- Nationality: Hong Kong-Canadian
- Born: 23 June 1946 (age 79) Jalandhar, Punjab, British India

Sport
- Sport: Field hockey
- Club: Nav Bharat Club, Hong Kong; Hull-Ottawa Club, Canada

Kuldip Singh Gosal (born 23 June 1946) is an Indian-born Hong Kong and later Canadian former field hockey player who competed in the 1964 Summer Olympics and in the 1976 Summer Olympics. Gosal was a part of the Canada field hockey team which won the silver medal at the 1975 Pan American Games.
