= Alan Raphael =

Canadian field hockey player

Alan Raphael (26 December 1931 – 22 October 2018) was a Canadian field hockey player who competed in the 1964 Summer Olympics.
