= Mohinder Lal (field hockey) =

Indian field hockey player (1936–2004)

Olympic medal record

Men's Field Hockey
Silver medal – second place	1960 Rome	Team competition
Gold medal – first place	1964 Tokyo	Team competition

Asian Games
Gold medal – first place	1966 Bangkok	Team competition

Mohinder Lal (June 1, 1936 – July 1, 2004) was an Indian hockey player.
