= Claude Ravinet =

Belgian field hockey player

Personal information
- Nationality: Belgian
- Born: 24 March 1943 (age 83) Brussels, Belgium

Sport
- Sport: Field hockey

Claude Ravinet (born 24 March 1943) is a Belgian field hockey player. He competed at the 1964 Summer Olympics and the 1968 Summer Olympics.
