= Frank Zweerts =

Dutch field hockey player (born 1943)

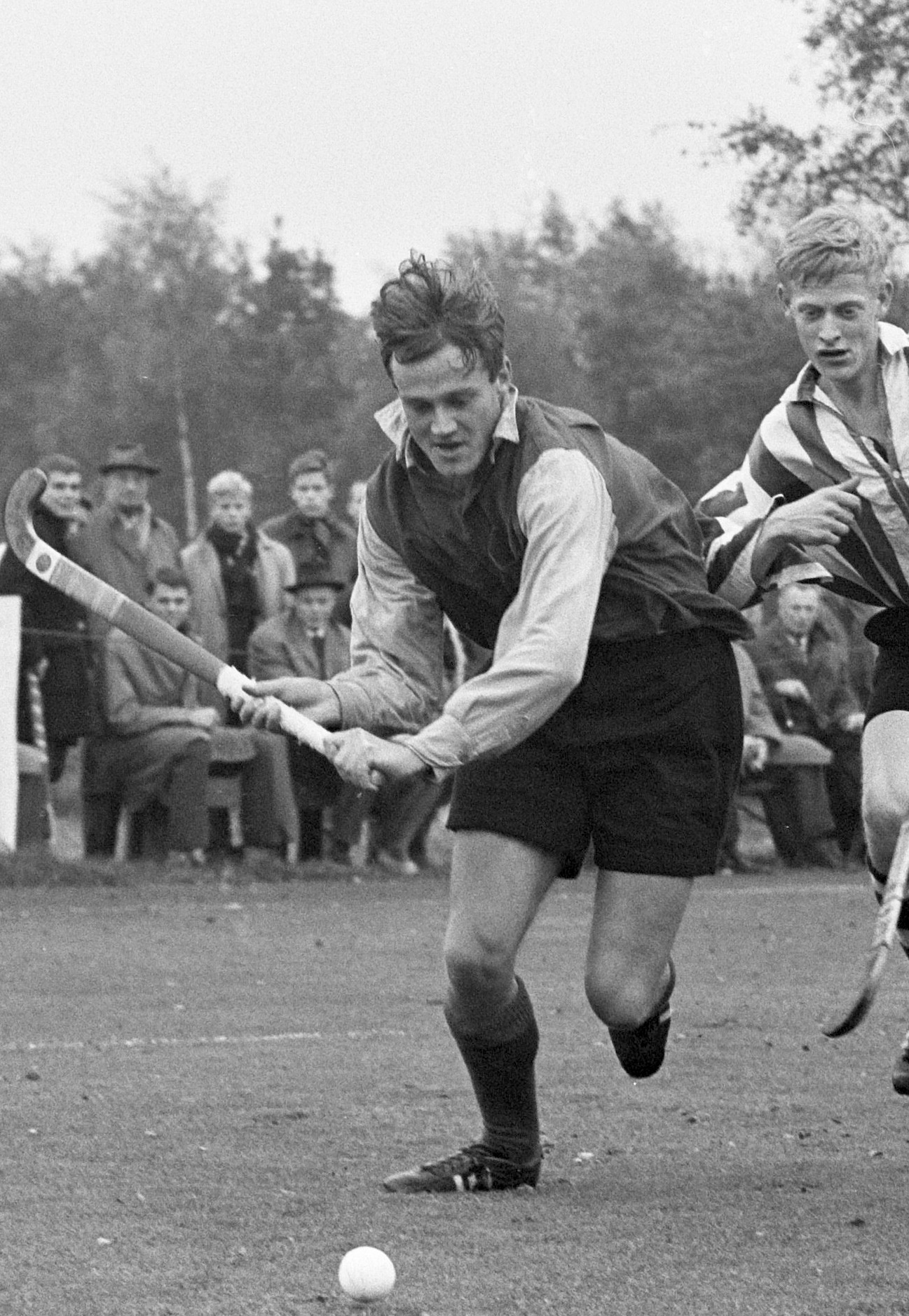
- Frank Zweerts in 1963

Personal information
- Born: 29 June 1943 (age 83) Hilversum, the Netherlands
- Height: 1.86 m (6 ft 1 in)
- Weight: 84 kg (185 lb)

Sport
- Sport: Field hockey
- Club: SCHC, Bilthoven

Guillaum François "Frank" Zweerts (born 29 June 1943) is a retired field hockey player from the Netherlands. He competed at 1964 Summer Olympics, where his team finished in seventh place. With eight goals in six games, Zweerts was the best Dutch player and one of the best overall scorers at those games.

His younger brother Jeroen competed in field hockey at the 1972 Summer Olympics.
