= Robert Ullyett =

Zimbabwean cricketer

Personal information
- Full name: Robert Bassett Ullyett
- Born: 5 April 1936; Salisbury, Southern Rhodesia
- Died: 19 October 2004 (aged 68); Durban, South Africa
- Batting: Right-handed
- Bowling: Right-arm medium
- Role: All-rounder

Domestic team information
- Years: Team
- 1957–1968: Rhodesia

Career statistics
Competition	First-class
Matches	47
Runs scored	2,096
Batting average	26.53
100s/50s	4/6
Top score	135
Balls bowled	3,183
Wickets	46
Bowling average	28.41
5 wickets in innings	3
10 wickets in match	0
Best bowling	7/42
Catches/stumpings	40/–
- Source: CricketArchive, 15 August 2022

Robert Bassett Ullyett (5 April 1936 – 19 October 2004) was a Rhodesian first-class cricketer who played for Rhodesia in the Currie Cup.

The all-rounder was one of six 'South African Cricket Annual Cricketers of the Year' in 1964 on the back of a strong Currie Cup season in which he scored 449 runs at 49.88. It was the first time that he had played as a specialist batsman and he was Rhodesia's leading run-getter that season. Despite having success with the ball in previous years, he didn't add to his 46 first-class wickets from that season until his retirement, only bowling the occasional over. He had twice taken seven wickets in an innings back in 1958, with a best of 7/42 against North Eastern Transvaal at Benoni.

Ullyett represented Rhodesia in field hockey at the 1964 Summer Olympics held in Tokyo and scored a goal in their 4–1 loss to Great Britain. His son Kevin Ullyett is a professional tennis player who won Grand Slam doubles titles at the US and Australian Opens.

In 2000 Ullyett served at the Match Referee in two List A matches at an ICC Emerging Nations Tournament which Zimbabwe hosted.
