= Harbinder Singh =

Indian field hockey player

Medal record

Men's field hockey

Representing India

Olympic Games
Gold medal – first place	1964 Tokyo	Team competition
Bronze medal – third place	1968 Mexico	Team competition
Bronze medal – third place	1972 Munich	Team competition

Asian Games
Gold medal – first place	1966 Bangkok	Team competition
Silver medal – second place	1970 Bangkok	Team competition

Harbinder Singh (born 8 July 1943 in Quetta) is a former field hockey player from India. He started his international career in 1961 at the age of 18 years [youngest member of the team] with a tour to New Zealand and Australia with Indian hockey team. During the span of 12 years from 1961 to 1972 had represented the country in three Olympics – Tokyo 1964 — gold medal (scored highest field goals – 5 out of 9 goals), Mexico 1968 — bronze medal (scored highest field goals – 6 out of 11, including hat-trick against Mexico) and was also selected as a centre forward in the "World XI", in Munich 1972 — bronze medal.

== Career ==
He represented the country in three Asian Games at Bangkok 1966—won gold medal, again at Bangkok 1970 won silver medal and was captain of the team and at Seoul 1986 as chief coach of the Indian Women's hockey team and won the bronze medal.

He also represented India in two international hockey tournaments at Lyon, France, in 1963, and Hamburg, Germany, in 1966, winning the gold medal at both places. At Hamburg, scored 4 goals out of 8 field goals in the tournaments. He represented the country in Pre-Olympic hockey tournament at London in 1967 and won the bronze medal.

Singh represented Punjab state and Indian Railways in the National Hockey Championships from 1961 to 1972 and won 8 Gold and 2 Silver Medals as an active player and as a coach of the Indian Railways Hockey Team from 1975 to 1993 won 8 Gold and 4 Silver Medals.

He represented Punjab in the National Athletic Championship at Trivandrum in 1959 and won the gold medal in the 4x100M Relay Race in juniors. He also represented Indian Railways in the All India Open Athletic Championship at Sangrur [Punjab] in 1967 and won the gold medal in 4x100M Relay Race. It is a very rare feat to win gold medals in two different sports, i.e., hockey and athletics.

== Awards and honours ==
He was conferred with 'Arjuna Award' in 1967, 'Railway Minister Award' in 1966 and 'Best Sportsman Of The Railways' in 1972.

He was member of the Selection Committee of Indian Hockey Federation for juniors [1980-1984 and 1994–1998] and Women Hockey Federation for juniors and seniors [2004–2009]. Presently he is the member of the Selection Committee of 'Hockey India' and was Manager of the Indian Junior Men Hockey Team toured to Kenya [1984].

Being a sprinter he was the fastest centre forward in the 1960s and 1970s. In an interview to the print media Shri. K.D. Singh Babu, chief coach Indian Hockey team in the 1972 Munich Olympics observed that "Harbinder is still the fastest of the Indian Forwards". He was capable of scoring goals by picking up ball from centre line, beating host of defenders with sheer speed, dash and artistry on many occasions. Worth mentioning goals are an equalizer against Pakistan within 20 seconds at Hamburg 1966, stunned each player and spectator and also scored two goals against Holland. Scored two goals against Australia in Pre-Olympics at Lord's [London] in 1967 and was mentioned in print media as "Harbinder's both goals with great dash and surely the bowler hatted monocle occupant of the Long Room at Lord's will talk of him in years to come in same admiring terms as of Graveney and Sobers" and 1 goal in same manner against Germany in the 1968 Mexico Olympics.

He earned the distinction to replace such Olympic centre forwards as Major Dhyan Chand and Balbir Singh senior.

He associated with the game of Hockey for the last 54 years since 1961 serving the Nation for the promotion of Hockey as a Player, Coach, Selector, Organiser and Govt. Observer.

He won 36 Gold, 8 Silver and 4 Bronze Medals in various National and International Competitions during his sports career.

=== Padma Shri ===
In 2024, Harbinder Singh was honored with the Padma Shri, India's fourth-highest civilian award, in recognition of his distinguished contributions in his field.
