= Karl-Heinz Freiberger =

German hockey player

Personal information
- Nationality: German
- Born: 7 March 1941 Meerane, Germany
- Died: 1 June 1992 (aged 51) Mannheim, Germany

Sport
- Sport: Field hockey

Karl-Heinz Freiberger (7 March 1941 – 1 June 1992) was a German field hockey player. Freiberger earned 68 international caps for the East Germany men's national field hockey team from 1961 to 1968. He participated at the 1964 Summer Olympics in Tokyo for the United Team of Germany and the 1968 Summer Olympics in Mexico City for the East Germany men's national field hockey team. Scoring five goals in the 1964 Olympics and three in the 1968 Olympics, he was reportedly named as one of the "best forwards in the world" by the international hockey federation in the 1970s. He was also awarded East Germany's Verdienter Meister des Sports. The Karl-Heinz-Freiberger-Hall (a sports venue) in Meerane, where Freiberger was born, was named in his honour in 1999.
