= Field hockey at the 1964 Summer Olympics =

Tournament details
- Host country: Japan
- City: Tokyo
- Dates: 11–23 October 1964
- Teams: 15 (from 5 confederations)
- Venue: Komazawa Hockey Field

Final positions
- Champions: India (7th title)
- Runner-up: Pakistan
- Third place: Australia

Tournament statistics
- Matches played: 56
- Goals scored: 179 (3.2 per match)
- Top scorer: (India) Prithipal Singh (10 goals)

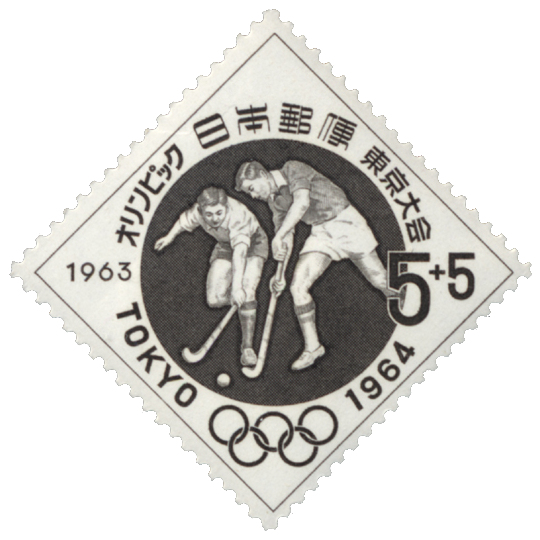

The field hockey tournament at the 1964 Summer Olympics was the 10th edition of the field hockey event for men at the Summer Olympic Games. It was held from 11 to 23 October 1964. All games were played at the Komazawa Hockey Field in Tokyo, Japan.

India defeated Pakistan, the defending champions, by 1–0 in the gold-medal match.

Australia won their first Olympic medal, claiming bronze in a 3–2 win over Spain in extra time.

== Medalists ==
Gold	Silver	Bronze
India; Haripal Kaushik; Mohinder Lal; Shankar Lakshman; Bandu Patil; John Peter; Ali Sayed; Udham Singh Kullar; Charanjit Singh; Darshan Singh; Dharam Singh; Gurbux Singh; Harbinder Singh; Jagjit Singh; Joginder Singh; Prithipal Singh; Balbir Singh Kullar; Rajendran Christie	Pakistan; Abdul Hamid; Muhammad Asad Malik; Munir Dar; Khalid Mahmood; Anwar Ahmed Khan; Khizar Nawaz Bajwa; Azam Khurshid; Muhammad Afzal Manna; Manzoor Hussain Atif; Mohammed Rashid; Motiullah; Tariq Niazi; Saeed Anwar; Aziz Tariq; Hayat Zafar; Uddin Zaka	Australia; Mervyn Crossman; Paul Dearing; Raymond Evans; Brian Glencross; Robin Hodder; John McBryde; Donald McWatters; Patrick Nilan; Eric Pearce; Julian Pearce; Desmond Piper; Donald Smart; Anthony Waters; Graham Wood; Don Martin

== Results ==
=== Preliminary round ===
==== Pool A ====
Pos	Team	Pld	W	D	L	GF	GA	GD	Pts	Qualification
1	Pakistan	6	6	0	0	17	3	+14	12	Advanced to Semi-finals
2	Australia	6	4	0	2	16	5	+11	8	Advanced to Semi-finals
3	Kenya	6	3	1	2	7	9	−2	7	
4	Japan (H)	6	3	0	3	6	6	0	6	
5	Great Britain	6	2	0	4	5	12	−7	4	
6	Rhodesia	6	1	1	4	4	16	−12	3	
7	New Zealand	6	1	0	5	6	10	−4	2	

Source: FIH
Rules for classification: 1) points; 2) goal difference; 3) games won; 4) head-to-head result.
(H) Hosts

11 October 1964
10:00

Rhodesia	0–0	Kenya
	Report

Umpires:
Sundaram Mudaliar (IND)
J.J. Jameson (IND)

11 October 1964
11:40

Pakistan	1–0	Japan
Hussain 11'	Report

Umpires:
A. Fransois Lathouwers (NED)
L.A. Elgershuizen (NED)

11 October 1964
14:15

Great Britain	0–7	Australia
	Report	Piper 4'; McWatters 12', 18', 31', 37'; Evans 23'; Pearce 56'

Umpires:
Walter Schinner (GER)
Karl Trapper (GER)

12 October 1964
10:00

Pakistan	5–2	Kenya
Hussain 20', 42', 61'; Zakauddin 22'; Dar 55'	Report	Sohal 32'; Panesar 34'

Umpires:
Karl Trapper (GER)
Walter Schinner (GER)

12 October 1964
11:40

Great Britain	0–2	New Zealand
	Report	Bygrave 12'; Judge 45'

Umpires:
Rino Lelli (ITA)
A. Fransois Lathouwers (NED)

12 October 1964
11:40

Australia	3–0	Rhodesia
McWatters 19'; Pearce 32', 42'	Report

Umpires:
J. Abraham van Donselaar (NED)
Gurusewak Singh (IND)

13 October 1964
10:00

Rhodesia	1–4	Great Britain
Ullyett 16'	Report	Deegan 20', 21'; Cadman 46', 57'

Umpires:
Gurusewak Singh (IND)
Rino Lelli (ITA)

13 October 1964
10:00

Australia	3–1	Japan
Smart 4'; Evans 44'; McWatters 64'	Report	Yuzaki 68'

Umpires:
J.J. Jameson (IND)
Sundaram Mudaliar (IND)

13 October 1964
11:40

Kenya	3–2	New Zealand
Mangat 2'; Mendonça 54'; Sohal 57'	Report	Byers 34'; Bygrave 44'

Umpires:
L.A. Elgershuizen (NED)
J. Abraham van Donselaar (NED)

15 October 1964
10:00

Great Britain	0–1	Pakistan
	Report	Dar 51'

Umpires:
Karl Trapper (GER)
A. Fransois Lathouwers (NED)

15 October 1964
11:40

Japan	1–0	New Zealand
Takashima 12'	Report

Umpires:
Walter Schinner (GER)
J.J Jameson (IND)

15 October 1964
11:40

Kenya	1–0	Australia
E. Fernandes 26'	Report

Umpires:
J. Abraham van Donselaar (NED)
L.A. Elgershuizen (NED)

16 October 1964
10:00

Japan	2–0	Kenya
Yamaguchi 27'; Tanaka 39'	Report

Umpires:
Walter Schinner (GER)
J. Abraham van Donselaar (NED)

16 October 1964
10:00

New Zealand	1–2	Australia
Patterson 63'	Report	Hodder 2'; Pearce 43'

Umpires:
Sundaram Mudaliar (IND)
J.J. Jameson (IND)

16 October 1964
11:40

Pakistan	6–0	Rhodesia
Afzal 6', 18', 57'; Mahmood 19'; Asad 22'; Hussain 62'	Report

Umpires:
Henry Douglas Kelly (NZL)
M.C. McLaren (GBR)

18 October 1964
10:00

Kenya	1–0	Great Britain
Sohal 8'	Report

Umpires:
Rino Lelli (ITA)
Sundaram Mudaliar (IND)

18 October 1964
14:15

Rhodesia	1–2	Japan
Spence 69'	Report	Takashima 34', 50'

Umpires:
Iqbal Hussain (PAK)
S.M. Ayub (PAK)

18 October 1964
14:15

New Zealand	0–2	Pakistan
	Report	Dar 19'; Afzal 51'

Umpires:
L.A. Elgershuizen (NED)
A. Fransois Lathouwers (NED)

19 October 1964
11:40

Japan	0–1	Great Britain
	Report	Cutter 61'

Umpires:
J.J. Jameson (IND)
Sundaram Mudaliar (IND)

19 October 1964
11:40

Australia	1–2	Pakistan
Nilan 13'	Report	Hussain 25'; Asad 46'

Umpires:
Walter Schinner (GER)
Karl Trapper (GER)

19 October 1964
11:40

New Zealand	1–2	Rhodesia
Patterson 61'	Report	Koch 67'; Tomlinson 68'

Umpires:
Lyle Thomson (GBR)
Rino Lelli (ITA)

==== Pool B ====
Pos	Team	Pld	W	D	L	GF	GA	GD	Pts	Qualification
1	India	7	5	2	0	18	4	+14	12	Advanced to Semi-finals
2	Spain	7	4	3	0	16	3	+13	11	Advanced to Semi-finals
3	Netherlands	7	4	1	2	20	4	+16	9	
4	United Team of Germany	7	2	5	0	9	4	+5	9	
5	Malaysia	7	2	2	3	11	13	−2	6	
6	Belgium	7	2	2	3	10	13	−3	6	
7	Canada	7	1	0	6	5	25	−20	2	
8	Hong Kong	7	0	1	6	3	26	−23	1	

Source: FIH
Rules for classification: 1) points; 2) goal difference; 3) games won; 4) head-to-head result.

11 October 1964
10:00

Spain	1–1	Netherlands
F. Amat 32'	Report	Terlingen 60'

Umpires:
John Balmer (GBR)
Kendrick Eaves (GBR)

11 October 1964
11:40

Malaysia	4–1	Hong Kong
Doraisamy 17'; Koh 19'; Kandiah 24', 56'	Report	Monteiro 40'

Umpires:
Jan Nieulant Pelkman (GBR)
Takashi Matsunawa (JPN)

11 October 1964
11:40

Canada	1–5	United Team of Germany
Young 4'	Report	Westphal 31', 47'; Ehrlich 39', 58'; Freiberger 64'

Umpires:
Gurcharan Lall Chopra (KEN)
Rino Lelli (ITA)

11 October 1964
14:15

India	2–0	Belgium
Prithipal 61'; Kaushik 67'	Report

Umpires:
T.C. Bedelis (AUS)
James McDowell (AUS)

12 October 1964
10:00

United Team of Germany	1–1	India
Freiberger 21'	Report	Prithipal 54'

Umpires:
Henry Douglas Kelly (NZL)
Jan Nieulant Pelkman (GBR)

12 October 1964
11:40

Hong Kong	0–2	Belgium
	Report	Bernaert 9'; Miserque 11'

Umpires:
S.M. Ayub (PAK)
Iqbal Hussain (PAK)

12 October 1964
14:15

Netherlands	5–0	Canada
Van Vroonhoven 16'; Zweerts 30', 44'; Voigt 34', 36'	Report

Umpires:
Baynard Handley (GBR)
Lyle Thomson (GBR)

12 October 1964
14:15

Spain	3–0	Malaysia
Dualde 24'; F. Amat 32', 54'	Report

Umpires:
M.C. McLaren (GBR)
Ahmad Abrar (PAK)

14 October 1964
10:00

Hong Kong	1–2	Canada
Kuldip 57'	Report	Raphael 38'; Chopping 66'

Umpires:
S.M. Ayub (PAK)
Gurcharan Lall Chopra (KEN)

14 October 1964
10:00

United Team of Germany	1–0	Netherlands
Ehrlich 55'	Report

Umpires:
James McDowell (AUS)
John Balmer (GBR)

14 October 1964
11:40

Belgium	3–3	Malaysia
Miserque 4'; Muschs 56'; Ravinet 64'	Report	Koh 32'; Chelliah 40', 53'

Umpires:
Lyle Thomson (GBR)
Baynard Handley (GBR)

14 October 1964
11:40

India	1–1	Spain
Mohinder 55'	Report	Dualde 37'

Umpires:
Hideo Ichikawa (JPN)
Takashi Matsunawa (JPN)

15 October 1964
10:00

Canada	0–3	Spain
	Report	Dualde 39'; J. Amat 59'; F. Amat 66'

Umpires:
Gurcharan Lall Chopra (KEN)
Iqbal Hussain (PAK)

15 October 1964
10:00

Netherlands	4–0	Belgium
Zweerts 27', 63', 69'; Terlingen 54'	Report

Umpires:
John Balmer (GBR)
James McDowell (AUS)

15 October 1964
14:15

Malaysia	0–0	United Team of Germany
	Report

Umpires:
Ahmad Abrar (PAK)
Hideo Ichikawa (JPN)

15 October 1964
14:15

Hong Kong	0–6	India
	Report	Pritiphal 20', 42'; Darshan 39', 50'; Harbinder 40', 46'

Umpires:
Kendrick Eaves (GBR)
T.C. Bedelis (AUS)

17 October 1964
10:00

Belgium	5–1	Canada
Van Beuren 12', 59'; Muschs 36', 44', 55'	Report	Warren 16'

Umpires:
Hideo Ichikawa (JPN)
Takashi Matsunawa (JPN)

17 October 1964
10:00

India	3–1	Malaysia
Prithipal 13', 53'; Harbinder 61'	Report	Van Huizen 68'

Umpires:
Baynard Handley (GBR)
Jan Nieulant Pelkman (GBR)

17 October 1964
11:40

Netherlands	7–0	Hong Kong
Coster van Voorhout 17'; Spits 21'; Zweerts 26', 65'; Voigt 31'; Van Gooswilligen 51'; Van T' Hooft 63'	Report

Umpires:
Henry Douglas Kelly (NZL)
Kendrick Eaves (GBR)

17 October 1964
11:40

Spain	1–1	United Team of Germany
Dualde 57'	Report	Ehrlich 36'

Umpires:
M.C. McLaren (GBR)
James McDowell (AUS)

18 October 1964
10:00

Netherlands	2–0	Malaysia
Van T' Hooft 48'; Van Vroonhoven 53'	Report

Umpires:
John Balmer (GBR)
Takashi Matsunawa (JPN)

18 October 1964
10:00

Canada	0–3	India
	Report	Harbinder 12', 66'; Prithipal 50'

Umpires:
Lyle Thomson (GBR)
Jan Nieulant Pelman (GBR)

18 October 1964
11:40

Spain	4–0	Hong Kong
Vidal 1'; Colomer 42'; Dualde 57'; F. Amat 68'	Report

Umpires:
Hideo Ichikawa (JPN)
M.C. McLaren (GBR)

18 October 1964
11:40

United Team of Germany	0–0	Belgium
	Report

Umpires:
James McDowell (AUS)
T.C. Bedelis (AUS)

19 October 1964
10:00

United Team of Germany	1–1	Hong Kong
Freiberger 69'	Report	Guterres 12'

Umpires:
Ahmad Abrar (PAK)
Gurusewak Singh (IND)

19 October 1964
10:00

Malaysia	3–1	Canada
Manikam 22'; Nonis 57'; Rajaratnam 61'	Report	Young 34'

Umpires:
T.C. Bedelis (AUS)
Gurcharan Lall Chopra (KEN)

19 October 1964
10:00

Belgium	0–3	Spain
	Report	F. Amat 15', 23', 49'

Umpires:
Iqbal Hussain (PAK)
S.M. Ayub (PAK)

19 October 1964
14:15

India	2–1	Netherlands
Prithipal 10'; Peter 58'	Report	Fiolet 44'

Umpires:
Baynard Handley (GBR)
Kendrick Eaves (GBR)

=== Classification round ===
Crossover
21 October 1964
Kenya (a.e.t.)	3
Netherlands	1
21 October 1964
United Team of Germany	5
Japan	1

Fifth Place
22 October 1964
Kenya	0
United Team of Germany	3

==== Crossover ====
21 October 1964
10:00

Kenya	3–1 (a.e.t.)	Netherlands
Eg. Fernandes 38'; Mangat 71'; L. Fernandes 79'	Report	Zweerts 29'

Umpires:
Hideo Ichikawa (JPN)
Sundaram Mudaliar (IND)

21 October 1964
12:00

United Team of Germany	5–1	Japan
Freiberger 18', 30'; Westphal 22', 65', 69'	Report	Kihara 13'

Umpires:
James McDowell (AUS)
J.J. Jameson (IND)

==== Fifth and sixth place ====
22 October 1964
13:55

Kenya	0–3	United Team of Germany
	Report	Lippert 6'; Ehrlich 41', 57'

Umpires:
Rino Lelli (ITA)
James McDowell (AUS)

== Medal round ==
Semi-finals
21 October 1964
Pakistan	3
Spain	0
21 October 1964
India	3
Australia	1

Gold-medal match
22 October 1964
Pakistan	0
India	1
Bronze-medal match
22 October 1964
Spain	2
Australia (a.e.t.)	3

=== Semi-finals ===
21 October 1964
12:15

Pakistan	3–0	Spain
Dar 16', 40'; Zakauddin 61'	Report

Umpires:
John Balmer (GBR)
Baynard Handley (GBR)

21 October 1964
13:55

India	3–1	Australia
Prithipal 22', 25'; Mohinder 23'	Report	Nilan 11'

Umpires:
A. Fransois Lathouwers (NED)
Walter Schinner (GER)

=== Bronze-medal match ===
23 October 1964
12:15

Spain	2–3 (a.e.t.)	Australia (bronze)
Macaya 37', 37'	Report	Pearce 16', 81'; McWatters 65'

Umpires:
L.A. Elgershuizen (NED)
J.J. Jameson (IND)

=== Gold-medal match ===
23 October 1964
14:20

(silver) Pakistan	0–1	India (gold)
	Report	Mohinder 40'

Umpires:
Walter Schinner (GER)
A. Fransois Lathouwers (NED)

== Final rankings ==
As per statistical convention in field hockey, matches decided in regular time are counted as wins and losses, while matches decided by penalty shoot-outs are counted as draws.

Pos	Team	Pld	W	D	L	GF	GA	GD	Pts	Final result
1st place, gold medalist(s)	India	9	7	2	0	22	5	+17	16	Gold Medal
2nd place, silver medalist(s)	Pakistan	8	7	0	1	20	4	+16	14	Silver Medal
3rd place, bronze medalist(s)	Australia	8	5	0	3	20	10	+10	10	Bronze Medal
4	Spain	9	4	3	2	18	9	+9	11	Fourth place
5	United Team of Germany	9	4	5	0	17	5	+12	13	Fifth place
6	Kenya	8	4	1	3	10	13	−3	9	Sixth place
7	Netherlands	8	4	1	3	21	7	+14	9	Eliminated in crossovers
8	Japan (H)	7	3	0	4	7	11	−4	6	Eliminated in crossovers
9	Malaysia	7	2	2	3	11	13	−2	6	Eliminated in group stage
9	Great Britain	6	2	0	4	5	12	−7	4	Eliminated in group stage
11	Belgium	7	2	2	3	10	13	−3	6	Eliminated in group stage
11	Rhodesia	6	1	1	4	4	16	−12	3	Eliminated in group stage
13	New Zealand	6	1	0	5	6	10	−4	2	Eliminated in group stage
13	Canada	7	1	0	6	5	25	−20	2	Eliminated in group stage
15	Hong Kong	7	0	1	6	3	26	−23	1	Eliminated in group stage

Source: FIH
(H) Hosts

== Goalscorers ==
There were 179 goals scored in 56 matches, for an average of 3.2 goals per match.

10 goals

- (India) Prithipal Singh

8 goals

- (Netherlands) Guillaum Zweerts
- (Spain) Francisco Amat

7 goals

- (Australia) Donald McWatters

6 goals

- (Australia) Eric Pearce
- (Germany) Dieter Ehrlich
- (Pakistan) Manzoor Hussain Atif

5 goals

- (Germany) Karl-Heinz Freiberger
- (Germany) Rolf Westphal
- (India) Harbinder Singh
- (Pakistan) Munir Dar
- (Spain) Eduardo Dualde

4 goals

- (Belgium) André Muschs
- (Pakistan) Muhammad Afzal

3 goals

- (India) Mohinder Lal
- (Japan) Akio Takashima
- (Kenya) Avtar Singh Sohal
- (Netherlands) Jaap Voigt

2 goals

- (Australia) Raymond Evans
- (Australia) Patrick Nilan
- (Belgium) Yves Bernaert
- (Belgium) Eric van Beuren
- (Canada) Jonathan Young
- (United Kingdom) Jonathan Cadman
- (United Kingdom) James Deegan
- (India) Darshan Singh
- (Kenya) Amar Singh Mangat
- (Malaysia) Kandiah Anandarajah
- (Malaysia) Koh Hock Seng
- (Malaysia) Chelliah Paramalingam
- (Netherlands) Francis van 't Hooft
- (Netherlands) Theodorus Terlingen
- (Netherlands) Theo van Vroonhoven
- (New Zealand) Phillip Bygrave
- (New Zealand) Alan Patterson
- (Pakistan) Muhammad Asad Malik
- (Pakistan) Khwaja Zakauddin
- (Spain) Ignacio Macaya

1 goal

- (Australia) Robin Hodder
- (Australia) Desmond Piper
- (Australia) Donald Smart
- (Belgium) Guy Miserque
- (Belgium) Claude Ravinet
- (Canada) Richard Chopping
- (Canada) Alan Raphael
- (Canada) Victor Warren
- (Germany) Lothar Lippert
- (United Kingdom) Geoffrey Cutter
- (Hong Kong) Kuldip Gosal
- (Hong Kong) Lionel Guterres
- (Hong Kong) Jonathan Monteiro
- (India) Hari Pal Kaushik
- (India) Jonathan Peter
- (Japan) Seiji Kihara
- (Japan) Hiroshi Tanaka
- (Japan) Junichi Yamaguchi
- (Japan) Tsuneya Yuzaki
- (Kenya) Edgar Fernandes
- (Kenya) Egbert Fernandes
- (Kenya) Leo Fernandes
- (Kenya) Aloysius Mendonça
- (Kenya) Surjeet Singh Panesar
- (Malaysia) Lawrence van Huizen
- (Malaysia) Doraisamy Munusamy
- (Malaysia) Douglas Nonis
- (Malaysia) Manikam Shanmuganathan
- (Malaysia) Rajaratnam Yogeswaran
- (Netherlands) Charles Coster van Voorhout
- (Netherlands) Franciscus Fiolet
- (Netherlands) Jan van Gooswilligen
- (Netherlands) Nicolaas Spits
- (New Zealand) Peter Byers
- (New Zealand) Bruce Judge
- (Pakistan) Khalid Mahmood
- (Rhodesia) Lloyd Koch
- (Rhodesia) Ronald Spence
- (Rhodesia) Desmond Tomlinson
- (Rhodesia) Robert Ullyett
- (Spain) Jaime Amat
- (Spain) José Colomer
- (Spain) Jorge Vidal

== Sources ==
- Tokyo Organizing Committee (1964). The Games of the XVIII Olympiad: Tokyo 1964, vol. 2.
