= India at the Olympics =

- Flag of India
- IOC code: IND
- NOC: Indian Olympic Association
- Website: olympic.ind.in
- Medals Ranked 58th: Gold 10 Silver 10 Bronze 21 Total 41

Summer appearances
- 1900; 1904–1912; 1920; 1924; 1928; 1932; 1936; 1948; 1952; 1956; 1960; 1964; 1968; 1972; 1976; 1980; 1984; 1988; 1992; 1996; 2000; 2004; 2008; 2012; 2016; 2020; 2024; 2028

Winter appearances
- 1964; 1968; 1972–1984; 1988; 1992; 1994; 1998; 2002; 2006; 2010; 2014; 2018; 2022; 2026

Other related appearances
- Pakistan (1948–pres.); Bangladesh (1984–pres.); Independent Olympic Participants (2014)

India first participated at the Olympic Games in 1900, becoming the first Asian nation to do so. Norman Pritchard represented the country and won two medals, both silver, in athletics. The nation first sent a team to the Summer Olympic Games in 1920 and has participated in every Summer Games since then. India has competed at several Winter Olympic Games after its debut in 1964.

Indian athletes have won 41 medals, all at the Summer Games. At a period of time during the 1900s, the Indian men's field hockey team was dominant in the Olympic Games, winning eleven medals in twelve Olympics between 1928 and 1980 including eight gold medals of which six were won consecutively from 1928 to 1956. India's best performance happened at the 2020 Games, with seven medals, including a gold and two silver.

== History ==
=== Before independence ===
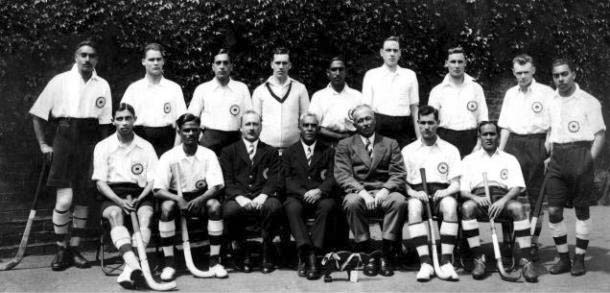
Indian field hockey team that won the gold medal at 1928 Olympics

India made its first appearance at the 1900 Summer Olympics as part of British India (1858–1947), becoming the first Asian nation to participate in the Olympic Games. A lone athlete Norman Pritchard represented the country and won two silver medals in athletics. India was classified 19th in the overall medal table, which represents its best placement till date. India did not compete in the next three Summer Olympic Games. At the behest of then Governor of Bombay George Lloyd, Indian businessman Dorabji Tata secured representation for British India at the International Olympic Committee, enabling it to independently participate in the 1920 Summer Olympics. India sent a contingent of six competitors including four athletes and two wrestlers with two support staff. The Indian Olympic movement was then established during the 1920s. In 1923, a provisional All India Olympic Committee was formed, and in February 1924, the All India Olympic Games (later National Games of India) were held to select a team for the 1924 Summer Olympics at Paris. The Indian delegation at the Paris Olympics consisted of 14 competitors including eight in athletics and four in tennis, led by team manager Harry Buck.

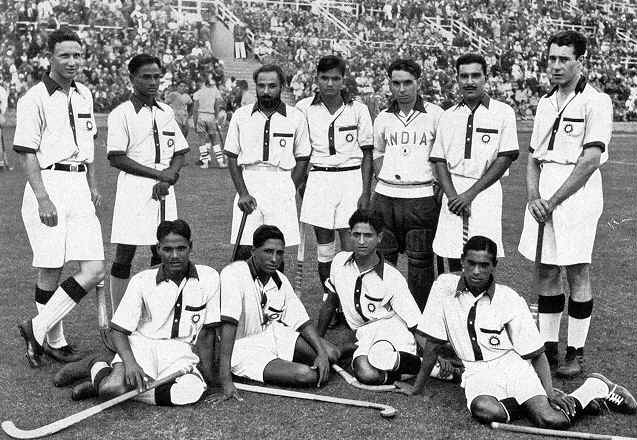
Indian hockey team at 1936 Berlin Olympics

In 1927, the provisional Indian Olympic Committee was recognized by the International Olympic Committee and formally became the Indian Olympic Association (IOA). The organization was formed to promote the development of sports in India, host the national games, and select teams for the Olympics. For the 1928 Summer Olympics in Amsterdam, it selected eight competitors, which included seven in athletics and one swimmer. The Indian Hockey Federation, which had been established earlier in 1925, sent the men's team to the 1928 Games. The hockey team won India's first gold medal in the Olympics at Amsterdam. This was the first gold medal won by any nation from Asia at the modern Olympic Games. For the 1932 Games, the Indian contingent consisted of the field hockey team and five athletes. For the subsequent 1936 Games, India sent a contingent consisting of the field hockey team and eight athletes, who competed in four sports. The only medals in the last two Games came from the Indian field hockey team, which won three consecutive gold medals from 1928 to 1936. The victory run included the largest victory margin in Olympics history after India defeated United States 24–1 in 1932 and the largest margin of victory in an Olympic final during the 8–1 defeat of Germany in the final in 1936.

=== After independence ===
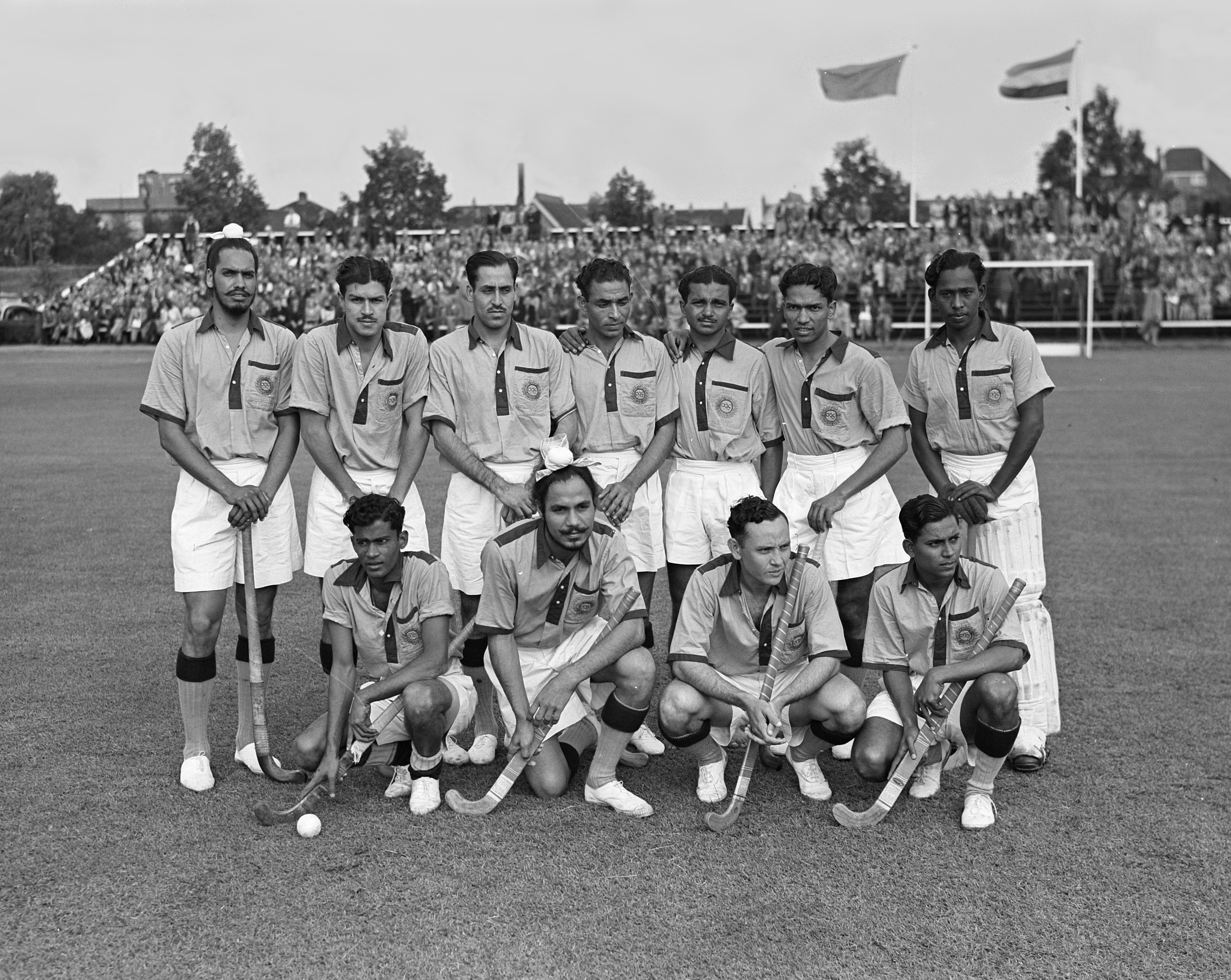
Indian field hockey team that won the first gold medal after independence at the 1948 London Olympics

India gained its independence in 1947. It sent its first contingent as an independent country for the 1948 Summer Olympics held at London. The Indian contingent consisted of 79 athletes, who competed across ten sports and included country's first participation in arts, boxing, cycling, football, and water polo events. The Indian field hockey team won the lone medal, a gold, which was the first medal for India as an independent nation. The 1952 Summer Olympics marked the first time India sent women competitors to the Games. The Indian contingent consisted of 64 competitors including four women with first time participants in gymnastics and shooting events. Wrestler K. D. Jadhav won a bronze medal, the first individual medal for independent India. India sent a contingent of 59 competitors for the 1956 Games at Melbourne and the only medal came from the Indian field hockey team, which won a then record sixth straight gold medal in a single event at the Games. The Indian contingent consisted of 45 competitors for the next Summer Olympics at Rome. The country won a single silver medal from field hockey after the team lost in the final, which was its first loss in the Olympic Games since the 1928.

India made its Winter Olympics debut at the 1964 Winter Olympics in Innsbruck with Jeremy Bujakowski competing in the men's downhill event in alpine skiing. (Note: The first medals for alpinism were awarded at closing ceremony of the 1924 Winter Olympics in Chamonix, to the members of the unsuccessful 1922 British Mount Everest expedition led by Charles Granville Bruce. The medals were awarded to 21 people: the thirteen British expedition members, one Nepalese soldier and seven porters who died during the ascent and were mostly Indian. Their names were inscribed on a memorial cairn erected at the Everest Base Camp. As the medal was awarded to a team of people from various nationalities, the International Olympic Committee recognizes it as a medal awarded to the mixed team rather than any individual nation.) In the subsequent Summer Olympics held in Tokyo in the same year, India sent a contingent of 53 competitors including two participants for the diving event for the first time. The men's field hockey team won the gold medal, for the country's only medal at the Games.

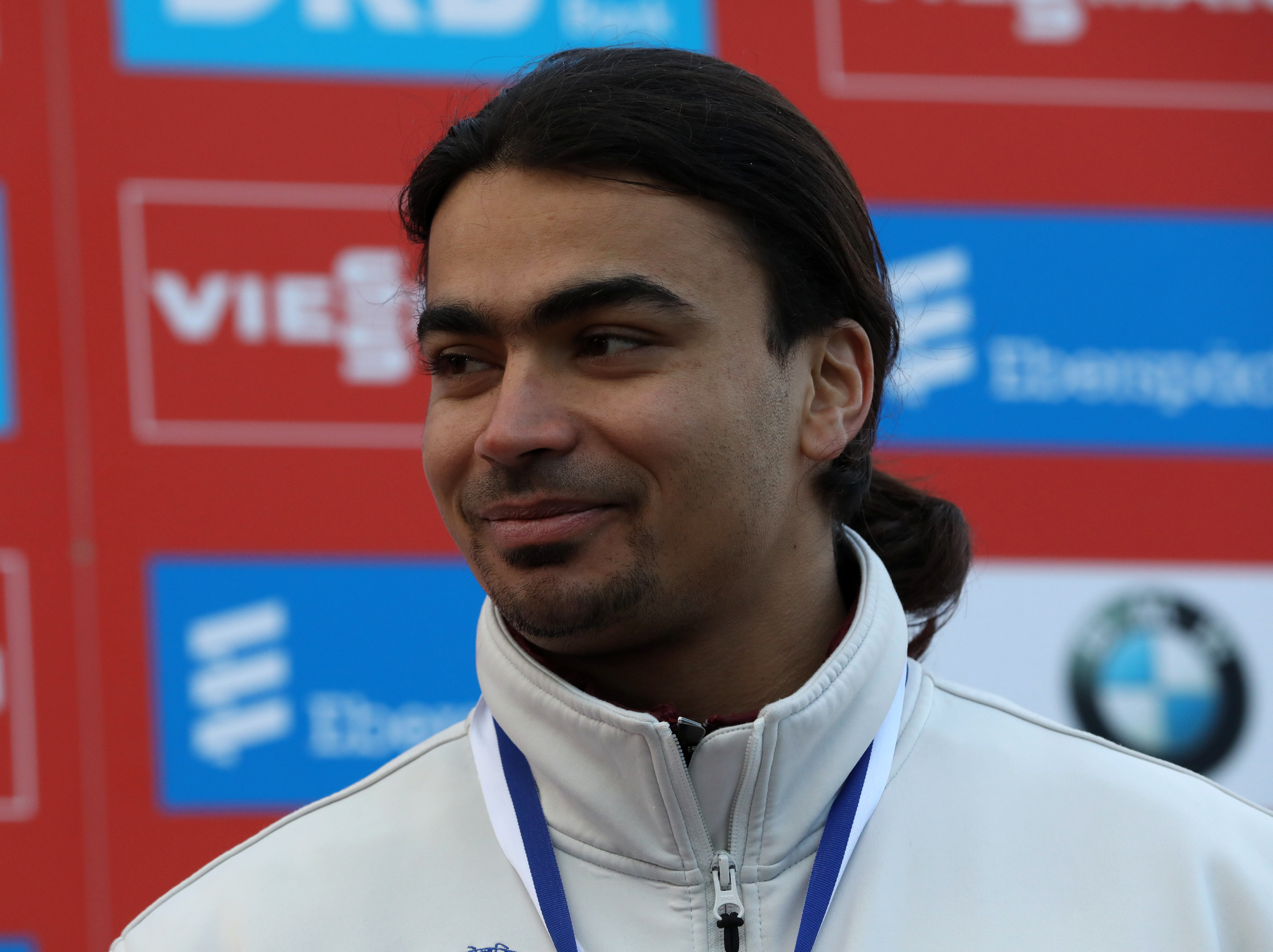
Shiva Keshavan, who appeared in record six Winter Olympics

In the 1968 Winter Olympics held in Grenoble, Bujakowski was again the only participant representing India. India sent its smallest delegation since independence, consisting of 25 athletes to the 1968 Summer Olympics at Mexico City. India did not participate in the four subsequent Winter Olympic Games from 1972 to 1984. In the 1972 Summer Olympics at Munich, 41 Indian athletes competed across seven sports including two competitors in the badminton for the first time. The only medals in the previous two Summer Olympics were the bronze medals won by the men's field hockey team. In 1976 Summer Olympics at Montreal, India entered 26 athletes, but failed to win a medal for the first time since 1924.

The Indian delegation for the 1980 Summer Olympics at Moscow consisted of 76 competitors, the second largest since independence with first time participants in the equestrian event. The only medal again came from the men's hockey team which won their record extending eighth Olympic gold in a single event. This was also the last time the Indian field hockey team won the gold medal at the Olympics. India sent 48, 46 and 52 athletes to the subsequent three Summer Olympics in 1984, 1988, and 1992 respectively, but failed to win a single medal across the three Olympic Games. In between, India returned to compete in the 1988 Winter Olympics after a gap of nearly 20 years. The Indian contingent consisted of three athletes including the first women participant Shailaja Kumar. The country entered two athletes to the 1992 Winter Olympics before missing the subsequent 1994 Winter Olympics. India entered 49 competitors across 13 events at the 1996 Summer Olympics in Atlanta. Tennis player Leander Paes won a bronze medal in the men's singles event, the country's first Olympic medal in nearly 16 years and became the first Indian individual medalist since 1952. India's lone participant in the subsequent 1998 Winter Olympics was Shiva Keshavan, who would become the Indian with most appearances in the Olympic Games after his sixth appearance in 2018.

=== 21st century ===
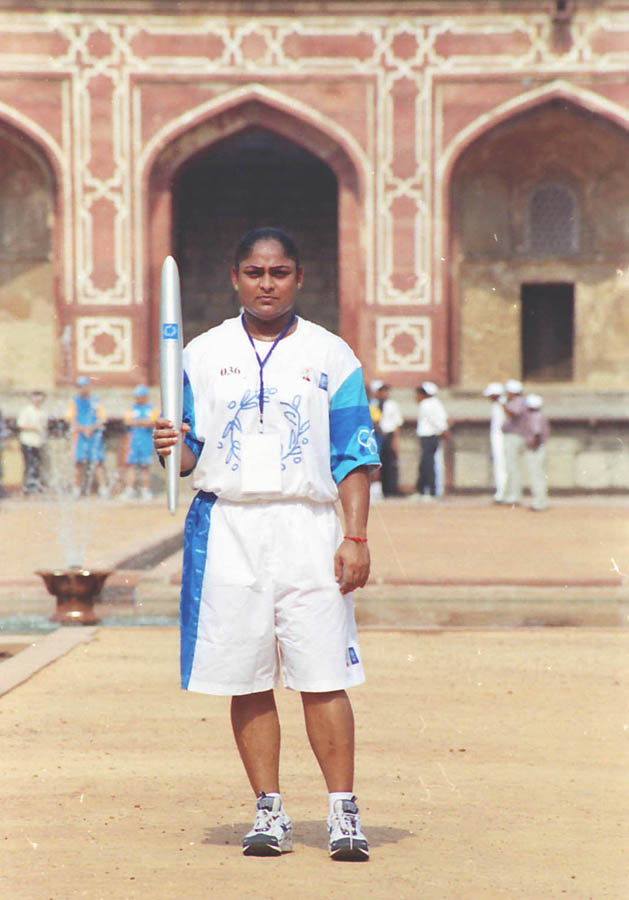
Karnam Malleshwari, the first Indian woman to win an Olympic medal in 2000

The Indian contingent for the 2000 Sydney Olympics consisted of 65 athletes with athletes competing in the rowing event for the first time. The country's only medal was a bronze won by Karnam Malleswari in the women's 69 kg weightlifting event. It was the first Olympic medal won by an Indian woman. Keshavan was again the only competitor for India at the 2002 Winter Olympics. The Indian contingent for the 2004 Athens Olympics consisted of 73 athletes and the only medal came from shooter Rajyavardhan Singh Rathore, who won the silver medal in men's double trap event. The Indian delegation for the 2006 Winter Olympics consisted of four athletes, two in alpine skiing, one in cross-country skiing, and one in luge. At the 2008 Beijing Olympics, the Indian contingent of 57 athletes competed in 12 sports. India registered its best performance at the time, winning three medals in the event including a gold and two bronze medals. Abhinav Bindra became the first Indian individual gold medalist after his victory in the men's air rifle event. Vijender Singh and Sushil Kumar got the country's first Olympic medal in boxing and second medal in wrestling respectively. Three Indian athletes represented the country in the 2010 Winter Olympics at Vancouver.

The Indian contingent for the 2012 Summer Olympics consisted of 83 members, the highest till then. The country won six medals, including two silver and four bronze, the highest count of medals as of then. Sushil Kumar won a silver medal to become the first Indian since independence with multiple individual Olympic medals. Shooter Vijay Kumar won the other silver medal in shooting. Amongst the bronze medalists, Saina Nehwal won India's first medal in badminton and boxer Mary Kom became the first Indian woman to win a medal in boxing. Other bronze medalists included shooter Gagan Narang and wrestler Yogeshwar Dutt. In December 2012, the Indian Olympic Association was suspended by the International Olympic Committee due to government interference in the autonomy of the country's National Olympic Committee (NOC). Due to the suspension, three Indian athletes entered the 2014 Winter Olympics as Independent Olympic Participants. The suspension was revoked when the games were underway and two competitors resumed the competition under the Indian flag.

For the 2016 Summer Olympics, India sent more than 100 athletes for the first time with 117 competitors. India won two medals including a silver and a bronze. Shuttler P. V. Sindhu became the first Indian woman to win an Olympic silver medal and the youngest Indian woman medalist after she won a silver medal in badminton. Sakshi Malik became the first Indian female wrestler to win an Olympic medal with her bronze medal in the women's freestyle 58 kg category. Two Indian athletes represented the country in the 2018 Winter Olympics at PyeongChang.

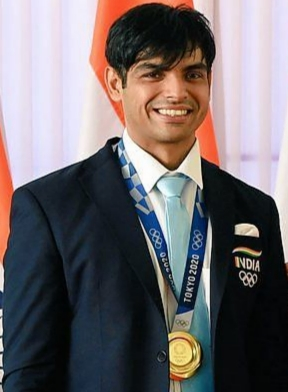
Neeraj Chopra won India's first gold medal in athletics in 2020

India sent its largest delegation consisting of 119 athletes to the 2020 Summer Olympics. India registered its most successful performance in a single Games with seven medals including one gold, two silver and four bronze. Neeraj Chopra won India's first gold medal in athletics after his victory in the men's javelin throw event. In the women's 49 kg event, Saikhom Mirabai Chanu won India's first silver medal in weight lifting. Sindhu became the first Indian female athlete and the second Indian to win medals in consecutive Summer Games in individual events after she won a bronze in women's badminton. The men's field hockey team won a bronze medal to record their first Olympic medal since 1980.Ravi Kumar Dahiya won a silver medal in men's freestyle wrestling. Other bronze medalists included Lovlina Borgohain in women's boxing and Bajrang Punia in men's freestyle wrestling. India entered one male alpine skier, Arif Khan for the 2022 Winter Olympics.

The Indian contingent for the 2024 Summer Olympics consisted of 110 competitors across 16 sports. India won six medals in total including one silver and five bronze, three of which came from the shooting events. Chopra won the only silver medal for India in the men's javelin throw event and became the first Indian individual medalist to have won a gold and silver at the Olympics. Manu Bhaker won two bronze medals including the first Indian medal at the Games in the air pistol event and another along with Sarabjot Singh in the mixed pistol team event. She became the first Indian since independence to win two medals in a single Olympics. Swapnil Kusale then won another bronze medal in shooting. The men's field hockey team won the bronze medal for the second consecutive Olympics. Aman Sehrawat won a bronze medal for India in the men's freestyle 57kg wrestling event to become the youngest Indian to win an Olympic medal.

== Timeline of participation ==
Olympic Year/s	Teams		
1900–1932	India		
1936	India		
1948–1968	India	Pakistan	
1972–1980	India	Pakistan	
1984–present	India	Pakistan	Bangladesh

== Medal tables ==
=== Medals by Summer Games ===
Games	Athletes	Gold	Silver	Bronze	Total	Rank
(French Third Republic) 1900 Paris	1	0	2	0	2	19
(United States) 1904 St. Louis	did not participate					
(United Kingdom) 1908 London	did not participate					
(Sweden) 1912 Stockholm	did not participate					
(Belgium) 1920 Antwerp	6	0	0	0	0	–
(French Third Republic) 1924 Paris	14	0	0	0	0	–
(Netherlands) 1928 Amsterdam	21	1	0	0	1	23
(United States) 1932 Los Angeles	20	1	0	0	1	19
(Nazi Germany) 1936 Berlin	27	1	0	0	1	20
(United Kingdom) 1948 London	79	1	0	0	1	22
(Finland) 1952 Helsinki	64	1	0	1	2	26
(Australia) 1956 Melbourne	59	1	0	0	1	24
(Italy) 1960 Rome	45	0	1	0	1	32
(Japan) 1964 Tokyo	53	1	0	0	1	24
1968 Mexico City	25	0	0	1	1	42
(West Germany) 1972 Munich	41	0	0	1	1	43
(Canada) 1976 Montreal	20	0	0	0	0	–
(Soviet Union) 1980 Moscow	76	1	0	0	1	23
(United States) 1984 Los Angeles	48	0	0	0	0	–
(South Korea) 1988 Seoul	46	0	0	0	0	–
(Spain) 1992 Barcelona	53	0	0	0	0	–
(United States) 1996 Atlanta	49	0	0	1	1	71
(Australia) 2000 Sydney	65	0	0	1	1	71
(Greece) 2004 Athens	73	0	1	0	1	65
(China) 2008 Beijing	56	1	0	2	3	50
(United Kingdom) 2012 London	83	0	2	4	6	55
(Brazil) 2016 Rio de Janeiro	117	0	1	1	2	67
(Japan) 2020 Tokyo	119	1	2	4	7	48
(France) 2024 Paris	110	0	1	5	6	71
(United States) 2028 Los Angeles	future event					
(Australia) 2032 Brisbane	future event					
Total (26/30)	1,370	10	10	21	41	57

=== Medals by Winter Games ===
Games	Athletes	Gold	Silver	Bronze	Total	Rank
(Austria) 1964 Innsbruck	1	0	0	0	0	–
(France) 1968 Grenoble	1	0	0	0	0	–
1972–1984	did not participate					
(Canada) 1988 Calgary	3	0	0	0	0	–
(France) 1992 Albertville	2	0	0	0	0	–
(Norway) 1994 Lillehammer	did not participate					
(Japan) 1998 Nagano	1	0	0	0	0	–
(United States) 2002 Salt Lake City	1	0	0	0	0	–
(Italy) 2006 Turin	4	0	0	0	0	–
(Canada) 2010 Vancouver	3	0	0	0	0	–
(Russia) 2014 Sochi	2 (Note: Three India athletes qualified for the 2014 Winter Olympics but Shiva Keshavan participated as an Independent Olympic Participant due to the ongoing suspension of Indian Olympic Association at the time. The suspension was revoked during the course of Games, which enabled the other two athletes to compete under the Indian flag.)	0	0	0	0	–
(South Korea) 2018 Pyeongchang	2	0	0	0	0	–
(China) 2022 Beijing	1	0	0	0	0	–
(Italy) 2026 Milano Cortina	2	0	0	0	0	–
(France) 2030 French Alps	future event					
(United States) 2034 Utah	future event					
Total (12/25)	23	0	0	0	0	–

== Medals by sport ==
Sport	Rank	(gold) Gold	(silver) Silver	(bronze) Bronze	Total
Field hockey	2nd	8	1	4	13
Athletics	59th	1	3	0	4
Shooting	33rd	1	2	4	7
Wrestling	48th	0	2	6	8
Badminton	9th	0	1	2	3
Weightlifting	53rd	0	1	1	2
Boxing	68th	0	0	3	3
Tennis	33rd	0	0	1	1
Total	60th	10	10	21	41

=== Best results in non-medaling sports ===
Sport	Result	Participant(s)	Event	Games
Football	4th	National football team	Men's tournament	Melbourne 1956
Artistic gymnastics	4th	Dipa Karmakar	Women's vault	Rio 2016
Golf	4th	Aditi Ashok	Women's individual	Tokyo 2020
Archery	4th	Dhiraj Bommadevara; Ankita Bhakat	Mixed team	Paris 2024
Cycling	9th	Rusi Mulla Feroze	Men's sprint	London 1948
Cycling	9th	Adi Havewala; Jehangoo Amin; Rohinton Noble; Piloo Sarkari	Men's team pursuit	London 1948
Basketball	12th	National basketball team	Men's tournament	Moscow 1980
Water polo	12th	National water polo team	Men's water polo	London 1948
Table tennis	R16	Manika Batra; Sreeja Akula	Women's singles	Paris 2024
Cycling	19th	Rohinton Noble	Men's track time trial	London 1948
Diving	25th	Ansuya Prasad	Men's 3 m springboard	Tokyo 1964
Fencing	R32	Bhavani Devi	Women's sabre	Tokyo 2020

== Medalists ==
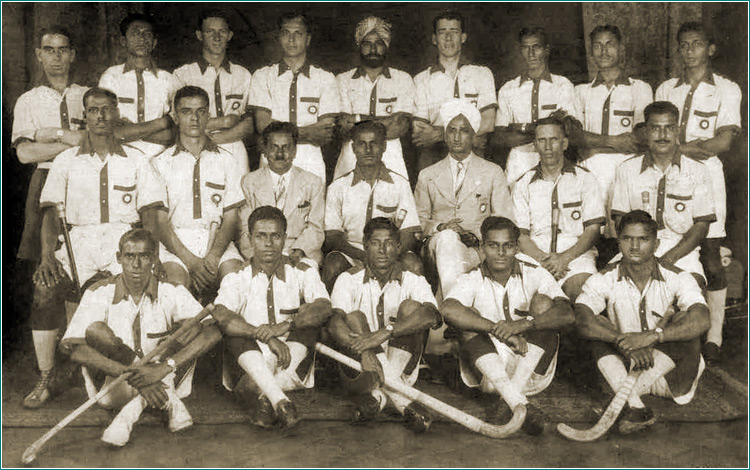
Men's field hockey team which won the gold medal in 1936

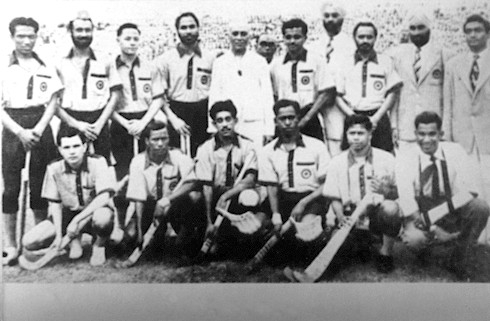
Gold Medal-winning men's field hockey team from 1952 Helsinki

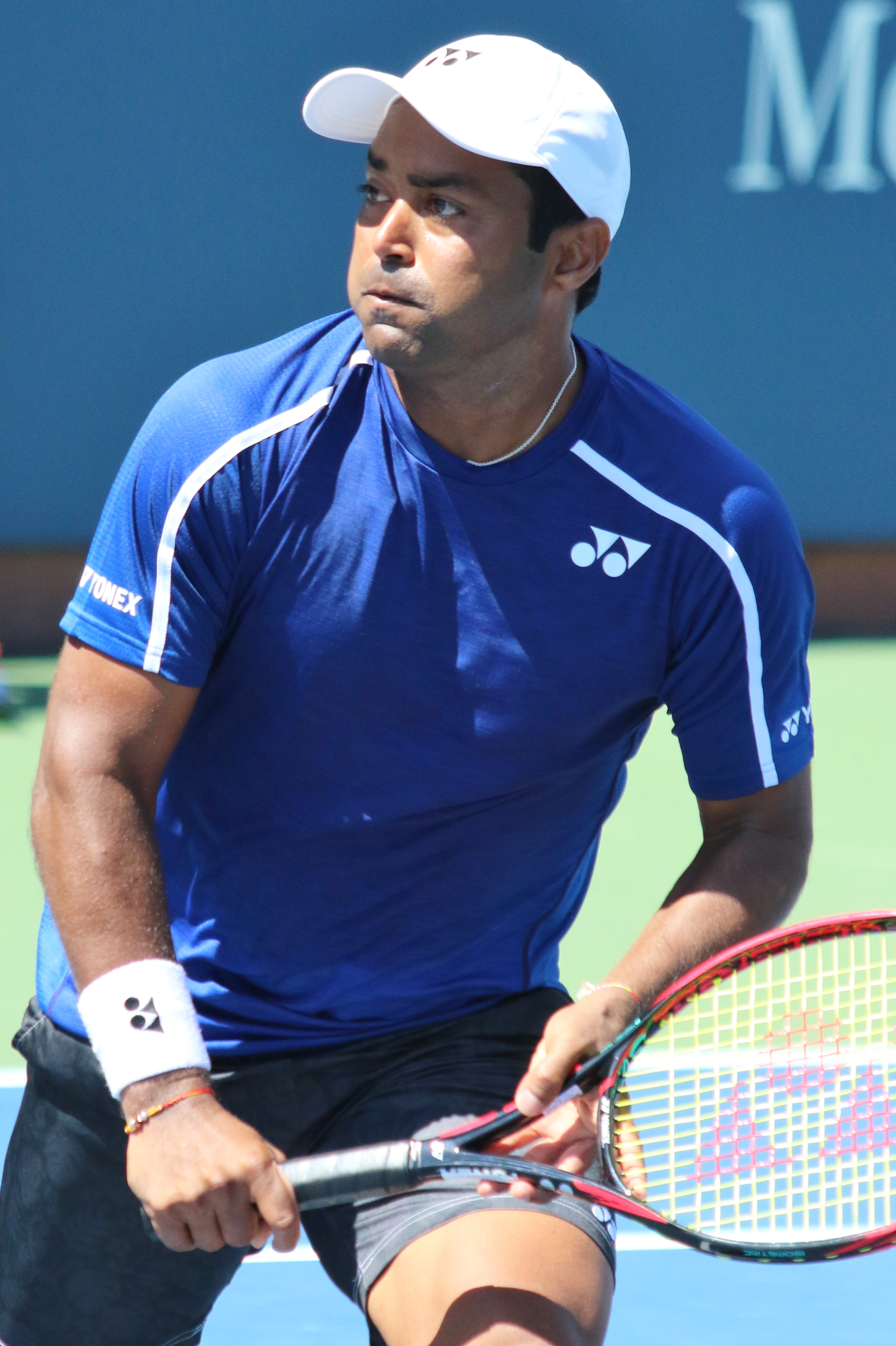
Leander Paes won a bronze medal in 1996, India's first Olympic medal in nearly 16 years

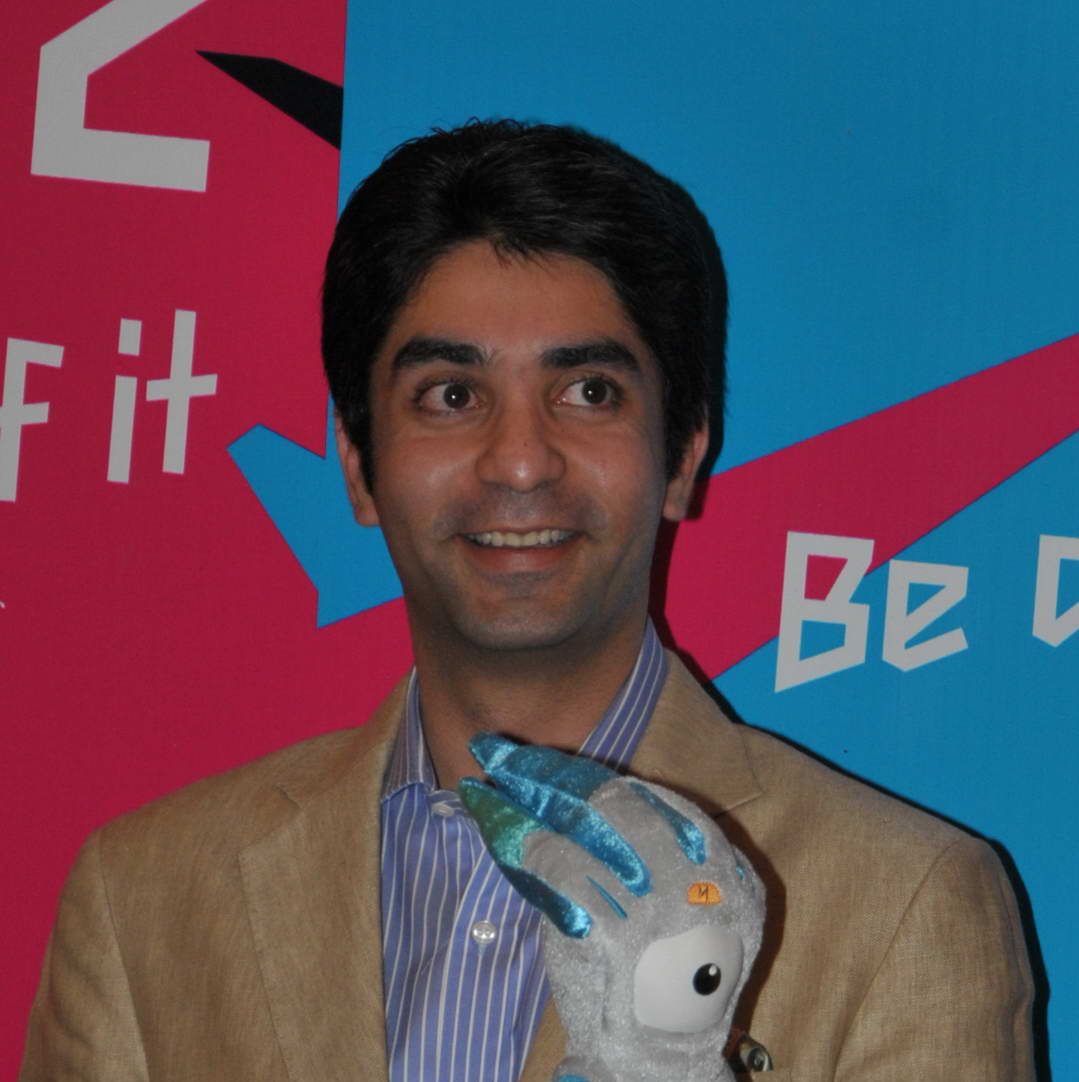
Abhinav Bindra, India's first individual gold medalist

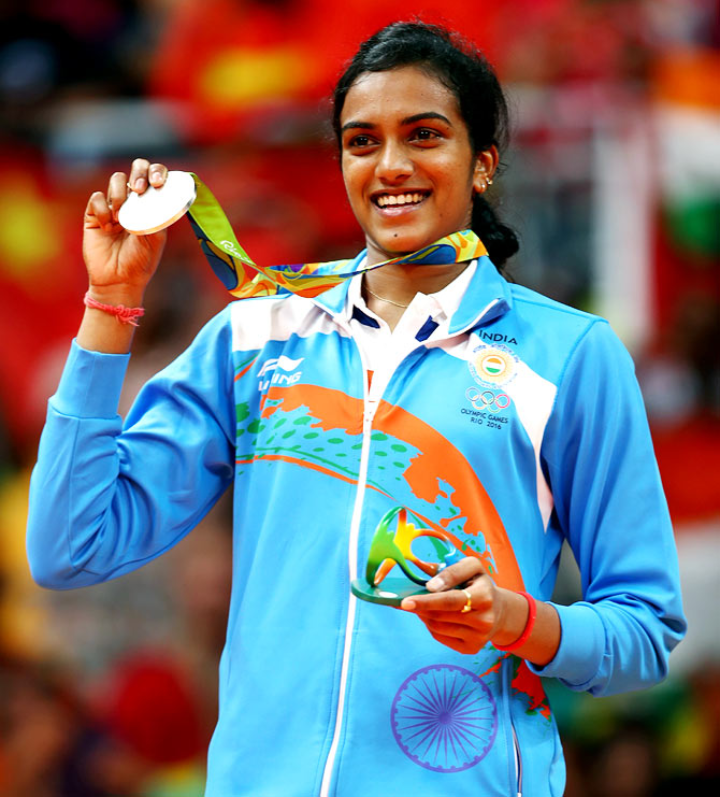
P. V. Sindhu, the first Indian woman to win multiple Olympic medals

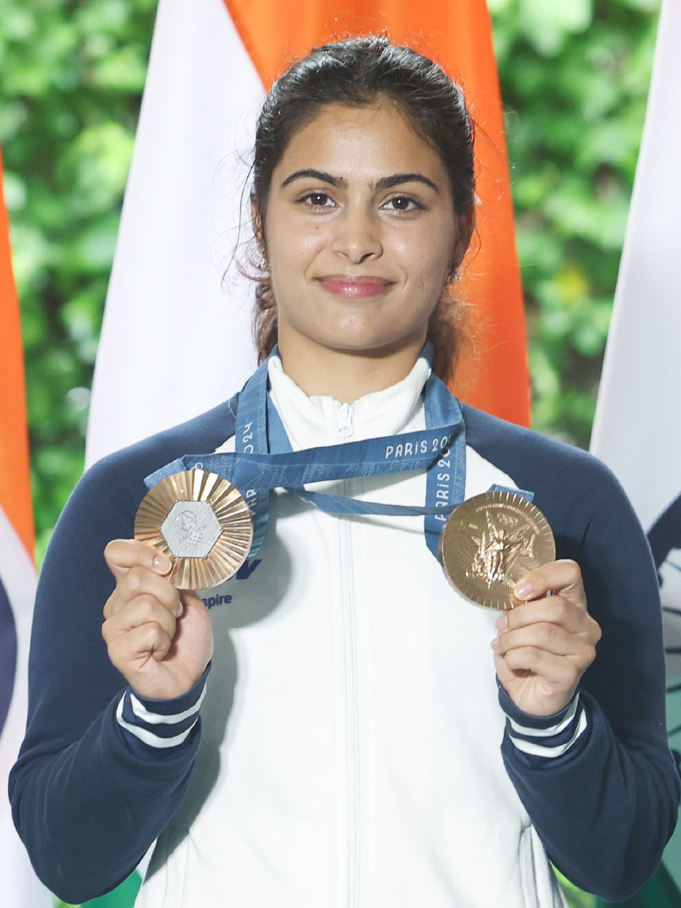
Manu Bhaker, the only Indian woman to win multiple medals at a single Olympics

Medal	Medalist	Sport	Event	Date
(France) 1900 Paris
(silver) Silver	Norman Pritchard	Athletics	Men's 200m	22 July 1900
(silver) Silver	Norman Pritchard	Athletics	Men's 200m hurdles	16 July 1900
(Netherlands) 1928 Amsterdam
(gold) Gold	Men's field hockey team: Richard Allen Dhyan Chand Michael Gateley William Goodsir-Cullen Leslie Hammond Feroze Khan George Marthins Rex Norris Broome Pinniger Michael Rocque Frederic Seaman Ali Shaukat Jaipal Singh Sayed Yusuf Kher Singh Gill	Field hockey	Men's tournament	26 May 1928
(United States) 1932 Los Angeles
(gold) Gold	Men's field hockey team: Richard Allen Muhammad Aslam Lal Bokhari Frank Brewin Richard Carr Dhyan Chand Leslie Hammond Arthur Hind Sayed Jaffar Masud Minhas Broome Pinniger Gurmit Singh Kullar Roop Singh William Sullivan Carlyle Tapsell	Field hockey	Men's tournament	11 August 1932
(Germany) 1936 Berlin
(gold) Gold	Men's field hockey team: Richard Allen Dhyan Chand Ali Dara Lionel Emmett Peter Fernandes Joseph Galibardy Earnest Goodsir-Cullen Mohammed Hussain Sayed Jaffar Ahmed Khan Ahsan Mohomed Khan Mirza Masood Cyril Michie Baboo Nimal Joseph Phillips Shabban Shahab-ud-Din Gurcharan Singh Grewal Roop Singh Carlyle Tapsell	Field hockey	Men's tournament	15 August 1936
(United Kingdom) 1948 London
(gold) Gold	Men's field hockey team: Leslie Claudius Keshav Dutt Walter de Sousa Lawrie Fernandes Ranganathan Francis Gerry Glackan Akhtar Hussain Patrick Jansen Amir Kumar Kishan Lal Leo Pinto Jaswant Singh Rajput Latif-ur Rehman Reginald Rodrigues Balbir Singh Sr. Randhir Singh Gentle Grahanandan Singh K. D. Singh Trilochan Singh Maxie Vaz	Field hockey	Men's tournament	12 August 1948
(Finland) 1952 Helsinki
(gold) Gold	Men's field hockey team: K. D. Singh Leslie Claudius Meldric Daluz Keshav Dutt Chinadorai Deshmutu Ranganathan Francis Raghbir Lal Govind Perumal Muniswamy Rajgopal Balbir Singh Sr. Randhir Singh Gentle C. S. Dubey Udham Singh Dharam Singh Grahanandan Singh Chaman Singh Gurung	Field hockey	Men's tournament	24 July 1952
(bronze) Bronze	K. D. Jadhav	Wrestling	Men's freestyle 57 kg	23 July 1952
(Australia) 1956 Melbourne
(gold) Gold	Men's field hockey team: Leslie Claudius Ranganathan Francis Haripal Kaushik Amir Kumar Raghbir Lal Shankar Lakshman O. P. Malhotra Govind Perumal Amit Singh Bakshi Raghbir Singh Bhola Balbir Singh Sr. Hardyal Singh Randhir Singh Gentle Balkrishan Singh Gurdev Singh Udham Singh Bakshish Singh Charles Stephen	Field hockey	Men's tournament	6 December 1956
(Italy) 1960 Rome
(silver) Silver	Men's field hockey team: Joseph Antic Leslie Claudius Jaman Lal Sharma Mohinder Lal Shankar Lakshman John Peter Govind Sawant Raghbir Singh Bhola Udham Singh Charanjit Singh Jaswant Singh Joginder Singh Prithipal Singh	Field hockey	Men's tournament	9 September 1960
(Japan) 1964 Tokyo
(gold) Gold	Men's field hockey team: Haripal Kaushik Mohinder Lal Shankar Lakshman Bandu Patil John Peter Syed Ali Udham Singh Charanjit Singh Darshan Singh Dharam Singh Gurbux Singh Harbinder Singh Jagjit Singh Joginder Singh Prithipal Singh Balbir Singh Kullar Rajendran Christie	Field hockey	Men's tournament	23 October 1964
1968 Mexico City
(bronze) Bronze	Men's field hockey team: Rajendran Christie Krishnamurty Perumal John Peter Inam-ur Rahman Munir Sait Ajitpal Singh Balbir Singh Kullar Balbir Singh Kular Balbir Singh Gurbux Singh Harbinder Singh Harmik Singh Inder Singh Prithipal Singh Tarsem Singh Jagjit Singh	Field hockey	Men's tournament	26 October 1968
(Germany) 1972 Munich
(bronze) Bronze	Men's field hockey team: B. P. Govinda Charles Cornelius Manuel Frederick Michael Kindo V. J. Philips Ashok Kumar M. P. Ganesh Krishnamurty Perumal Ajitpal Singh Harbinder Singh Harcharan Singh Harmik Singh Kulwant Singh Mukhbain Singh Virinder Singh Vece Paes	Field hockey	Men's tournament	10 September 1972
(Soviet Union) 1980 Moscow
(gold) Gold	Men's field hockey team: Vasudevan Baskaran Bir Bahadur Chettri Sylvanus Dung Dung Mervyn Fernandis Zafar Iqbal Maharaj Krishan Kaushik Charanjit Kumar M. M. Somaya Allan Schofield Mohammed Shahid Davinder Singh Gurmail Singh Amarjit Singh Rana Rajinder Singh Jr. Ravinder Pal Singh Surinder Singh Sodhi	Field hockey	Men's tournament	29 July 1980
(United States) 1996 Atlanta
(bronze) Bronze	Leander Paes	Tennis	Men's singles	3 August 1996
(Australia) 2000 Sydney
(bronze) Bronze	Karnam Malleswari	Weightlifting	Women's 69 kg	19 September 2000
(Greece) 2004 Athens
(silver) Silver	Rajyavardhan Singh Rathore	Shooting	Men's double trap	17 August 2004
(China) 2008 Beijing
(gold) Gold	Abhinav Bindra	Shooting	Men's 10m air rifle	11 August 2008
(bronze) Bronze	Vijender Singh	Boxing	Middleweight	20 August 2008
(bronze) Bronze	Sushil Kumar	Wrestling	Men's freestyle 66 kg	21 August 2008
(United Kingdom) 2012 London
(silver) Silver	Vijay Kumar	Shooting	Men's 25m rapid fire pistol	3 August 2012
(silver) Silver	Sushil Kumar	Wrestling	Men's freestyle 66 kg	12 August 2012
(bronze) Bronze	Saina Nehwal	Badminton	Women's singles	4 August 2012
(bronze) Bronze	Mary Kom	Boxing	Women's flyweight	8 August 2012
(bronze) Bronze	Gagan Narang	Shooting	Men's 10m air rifle	30 July 2012
(bronze) Bronze	Yogeshwar Dutt	Wrestling	Men's freestyle 60 kg	11 August 2012
(Brazil) 2016 Rio
(silver) Silver	P. V. Sindhu	Badminton	Women's singles	19 August 2016
(bronze) Bronze	Sakshi Malik	Wrestling	Women's freestyle 58 kg	17 August 2016
(Japan) 2020 Tokyo
(gold) Gold	Neeraj Chopra	Athletics	Men's javelin throw	7 August 2021
(silver) Silver	Mirabai Chanu	Weightlifting	Women's 49 kg	24 July 2021
(silver) Silver	Ravi Kumar Dahiya	Wrestling	Men's freestyle 57 kg	5 August 2021
(bronze) Bronze	P. V. Sindhu	Badminton	Women's singles	1 August 2021
(bronze) Bronze	Lovlina Borgohain	Boxing	Women's welterweight	4 August 2021
(bronze) Bronze	Men's field hockey team: Dilpreet Singh Rupinder Pal Singh Surender Kumar Manpreet Singh Hardik Singh Gurjant Singh Simranjeet Singh Mandeep Singh Harmanpreet Singh Lalit Upadhyay P. R. Sreejesh Sumit Walmiki Nilakanta Sharma Shamsher Singh Varun Kumar Birendra Lakra Amit Rohidas Vivek Prasad	Field hockey	Men's tournament	5 August 2021
(bronze) Bronze	Bajrang Punia	Wrestling	Men's freestyle 65 kg	7 August 2021
(France) 2024 Paris
(silver) Silver	Neeraj Chopra	Athletics	Men's javelin throw	8 August 2024
(bronze) Bronze	Manu Bhaker	Shooting	Women's 10m air pistol	28 July 2024
(bronze) Bronze	Manu Bhaker; Sarabjot Singh	Shooting	Mixed 10m air pistol team	30 July 2024
(bronze) Bronze	Swapnil Kusale	Shooting	Men's 50m rifle 3 positions	1 August 2024
(bronze) Bronze	Men's field hockey team: Harmanpreet Singh Jarmanpreet Singh Abhishek Nain Manpreet Singh Hardik Singh Gurjant Singh Sanjay Rana Mandeep Singh Lalit Upadhyay P. R. Sreejesh Sumit Walmiki Shamsher Singh Raj Kumar Pal Amit Rohidas Vivek Prasad Sukhjeet Singh	Field hockey	Men's tournament	8 August 2024
(bronze) Bronze	Aman Sehrawat	Wrestling	Men's freestyle 57 kg	9 August 2024

== Multi-medalists ==
=== Individual ===
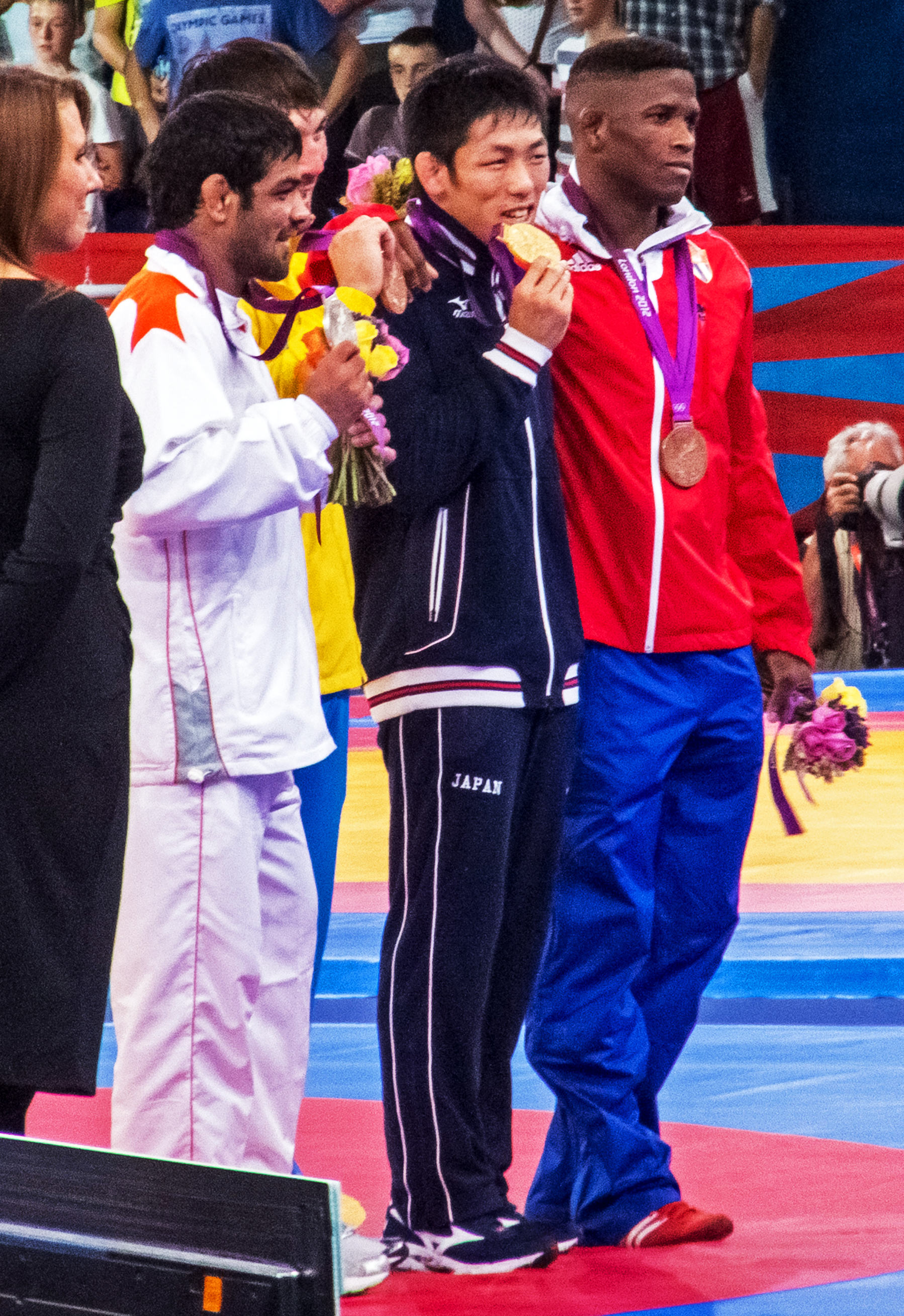
Sushil Kumar (left), the first Indian to win multiple individual Olympic medals since independence.

Athlete	Sport	Games	(gold) Gold	(silver) Silver	(bronze) Bronze	Total
Neeraj Chopra	Athletics	Tokyo 2020 Paris 2024	1	1	0	2
Norman Pritchard	Athletics	Paris 1900	0	2	0	2
Sushil Kumar	Wrestling	Beijing 2008 London 2012	0	1	1	2
P. V. Sindhu	Badminton	Rio 2016 Tokyo 2020	0	1	1	2
Manu Bhaker	Shooting	Paris 2024	0	0	2	2

=== Team ===
Athlete	Sport	Games	(gold) Gold	(silver) Silver	(bronze) Bronze	Total
Leslie Claudius	Field hockey	1948, 1952, 1956, 1960	3	1	0	4
Udham Singh	Field hockey	1952, 1956, 1960, 1964	3	1	0	4
Richard Allen	Field hockey	1928, 1932, 1936	3	0	0	3
Dhyan Chand	Field hockey	1928, 1932, 1936	3	0	0	3
Ranganathan Francis	Field hockey	1948, 1952, 1956	3	0	0	3
Randhir Singh Gentle	Field hockey	1948, 1952, 1956	3	0	0	3
Balbir Singh Sr.	Field hockey	1948, 1952, 1956	3	0	0	3
Shankar Lakshman	Field hockey	1956, 1960, 1964	2	1	0	3
Haripal Kaushik	Field hockey	1956, 1960, 1964	2	1	0	3
Carlyle Tapsell	Field hockey	1932, 1936	2	0	0	2
Roop Singh	Field hockey	1932, 1936	2	0	0	2
Govind Perumal	Field hockey	1952, 1956	2	0	0	2
Amir Kumar	Field hockey	1948, 1956	2	0	0	2
Jaswant Singh Rajput	Field hockey	1948, 1952	2	0	0	2
Leslie Hammond	Field hockey	1928, 1932	2	0	0	2
Broome Pinniger	Field hockey	1928, 1932	2	0	0	2
Sayed Jaffar	Field hockey	1932, 1936	2	0	0	2
Keshav Dutt	Field hockey	1948, 1952	2	0	0	2
Grahanandan Singh	Field hockey	1948, 1952	2	0	0	2
K. D. Singh	Field hockey	1948, 1952	2	0	0	2
Raghbir Lal	Field hockey	1952, 1956	2	0	0	2
John Peter	Field hockey	1960, 1964, 1968	1	1	1	3
Prithipal Singh	Field hockey	1960, 1964, 1968	1	1	1	3
Joginder Singh	Field hockey	1960, 1964	1	1	0	2
Charanjit Singh	Field hockey	1960, 1964	1	1	0	2
Raghbir Singh Bhola	Field hockey	1956, 1960	1	1	0	2
Mohinder Lal	Field hockey	1960, 1964	1	1	0	2
Balkrishan Singh	Field hockey	1956, 1960	1	1	0	2
Harbinder Singh	Field hockey	1964, 1968, 1972	1	0	2	3
Rajendran Christie	Field hockey	1964, 1968	1	0	1	2
Balbir Singh Kullar	Field hockey	1964, 1968	1	0	1	2
Jagjit Singh	Field hockey	1964, 1968	1	0	1	2
Gurbux Singh	Field hockey	1964, 1968	1	0	1	2
Krishnamurthy Perumal	Field hockey	1968, 1972	0	0	2	2
Ajitpal Singh	Field hockey	1968, 1972	0	0	2	2
Harmik Singh	Field hockey	1968, 1972	0	0	2	2
Harmanpreet Singh	Field hockey	2020, 2024	0	0	2	2
Manpreet Singh	Field hockey	2020, 2024	0	0	2	2
Hardik Singh	Field hockey	2020, 2024	0	0	2	2
Gurjant Singh	Field hockey	2020, 2024	0	0	2	2
Mandeep Singh	Field hockey	2020, 2024	0	0	2	2
Lalit Upadhyay	Field hockey	2020, 2024	0	0	2	2
P. R. Sreejesh	Field hockey	2020, 2024	0	0	2	2
Sumit Walmiki	Field hockey	2020, 2024	0	0	2	2
Shamsher Singh	Field hockey	2020, 2024	0	0	2	2
Amit Rohidas	Field hockey	2020, 2024	0	0	2	2
Vivek Prasad	Field hockey	2020, 2024	0	0	2	2

== Milestones ==
Milestone	Medallist	Games	Sport	Medals	Ref(s)
First medallist First individual multi-medallist	Norman Pritchard	(France) 1900 Paris	Athletics	(silver) Silver (silver) Silver	
First gold medallists	Men's field hockey team	(Netherlands) 1928 Amsterdam	Field hockey	(gold) Gold	
First gold medallists post-independence	Men's field hockey team	(United Kingdom) 1948 London	Field hockey	(gold) Gold	
First individual medallist post-independence	K. D. Jadhav	(Finland) 1952 Helsinki	Wrestling	(bronze) Bronze	
First woman medallist	Karnam Malleswari	(Australia) 2000 Sydney	Weightlifting	(bronze) Bronze	
First individual gold medallist	Abhinav Bindra	(China) 2008 Beijing	Shooting	(gold) Gold	
First individual multi-medallist post-independence	Sushil Kumar	(China) 2008 Beijing (United Kingdom) 2012 London	Wrestling	(bronze) Bronze (silver) Silver	
First woman multi-medallist	P. V. Sindhu	(Brazil) 2016 Rio de Janeiro (Japan) 2020 Tokyo	Badminton	(silver) Silver (bronze) Bronze	
First multi-medallist post-independence from single Olympics	Manu Bhaker	(France) 2024 Paris	Shooting	(bronze) Bronze (bronze) Bronze	

== Dominance of men's field hockey team ==
The Indian men's field hockey team has won the most medals in the sport in the Olympic competition. The team has won 13 medals, including eight gold medals, of which six were won consecutively, from 1928 to 1956.

=== Olympic records ===
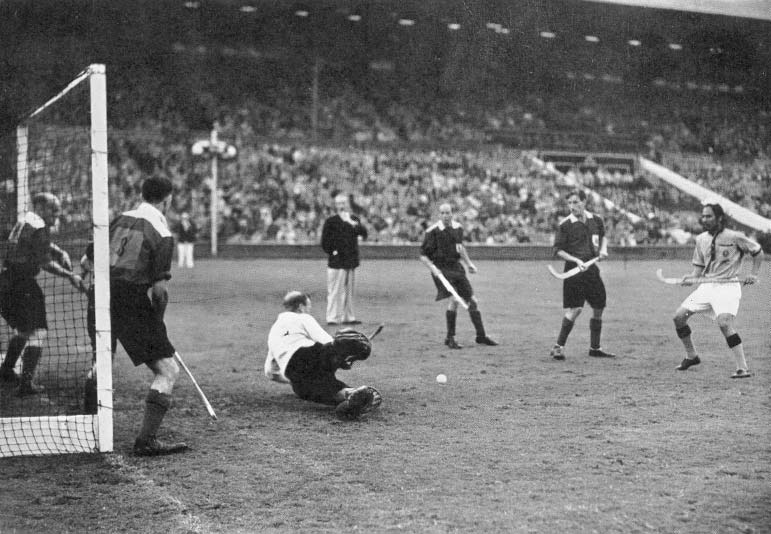
India scoring their third goal against Britain in the final of the 1948 Olympics

The men's hockey team holds multiple Olympic records in the sport:

- Most appearances: 22
- Most consecutive appearances: 18 (1928 Amsterdam – 2004 Athens)
- Most matches played: 142
- Most wins: 87
- Most medals: 13 (8 gold, 1 silver, 4 bronze)
- Most titles: 8 gold medals
- Most consecutive medals won: 10 medals (7 gold, 1 silver, 2 bronze), 1928 Amsterdam – 1972 Munich
- Most consecutive titles: 6 gold medals (1928 Amsterdam – 1956 Melbourne)
- Most goals scored: 473
- Most goals scored in a single tournament: 43 (1980 Moscow)
- Fewest goals conceded in a single tournament: nil (1928 Amsterdam, 1956 Melbourne)
- Biggest margin of victory: India 24–1 United States (1932 Los Angeles)
- Biggest margin of victory at an Olympic final: India 8–1 Germany (1936 Berlin)
- Longest winning streak: 30 matches (1928 Amsterdam – 1960 Rome)
- Most goals scored by a player in a match: 10 goals by Roop Singh vs United States (1932 Los Angeles)
- Most goals scored by a player in an Olympic final: 5 goals by Balbir Singh Sr. vs Netherlands (1952 Helsinki)

=== Results ===
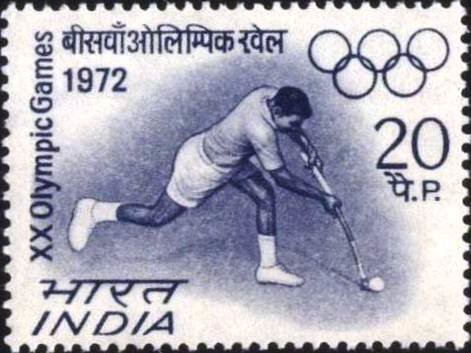
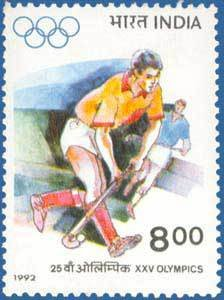
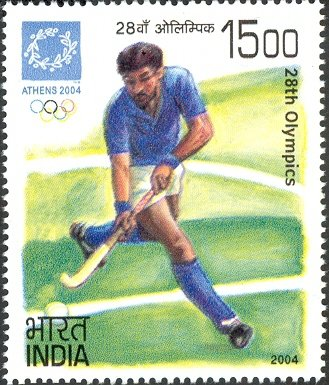
Stamps released by India Post commemorating Olympic victories

Olympic performance
Games	Ranking
1908 London	Did not enter
1920 Antwerp	Did not enter
1928 Amsterdam	Gold
1932 Los Angeles	Gold
1936 Berlin	Gold
1948 London	Gold
1952 Helsinki	Gold
1956 Melbourne	Gold
1960 Rome	Silver
1964 Tokyo	Gold
1968 Mexico City	Bronze
1972 Munich	Bronze
1976 Montreal	7th
1980 Moscow	Gold
1984 Los Angeles	5th
1988 Seoul	6th
1992 Barcelona	7th
1996 Atlanta	8th
2000 Sydney	7th
2004 Athens	7th
2008 Beijing	Did not qualify
2012 London	12th
2016 Rio de Janeiro	8th
2020 Tokyo	Bronze
2024 Paris	Bronze

== See also ==
- Sport in India
- List of flag bearers for India at the Olympics
