= India at the 1956 Summer Olympics =

- IOC code: IND
- NOC: Indian Olympic Association

in Melbourne/Stockholm
- Competitors: 59 (58 men, 1 woman) in 8 sports
- Flag bearer: Balbir Singh Sr.
- Medals Ranked 24th: Gold 1 Silver 0 Bronze 0 Total 1

Summer Olympics appearances (overview)
- 1900; 1904–1912; 1920; 1924; 1928; 1932; 1936; 1948; 1952; 1956; 1960; 1964; 1968; 1972; 1976; 1980; 1984; 1988; 1992; 1996; 2000; 2004; 2008; 2012; 2016; 2020; 2024

India competed at the 1956 Summer Olympics in Melbourne, Australia. 59 competitors, 58 men and 1 woman, took part in 32 events in 8 sports. Their solitary medal, a gold, came in men's field hockey.

== Medalists ==
Medals by sport
Sport	1st place, gold medalist(s)	2nd place, silver medalist(s)	3rd place, bronze medalist(s)	Total
Field hockey	1	0	0	1
Total	1	0	0	1

Medal	Name	Sport	Event
Gold	Leslie Claudius; Ranganathan Francis; Haripal Kaushik; Amir Kumar; Raghbir Lal; Shankar Lakshman; Govind Perumal; Amit Singh Bakshi; Raghbir Singh Bhola; Balbir Singh Dosanjh; Hardyal Singh Garchey; Randhir Singh Gentle; Balkishan Singh Grewal; Gurdev Singh Kullar; Udham Singh Kullar; Bakshish Singh; Charles Stephen	Field hockey	Men's Field hockey

== Athletics ==
Men's High Jump

- Ajit Singh

- Qualification Round — 1.96m (14)

Men's 200 metres

- Milkha Singh

- Heat — 22.47 (→ did not advance)

Men's 800 metres

- Sohan Singh

- Heat — 1.52.4(→ did not advance)

Women's 100 metres

- Mary Rao

- Heat — DNF(→ did not advance)

== Field hockey ==
Squad

Leslie Claudius
Ranganathan Francis
Haripal Kaushik
Amir Kumar
Raghbir Lal
Shankar Lakshman
O. P. Malhotra
Govind Perumal
Amit Singh Bakshi
Raghbir Singh Bhola
Balbir Singh Dosanjh
Hardyal Singh Garchey
Randhir Singh Gentle
Balkishan Singh Grewal
Gurdev Singh Kullar
Udham Singh Kullar
Bakshish Singh
Charles Stephen

Group standings

Rank	Team	Pld	W	D	L	GF	GA	Pts	(India)	(United Kingdom)	(Afghanistan)	(United States)
1.	India	3	3	0	0	36	0	6	X	6:0	14:0	16:0
2.	Singapore	3	2	0	1	11	7	4	0:6	X	5:0	6:1
3.	Afghanistan	3	1	0	2	5	20	2	0:14	0:5	X	5:1
4.	United States	3	0	0	3	2	27	0	0:16	1:6	1:5	X

Semi-finals

3 December 1956

India	1–0	United Team of Germany

Melbourne Cricket Ground, Melbourne

Gold medal match

6 December 1956

India	1–0	Pakistan
Gentle 38'	Report

Melbourne Cricket Ground, Melbourne

== Football ==
First round

India	w/o ^{1}	Hungary

Melbourne

Quarterfinals

1 December 1956
12:00

Australia	2–4	India
Morrow 17' 41'	Report	D'Souza 9' 33' 50'; Kittu 80'

Melbourne
Referee: C.H. Wensveen (IDN)

Semifinals

4 December 1956
12:00

Yugoslavia	4–1	India
Papec 54' 65'; Veselinović 57'; Salam 78' (o.g.)	Report	D'Souza 52'

Melbourne
Attendance: 16.626
Referee: Latyshev (USSR)

Bronze Medal match

7 December 1956
14:15

Bulgaria	3–0	India
Diev 37' 60'; Milanov 42'	Report

Melbourne
Attendance: 21.236
Referee: Latyshev (USSR)

== Gymnastics ==
Three athletes represented India in Gymnastics at the 1956 Olympics: Pritam Singh, Sham Lal, and Anant Ram.

== Shooting ==
Two shooters represented India in 1956.

50 m rifle, three positions

- Harihar Banerjee
- Haricharan Shaw

== Swimming ==
Men

Athlete	Event	Heat		Semifinal		Final	
Athlete	Event	Time	Rank	Time	Rank	Time	Rank
Sri Chand Bajaj	100 m freestyle	1:01.6	34	Did not advance			
Shamsher Khan	200 m breaststroke	3:17.0	15	—N/a		Did not advance	
Shamsher Khan	200 m butterfly	3:06.3	19	—N/a		Did not advance	

== Wrestling ==
Key:

- VT - Victory by Fall.
- Pt - Decision by Points.
- Pd - Decision by Points but Judges disagree.

Men's freestyle

Athlete	Event	Round 1 Result	Round 2 Result	Round 3 Result	Round 4 Result	Round 5 Result	Round 6 Result	Rank
Baban Daware	−52 kg	Asai (JPN); L ^{VT}	Lee J-g (KOR); W ^{Pt}	Tsalkalamanidze (URS); L ^{VT}	did not advance			−
Tarashkeswar Pandey	−57 kg	Kämmerer (EUA); L ^{Pt}	Vercouteren (BEL); W ^{Pt}	Yaghoubi (IRN); L ^{VT}	did not advance			−
Ram Sarup	−62 kg	Mewis (BEL); L ^{Pt}	Bye	Salimullin (URS); L ^{Pt}	did not advance			−
Lakhshmi Kant Pandey	−67 kg	Nizzola (ITA); L ^{VT}	Güngör (TUR); L ^{Pt}	did not advance				−
Devi Singh	−73 kg	Sorouri (IRN); L ^{VT}	Ikeda (JPN); L ^{VT}	did not advance			—N/a	−
B. Singh	−79 kg	Davies (AUS); W ^{Pt}	van Zyl (RSA); L ^{Pt}	Lindblad (SWE); L ^{VT}	did not advance			−
Lila Ram	+87 kg	Richmond (GBR); L ^{Pt}	Kaplan (TUR); L ^{VT}	did not advance				−
