= Balbir Singh =

Balbir Singh is a name of Indian origin, especially common among the Punjabi Sikhs. It may refer to:

== Field hockey players ==
- Balbir Singh Sr. (1924–2020), Indian field hockey player
- Balbir Singh Jr. (1932–2021), Indian field hockey player and Indian Army major
- Balbir Singh Kullar (1942–2020), Indian field hockey player and Punjab Police officer
- Balbir Singh Kular (born 5 April 1945), Indian field hockey player and Indian Army colonel
- Balbir Singh Grewal (born 21 September 1945), Indian field hockey player and Indian Railways officer
- Balbir Singh Sidhu (field hockey) (1931–2016), Kenyan field hockey player

== Politicians ==
- Balbir Singh (Punjab politician), MLA and Punjab, India politician
- Balbir Singh (Haryana politician) (born 1974), Indian politician
- Balbir Singh (Himachal Pradesh politician) (born 1963), Indian politician
- Balbir Singh (Jammu and Kashmir politician) (active from 1967); see Billawar (Vidhan Sabha constituency)
- Balbir Singh Rajewal, farmer leader and Punjab, India politician
- Balbir Singh Seechewal (born 1962), Indian activist and MP
- Balbir Singh Sidhu (politician) Punjab MLA (2012-22)
- Balbir Singh Verma (born 1971), Indian politician

== Other people ==
- Balbir Singh (Ragi) (1933–2020)
- Balbir Singh Chauhan (born 1949), chairman of the 21st Law Commission of India
- Balbir Singh Hriksen Thapa (1915–2003), known as Yogi Naraharinath
- Balbir Singh Pama, Lieutenant General in the Indian Army
- Mrs Balbir Singh (1912–1994), Indian cookbook author
- Balbir Singh (scholar) (1896–1974), Indian scholar and writer

== Other uses ==
- Murder of Balbir Singh Sodhi, a crime shortly after the September 11 terror attacks
- Balbir Singh Juneja Indoor Stadium, Indoor stadium in Raipur, Chhattisgarh
