= Shankar Lakshman =

Indian field hockey player (1933–2006)

Honorary Captain Shankar Lakshman Padma Shri
- Born: Shankar Laxman; 7 July 1933; Mhow, British India
- Died: 29 April 2006 (aged 72); Mhow, India
- Military career
- Allegiance: India
- Branch: Indian Army
- Service years: 1947 – 1978
- Rank: Honorary Captain
- Nickname: Rock of Gibraltor
- Unit: 5 Maratha Light Infantry
- Awards: Padma Shri
- Sports career
- Height: 5 ft 5.5 in (166 cm)
- Sport: Field hockey
- Position: Goalkeeper
Medal record
Men's Field Hockey
Representing India
Olympic Games
Men's field hockey
Gold medal – first place	1956 Melbourne	Team competition
Silver medal – second place	1960 Rome	Team competition
Gold medal – first place	1964 Tokyo	Team competition
Asian Games
Silver medal – second place	1958 Tokyo	Team competition
Silver medal – second place	1962 Jakarta	Team competition
Gold medal – first place	1966 Bangkok	Team competition

Honorary Captain Shankar Lakshman (7 July 1933 – 29 April 2006) was an Indian hockey player who played as a goalkeeper. He was part of the Indian team in the 1956, 1960 and 1964 Olympics, that won two gold medals and one silver medal. He was the first goalkeeper to become captain of an international hockey team and was awarded the Arjuna award and the Padma Shri by the Indian government. He was captain of the Indian team which won the gold in the 1966 Asian Games. After missing the selection for the 1968 Olympics, Lakshman quit hockey. He remained with the Army, retiring in 1979 as a captain of the Maratha Light Infantry. He died in 2006 after suffering gangrene in one leg in Mhow.

== Early life ==
Shankar was born on 7 July 1933, in Mhow a small cantonment town in the Indore District of the Malwa region of Madhya Pradesh, he belonged to the Shekhawat community of Rajasthan. Shankar began his sporting career as a footballer. He was the captain of the football team of Kodaria village in Mhow. He joined the Indian Army as a bandsman in the year 1947. He served in the 5th Battalion of Maratha Light Infantry.

== Career ==
After joining the army, he made the switch to hockey from football. Starting his career in 1955 playing for Services. He earned praises for his goalkeeping, and was selected for the national team, on the back of an impressive run in the domestic circuit.

== 1956 Olympics ==
Coached by Sardar Harbail Singh, and managed by Air Commander O.P. Mehra, India looked poised for another gold medal. The team's captain Balbir Singh Sr. had suffered a fracture in his favoured right hand during the tournament, but the then 2-time Olympic gold medallist set an example by playing through the pain barrier and in the process, notched up his 3rd gold and India's only medal at the 1956 Olympics at the iconic Melbourne Cricket Ground (MCG). The finals were set up between arch-rivals India and Pakistan, where Shankar kept goal, the only goal came from Randhir Singh Gentle, to beat Pakistan 1–0 and India claimed its 6th consecutive Gold in Field Hockey, while Lakshman was praised for his great saves, against Pakistan's forwards.

== 1960 Olympics ==
The team, captained by Leslie Walter Claudius, hoping for their seventh consecutive Gold medal, had a mixture of youth and experience. Goalkeeper Lakshman made for a formidable figure in the defense.

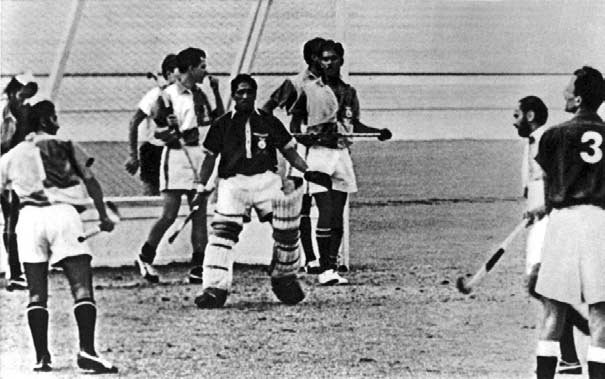
Lakshman during the 1960 Olympics final against Pakistan

Once again the finals were set up between India and Pakistan, it turned out to be a classic as Pakistan went ahead in the 11th minute through a goal by inside-left Naseer Bunda, right-in Hamidi had passed the ball to Nur Alam, the right-out, who in a flash and with a brief run hit the ball in the direction of the ever alert Bunda who dodged one to flick the ball on the left of the net, the one which a goal keeper of Lakshman's calibre could not stop, India lost 1–0, and were thus dethroned as the Kings of Hockey, much to the backlash of the fans back home.

== 1964 Olympics ==
The echoes of the 1960 Olympics defeat could be heard in Tokyo, where the Indian hockey team was not expected to win, at least according to the Indian media that doubted whether the Gold medal could be regained given Pakistan's ascendancy. Managed by Inder Mohan Mahajan, and captained by Charanjit Singh, the Indian team went on to beat Belgium 2–0, in their opening game. India once again met Pakistan in the finals, with India defeating Pakistan 1–0. Shankar was declared Man of the Match for his goalkeeping.

== Retirement ==
After he captained India in the 1966 Asian Games in Bangkok and again beat Pakistan for the gold medal, Lakshman was dropped from the 1968 Mexico Olympics squad, he subsequently announced retirement, in displeasure. India did not do well at the 1968 Mexico Olympics, where India managed a bronze.

== Later life and death ==
After his retirement from hockey, Lakshman served in the Army, and retired in 1979 as an honorary Captain in the Maratha Light Infantry. Towards the end Laxman lived in neediness, he was diagnosed with gangrene. Doctors suggested amputation, but Lakshman preferred naturopathic remedies suggested by his friend, the hockey authorities did not pay any heed to his plea for help and were left on his own. The Madhya Pradesh government, offered assistance to Lakshman £300, towards his treatment which was considered more to be mortification than help, while Lakshman's grandson condemned what he saw as the lack of interest of the Indian Hockey Federation. Lakshman died on 29 April 2006, after his battle with Gangrene. Laxman was cremated at Mhow with full military honours.

== Awards and honours ==
- In 1964, he was awarded India's highest sports honour, the Arjuna award from Sarvepalli Radhakrishnan, the President of India.
- In the 1964 Olympic final against Pakistan, Pakistan's Chef-de-mission Major General Musa said, Give us Joginder and Shankar Lakshman, we will defeat you. It was the ultimate tribute to Shankar.
- In 1967 he was presented with the prestigious Padma Shri award by the President of India Zakir Husain.
- Garrison ground of Mhow has been dedicated to Lakshman, the Infantry School has named it as Honorary Captain Shankar Lakshman Stadium.
- In 1979 Laxman retired as an Honorary Captain in the Maratha Light Infantry.
- During the 1964 Hockey Olympics finals against Pakistan in Tokyo, an Australian Hockey magazine Hockey Circle quoted "'for Lakshman, the ball was the size of a football. It was his afternoon of glory and fame'."
- In 2016, he was posthumously awarded the Major Dhyan Chand Lifetime Achievement Award.

== In popular culture ==
Shankar's name was mentioned in the closing credits of the movie Paan Singh Tomar. It was mentioned in the movie that Lakshman was a four-time Olympic gold medallist, however, this is factually inaccurate, as he was only a two-time Olympic gold medallist.
