= List of Indian field hockey captains in Olympics =

This is a list of all field hockey players who have captained Indian national men's and women's field hockey team at the international level in Olympics. The list includes all Indian captains since the period of 1928 Olympics in Amsterdam.

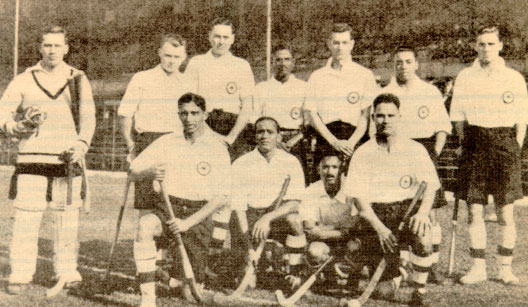
Indian hockey team 1928 Olympics

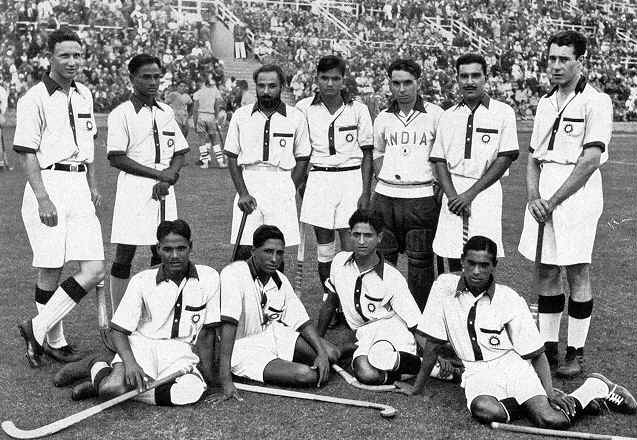
Indian-Hockey-Team-Berlin-1936

== Men's ==
Name	Year	Rank	Venue	Birth	State
Jaipal Singh Munda	1928	Gold medal	Amsterdam Olympics	3 January 1903	Takra Pahantoli, Ranchi, Bengal Presidency (now in Jharkhand)
Lal Shah Bokhari	1932	Gold medal	Los Angeles Olympics	22 July 1909	Faisalabad, Punjab Province (now in Pakistan)
Dhyan Chand	1936	Gold medal	Berlin Olympics	29 August 1905	Allahabad, United Provinces (now Uttar Pradesh)
Kishan Lal	1948	Gold medal	London Olympics	2 February 1917	Mhow, Central Provinces and Berar (now Madhya Pradesh)
K. D. Singh	1952	Gold medal	Helsinki Olympics	2 February 1922	Barabanki, United Provinces (now Uttar Pradesh)
Balbir Singh Sr.	1956	Gold medal	Melbourne Olympics	31 December 1923	Haripur Khalsa, Punjab Province (now Punjab)
Leslie Claudius	1960	Silver medal	Rome Olympics	25 May 1927	Bilaspur, Central Provinces and Berar (now Chhattisgarh)
Charanjit Singh	1964	Gold medal	Tokyo Olympics	3 February 1931	Mairi, Punjab Province (now Himachal Pradesh)
Gurbux Singh and Prithipal Singh	1968	Bronze medal	Mexico City Olympics	11 February 1936; 28 January 1932	Peshawar, North-West Frontier Province (now in Pakistan); Nankana Sahib, Punjab Province (now in Pakistan)
Harmik Singh	1972	Bronze medal	Munich Olympics	10 June 1947	Gujranwala, Punjab Province (now in Pakistan)
Ajit Pal Singh	1976	7th Position	Montreal Olympics	1 April 1947	Sansarpur, Punjab Province (now Punjab)
Vasudevan Baskaran	1980	Gold medal	Moscow Olympics	17 August 1950	Madras, Madras State (now Tamil Nadu)
Zafar Iqbal	1984	5th Position	Los Angeles Olympics	12 June 1956	Aligarh, Uttar Pradesh
M. M. Somaya	1988	6th Position	Seoul Olympics	8 May 1959	Coorg, Karnataka
Pargat Singh	1992	7th Position	Barcelona Olympics	5 March 1965	Mithapur, Jalandhar, Punjab
Pargat Singh	1996	8th Position	Atlanta Olympics	5 March 1965	Mithapur, Jalandhar, Punjab
Ramandeep Singh	2000	7th Position	Sydney Olympics	8 August 1971	Chandigarh
Dilip Tirkey	2004	7th Position	Athens Olympics	25 November 1977	Saunamara, Sundergarh, Orissa (now Odisha)
Bharat Chetri	2012	12th Position	London Olympics	15 December 1981	Kalimpong, West Bengal
P. R. Sreejesh	2016	8th position	Rio Olympics	8 May 1988	Kochi, Kerala
Manpreet Singh	2020	Bronze medal	Tokyo Olympics	26 June 1992	Mithapur, Jalandhar, Punjab
Harmanpreet Singh	2024	Bronze medal	Paris Olympics	6 January 1996	Timmowal, Amritsar, Punjab

== Women's ==
Name	Year	Rank	Venue	Birth	State
Rupa Kumari Saini	1980	4th position	Moscow Olympics	2 September 1954	Faridkot, Punjab
Sushila Chanu Pukhrambam	2016	12th position	Rio Olympics	25 February 1992	Imphal, Manipur
Rani Rampal	2020	4th position	Tokyo Olympics	4 December 1994	Shahabad Markanda, Haryana
