= Field hockey at the 1958 Asian Games =

- Venue: National Stadium
- Location: Tokyo, Japan
- Dates: 25–30 May 1958
- Teams: 5

Medalists
gold medal	Pakistan (1st title)
silver medal	India
bronze medal	South Korea

Field hockey was contested for men only at the 1958 Asian Games in Tokyo, Japan between 25 May and 30 May 1958 with five teams participating in a round robin competition.

After ten matches, Pakistan finished on top of the table with a higher goal difference over India to secure the gold medal. India finished with the silver medal while South Korea got the bronze medal.

== Medalists ==
Event	Gold	Silver	Bronze
Men	Pakistan; Hafeez Ahmed; Noor Alam; Qazi Musarrat Hussain; Khursheed Aslam; Manzoor Bajwa; Naseer Bunda; Munir Dar; Abdul Hamid; Zakir Hussain; Anwar Ahmed Khan; Motiullah Khan; Habib Ali Kiddie; Muhammad Afzal Manna; Chaudhry Ghulam Rasool; Habibur Rehman; Latif-ur-Rehman; Qazi Abdul Waheed; Khwaja Zakauddin	India; A. W. Caleb; N. R. Chavan; Leslie Claudius; Chinadorai Deshmutu; Balbir Singh Dosanjh; Gurjit Singh Kullar; Shankar Lakshman; Mohammed Yakub Qureshi; D. P. Rathi; Bakshish Singh; Balbir Singh Jr. Balkrishan Singh; Gurdev Singh; Gursevak Singh; Jagjit Singh; Udham Singh	South Korea; Ahn Jae-sung; Baek Ki-young; Bu Dae-hyun; Hong In-ho; Kim Chu-gil; Kim Jae-eui; Kim Sang-jong; Kim Sang-taek; Kim Si-sup; Kim Soo-il; Kim Yeon-bong; Kwon Oh-wan; Lee Gul; Lee Jung-soo; Park Chun-saeng; Park Sang-ho; Yang Geum-dong

== Results ==
=== Standings ===
Pos	Team	Pld	W	D	L	GF	GA	GD	Pts
1st place, gold medalist(s)	Pakistan	4	3	1	0	19	0	+19	7
2nd place, silver medalist(s)	India	4	3	1	0	16	1	+15	7
3rd place, bronze medalist(s)	South Korea	4	2	0	2	6	13	−7	4
4	Malaya	4	0	1	3	2	15	−13	1
5	Japan (H)	4	0	1	3	1	15	−14	1

(H) Hosts

=== Matches ===
25 May 1958

Malaya	2–3	South Korea

25 May 1958

India	8–0	Japan

26 May 1958

Pakistan	5–0	Japan

26 May 1958

India	2–1	South Korea

27 May 1958

Pakistan	8–0	South Korea
Dar ?', ?', ?', ?', ?'; Afzal; Bunda; Hamid	Report

27 May 1958

India	6–0	Malaya
Balb. Singh Sr. 1', 6', 67'; Balb. Singh Jr. 4'; Chavan 61'; Gurd. Singh 66'	Report

28 May 1958

Japan	1–2	South Korea

28 May 1958

Pakistan	6–0	Malaya

30 May 1958

Japan	0–0	Malaya
	Report

30 May 1958

India	0–0	Pakistan
	Report
