= Balbir Singh Jr. =

Indian field hockey player (1932–2021)

Personal information
- Full name: Balbir Singh Kular
- Nationality: India
- Born: 2 May 1932 Sansarpur, Punjab Province, British India (present-day Sansarpur, Punjab, India)
- Died: 11 April 2021 (aged 88) Chandigarh, Chandigarh, India
- Military career
- Allegiance: India
- Branch: Indian Army
- Service years: 1962-1984
- Rank: Major

Sport
- Sport: Field hockey
- Event: Men's team
Medal record
Men's field hockey
Representing India
Asian Games
Silver medal – second place	1958 Tokyo	Team

Balbir Singh Kular (2 May 1932 – 11 April 2021), predominantly known as Balbir Singh Jr., was an Indian field hockey player. He studied at Lyallpur Khalsa College and DAV College. He started his hockey career for Panjab University and later represented Railways and Services in the Indian Senior National Hockey Championship. He played for the Indian team that won the silver medal at the 1958 Asian Games alongside his namesake Balbir Singh Sr. He joined the Indian Army as an emergency commissioned officer in 1962 and retired in 1984 with the rank of major.
