= India national field hockey team =

India national field hockey team may refer to:

- India men's national field hockey team
- India women's national field hockey team
