= Charanjit Singh (field hockey) =

Indian field hockey player (1931–2022)

Personal information
- Born: 3 February 1931 Mairi Village, Punjab, British India
- Died: 27 January 2022 (aged 90) Una, Himachal Pradesh, India
Medal record
Representing India
Men's Field hockey
Olympic Games
Gold medal – first place	1964 Tokyo	Team
Silver medal – second place	1960 Rome	Team
Asian Games
Silver medal – second place	1962 Jakarta	Team

Charanjit Singh (3 February 1931 (Note: There is some confusion with Singh's date of birth. Most sources indicate Singh was born on 3 February 1931. However, the Indian newspaper Hindustan Times references Singh's date of birth in an obituary as 20 November 1929.) – 27 January 2022) was an Indian field hockey player who was the captain of the team that won the gold medal at the 1964 Summer Olympics in Tokyo. He was also a member of the team that won the silver medal at the 1960 Summer Olympics in Rome and the 1962 Asian Games in Jakarta.

Singh was a recipient of the Indian government's Arjuna Award in 1963 and the Padma Shri, India's fourth highest civilian honor, in 1964.

== Early life ==
Singh was born on 3 February 1931 in Mairi Village in the Amb subdivision of Una district in present day Himachal Pradesh (then Punjab, British Raj). Charanjit Singh was an alumnus of Col. Brown Cambridge School, Dehradun and was exposed to hockey during his time there. Singh graduated with a Bachelor of Science degree from the Government Agricultural College, Lyallpur (in modern-day Pakistan). During this time, he represented Panjab University.

== Career ==
Singh started his career representing Punjab Police and was picked for the Indian team in the early 1950s, playing as a midfielder (also referred to as center-half) in a team that included Leslie Claudius, Keshav Dutt, and Joseph Antic, all playing in the midfield position.

Singh was the captain of the Indian hockey team that won the gold medal at the 1964 Summer Olympics in Tokyo. He was also a member of the team that won the silver medal at the Field hockey at the 1960 Summer Olympics in Rome. He also represented India in two Asian Games, including the 1962 Asian Games in Jakarta. He is credited with returning the gold medal to the Indian team in 1964, when earlier in both the 1962 Asian games and in the 1960 Olympics, the country had lost in the finals to Pakistan. Singh had missed the final against Pakistan due to an injury. In 1964, under Singh's captaincy, the Indian team won a few tournaments leading up to the Olympics, and remained unbeaten in the Olympics, winning seven matches and drawing two, before defeating Australia 3-1 in the semifinals, and Pakistan, 1-0 in the finals. In an editorial, the Indian newspaper, The Indian Express, called Singh's style of play "crafty" and him a "member of the golden generation", referring to him and some of his peers including Balbir Singh Dosanjh, Keshav Dutt, and Balbir Singh Junior. The newspaper went on to note that he would be "remembered as one of the key men responsible for India regaining its supremacy on the hockey field".

He was a recipient of the Arjuna Award in 1963 and the Padma Shri, India's fourth highest civilian honor, in 1964.

After his retirement from the sport, he served as the dean of student welfare at Punjab Agricultural University and later at the Hisar Agricultural University, before going on to become the director of sports at Himachal Pradesh University.

== Personal life ==
Singh was married and had two sons and a daughter. Singh died from a heart attack at his home in Una, Himachal Pradesh, on 27 January 2022, seven days before his 91st birthday. He had suffered a paralytic attack five years before his death. His wife had predeceased him 12 years earlier.

== See also ==
- Field hockey in India
- List of Indian hockey captains in Olympics
