= Balbir Singh Pama =

Balbir Singh Pama served as the Chief of Staff of the Northern Command in the Indian Army from 2011 to 2013. He also served as the Additional Director General of Perspective Planning, a think tank of the Indian Army, and Director General of Recruitment, among many other executive posts, and was awarded the highest award for Indian meritorious service, the Param Vashisht Seva medal (PVSM), in 2014.

Lieutenant General Pama is currently the Worldwide Operations Director of Praemium ACE Foods. He brings over 40 years of combined experience in operations, strategy, communication, logistics and civil administration management in national and international environments. He is a strong supporter of ACE Global Leaders of Excellence Network, which is a diverse platform of ACE Health Foundation, a 501(c)(3) non-profit organization, for connecting highly accomplished and successful leaders globally committed to international leadership development, grounded in the premise that focused sharing of knowledge, expertise, and resources increases the probability of productive and powerful outcomes.

An alumnus of the National Defense College, Pama is also a prolific writer. His book, Paradigm Shift of Training in the Army: Including Joint Training is part of the syllabus at the Indian military training institutes.

== Personal life ==
Pama hails from Punjab state. Lt General Pama and his wife Suchita have two daughters, Kaanan Pama and Akanksha Pama.
