= Sansarpur =

- Village
- Location in Punjab, India Sansarpur (India)
- Coordinates: 31.2707°N 75.6052°E
- Country: India
- State: Punjab
- District: Jalandhar

Government
  - Type: Municipal corporation

Population (2011)
  - Total: 4,657

Languages
  - Official: Punjabi
- Time zone: UTC+5:30 (IST)

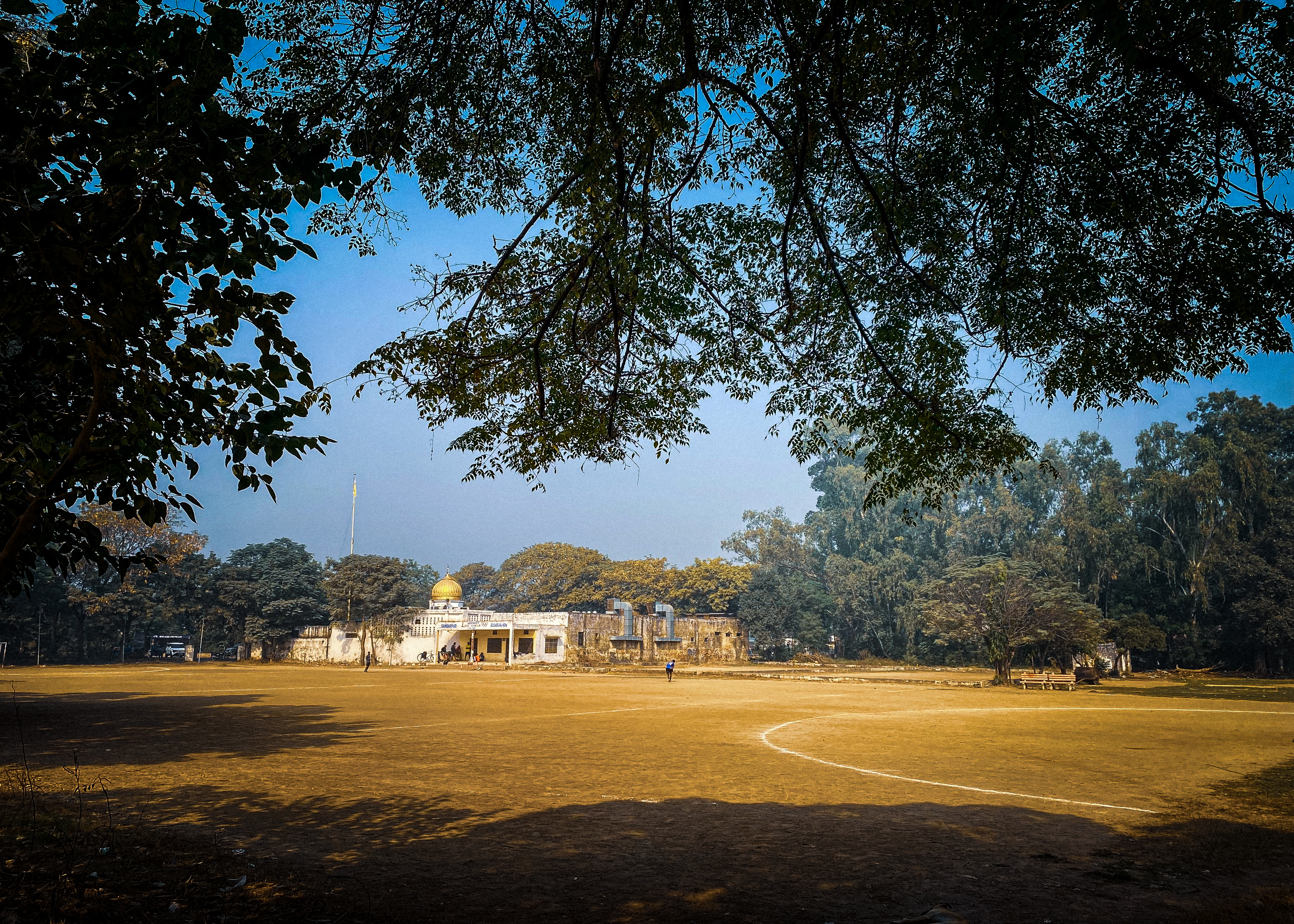
Old Hockey Ground, Sansarpur

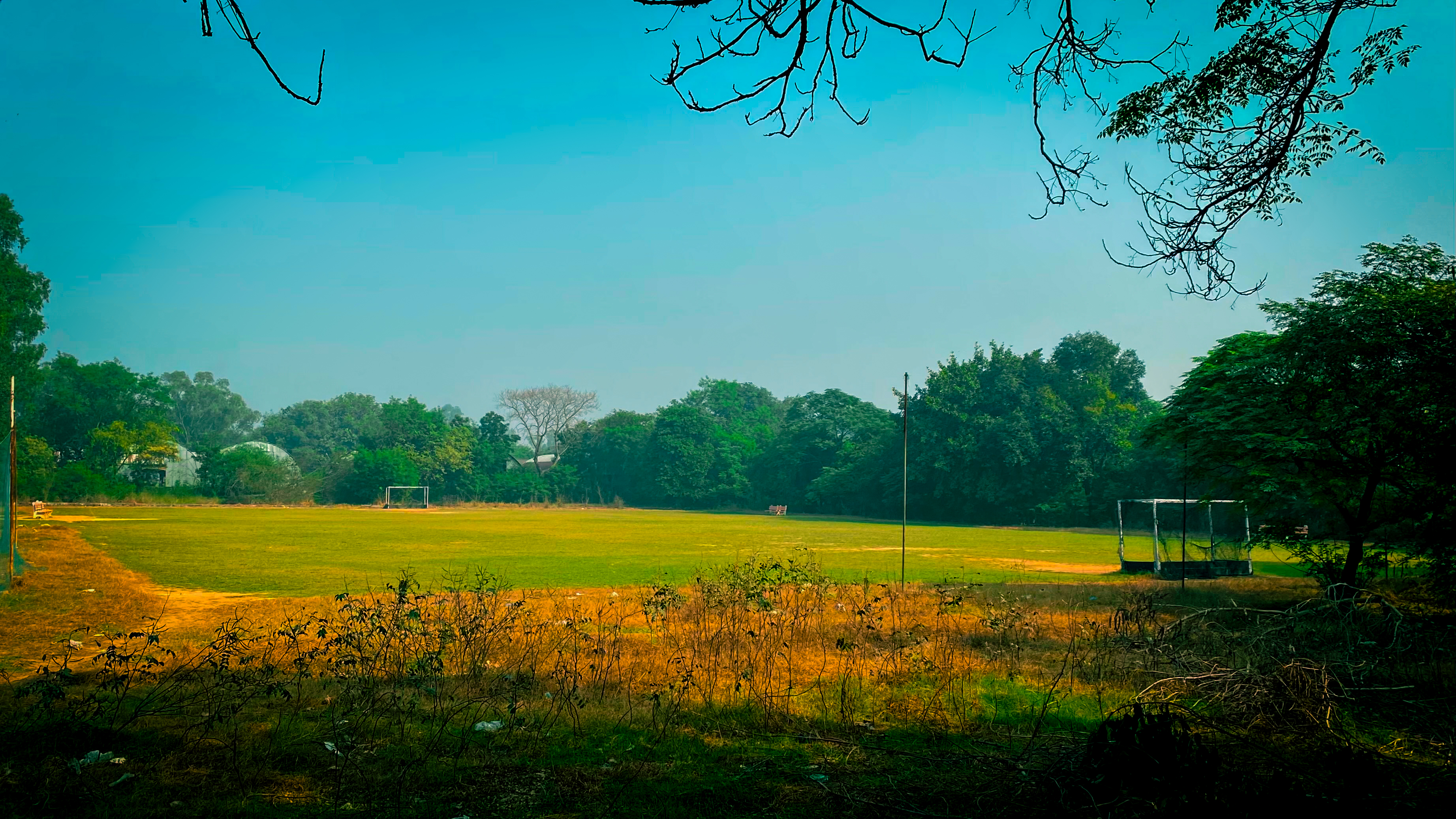
New Hockey Ground, Sansarpur

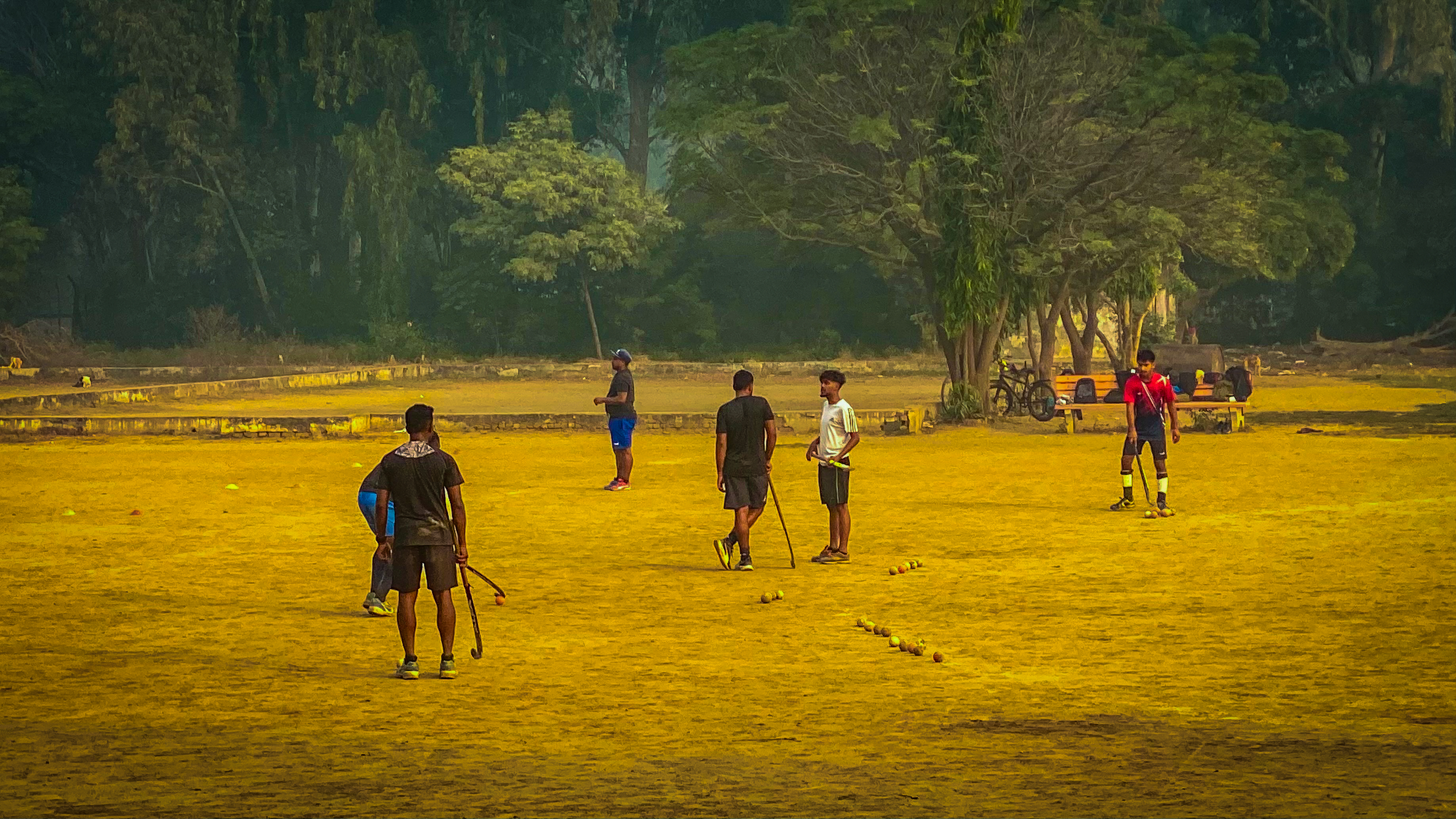
Old Hockey Ground, Sansarpur

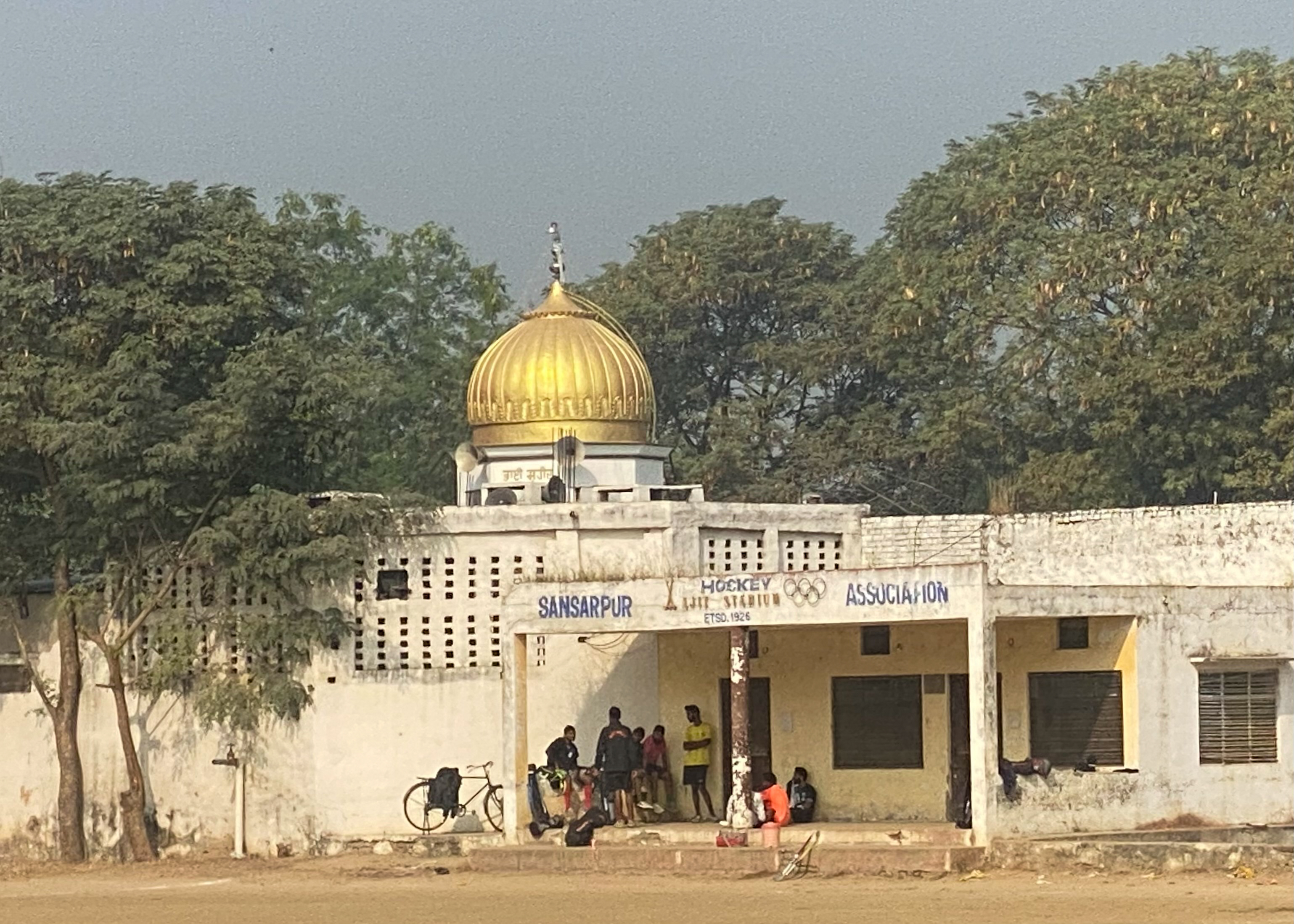
Sansar Hockey Association Estd.1926

Sansarpur is a village in Jalandhar district in the Indian state of Punjab.

== Demographics ==
As of 2001 India census, Sansarpur had a population of 4061. Males constitute 51% of the population and females 49%. Sansarpur has an average literacy rate of 75%, higher than the national average of 59.5%: male literacy is 79%, and female literacy is 71%. In Sansarpur, 11% of the population is under 6 years of age.

== Sports ==
Among all the Indian villages, Sansarpur has produced the largest number of Olympians for the country. The village in its heyday produced 14 Hockey Olympic players, who represented India, Kenya and Canada at the Olympics. In one particular Olympics, 7 players from Sansarpur represented their respective countries. 5 from India and 2 from Kenya. In present-day Sansarpur though due to the lack of support from the Indian government and lack of facilities like astro turf, the standard of Hockey players emerging from this village is falling.

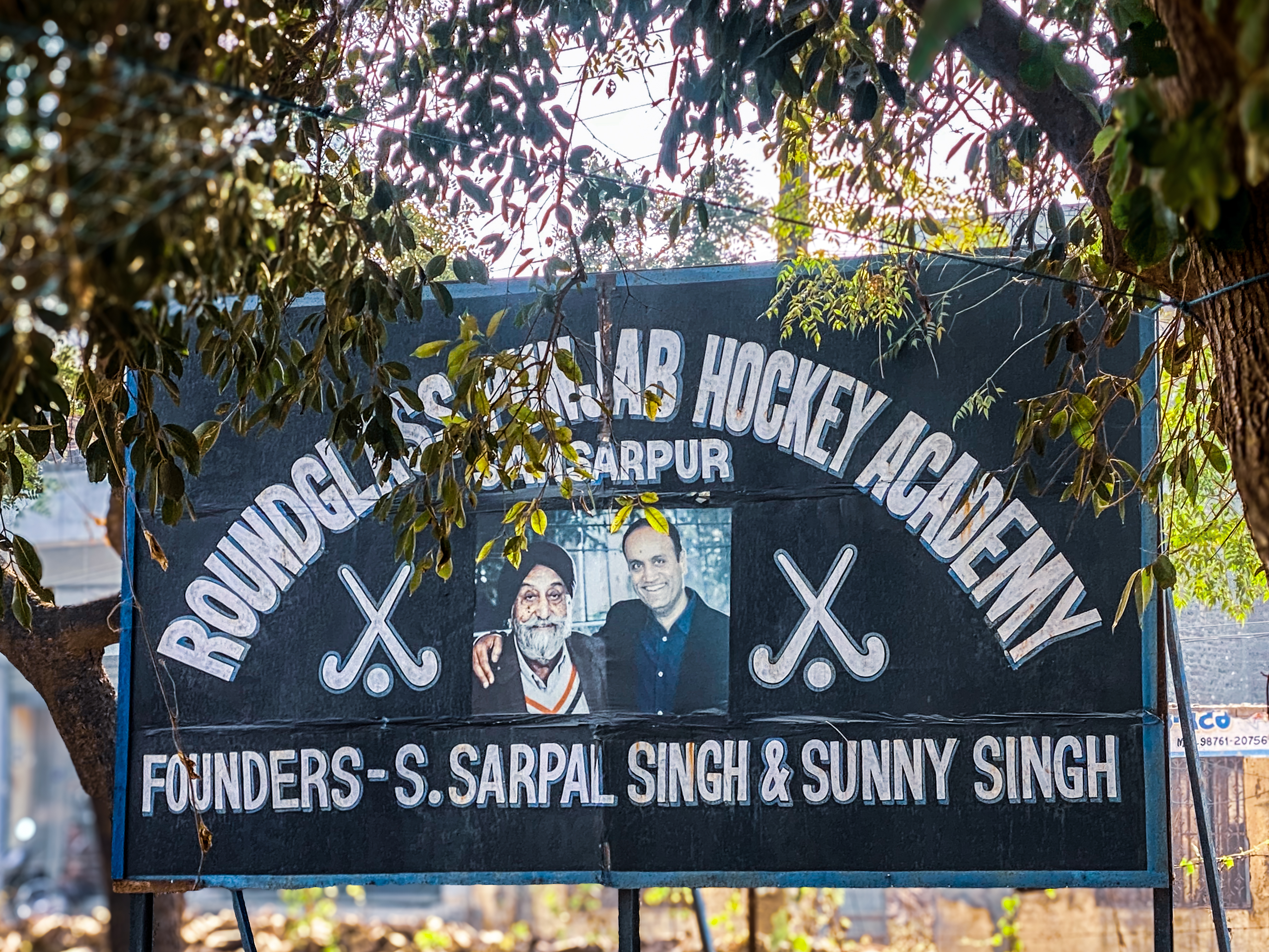

== Notable people ==
The village has given more than 306 international and national level hockey players to India out of which more than 200 belong to one family of the village. Several of the India's notable field hockey players who hail from or trace their family origins from Sansarpur are:

=== India ===
- Thakur Singh Kular, (India tour of New Zealand 1926)
- Gurmit Singh Kullar, Olympian (1932)
- Udham Singh Kular, Olympian (1952, 1956, 1960, 1964)
- Gurdev Singh Kular, Olympian (1956)
- Gurjit Singh Kullar, (1958 Asian Games)
- Balbir Singh Kular Jr, (1958 Asian Games)
- Darshan Singh Kular, Olympian (1964)
- Balbir Singh Kullar, Olympian (1964, 1968)
- Jagjit Singh Kular, Olympian (1964, 1968)
- Balbir Singh Kular, Olympian (1968)
- Tarsem Singh Kular, Olympian (1968)
- Ajit Pal Singh Kular, Olympian (1968, 1972, 1976)
- Ravipal Singh, (2010 Asian Games)
- Jasjit Singh Kular, (2014 World Cup)

=== Kenya ===
- Hardev Singh Kular, Olympian (1956, 1960)
- Hardial Singh Kular, Olympian (1968)
- Jagjeet Singh Kular, Olympian (1968, 1972)
- Harvinder Singh Kular, Olympian (1984)

=== Canada ===
- Pritpal Singh Kullar, (1978)
- Bindi Kullar, Olympian (2000, 2008)
