= Indian women at the Olympics =

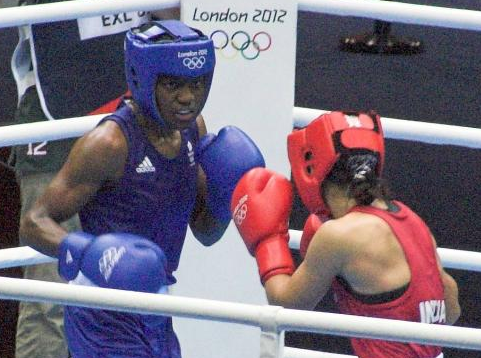
Mary Kom (in red) vs Nicola Adams at the London 2012 Summer Olympics

Several Indian women have participated in the Olympics over the years. Eight women from India have won an Olympic medal so far. They are Karnam Malleswari, Mary Kom, Saina Nehwal, P. V. Sindhu (twice), Sakshi Malik, Mirabai Chanu, Lovlina Borgohain and Manu Bhaker (also twice).

The first Indian woman to ever win an Olympic medal was Karnam Malleswari, who won a bronze medal at the 2000 Sydney Olympics in the Women's 69 kg category in Weightlifting.

In the 2012 London Olympics, women's boxing was featured as a sport for the first time. India was represented by five-time world champion Mary Kom who was the only Indian to qualify for the event. However, she lost to Nicola Adams of the UK in the semi-final. She thus earned herself an Olympic bronze medal. Saina Nehwal became the first Indian to win a medal in Badminton at the Olympics, by winning the bronze medal at the London Olympics 2012 on 4 August 2012. Geeta Phogat became the first ever Indian woman to qualify for the women's 55 kg wrestling in the London Olympics 2012. Women's wrestling was announced in 2004.

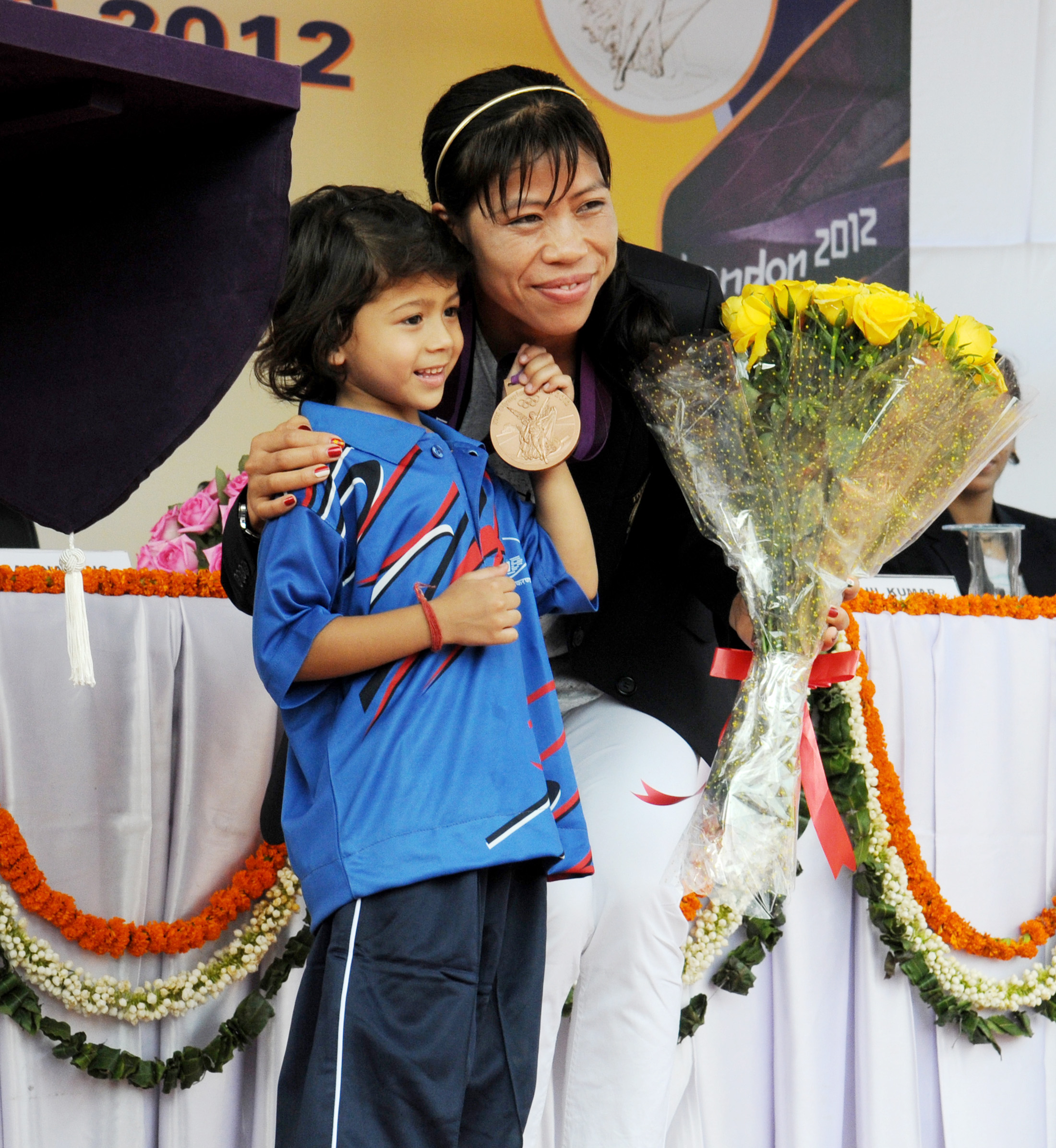
Olympics bronze medalist Mary Kom with young sportsperson

At the 2016 Rio Olympics, P. V. Sindhu became the first ever Indian woman to win a silver medal at the Olympics. She reached the Women's singles badminton final, which she lost to Carolina Marín of Spain on 19 August 2016. She also became the youngest Indian to win an Olympic medal. At the same Olympics, Sakshi Malik became the first Indian woman to win a medal in Wrestling. She won the bronze medal in Women's 58 kg freestyle wrestling. This was the first Olympics for India where all the medallists (2) were women.

P. V. Sindhu, Mirabai Chanu and Lovlina Borgohain made India proud by winning medals at the 2020 Tokyo Olympics. Mirabai Chanu won the silver medal on the very first day of the Tokyo Olympics 2020, where she achieved the second position after the total count of both Snatch and Clean & Jerk. Her highest lift at Snatch was 87 kg and at Clean & Jerk, she was able to lift 115 kg, making her overall score 202 kg. P. V. Sindhu became the first Indian woman to win two Olympic medals. Following up on her silver medal in Rio 2016, she secured the bronze medal in Tokyo 2020 by defeating China's He Bingjiao 21–13, 21–15 in two straight games. Lovlina Borgohain won her first Olympic medal in Women's welterweight boxing, where she assured herself a medal after she defeated Taiwan's Chen Nien-Chin in the quarterfinals. However, in the semifinals, she lost to Busenaz Sürmeneli of Turkey, earning herself the bronze medal.

Manu Bhaker became the first Indian athlete ever to bag more than one medal at a single edition of the Olympic Games, winning 2 bronzes in the Women's 10m Air Pistol & the Mixed 10 metre air pistol team event, which she won alongside Sarabjot Singh.

== List of medalists ==
Medal	Name/Team	Games	Sport	Event	Date
(bronze) Bronze	Karnam Malleswari	2000 Sydney	Weightlifting	Women's 69 kg	19 September 2000
(bronze) Bronze	Saina Nehwal	2012 London	Badminton	Women's singles	4 August 2012
(bronze) Bronze	Mary Kom	2012 London	Boxing	Women's flyweight	8 August 2012
(silver) Silver	P. V. Sindhu	2016 Rio de Janeiro	Badminton	Women's singles	19 August 2016
(bronze) Bronze	Sakshi Malik	2016 Rio de Janeiro	Wrestling	Women's freestyle 58 kg	17 August 2016
(silver) Silver	Mirabai Chanu	2020 Tokyo	Weightlifting	Women's 49 kg	24 July 2021
(bronze) Bronze	P. V. Sindhu	2020 Tokyo	Badminton	Women's singles	1 August 2021
(bronze) Bronze	Lovlina Borgohain	2020 Tokyo	Boxing	Women's welterweight	4 August 2021
(bronze) Bronze	Manu Bhaker	2024 Paris	Shooting	Women's 10m air Pistol	28 July 2024
(bronze) Bronze	Manu Bhaker	2024 Paris	Shooting	Mixed 10 metre air pistol team	30 July 2024
