= Zafar Iqbal (field hockey) =

Indian field hockey player

Personal information
- Born: 12 June 1956 (age 70) Hargawan, Bihar Sharif, Bihar, India

Sport
- Sport: Field hockey
- Position: Halfback
National team
Years	Team	Caps	Goals
1977–19??	India		-
Medal record
Men's field hockey
Representing India
Olympic Games
Gold medal – first place	1980 Moscow	Team
Asian Games
Silver medal – second place	1978 Bangkok	Team
Silver medal – second place	1982 Delhi	Team
Champions Trophy
Bronze medal – third place	1982 Amstelveen

Zafar Iqbal (born 12 June 1956) is a former Indian field hockey player and captain of the India national team.

== Early life ==
Zafar Iqbal was born on 12 June 1956 to Mohammed Shahabuddin Ahmed, a professor in the Aligarh Muslim University (AMU), and Najmun Nisa, as the third of their five children.

He was born in Hargawan, a village in Bihar Sharif, in the Indian State of Bihar. His family moved to Aligarh, Uttar Pradesh where he was brought up. Iqbal started out playing football as a child, before taking to hockey in 1969–70 encouraged by his father's colleague and hockey enthusiast, Professor Khan. He was mentored by Swami Jagan Nath, hockey coach of the AMU at the time and manager of the India national team during the 1936 Berlin Olympics. Alongside hockey, Iqbal pursued a degree in civil engineering from AMU, graduating in 1978 with 74 percent marks.

== Professional career ==
Iqbal was selected for the combined university trials after being selected on back of good performances during the inter-university games; Zafar playing for AMU. Iqbal good performances against the India national team which included scoring a goal against Leslie Fernandez prompted his selection to the national team for its tour of Netherlands in 1977. Iqbal till that point had always played in the left-in position, but was asked by coach Kishan Lal to play left-out because Surinder Singh Sodhi played in the former.

Iqbal played at the Asian Games in 1978 at Bangkok and was the captain of the team at New Delhi in 1982, winning the silver medal in both. The peak of his career in hockey came in 1980 when he represented India at the Moscow Olympics where India won the gold medal.

He carried the Indian Tricolour at the opening ceremony of the Los Angeles Olympics 1984.

He also won the bronze medal for the country at the Champion's Trophy 1982 in Holland.

After retiring from playing he became the Chief National Coach, Head Coach and National Selector for the Indian hockey squad. The team coached by him won the silver medal at the Asian Games in Hiroshima in 1994.

== Achievements ==
India conferred Zafar Iqbal with the highest honour for a sportsman, the “Arjuna Award” in 1983.

The U. P. Government gave him the highest citizen award of the state, “Yash Bharti” in 1994.

In 2012, the President of India honoured him with the “Padma Shri” for his services, and in the same year he was felicitated at the ‘Golden Greats’ platform by Hockey India along with 34 other Olympic Gold Medalists.

In recognition of his services to the nation, Aligarh Nagar Nigam named a road after him and in 2013, in honour of his commitment to the revival of hockey at AMU, the university presented him with the D.Litt. Honoris Causa at its 60th Annual Convocation.

== See also ==
- List of Indian hockey captains in Olympics
- Field hockey in India

Olympic Games
Preceded by D. N. Devine Jones	Flagbearer for India; Los Angeles 1984	Succeeded by Kartar Singh
