= Chinadorai Deshmutu =

Indian field hockey player

Personal information
- Full name: Chinadorai Deshmutu
- Born: 26 October 1932

Sport
- Sport: Field hockey
Medal record
Men's Field Hockey
Representing India
Olympic Games
| Gold medal – first place | 1952 Helsinki | Team |
Asian Games
| Silver medal – second place | 1958 Tokyo | Team |

Chinadorai Deshmutu (born October 26, 1932, date of death unknown) was an Indian hockey player who competed in the 1952 Summer Olympics. He was a member of the Indian field hockey team, which won the gold medal. He played one match as goalkeeper.
