= Jagjit Singh (field hockey) =

Indian field hockey player

Medal record

Men's field hockey

Representing India

Olympic Games
Gold medal – first place	1964 Tokyo	Team competition
Bronze medal – third place	1968 Mexico	Team competition

Asian Games
Gold medal – first place	1966 Bangkok	Team competition

Jagjit Singh Kular (1 January 1944 – 16 November 2010) was a field hockey player from India. He competed at the 1964 Summer Olympics, the 1966 Asian Games, and the 1968 Summer Olympics.
