= Balkrishan Singh =

Indian field hockey player (1933–2004)

Personal information
- Born: 10 March 1933 Patiala, Punjab, India
- Died: 31 December 2004 (aged 71) Patiala, Punjab, India

Sport
- Sport: Field hockey
Medal record
Men's field hockey
Representing India
Olympic Games
Gold medal – first place	1956 Melbourne	Team
Asian Games
Silver medal – second place	1958 Tokyo	Team

Balkrishan Singh (10 March 1933 – 31 December 2004) was a field hockey player from India who won the gold medal at the 1956 Summer Olympics. He was born in Dolon Khurd.

Balkrishan Singh is the only player in the country to have won the gold medal both as a player and as a coach. Besides being a member of the gold medal-winning team at the 1956 Olympics, he was chief coach of the team that won the gold in the 1980 Moscow Olympics.

Singh went to Australia in 1965 to train the women's national squad. Australian Prime Minister Malcolm Fraser stated that he went on record praising Singh's coaching abilities.

He was the first coach to experiment with the concept of total hockey in India. He first put this concept into use during the 1992 Barcelona Olympics. Total hockey, in his view, was hockey that should be played like basketball – attack together and defend together.

He is hockey's first-ever player-coach. With 2 Olympic medals (gold in 1956 and silver in 1960), he is the lone Olympian to coach four Olympic teams.

Singh made his international debut in the Hockey Festival at Warsaw, Poland, in 1955.

At the Melbourne Olympics, the defender played all matches except the Pakistan final. So enamoured were the Australians by his tactics that he almost emerged a cult figure in later years.

Two years later, his ambition of playing against Pakistan was fulfilled at the Tokyo Asian Games. The match ended in a goalless draw, thanks to Singh, though Pakistan was declared the winner on the basis of goal average. At the 1960 Rome Olympics, Pakistan also became the champion.

Inspired by the personality of the chief coach Dhyan Chand, Singh joined a coaching course at NIS, Patiala, and topped it with 93 percent marks. He spent the rest of his life innovating hockey.

In 1967, Singh spent about five months in Australia, imparting hockey knowledge. Prime Minister of Australia, Malcolm Fraser, a hockey umpire, praised Singh's services when he met his counterpart Morarji Desai later.

At 35, Singh coached the 1968 Mexico Olympic team for a bronze medal. His boys won the gold at the Moscow Olympics. He was recalled for the next Olympics only after India fared poorly in the Bombay World Cup and in the Delhi Asian Games in between. Meanwhile, he put together a girls' team for the Delhi Asian Games, which they won.

In the run-up to the 1992 Barcelona Olympics, his team set up a tremendous record, but the team's lack of discipline spoilt victory.

But his efforts in giving India a meaningful coaching perspective cannot be denied. Had he ever been given a four-year tenure, the history of Indian hockey would not have been as discouraging as it is now.

Based on his research, Singh proposed the abolition of penalty corners and the striking circle in order to make the game simple. He welcomed the introduction of artificial playing surfaces. He was the first Indian coach to adopt the 4-4-2-1 style. Singh metamorphosed the unique Indian traits in the concept of total hockey, which earned him many laurels in the 80s.
