= Balbir Singh Kular =

Indian field hockey player (born 1945)

Colonel Balbir Singh Kular VSM
Personal information
- Nickname: Balbir Singh (Services)
- Nationality: Indian
- Born: 5 April 1945 (age 81) Sansarpur
- Education: Cant. Board School, Jalandhar
- Occupation: Indian Army Officer (Colonel)
- Military career
- Allegiance: India
- Branch: Indian Army
- Rank: Colonel
- Awards: Vishisht Seva Medal

Sport
- Country: India
- Sport: Field hockey
- Event: Men's team
- Team: India (International); Services (National); Punjab State (National)
- Retired: 1970s
- Also served as a coach, manager and selector for the Indian national hockey team
Medal record
Men's field hockey
Representing India
Summer Olympics
Bronze medal – third place	1968 Mexico City	Team
Asian Games
Gold medal – first place	1966 Bangkok	Team
- Updated on 9 June 2012

Colonel Balbir Singh Kular, VSM (born 5 April 1945) is an Indian field hockey player (half-back). His surname is also spelled as Kullar or Khullar.

Balbir Singh was born in the Sansarpur village of the Jalandhar district, and later settled in the Jalandhar city. As part of the Indian Universities Hockey Team, he played in Afghanistan in 1962. In 1964, he represented the Punjab state in the National Hockey Championship at Delhi.

In 1965, Balbir Singh joined the Indian Army and later, rose to the rank of Colonel. As a member of the national hockey team, he toured Europe (1966–1968), Japan (1966), Kenya (1967) and Uganda (1968).

Balbir Singh was part of the India hockey teams that won the Asian Games Gold in 1966 and the Olympic Bronze in 1968. He scored three goals in the 1968 Olympics.

During 1965–1974, Balbir Singh represented the Services team in the National Hockey Championship of India. He was the captain of the Services team that won the Bombay Gold Cup in 1971.

Balbir Singh retired from active play in the 1970s due to knee problems. He coached the ASC hockey team during 1970–1980. He then coached the Central Zone team (1981), the Indian men's hockey team (1982) and the women's hockey team (1995–98). With him as the coach in 1982, the Indian men's team won Bronze at the Champions Trophy in Amsterdam, Silver at the Asian Games in Delhi and Silver at the 1982 Esanda World Hockey Championship in Melbourne. He also served as a selector for the Indian national hockey team from March 1987 to July 1987, and as its manager for during the Indo-Pan American Hockey Championship (Chandigarh) in 1995.

Balbir Singh later served as the president of Sansarpur Hockey Association. His autobiography Sansarpur to London Olympics was launched by the Indian Army General V K Singh in 2012. His son is Col Sarfraz Singh, a skilled mountaineer who scaled Mount Everest in 2018.His brother-in-law was Col RPS Gill, the youngest officer in his time to receive VSM as a young captain.

== Awards and recognition ==
- Vishisht Seva Medal
- Arjuna Award (1968); as "Cadet Balbir Singh"
- Chief of Army Staff Commendation Card
- Lifetime Achievement award (1999)

Balbir Singh was one of the four players to be featured on the special commemorative stamp released on 31 December 1966 by India Post, as a tribute to the Gold medal win at the 1966 Asian Games; the other three were Vinood Kumar, John Victor Peter and Mukhbain Singh.
