= Balbir Singh Kullar =

Indian field hockey player (1942–2020)

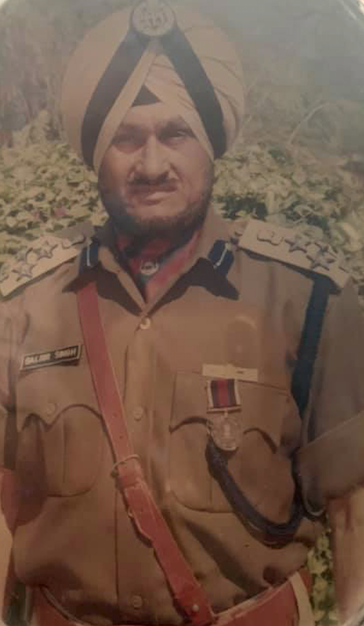
- Picture of Retired D.I.G. Balbir Singh Kullar taken in 2001

Personal information
- Nationality: India
- Born: 8 August 1942 Sansarpur, Punjab Province, British India (present-day Sansarpur, Punjab, India)
- Died: 28 February 2020 (age 77) Sansarpur, Punjab, India
- Education: DAV College, Jalandhar
- Employer: Punjab Police (retired as DIG in 2001)

Sport
- Sport: Field hockey
- Event: Men's team
- Team: India (International); Railways (National); Punjab State (National); Punjab Police (National); All India Police (National)
Medal record
Men's field hockey
Representing India
Olympic Games
| Gold medal – first place | 1964 Tokyo | Team |
| Bronze medal – third place | 1968 Mexico City | Team |
Asian Games
| Gold medal – first place | 1966 Bangkok | Team |
- Updated on 9 June 2012

Sardar Balbir Singh Kullar (8 August 1942 – 28 February 2020) was an Indian field hockey player and a Punjab Police officer. Alternative spellings of his last name include Khullar.

Balbir Singh was born in the Sansarpur village of the Jalandhar district. He was the captain of the All India Schools during 1957–1960, and also played as part of the Combined University Team. At the national-level, he represented the hockey teams of Punjab State, Indian Railways and Punjab Police. For a brief time, he also played for the little-known hockey team of Mohun Bagan. Balbir Singh joined the Punjab Armed Police in 1962, and became an Assistant Sub-Inspector of the Punjab Police in 1963.

As part of the Indian national men's hockey team, he played his first international game in 1963 at Lyon in France. He gained reputation as an inside forward in the Indian team, and toured Belgium, East Africa, East Germany, England, the Netherlands, Italy, Kenya, New Zealand and West Germany. He was a member of the Indian team that won the Olympic Gold in 1964 (Tokyo), Asian Games Gold in 1966 (Bangkok) and the Olympic Bronze in 1968 (Mexico).

During 1968–1975, Balbir Singh was a part of the All India Police team, and also served as its captain for some time. He became the Deputy Superintendent of Police in 1981, became an Indian Police Service officer in 1987. He retired as a Deputy Inspector General (DIG) in February 2001.

He died at his home in Sansarpur at the age of 77.

== Awards ==
- Padma Shri (2009)
- Arjuna Award (1999)
