= Joginder Singh (field hockey) =

Indian field hockey player

Medal record

Representing India

Men's Field hockey

Olympic Games
Silver medal – second place	1960 Rome	Team
Gold medal – first place	1964 Tokyo	Team

Asian Games
Silver medal – second place	1962 Jakarta	Team

Joginder Singh (3 August 1939 – 6 November 2002), nicknamed "Gindi", was an Indian hockey player.

== Career ==
Playing in the right-wing position, he won the silver medal with his team at the 1960 Summer Olympics in Rome and the 1962 Asian Games in Jakarta, and then the gold medal at the 1964 Summer Olympics in Tokyo. He was born in Delhi.

After retiring, he settled in Kolkata, where he worked as a sports officer for the Bengal Nagpur Railway (BNR), which was later renamed the South Eastern Railway (SER).

He died at age 63 after a protracted kidney illness.
