= Gurdev Singh (field hockey) =

Indian field hockey player (1933–2024)

Personal information
- Full name: Gurdev Singh Kular
- Born: 12 August 1933 Sansarpur, Punjab, British India
- Died: 8 February 2024 (aged 90) Leeds, England

Sport
- Sport: Field hockey
Medal record
Men's field hockey
Olympic Games
Representing India
Gold medal – first place	1956 Melbourne	Team
Asian Games
Silver medal – second place	1958 Tokyo	Team
Silver medal – second place	1962 Jakarta	Team

Gurdev Singh Kular (12 August 1933 – 8 February 2024) was an Indian field hockey player, originally from Sansarpur. He was part of the Indian field hockey team at the 1956 Summer Olympics in Melbourne, which won the gold medal. He was also a member of the field hockey team for the 1958 Tokyo and 1962 Jakarta Asian Games, captaining the team in the latter competition. He was also the captain of the gold-medallist Punjab team in the national hockey championship in Bhopal same year. In 1964, he led a team tour to Afghanistan as captain. Singh died in Leeds, England on 8 February 2024, at the age of 90.
