= Govind Perumal =

Indian field hockey player (1925–2002)

Personal information
- Born: September 25, 1925
- Died: September 17, 2002 (aged 76) Nala Sopara, Thane, Maharashtra, India

Sport
- Sport: Field hockey
Medal record
Men's field hockey
Olympic Games
Representing India
Gold medal – first place	1952 Helsinki	Team competition
Gold medal – first place	1956 Melbourne	Team competition

Govind Perumal (September 25, 1925 – September 17, 2002 in Nala Sopara) was an Indian field hockey player who won two gold medals with the Indian team at the 1952 and 1956 Summer Olympics.
