= Amir Kumar =

Indian field hockey player (1923–1980)

Personal information
- Full name: Amir Chand Kumar
- Born: August 10, 1923 Lahore, British India
- Died: January 25, 1980 (aged 56) Lucknow, Uttar Pradesh, India

Sport
- Sport: Field hockey
Medal record
Men's field hockey
Olympic Games
Representing India
Gold medal – first place	1948 London	Team competition
Gold medal – first place	1956 Melbourne	Team competition

Amir Chand Kumar (August 10, 1923 – January 25, 1980) was an Indian field hockey player who won a gold medal each at the 1948 and 1956 Summer Olympics.
