= Bakshish Singh =

Indian field hockey player (1928–1970)

Personal information
- Full name: Bakshish Singh Sandhu
- Born: 14 June 1928 Lyallpur, Punjab, British India now Faisalabad, Punjab, Pakistan
- Died: 21 September 1970 (aged 42) Amritsar, Punjab, India

Sport
- Sport: Field hockey
Medal record
Men's field hockey
Olympic Games
Representing India
Gold medal – first place	1956 Melbourne	Team
Asian Games
Silver medal – second place	1958 Tokyo	Team

Bakshish Singh (14 June 1928 – 21 September 1970) was an Indian field hockey player who won the gold medal at the 1956 Summer Olympics. He studied at Khalsa College, Amritsar and served in the Punjab Police from 1948 to 1961. He was also part of the team that won the silver medal in the 1958 Asian Games.
