= Udham Singh (field hockey) =

Indian field hockey player

Personal information
- Full name: Udham Singh Kular
- Born: 4 August 1928 Sansarpur, Jalandhar, Punjab, British India
- Died: 23 March 2000 (aged 71) Sansarpur, Jalandhar, Punjab, India
- Height: 5 ft 6 in (168 cm)

Sport
- Sport: Field hockey
- Position: Center forward
National team
Years	Team	Caps	Goals
1952–1964	India		-
Medal record
Men's field hockey
Representing India
Olympic Games
Gold medal – first place	1952 Helsinki	Team
Gold medal – first place	1956 Melbourne	Team
Gold medal – first place	1964 Tokyo	Team
Silver medal – second place	1960 Rome	Team
Asian Games
Silver medal – second place	1958 Tokyo	Team

Udham Singh Kular (4 August 1928 – 23 March 2000) was an Indian hockey player from Sansarpur, Jalandhar, Punjab, India. He played in 1952 Summer Olympics Helsinki, 1956 Summer Olympics Melbourne, 1960 Summer Olympics Rome and 1964 Summer Olympics Tokyo. He shares the distinction of being one of only two Indian players to win four Olympic medals, the other being Leslie Claudius. He scored 14 goals from total of 14 Olympic matches

== Early life ==
Udham was born on 4 August 1928 at Sansarpur, a small village near the Jalandhar Cantonment of Punjab. He studied at Victor High School and DAV College, Jalandhar. Although Udham had a short stature of 5 feet 6 inches and weighed only 58 kg, it never affected his game.

== Domestic hockey ==
In 1947 Udham was named the Captain of his College Hockey team and was recruited by the Punjab Police the same year, which had one of the best Hockey teams in the nation at the time. For a period of 18 years he played for Punjab Police, and led the team a couple of times during the tenure. Udham was named the Captain of the State Hockey team of Punjab in 1954.

== International hockey ==
Udham Singh would have made his Olympics debut in London in 1948, but due to a finger injury he missed the chance. He played in a Hockey Series against Afghanistan in 1949, contributing to India’s victory. Udham was a part of the Indian Hockey squad at Helsinki Olympics in 1952 where Captain K.D. Singh Babu led the Indian team to a Gold Medal win, and at the Melbourne Olympics in 1956 where Balbir Singh Senior successfully led the Indian team to save the Gold Medal. Udham also played in the Rome Olympics in 1960 and at the Tokyo Olympics in 1964, his last Olympic games. At Rome, Pakistan defeated India in the Finals, while the Indian team snatched its Gold Medal back from Pakistan in Tokyo defeating the opponents by 1-0. Udham delivered his best performance at the Tokyo Asian Games in 1958 but still couldn’t get India the Gold as Pakistan beat India on the basis of better goal average.

Udham Singh is one of the two hockey players to win 3 golds and a silver in the Olympics, the other being Leslie Claudius. He was also awarded the Arjuna Award by the Indian Government. He was a Half back but had the adaptability to play from Left Inside, Right Inside, Center Forward and Center Half positions as well.

== Captaincy ==
He was named the Captain of the Indian Hockey Federation team that went to a Warsaw tour in 1955 and to East Africa in 1959. Udham also led the Indian squad to World Cup Hockey held at Lyon, France.

== Coaching ==
Udham Singh served as the Coach of the Indian Hockey team and successfully got the team a bronze Medal at the Mexico Olympics in 1968 and the silver medal at the Bangkok Asian Games in 1970. After his retirement from playing hockey, he turned to coaching young male teams.

== Awards ==
- Arjuna Award in 1965.
