= Raghbir Lal =

Indian field hockey player (1929–2025)

Olympic medal record

Men's field hockey

Representing India
Gold medal – first place	1952 Helsinki	Team competition
Gold medal – first place	1956 Melbourne	Team competition

Raghbir Lal Sharma (15 November 1929 – 7 April 2025) was an Indian hockey player. He was part of the Indian field hockey team that won gold medals at the 1952 and 1956 Summer Olympics.

Lal died on 7 April 2025, at the age of 95.

== Sources ==
- Raghbir Lal's profile at databaseOlympics
