= Leslie Claudius =

Indian field hockey player

Personal information
- Full name: Leslie Walter Claudius
- Born: 25 March 1927 Bilaspur, British India
- Died: 20 December 2012 (aged 85) Kolkata, West Bengal, India
- Height: 5 ft 4 in (163 cm)

Sport
- Sport: Field hockey
- Position: Halfback
Senior career
Years	Team	Caps	Goals
–	Bengal Nagpur Railway	-	-
–	Calcutta Customs	-	-
National team
Years	Team	Caps	Goals
1948–1960	India	100+	-
Medal record
Men's Field Hockey
Representing India
Olympic Games
Gold medal – first place	1948 London	Team
Gold medal – first place	1952 Helsinki	Team
Gold medal – first place	1956 Melbourne	Team
Silver medal – second place	1960 Rome	Team
Asian Games
Silver medal – second place	1958 Tokyo	Team

Leslie Walter Claudius (25 March 1927 – 20 December 2012) was an Indian field hockey player from Bilaspur. He studied in South Eastern Railway (Now SECR) English Medium School Bilaspur, which has produced many national sportsmen.

Leslie Claudius shares with Udham Singh the distinction of being one of the only two Indian players to win four Olympic medals in field hockey. To his gold medals in 1948, 1952 and 1956, he added a silver in 1960 when he captained the team that reached the final against Pakistan. He was the first player ever to earn 100 caps, and competed for India, in addition to the Olympics, on their European tour of 1949, Malaysian tour of 1952, Australian and New Zealand tours of 1955, and at the 3rd Asian Games in 1958. After the 1960 Olympics, he continued to compete domestically, retiring after the 1965 season. In 1971, he became the sixth Indian hockey player to be given the Padma Shri Civil award by the Indian government.

Leslie Claudius had joined Calcutta Customs Department as Preventive Officer and retired as Assistant Collector of Customs. He was a member of Calcutta Customs Club and represented the Calcutta Port Customs Commissionerate in the Aga Khan Tournament in 1948. Leslie Claudius not only brought international glory but also kept the Calcutta Customs Club flag flying high.

== Career ==
=== Early career ===
Claudius was initially interested in football and as an accomplished player, he got a chance to play for the Bengal and Nagpur Railway. But, his talent in field hockey was spotted by Dickie Carr, who was a part of the Indian team that won the gold medal at the 1936 Olympics. Claudius was then inducted into the Bengal and Nagpur Railway hockey team that Carr was a part of. The team finished second in the Beighton Cup and Claudius quit football for hockey.

=== International career ===
Claudius was a member of India's generation of hockey that won the Olympic gold in 1948, 1952 and 1956 and silver in 1960. He was the first hockey player to have competed in four Olympics and also the first to earn a hundred international caps. He captained the Indian team for the first team in 1959, with Dhyan Chand, often considered India's greatest hockey player ever as the coach, and led them to the second-place finish at the 1960 Olympics in Rome.

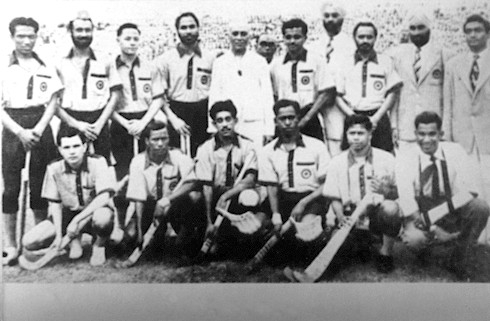
Helsinki Olympic Gold Medal Winning Team with Prime Minister Jawaharlal Nehru In 1952

=== Team Manager ===
Claudius was appointed as the manager of the Indian team in 1978 for the Bangkok Asian Games.

== Personal life ==
Leslie Walter Claudius was born to a middle class Anglo-Indian family. His son, Robert, was also an Indian international who represented his country at the World Cup in Argentina in 1978. Leslie died after a prolonged battle with cirrhosis of liver. Leslie had three more sons, one who stayed with him in Kolkata and two who live in Melbourne. His son Robert (Bobby) Claudius played Hockey World Cup in Argentina for India in 1978; he died the same year in Kolkata (then Calcutta) in a road accident.

== Awards and recognition ==
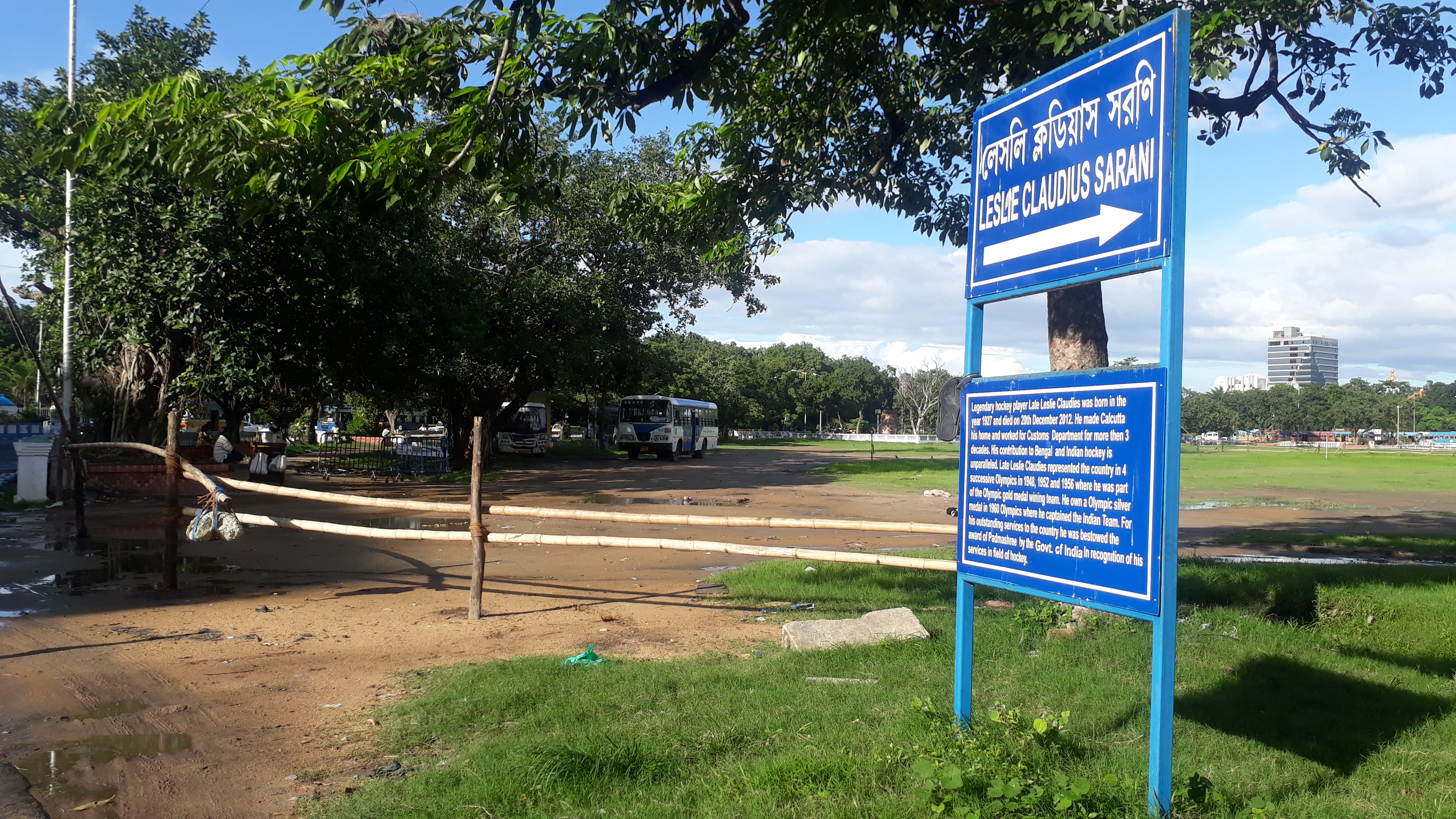
Leslie Claudius Sarani, a road named after Claudius

- In 1971 he was awarded the Padma Shri.
- Mention in the Guinness Book of World Records along with Udham Singh for having won the most number of Olympic medals in field hockey.
- In 2011 The West Bengal Chief Minister Mamata Banerjee presented the Bharat Gaurav award instituted by East Bengal Club to Leslie Claudius.
- For the 2012 Olympics, the Bushey tube station was renamed after Claudius in the special "Olympic Legends Map". He was one of six all-time hockey greats who were honored in this manner.
- In 2012 he was awarded The Banga Bibhushan.
- Plassy Gate Road in Kolkata was renamed after him as Leslie Claudius Sarani in 2015.

== Death ==
Claudius died in Kolkata on 20 December 2012, after a prolonged battle with cirrhosis of liver. He was survived by his wife and three sons. He is buried in Lower Circular Road cemetery, Kolkata.

== See also ==
- List of Indian field hockey captains in Olympics
