= Field hockey at the 1968 Summer Olympics – Men's team squads =

The following is the list of squads that took place in the men's field hockey tournament at the 1968 Summer Olympics.

== Group A ==
=== Belgium ===
The following players represented Belgium:

- Jean-Marie Buisset
- André Muschs
- Marc Legros
- Georges Vanderhulst
- Jean-Louis le Clerc
- Yves Bernaert
- Michel Deville
- Claude Ravinet
- Guy Miserque
- Jean-Louis Roersch
- Jean-François Gilles
- Daniel Dupont
- Armand Solie
- William Hansen
- Charly Bouvy

=== East Germany ===
The following players represented East Germany:

- Rainer Stephan
- Axel Thieme
- Eckhard Wallossek
- Klaus Bahner
- Horst Brennecke
- Dieter Klauß
- Lothar Lippert
- Dieter Ehrlich
- Karl-Heinz Freiberger
- Reinhart Sasse
- Hans-Dietrich Sasse
- Rolf Thieme
- Klaus Träumer
- Helmut Rabis

=== India ===
The following players represented India:

- Rajendra Christy
- Krishnamurty Perumal
- John "V.J." Peter
- Inam-ur Rahman
- Munir Sait
- Ajitpal Singh
- Balbir Singh Kullar
- Balbir Singh Kular
- Balbir Singh Grewal
- Gurbux Singh
- Gurbux Singh Grewal
- Harbinder Singh
- Harmik Singh
- Inder "Gogi" Singh
- Prithipal Singh
- Tarsem Singh
- Jagjit Singh

=== Japan ===
The following players represented Japan:

- Norihiko Matsumoto
- Katsuhiro Yuzaki
- Akio Takashima
- Shigeo Kaoku
- Tsuneya Yuzaki
- Akio Kudo
- Kyoichi Nagaya
- Hiroshi Tanaka
- Shozo Nishimura
- Masashi Onda
- Minoru Yoshimura
- Akihito Wada
- Yukio Kamimura
- Kazuo Kawamura

=== Mexico ===
The following players represented Mexico:

- José Antonio Prud'homme
- David Sevilla
- Javier Varela
- Adrian Maycsell
- Zeno Fernández
- Orlando Ventura
- Héctor Bustamante
- Héctor Ventura
- Oscar Huacuja
- Juan Calderón
- Humberto Gutiérrez
- Robert Villaseñor
- Enrique Filoteo
- Jorge Bada
- Manuel Fernández
- Noel Gutiérrez
- Adán Noriega

=== New Zealand ===
The following players represented New Zealand:

- John Anslow
- Jan Borren
- Roger Capey
- John Christensen
- John Hicks
- Bruce Judge
- Alan McIntyre
- Ross McPherson
- Barry Maister
- Selwyn Maister
- Alan Patterson
- Ted Salmon
- Keith Thomson

=== Spain ===
The following players represented Spain:

- Carlos del Coso
- Antonio Nogués
- Julio Solaun
- José Sallés
- José Antonio Dinarés
- Narciso Ventalló
- Agustín Masaña
- Juan Quintana
- Francisco Amat
- Jorge Fábregas
- Jorge Vidal
- José Colomer
- Juan Amat
- Francisco Fábregas
- Juan José Alvear
- Rafael Camiña
- Pedro Amat

=== West Germany ===
The following players represented West Germany:

- Wolfgang Rott
- Günther Krauss
- Utz Aichinger
- Jürgen Wein
- Klaus Greinert
- Uli Vos
- Detlev Kittstein
- Norbert Schuler
- Fritz Schmidt
- Carsten Keller
- Michael Krause
- Wolfgang Müller
- Dirk Michel
- Eckardt Suhl
- Ulrich Sloma
- Hermann End
- Friedrich Josten
- Wolfgang Baumgart

== Group B ==
=== Argentina ===
The following players represented Argentina:

- Eduardo Guelfand
- Armando Cicognini
- Jorge Piccioli
- Osvaldo Monti
- Fernando Calp
- Jorge Tanuscio
- Eduardo Anderson
- Héctor Marinoni
- Gerardo Lorenzo
- Alberto Disera
- Rodolfo Monti
- Jorge Sabbione
- Gabriel Scally
- Daniel Portugués
- Alfredo Quaquarini
- Jorge Giannini
- Carlos Kenny
- Jorge Suárez

=== Australia ===
The following players represented Australia:

- Paul Dearing
- Raymond Evans
- Brian Glencross
- Robert Haigh
- Donald Martin
- James Mason
- Patrick Nilan
- Eric Pearce
- Gordon Pearce
- Julian Pearce
- Desmond Piper
- Fred Quine
- Ronald Riley
- Donald Smart
- Arthur Busch

=== France ===
The following players represented France:

- Jean-Paul Sauthier
- Jean-Claude Merkes
- Patrick Burtschell
- Gilles Verrier
- Marc Chapon
- Georges Corbel
- Claude Windal
- Stéphane Joinau
- Charles Pous
- Richard Dodrieux
- Jean-Paul Capelle
- Philippe Vignon
- Georges Grain
- Alain Pascarel
- Albert Vanpoulle
- Bernard Arlin
- Jean-Paul Petit
- Michel Windal

=== Great Britain ===
The following players represented Great Britain:

- Harry Cahill
- Roger Flood
- John Neill
- Jim Deegan
- Richard Oliver
- David Wilman
- Gerald Carr
- Tony Ekins
- Keith Sinclair
- Andrew Trentham
- Jeremy Barham
- Basil Christensen
- Charles Donald
- Timothy Lawson
- Stuart Morris
- Malcolm Read
- Colin Whalley
- Peter Wilson

=== Kenya ===
The following players represented Kenya:

- John Simonian
- Kirpal Singh Bhardwaj
- Avtar Singh Sohal
- Mohamed Ajmal Malik
- Surjeet Singh Panesar
- Silvester Fernandes
- Leo Fernandes
- Hilary Fernandes
- Davinder Singh Deegan
- Santokh Singh Matharu
- Alu Mendonca
- Harvinder Singh Marwa
- Egbert Fernandes
- Renny Pereira

=== Malaysia ===
The following players represented Malaysia:

- Ho Koh Chye
- Francis Belavantheran
- Sri Shanmuganathan
- Michael Arulraj
- Kunaratnam Alagaratnam
- Ameen-ud-Din bin Mohamed Ibrahim
- Joseph Johnson
- Savinder Singh
- Arumugam Sabapathy
- Yang Siow Ming
- Koh Hock Seng
- Harnahal Singh Sewa
- Koh Chong Jin
- Shamuganathan Jeevajothy
- Rajaratnam Yogeswaran
- Kuldip Singh Uijeer
- Loong Whey Pyu

=== Netherlands ===
The following players represented the Netherlands:

- Joost Boks
- Aart Brederode
- Edo Buma
- Sebo Ebbens
- John Elffers
- Jan Piet Fokker
- Otto ter Haar
- Gerard Hijlkema
- Arie de Keyzer
- Ewald Kist
- Tippy de Lanoy Meijer
- Frans Spits
- Heiko van Staveren
- Theo Terlingen
- Kik Thole
- Theo van Vroonhoven
- Piet Weemers

=== Pakistan ===
The following players represented Pakistan:

- Abdul Rashid
- Jahangir Butt
- Tanvir Dar
- Gulraiz Akhtar
- Khalid Mahmood
- Muhammad Asad Malik
- Muhammad Ashfaq Ahmed
- Tariq Niazi
- Riaz Ahmed
- Riaz-ud-Din
- Saeed Anwar
- Tariq Aziz
- Zakir Hussain
