= Pakistan national field hockey team results (1960–1969) =

These are all the international matches played by Pakistan national field hockey team from 1960 to 1969.

== Results ==
=== 1960 ===
Test series

20 July 1960
Match 1

Kenya	2 - 4	Pakistan
	Report

Location: Nairobi, Kenya

Venue: City Park Hockey Stadium

30 July 1960
Match 2

Kenya	3 - 1	Pakistan
	Report

Location: Nairobi, Kenya

Venue: City Park Hockey Stadium

1 August 1960
Match 3

Kenya	1 - 2	Pakistan
	Report

Location: Nairobi, Kenya

Venue: City Park Hockey Stadium

1960 Summer Olympics

26 August 1960
Pool match

Pakistan	3 - 0	Australia
Hamid 48'; Alam 53'; Mushtaq 56'	Report

Location: Rome, Italy

Venue: Stadio dei Marmi

29 August 1960
Pool match

Pakistan	8 - 0	Poland
Hamid 6', 24', 55'; Alam 18'; Motiullah 22'; Waheed 45', 69'; Naseer 60'	Report

Location: Rome, Italy

Venue: Stadio dei Marmi

1 September 1960
Pool match

Japan	0 - 10	Pakistan
	Report	Waheed 21', 30'; Hamid 24', 37', 50', 51'; Naseer 33', 45', 60'; Anwar 59'

Location: Rome, Italy

Venue: Stadio dei Marmi

5 September 1960
Quarterfinal

Pakistan	2 - 1	United Team of Germany
Naseer 22', 62'	Report	Delmes 52'

Location: Rome, Italy

Venue: Olympic Velodrome

7 September 1960
Semifinal

Pakistan	1 - 0	Spain
Atif 12'	Report

Location: Rome, Italy

Venue: Olympic Velodrome

9 September 1960
Final

Pakistan	1 - 0	India
Naseer 6'	Report

Location: Rome, Italy

Venue: Olympic Velodrome

15 September 1960
Test match

Netherlands	1 - 2	Pakistan
de Beer 38'	Report	Waheed 23'; Naseer 54'

Location: Amsterdam, Netherlands

Venue: Wagener Stadium

=== 1961 ===
Test series

26 December 1961
Match 1

Singapore	0 - 2	Pakistan
	Report	Niazi 11', 23'

Location: Kallang, Singapore

Venue: Jalan Besar Stadium

27 December 1961
Match 2

Singapore	0 - 4	Pakistan
	Report	Niazi 10', 32'; Naseer 24', 35'

Location: Kallang, Singapore

Venue: Jalan Besar Stadium

28 December 1961
Match 3

Malaya	1 - 3	Pakistan
Ismail 1'	Report	Atif 34'; Waheed 51'; Naseer 61'

Location: Kallang, Singapore

Venue: Jalan Besar Stadium

30 December 1961
Match 4

Malaya	0 - 0	Pakistan
	Report

Location: Kuala Lumpur, Malaya

Venue: Stadium Merdeka

=== 1962 ===
Test series

2 January 1962
Match 1

Ceylon	1 - 9	Pakistan
	Report

Location: Colombo, Ceylon

Venue: Colombo Hockey and Football Club

4 January 1962
Match 2

Ceylon	0 - 5	Pakistan
	Report

Location: Colombo, Ceylon

Venue: Colombo Hockey and Football Club

Test series

21 July 1962
Match 1

Kenya	0 - 1	Pakistan
	Report

Location: Nairobi, Kenya

Venue: City Park Hockey Stadium

22 July 1962
Match 2

Kenya	1 - 0	Pakistan
	Report

Location: Nairobi, Kenya

Venue: City Park Hockey Stadium

4 August 1962
Match 3

Kenya	0 - 3	Pakistan
	Report

Location: Mombasa, Kenya

Venue: Mombasa Sports Club

6 August 1962
Match 4

Kenya	1 - 2	Pakistan
	Report

Location: Nairobi, Kenya

Venue: City Park Hockey Stadium

14 August 1962
Test match

Ceylon	0 - 6	Pakistan
	Report

Location: Colombo, Ceylon

Venue: Colombo Hockey and Football Club

1962 Asian Games

25 August 1962
Pool match

Pakistan	5 - 0	Japan
	Report

Location: Jakarta, Indonesia

Venue: Senayan Hockey Stadium

27 August 1962
Pool match

Ceylon	1 - 9	Pakistan
Abeysekera 52'	Report	Waheed 1', 4', 19', 20', 59'; Alam 17'; Naseer 28'; Dar 42'; Motiullah 53'

Location: Jakarta, Indonesia

Venue: Senayan Hockey Stadium

29 August 1962
Pool match

Pakistan	4 - 0	Singapore
Naseer 1', 70'; Waheed 28'; Dar 53'	Report

Location: Jakarta, Indonesia

Venue: Senayan Hockey Stadium

30 August 1962
Pool match

Indonesia	0 - 8	Pakistan
	Report

Location: Jakarta, Indonesia

Venue: Senayan Hockey Stadium

2 September 1962
Semifinal

Pakistan	5 - 0	Malaya
Waheed 3', 12', 51'; Naseer 18', 58'	Report

Location: Jakarta, Indonesia

Venue: Senayan Hockey Stadium

3 September 1962
Final

India	0 - 2	Pakistan
	Report	Atif 33'; Waheed 39'

Location: Jakarta, Indonesia

Venue: Senayan Hockey Stadium

8 September 1962
Test match

Singapore	0 - 3	Pakistan
	Report	Asad 34'; Motiullah 41'; Bashir 70'

Location: Kallang, Singapore

Venue: Jalan Besar Stadium

Test series

4 December 1962
Match 1

Pakistan	3 - 0	Kenya
	Report

Location: Multan, Pakistan

Venue:

7 December 1962
Match 2

Pakistan	1 - 1	Kenya
	Report

Location: Lahore, Pakistan

Venue: Gaddafi Stadium

12 December 1962
Match 3

Pakistan	1 - 0	Kenya
	Report

Location: Rawalpindi, Pakistan

Venue: Army Hockey Stadium

18 December 1962
Match 4

Pakistan	5 - 0	Kenya
	Report

Location: Dhaka, Pakistan

Venue: Dhaka Stadium

20 December 1962
Match 5

Pakistan	0 - 0	Kenya
	Report

Location: Karachi, Pakistan

Venue: National Stadium

=== 1963 ===
Lyon Hockey Festival

28 September 1963
Match 1

Pakistan	0 - 0	Spain
	Report

Location: Lyon, France

Venue: Lyon Hockey and Tennis Club

29 September 1963
Match 2

Netherlands	2 - 1	Pakistan
Voigt 8'; Fiolet 39'	Report	Mahmood 51'

Location: Lyon, France

Venue: Lyon Hockey and Tennis Club

30 September 1963
Match 3

Pakistan	3 - 0	Great Britain
	Report

Location: Lyon, France

Venue: Lyon Hockey and Tennis Club

2 October 1963
Match 4

Pakistan	1 - 0	Belgium
	Report

Location: Lyon, France

Venue: Lyon Hockey and Tennis Club

3 October 1963
Match 5

Japan	0 - 2	Pakistan
	Report

Location: Lyon, France

Venue: Lyon Hockey and Tennis Club

5 October 1963
Match 6

Pakistan	7 - 0	United States
	Report

Location: Lyon, France

Venue: Lyon Hockey and Tennis Club

6 October 1963
Match 7

West Germany	1 - 0	Pakistan
Kranich 16'	Report

Location: Lyon, France

Venue: Lyon Hockey and Tennis Club

20 October 1963
Test match

Wales	0 - 2	Pakistan
	Report

Location: Brussels, Belgium

Venue:

Test series

21 October 1963
Match 1

Belgium	0 - 4	Pakistan
	Report

Location: Brussels, Belgium

Venue:

22 October 1963
Match 2

Belgium	2 - 4	Pakistan
	Report

Location: Brussels, Belgium

Venue:

Test series

26 October 1963
Match 1

Netherlands	2 - 3	Pakistan
Spits 39' van Voorhout 52'	Report	Asad 10', 15', 65'

Location: Zwolle, Netherlands

Venue:

27 October 1963
Match 2

Netherlands	1 - 2	Pakistan
Voigt 53'	Report	Dar 10', 30'

Location: Amstelveen, Netherlands

Venue: Wagener Stadium

=== 1964 ===
Test series

11 April 1964
Match 1

Pakistan	3 - 0	Japan
	Report

Location: Lahore, Pakistan

Venue: Gaddafi Stadium

16 April 1964
Match 2

Pakistan	0 - 0	Japan
	Report

Location: Rawalpindi, Pakistan

Venue: Army Hockey Stadium

20 April 1964
Match 3

Pakistan	2 - 1	Japan
	Report

Location: Karachi, Pakistan

Venue: National Stadium

Test series

19 September 1964
Match 1

Australia	2 - 1	Pakistan
	Report

Location: Melbourne, Australia

Venue: Essendon Cricket Club

20 September 1964
Match 2

Australia	1 - 2	Pakistan
Piper 58'	Report	Dar 15'; Manna 43'

Location: Sydney, Australia

Venue: Wentworth Park

1964 Summer Olympics

11 October 1964
Pool match

Pakistan	1 - 0	Japan
Atif 11'	Report

Location: Tokyo, Japan

Venue: Komazawa Hockey Field

12 October 1964
Pool match

Pakistan	5 - 2	Kenya
Atif 20', 42', 61'; Zakauddin 22'; Dar 55'	Report	Sohal 32'; Panesar 34'

Location: Tokyo, Japan

Venue: Komazawa Hockey Field

15 October 1964
Pool match

Great Britain	0 - 1	Pakistan
	Report	Dar 51'

Location: Tokyo, Japan

Venue: Komazawa Hockey Field

16 October 1964
Pool match

Pakistan	6 - 0	Rhodesia
Manna 6', 18', 57'; Mahmood 19'; Asad 22'; Atif 62'	Report

Location: Tokyo, Japan

Venue: Komazawa Hockey Field

18 October 1964
Pool match

New Zealand	0 - 2	Pakistan
	Report	Dar 19'; Manna 51'

Location: Tokyo, Japan

Venue: Komazawa Hockey Field

19 October 1964
Pool match

Australia	1 - 2	Pakistan
Nilan 13'	Report	Atif 25'; Asad 46'

Location: Tokyo, Japan

Venue: Komazawa Hockey Field

21 October 1964
Semifinal

Pakistan	3 - 0	Spain
Dar 16', 40'; Zakauddin 61'	Report

Location: Tokyo, Japan

Venue: Komazawa Hockey Field

23 October 1964
Final

Pakistan	0 - 1	India
	Report	Mohinder 40'

Location: Tokyo, Japan

Venue: Komazawa Hockey Field

2 November 1964
Test match

Pakistan	1 - 1	Netherlands
Niazi 41'	Report	van't Hooft 16'

Location: Karachi, Pakistan

Venue: National Stadium

=== 1965 ===
Test series

April 1965
Match 1

Indonesia	0 - 8	Pakistan
	[Record absent]

Location: Jakarta, Indonesia

Venue:

April 1965
Match 2

Indonesia	0 - 8	Pakistan
	[Record absent]

Location: Jakarta, Indonesia

Venue:

Test series

22 August 1965
Match 1

Kenya	0 - 0	Pakistan
	Report

Location: Nairobi, Kenya

Venue: City Park Hockey Stadium

29 August 1965
Match 2

Kenya	0 - 0	Pakistan
	Report

Location: Nairobi, Kenya

Venue: City Park Hockey Stadium

8 September 1965
Match 3

Kenya	0 - 0	Pakistan
	Report

Location: Kisumu, Kenya

Venue: Turf Pitch Ground

11 September 1965
Match 4

Kenya	2 - 1	Pakistan
	Report

Location: Nairobi, Kenya

Venue: City Park Hockey Stadium

12 September 1965
Match 5

Kenya	0 - 3	Pakistan
	Report

Location: Nairobi, Kenya

Venue: City Park Hockey Stadium

20 September 1965
Match 6

Kenya	0 - 1	Pakistan
	Report

Location: Mombasa, Kenya

Venue: Mombasa Sports Club

25 September 1965
Match 7

Kenya	1 - 1	Pakistan
	Report

Location: Nairobi, Kenya

Venue: City Park Hockey Stadium

4 September 1965
Test match

Uganda	1 - 3	Pakistan
	[Record absent]

Location: Kampala, Uganda

Venue:

Test match

Zanzibar	1 - 2	Pakistan
Fernandes	Report

Location: Zanzibar City, Tanzania

Venue: Mao Tse Tung Stadium

=== 1966 ===
6 May 1966
Test match

Belgium	0 - 1	Pakistan
	Report

Location: Brussels, Belgium

Venue:

7 May 1966
Test match

Netherlands	0 - 1	Pakistan
	Report	Niazi 64'

Location: Amstelveen, Netherlands

Venue: Wagener Stadium

Hamburg Hockey Festival

14 May 1966
Match 1

West Germany	1 - 0	Pakistan
	Report

Location: Hamburg, West Germany

Venue:

15 May 1966
Match 2

Pakistan	1 - 0	Belgium
	Report

Location: Hamburg, West Germany

Venue:

16 May 1966
Match 3

Pakistan	1 - 0	Switzerland
	Report

Location: Hamburg, West Germany

Venue:

18 May 1966
Match 4

Poland	1 - 1	Pakistan
	Report

Location: Hamburg, West Germany

Venue:

19 May 1966
Match 5

India	1 - 1	Pakistan
	Report

Location: Hamburg, West Germany

Venue:

21 May 1966
Match 6

Pakistan	3 - 0	Great Britain
	Report

Location: Hamburg, West Germany

Venue:

22 May 1966
Match 7

Netherlands	2 - 1	Pakistan
Fokker 53' de Keyzer 67'	Report	Aziz 45'

Location: Hamburg, West Germany

Venue:

Test series

25 September 1966
Match 1

Pakistan	2 - 0	West Germany
	Report

Location: Lahore, Pakistan

Venue: Gaddafi Stadium

28 September 1966
Match 2

Pakistan	1 - 0	West Germany
Waheed 56'	Report

Location: Rawalpindi, Pakistan

Venue: Army Hockey Stadium

30 September 1966
Match 3

Pakistan	3 - 1	West Germany
	Report

Location: Peshawar, Pakistan

Venue: Peshawar Gymkhana Ground

4 October 1966
Match 4

Pakistan	0 - 0	West Germany
	Report

Location: Karachi, Pakistan

Venue: National Stadium

Test series

5 November 1966
Match 1

Kenya	0 - 1	Pakistan
	Report

Location: Nairobi, Kenya

Venue: City Park Hockey Stadium

6 November 1966
Match 2

Kenya	0 - 0	Pakistan
	Report

Location: Nairobi, Kenya

Venue: City Park Hockey Stadium

12 November 1966
Match 3

Kenya	1 - 0	Pakistan
	Report

Location: Nairobi, Kenya

Venue: City Park Hockey Stadium

13 November 1966
Match 4

Kenya	0 - 1	Pakistan
	Report

Location: Nairobi, Kenya

Venue: City Park Hockey Stadium

19 November 1966
Match 5

Kenya	0 - 1	Pakistan
	Report

Location: Nairobi, Kenya

Venue: City Park Hockey Stadium

20 November 1966
Match 6

Kenya	1 - 1	Pakistan
	Report

Location: Nairobi, Kenya

Venue: City Park Hockey Stadium

1966 Asian Games

12 December 1966
Pool match

Pakistan	0 - 0	Japan
	Report

Location: Bangkok, Thailand

Venue: Thephasadin Stadium

13 December 1966
Pool match

Pakistan	5 - 0	Hong Kong
	Report

Location: Bangkok, Thailand

Venue: Thephasadin Stadium

15 December 1966
Pool match

Pakistan	13 - 0	Thailand
	Report

Location: Bangkok, Thailand

Venue: Thephasadin Stadium

16 December 1966
Semifinal

Pakistan	5 - 1	Malaysia
Mahmood 8', 62', 65'; Jahangir 60'; Asad 63'	Report	Yogeswaran 25'

Location: Bangkok, Thailand

Venue: Thephasadin Stadium

19 December 1966
Final

Pakistan	0 - 1 (a.e.t.)	India
	Report	Balbir 90'

Location: Bangkok, Thailand

Venue: Thephasadin Stadium

=== 1967 ===
Test series

4 February 1967
Match 1

Pakistan	1 - 1	Netherlands
Laeeq 18'	Report	Zweerts 23'

Location: Lahore, Pakistan

Venue: Gaddafi Stadium

6 February 1967
Match 2

Pakistan	3 - 1	Netherlands
	Report	de Keyzer 13'

Location: Dhaka, Pakistan

Venue: Dhaka Stadium

8 February 1967
Match 3

Pakistan	2 - 0	Netherlands
Niazi 20'; Laeeq 30'	Report

Location: Karachi, Pakistan

Venue: National Stadium

Test series

1 October 1967
Match 1

Pakistan	2 - 1	Australia
	Report

Location: Lahore, Pakistan

Venue: Gaddafi Stadium

3 October 1967
Match 2

Pakistan	2 - 0	Australia
Niazi 12'; Dar 68'	Report

Location: Rawalpindi, Pakistan

Venue: Army Hockey Stadium

8 October 1967
Match 3

Pakistan	3 - 0	Australia
	Report

Location: Karachi, Pakistan

Venue: National Stadium

London Hockey Festival

16 October 1967
Match 1

West Germany	2 - 1	Pakistan
	Report

Location: London, England

Venue: The Oval

17 October 1967
Match 2

Pakistan	1 - 2	East Germany
	Report

Location: London, England

Venue: The Oval

18 October 1967
Match 3

Pakistan	2 - 0	Belgium
	Report

Location: London, England

Venue: The Oval

19 October 1967
Match 4

Netherlands	0 - 1	Pakistan
	Report	Jahangir 48'

Location: London, England

Venue: The Oval

21 October 1967
Match 5

Pakistan	1 - 0	India
Aziz 60'	Report

Location: London, England

Venue: The Oval

29 October 1967
Test match

Netherlands	2 - 2	Pakistan
Fokker 10'; Zweerts 26'	Report	Niazi 44'; Rehman 63'

Location: Amstelveen, Netherlands

Venue: Wagener Stadium

=== 1968 ===
Lahore Hockey Festival

20 January 1968
Match 1

Pakistan	0 - 0	Spain
	Report

Location: Lahore, Pakistan

Venue: National Hockey Stadium

22 January 1968
Match 2

Pakistan	2 - 0	Ceylon
Aziz 19'; Laeeq 51'	Report

Location: Lahore, Pakistan

Venue: National Hockey Stadium

24 January 1968
Match 3

Singapore	0 - 3	Pakistan
	Report

Location: Lahore, Pakistan

Venue: National Hockey Stadium

25 January 1968
Match4

Malaysia	0 - 2	Pakistan
	Report

Location: Lahore, Pakistan

Venue: National Hockey Stadium

27 January 1968
Match 5

West Germany	0 - 1	Pakistan
	Report

Location: Lahore, Pakistan

Venue: National Hockey Stadium

28 January 1968
Match 6

Pakistan	0 - 0	Kenya
	Report

Location: Lahore, Pakistan

Venue: National Hockey Stadium

31 January 1968
Test match

Pakistan	3 - 0	Kenya
	Report

Location: Karachi, Pakistan

Venue: Hockey Club of Pakistan

Four Nations Nairobi

10 March 1968
Match 1

Uganda	0 - 0	Pakistan
	Report

Location: Nairobi, Kenya

Venue: City Park Hockey Stadium

12 March 1968
Match 2

Pakistan	12 - 0	Nigeria
	Report

Location: Nairobi, Kenya

Venue: City Park Hockey Stadium

16 March 1968
Match 3

Pakistan	3 - 0	Germany
	Report

Location: Nairobi, Kenya

Venue: City Park Hockey Stadium

17 March 1968
Match 4

Kenya	0 - 0	Pakistan
	Report

Location: Nairobi, Kenya

Venue: City Park Hockey Stadium

Test series

23 March 1968
Match 1

Kenya	0 - 4	Pakistan
	Report

Location: Nairobi, Kenya

Venue: City Park Hockey Stadium

24 March 1968
Match 2

Kenya	1 - 0	Pakistan
Fernandes 33'	Report

Location: Nairobi, Kenya

Venue: City Park Hockey Stadium

Test series

2 July
Match 1

Pakistan	2 - 0	Japan

Location: Lahore, Pakistan

Venue: National Hockey Stadium

4 July
Match 2

Pakistan	3 - 0	Japan

Location: Rawalpindi, Pakistan

Venue: Army Hockey Stadium

7 July
Match 3

Pakistan	2 - 1	Japan

Location: Karachi, Pakistan

Venue: Hockey Club of Pakistan

1968 Summer Olympics

13 October 1968
Pool match

Pakistan	6 - 0	Netherlands
Dar 6', 63'; Asad 13'; Ashfaq 15'; Rashid Jr. 50', 58'	Report

Location: Mexico City, Mexico

Venue: Municipal Stadium

14 October 1968
Pool match

Pakistan	1 - 0	France
Rashid Jr. 52'	Report

Location: Mexico City, Mexico

Venue: Municipal Stadium

16 October 1968
Pool match

Australia	2 - 3	Pakistan
Glencross 23'; Riley 33'	Report	Rashid Jr. 2'; Aziz 40', 54'

Location: Mexico City, Mexico

Venue: Municipal Stadium

17 October 1968
Pool match

Argentina	0 - 5	Pakistan
	Report	Dar 3', 52'; Asad 12'; Rashid Jr. 15', 29'

Location: Mexico City, Mexico

Venue: Municipal Stadium

19 October 1968
Pool match

Pakistan	2 - 1	Great Britain
Dar 10'; Ashfaq 53'	Report	Neill 60'

Location: Mexico City, Mexico

Venue: Municipal Stadium

20 October 1968
Pool match

Kenya	1 - 2	Pakistan
Deegan 69'	Report	Dar 9'; Niazi 21'

Location: Mexico City, Mexico

Venue: Municipal Stadium

21 October 1968
Pool match

Pakistan	4 - 0	Malaysia
Asad 9', 69'; Akhtar 46'; Niazi 52'	Report

Location: Mexico City, Mexico

Venue: Municipal Stadium

24 October 1968
Semifinal

Pakistan	1 - 0	West Germany
Mahmood 16'	Report

Location: Mexico City, Mexico

Venue: Municipal Stadium

26 October 1968
Final

Pakistan	2 - 1	Australia
Rashid Jr. 15'; Asad 56'	Report	Glencross 46'

Location: Mexico City, Mexico

Venue: Municipal Stadium

Test series

9 November 1968
Match 1

East Germany	1 - 0	Pakistan
Sikroski 25'	Report

Location: Leipzig, East Germany

Venue:

11 November 1968
Match 2

East Germany	3 - 1	Pakistan
Sikorski 2'; Thieme 35'; Kasch 57'	Report	Dar 4'

Location: Jena, East Germany

Venue:

=== 1969 ===
Eight Nations Lahore

9 March 1969
Pool match

Pakistan	8 - 0	Malaysia
	Report

Location: Lahore, Pakistan

Venue: National Hockey Stadium

11 March 1969
Pool match

West Germany	0 - 2	Pakistan
	Report

Location: Lahore, Pakistan

Venue: National Hockey Stadium

12 March 1969
Pool match

Pakistan	2 - 0	Spain
	Report

Location: Lahore, Pakistan

Venue: National Hockey Stadium

13 March 1969
Pool match

Belgium	0 - 3	Pakistan
	Report

Location: Lahore, Pakistan

Venue: National Hockey Stadium

14 March 1969
Semifinal

Pakistan	2 - 0	France
	Report

Location: Lahore, Pakistan

Venue: National Hockey Stadium

7 September 1969
Test match

West Germany	2 - 2	Pakistan
Baumgart 25', 49'	Report	Dar 31', 46'

Location: Munich, West Germany

Venue:

14 September 1969
Test match

Netherlands	0 - 1	Pakistan
	Report	Mahmood 25'

Location: Amstelveen, Netherlands

Venue: Wagener Stadium

25 September 1969
Test match

England	0 - 1	Pakistan
	Report

Birmingham, England

Venue: Edgbaston Cricket Ground

27 September 1969
Test match

France	0 - 0	Pakistan
	Report

Location: Paris, France

Venue:

Test series

29 September 1969
Match 1

Spain	1 - 2	Pakistan
Amat 66'	Report	Laeeq 51'; Mahmood 53'

Location: Barcelona, Spain

Venue: Can Salvi

1 October 1969
Match 2

Spain	1 - 3	Pakistan
	Report

Location: Terrassa, Spain

Venue:

4 October 1969
Test match

Italy	0 - 6	Pakistan
	Report

Location: Bologna, Italy

Venue:

Test series

28 December 1969
Match 1

Pakistan	5 - 0	Argentina
	Report

Location: Lahore, Pakistan

Venue: National Hockey Stadium

29 December 1969
Match 2

Pakistan	9 - 1	Argentina
	Report

Location: Lahore, Pakistan

Venue: National Hockey Stadium

== Head-to-head record ==
Won more matches than lost
Won equal matches to lost
Lost more matches than won

- Win Draw Loss

Opponent	GP	W	D	L	GF	GA	First meeting	Last meeting
Kenya	32	17	10	5	47	18	1960	1968
Netherlands	14	9	3	2	27	13	1960	1969
West Germany	11	6	2	3	13	7	1963	1969
Japan	11	9	2	0	30	2	1960	1968
Australia	9	8	0	1	20	8	1960	1968
Spain	7	5	2	0	11	2	1960	1969
Belgium	7	7	0	0	16	2	1963	1969
Malaysia	7	6	1	0	27	2	1961	1969
India	6	3	1	2	5	3	1960	1967
Singapore	5	5	0	0	16	0	1961	1968
Ceylon	5	5	0	0	31	2	1962	1968
Great Britain	4	4	0	0	9	1	1963	1968
Argentina	3	3	0	0	19	1	1968	1969
France	3	2	1	0	3	0	1968	1969
East Germany	3	0	0	3	2	6	1967	1968
Indonesia	3	3	0	0	24	0	1962	1965
Uganda	2	1	1	0	2	1	1965	1968
Poland	2	1	1	0	9	1	1960	1966
Italy	1	1	0	0	6	0	1969	-
England	1	1	0	0	1	0	1969	-
Nigeria	1	1	0	0	12	0	1968	-
Thailand	1	1	0	0	13	0	1966	-
Hong Kong	1	1	0	0	5	0	1966	-
Switzerland	1	1	0	0	1	0	1966	-
Tanzania	1	1	0	0	3	1	1965	-
New Zealand	1	1	0	0	2	0	1964	-
Rhodesia	1	1	0	0	6	0	1964	-
Wales	1	1	0	0	2	0	1963	-
United States	1	1	0	0	7	0	1963	-
United Team of Germany	1	1	0	0	2	1	1960	-
