= Malaysia at the 1968 Summer Olympics =

- IOC code: MAS (MAL used at these Games)
- NOC: Olympic Council of Malaysia

in Mexico City
- Competitors: 31 in 4 sports
- Flag bearer: Nashatar Singh Sidhu
- Medals: Gold 0 Silver 0 Bronze 0 Total 0

Summer Olympics appearances (overview)
- 1956; 1960; 1964; 1968; 1972; 1976; 1980; 1984; 1988; 1992; 1996; 2000; 2004; 2008; 2012; 2016; 2020; 2024

Other related appearances
- North Borneo (1956)

Malaysia competed at the 1968 Summer Olympics in Mexico City, Mexico. 31 competitors, all men, took part in 14 events in 4 sports. This time, Singapore and Malaysia sent separate teams after sending a combined team at the previous Olympics as Singapore was expelled from the federation in 1965.

== Athletics ==
Key

- Note–Ranks given for track events are within the athlete's heat only
- Q = Qualified for the next round
- q = Qualified for the next round as a fastest loser or, in field events, by position without achieving the qualifying target
- NR = National record
- N/A = Round not applicable for the event
- Bye = Athlete not required to compete in round

Men
Track events

| Athlete | Event | Heat | | Quarterfinal | | Semifinal | | Final | |
| Athlete | Event | Result | Rank | Result | Rank | Result | Rank | Result | Rank |
|---|---|---|---|---|---|---|---|---|---|
| Mani Jegathesan | 100 m | 10.35 | 3 Q | 10.38 | 6 | Did not advance | | | |
| Mani Jegathesan | 200 m | 20.92 NR | 3 Q | 21.01 | 4 Q | 21.05 | 8 | Did not advance | |
| Rajalingam Gunaratnam | 200 m | 21.58 | 4 Q | 21.52 | 8 | Did not advance | | | |
| Victor Asirvatham | 400 m | 48.02 | 6 | Did not advance | | | | | |
| Ramasamy Subramaniam | 800 m | 1:50.87 | 4 | —N/a | | Did not advance | | | |
| Ramasamy Subramaniam | 1500 m | 4:06.49 | 10 | —N/a | | Did not advance | | | |
| Ishtiaq Mubarak | 110 m hurdles | 14.36 | 6 | —N/a | | Did not advance | | | |
| Zambrose Abdul Rahman | 400 m hurdles | 53.23 | 8 | —N/a | | Did not advance | | | |
| Mani Jegathesan; Ooi Hock Lim; Rajalingam Gunaratnam; Tambusamy Krishnan | 4 × 100 m relay | 40.69 | 4 Q | —N/a | | 40.89 | 8 | Did not advance | |

Field events

| Athlete | Event | Qualification | | Final | |
| Athlete | Event | Distance | Position | Distance | Position |
|---|---|---|---|---|---|
| Anthony Chong | Long jump | 7.29 | 29 | Did not advance | |
| Nashatar Singh Sidhu | Javelin throw | 70.70 | 23 | Did not advance | |

== Cycling ==
=== Road ===
| Athlete | Event | Time | Rank |
|---|---|---|---|
| Johari Ramli | Men's individual road race | DNF | |
| Ng Joo Pong | Men's individual road race | DNF | |

== Hockey ==
=== Men's tournament ===
Team roster

- Ho Koh Chye (C)
- Francis Belavantheran
- Sri Shanmuganathan
- Michael Arulraj
- Kunaratnam Alagaratnam
- Ameenuddin bin Mohamed Ibrahim
- Joseph Johnson
- Savinder Singh
- Arumugam Sabapathy
- Yang Siow Ming
- Koh Hock Seng
- Harnahal Singh Sewa
- Koh Chong Jin
- Shamuganathan Jeevajothy
- Rajaratnam Yogeswaran
- Kuldip Singh Uijeer
- Loong Whey Pyu

Group B

| Team | Pld | W | D | L | GF | GA | Pts |
|---|---|---|---|---|---|---|---|
| Pakistan | 7 | 7 | 0 | 0 | 23 | 4 | 14 |
| Australia | 7 | 5 | 1 | 2 | 15 | 7 | 11 |
| Kenya | 7 | 4 | 1 | 3 | 13 | 9 | 9 |
| Netherlands | 7 | 4 | 0 | 3 | 11 | 11 | 8 |
| France | 7 | 2 | 1 | 4 | 2 | 5 | 5 |
| Great Britain | 7 | 2 | 1 | 4 | 6 | 8 | 5 |
| Argentina | 7 | 1 | 1 | 5 | 4 | 20 | 3 |
| Malaysia | 7 | 0 | 3 | 4 | 2 | 12 | 3 |

| Qualified for the semifinals |

| Qualified for the 5th – 8th classification round |

13 October 1968

| Malaysia | 0–0 | France |

14 October 1968

| Malaysia | 1–1 | Kenya |

16 October 1968

| Malaysia | 1–1 | Argentina |

17 October 1968

| Australia | 3–0 | Malaysia |

19 October 1968

| Netherlands | 1–0 | Malaysia |

20 October 1968

| Pakistan | 4–0 | Malaysia |

21 October 1968

| Great Britain | 2–0 | Malaysia |

Fifteen and sixteen place match

23 October 1968

| Malaysia | 1–0 | Mexico |

Ranked 15th in final standings

== Weightlifting ==
Men

| Athlete | Event | Military press | | Snatch | | Clean & jerk | | Total | Rank |
| Athlete | Event | Result | Rank | Result | Rank | Result | Rank | Total | Rank |
|---|---|---|---|---|---|---|---|---|---|
| Eun Tin Loy | Lightweight | 110.0 | 16 | 95.0 | 18 | 142.5 | 16 | 347.5 | 18 |
| Leong Chim Seong | Middle heavyweight | 142.5 | 14 | 120.0 | 20 | 160.0 | 19 | 422.5 | 19 |
