= Ventura (surname) =

Ventura is an Italian, Spanish, and Portuguese surname. Not Jewish in origin but some Sephardic Jews adopted this name. Notable people with the surname include:

== Arts and media ==
=== Film, television, and theatre ===
- Amy Austria-Ventura (born 1961), Filipino film and television actress
- Angiolino Giuseppe Pasquale Ventura (1919–1987), Italian actor who starred mainly in French films
- Cassie Ventura, American recording artist, dancer, actress and model, known mononymously as Cassie
- Jesse Ventura (born 1951), American media personality, former politician and retired professional wrestler
- Lino Ventura (1919–1987), Italian actor who starred mainly in French films
- Maria Ventura (1888-1954), Romanian-French actress and theatre director
- Michael Ventura (born 1945), American novelist, film director, and cultural critic
- Montserrat Carulla i Ventura (1930–2020), Catalan actress
- Simona Ventura (born 1965), Italian television presenter, actress and singer
- Susana Ventura (born 1950), American performance artist, actress, and playwright
- Yolanda Ventura (born 1968), Spanish actress and singer

=== Graphic arts ===
- Giorgio Ventura (also Zorzi Ventura), Italian mannerist painter of the Venetian school
- Giovanni Ventura Borghesi (1640–1708), Italian painter of the Baroque period, active mainly in Rome
- Paolo Ventura (photographer) (born 1968), Italian photographer, artist and set designer
- Rosmery Mamani Ventura (born 1985), Bolivian artist

=== Music ===
- Cassie Ventura, American recording artist, dancer, actress and model, known mononymously as Cassie
- Charlie Ventura (1916–1992), tenor saxophonist and bandleader from Philadelphia, Pennsylvania
- Feliu Ventura (born 1976), Spanish singer-songwriter
- Johnny Ventura (1940–2021), Dominican singer and band leader
- José María Ventura Casas (1817-1875), Spanish musician and composer who consolidated the long sardana and reformed the cobla
- Ray Ventura (pianist) (1908-1979), French jazz bandleader
- Roberto Ventura (born 1957), Uruguayan neuropsychologist, psychiatrist, activist, musician, author and professor
- Simona Ventura (born 1965), Italian television presenter, actress and singer
- Yolanda Ventura (born 1968), Spanish actress and singer

=== Writing ===
- Bella Clara Ventura, Colombian-Mexican novelist and poet
- Gastone Ventura (1906-1981), Italian aristocrat
- Guglielmo Ventura (1249/50–c.1322), Italian merchant, public official and chronicler of Asti
- Michael Ventura (born 1945), American novelist, film director, and cultural critic
- Roberto Ventura (born 1957), Uruguayan neuropsychologist, psychiatrist, activist, musician, author and professor
- Susana Ventura (born 1950), American performance artist, actress, and playwright
- Zuenir Ventura (1931–2026), Brazilian journalist and writer

=== Other arts ===
- Cassie Ventura, American recording artist, dancer, actress and model, known mononymously as Cassie
- Miguel Ventura Terra (1866–1919), Portuguese architect
- Susana Ventura (born 1950), American performance artist, actress, and playwright

== Politics and government ==
- Adriana Ventura (born 1969), Brazilian politician
- André Ventura (born 1983), Portuguese politician
- Guglielmo Ventura (1249/50–c.1322), Italian merchant, public official and chronicler of Asti
- Héctor Hugo Olivares Ventura (born 1944), Mexican politician from the Institutional Revolutionary Party
- Isabel Ortega Ventura (born 1954), Bolivian Aymara-Quechua politician
- Jesse Ventura (born 1951), American media personality, former politician and retired professional wrestler
- José Ramón Machado Ventura, M.D. (born 1930), Cuban revolutionary and politician, the First Vice President of the Council of State
- Julián Ventura Valero (born 1966), Mexican diplomat, who currently serves as Deputy Secretary of Foreign Affairs of Mexico

== Religion ==
- Battista de Ventura (died 1492), Italian Roman Catholic Bishop of Avellino e Frigento
- Gioacchino Ventura (dei Baroni) di Raulica (1792–1861), Italian Roman Catholic pulpit orator, patriot, philosopher and writer
- Luigi Ventura (born 1944), Italian Roman Catholic apostolic nuncio to France since 2009
- Moses Ventura (called also Ventura of Tivoli and Ventura of Jerusalem), rabbi of Silistria, Bulgaria, in the latter half of the 16th century

== Sport ==
=== Association football (soccer) ===
- Andrew da Silva Ventura (born 2001), Brazilian football goalkeeper
- Andrey da Silva Ventura (born 1993), Brazilian football goalkeeper
- Carlos Eduardo Ventura (born 1974), Brazilian retired football forward or right-winger
- Denis Ventúra (born 1995), Slovak football midfielder
- Elsa Margarida Meira Ventura, Portuguese football midfielder
- Felipe Ventura dos Santos (born 1984), Brazilian footballer who plays as a goalkeeper for Uberlândia Esporte Clube, known as Felipe
- Gian Piero Ventura (born 1948), Italian football manager and former player
- Hugo Ventura Ferreira Moura Guedes (born 1988), Portuguese football goalkeeper
- Iñaki Astiz Ventura (born 1983), Spanish football central defender
- Jair Zaksauskas Ribeiro Ventura (born 1979), known as Jair Ventura, Brazilian retired football forward
- João Pedro Ventura Medeiros (born 1994), Portuguese footballer
- Joaquín Alonso Ventura (born 1956), retired Salvadoran football player
- Lucas de Souza Ventura (born 1998), simply known as Nonoca, Brazilian professional football midfielder
- Marlon Ventura Rodrigues (born 1986), or simply Marlon, Brazilian central defender
- Robert Costa Ventura (born 1994), Spanish football central defender
- Zé Ventura (born 1996), Angolan football midfielder

=== Other sports ===
- Antoni Reig Ventura (born 1932), Spanish Escala i corda Valencian pilota variant player
- Elys Saguil-Ventura (born 2001), New Zealand tennis player
- Francisco "Paco" C. Ventura, one of the pioneers in establishing motor racing in the Philippines in the 1960s
- František Ventura (1894-1969), Czech equestrian
- Hamilton Ventura da Conceicao (born 1983), Brazilian amateur boxer
- Héctor Ventura (born 1944), Mexican former field hockey player
- Kristoffer Ventura (born 1995), Norwegian professional golfer
- Orlando Ventura (born 1948), Mexican former field hockey player
- Reinaldo Miguel Silva Ventura (born 1978), Portuguese roller hockey player
- Robbie Ventura (born 1971), American former professional racing cyclist
- Robin Ventura (born 1967), American former professional baseball third baseman and manager
- Santiago Ventura Bertomeu (born 1980), retired tennis player from Spain
- Vince Ventura (1917–2001), American professional baseball left fielder
- Yordano Ventura (1991–2017), Dominican professional baseball pitcher

== Other people ==
- Gastone Ventura (1906-1981), Italian aristocrat
- Gilberto Ventura Ceballos (born 1975), Dominican serial killer
- Guglielmo Ventura (1249/50–c.1322), Italian merchant, public official and chronicler of Asti
- Jean-Baptiste Ventura (1794–1858), Italian soldier, mercenary in India and early archaeologist of the Punjab region of the Sikh Empire
- Joaquín Ferrándiz Ventura (born 1963), an incarcerated Spanish abductor, rapist and (later) serial killer
- Manuel Mateus Ventura (1921-2018), Brazilian biophysicist, biochemist, and educator
- Roberto Ventura (born 1957), Uruguayan neuropsychologist, psychiatrist, activist, musician, author and professor
- Santiago Ventura Morales (born 1968), Mexican social worker
