= Staveren =

Staveren may refer to:

- Van Staveren, a Dutch surname
- Stavoren, previously Staveren, Netherlands
- Siege of Staveren (1399–1411), see Frisian freedom
- Stavoren railway station, called Staveren from 1943 to 1979

== See also ==
- Staverden, Netherlands
- Stavern, Germany
