= Juan Calderón =

Juan Calderón may refer to:

- Juan Calderón (field hockey) (born 1947), Mexican field hockey player
- Juan José Calderón (born 1991), Mexican footballer
