= Eduardo Anderson =

Eduardo Anderson may refer to:

- Eduardo Anderson (field hockey) (born 1950), Argentine field hockey player
- Eduardo Anderson (footballer) (born 2001), Panamanian football defender
- Eduardo Belmont Anderson, Peruvian businessman
