= Arlin =

The name Arlin may refer to:

- Arlin Godwin, American electronic musician and filmmaker
- Arlin Horton, founder of Pensacola Christian College
- Arlin Adams (1921–2015), American judge
- Arlín Ayoví (born 1979), Ecuadorian football player
- Bernard Arlin (born 1942), French field hockey player
- Georg Årlin (1916–1992), Swedish actor
- Georges Arlin(1902–1992), French field hockey player
- Harold Arlin (1895–1986), American engineer and broadcaster
- Steve Arlin (1945–2016), American baseball player
