= Héctor Bustamante =

Héctor Bustamante may refer to:

- Héctor Bustamante (field hockey)
- Héctor Bustamante (footballer)
