= Van Staveren =

Van Staveren is a Dutch toponymic surname, meaning either "from Stavoren" or "from Staverden". Notable people with the surname include:

- Cornelis van Staveren (1889–1982), Dutch Olympic sailor
- Heiko van Staveren (born 1942), Dutch field hockey player
- Herman van Staveren (1849–1930), New Zealand rabbi
- Jan Adriaensz van Staveren (1614–1669), Dutch painter
- Petra van Staveren (born 1966), Dutch Olympic swimmer
