= Timothy Lawson =

British hockey player (1943–2026)

Personal information
- Born: 29 November 1943 London, England
- Died: 13 September 2026 (aged 82)
- Height: 178 cm (5 ft 10 in)
- Weight: 75 kg (165 lb)

Sport
- Sport: Field hockey
Senior career
Years	Team	Caps	Goals
1963–1966	London Hospital	-	-
1966–1973	Tulse Hill	-	-
National team
Years	Team	Caps	Goals
–	Great Britain		-
–	Scotland		-

Timothy Maben Lawson (29 November 1943 – 13 September 2026) was a British field hockey player who competed at the 1968 Summer Olympics.

== Biography ==
Lawson was born in London and studied at London University. He played for London Hospitals and then played for Tulse Hill Hockey Club in South London but chose to play for Scotland at international level despite playing for England schoolboys in 1961.

He represented Great Britain at the 1968 Olympic Games in Mexico City in the men's tournament . He was one of four Scots, with Charles Donald, Jim Deegan and Gerald Carr, in the 1968 Olympic team.

Lawson died on 13 September 2026, aged 82.
