= Jahangir Butt =

Pakistani field hockey player (1943–2021)

- Jahangir Butt by Ahmet Abdulaziz

Personal information
- Nationality: (United Kingdom) British Indian (1943-1947) (Pakistan) Pakistani (1947-2021)
- Born: 17 April 1943 Gujranwala, British India
- Died: 7 September 2021 (aged 78) Karachi, Pakistan

Sport
- Country: Pakistan
- Sport: Field hockey
Medal record
Men's field hockey
Representing Pakistan
Olympic Games
Gold medal – first place	1968 Mexico City	Team competition
Silver medal – second place	1972 Munich	Team competition
Hockey World Cup
Gold medal – first place	1971 Barcelona	Team
Asian Games
Silver medal – second place	1966 Bangkok	Team competition
Gold medal – first place	1970 Bangkok	Team competition

Jahangir Butt (17 April 1943 – 7 September 2021) was a Pakistani field hockey player. He was born in Gujranwala, Punjab, British India. He won a gold medal at the 1968 Summer Olympics in Mexico City, and a silver medal at the 1972 Summer Olympics in Munich.

== Career ==
Butt succeeded former Pakistani veteran field hockey player Motiullah as the left winger in the Pakistani side. He was part of the Pakistani side which clinched silver in the men’s field hockey tournament at the 1966 Asian Games and won gold with the national side in the men’s tournament at the 1970 Asian Games.

He represented Pakistan at the Olympics on two occasions in 1968 and 1972, where Pakistan clinched gold and silver respectively in the men's field hockey tournaments. He was also a key member of the national side which emerged victorious at the inaugural edition of the Men’s FIH Hockey World Cup in 1971.

He was replaced as the left winger by Shahnaz Sheikh in the Pakistan hockey team. However, Jahangir Butt continued playing as a reserve player in the team and the 1972 Munich Olympics was his last international tournament.

After his retirement from the sport, he went on to become the coach of the Pakistani Junior hockey team. Under his coaching and guidance, Pakistani Junior men’s hockey team secured historic gold at the inaugural edition of the Junior Hockey World Cup, held in 1979 in France. He also coached the national junior side to bronze medals at the 1985 Junior Hockey World Cup and 1989 Junior Hockey World Cup. During his tenure as head coach of the national youth side, Pakistan remained unbeaten for 42 consecutive international matches from 1986 to 1989 and the streak eventually came to an end with a 3- 4 loss to Australia in the semi-final of the 1989 Junior Hockey World Cup. He also served as the head coach of Pakistani national side during the 1996 Summer Olympics, where the Pakistani team placed sixth.

Outside of sports, Butt was affiliated with the Pakistan Custom Department, and retired as Superintendent of Customs.

== Honours ==
In 1971, the Government of Pakistan awarded Butt with the prestigious Tamgha-e-Imtiaz which is one of the Civil decorations of Pakistan.

== Death ==
Butt died on 7 September 2021 at the age of 78 due to brief illness and health complications.

== Gallery ==
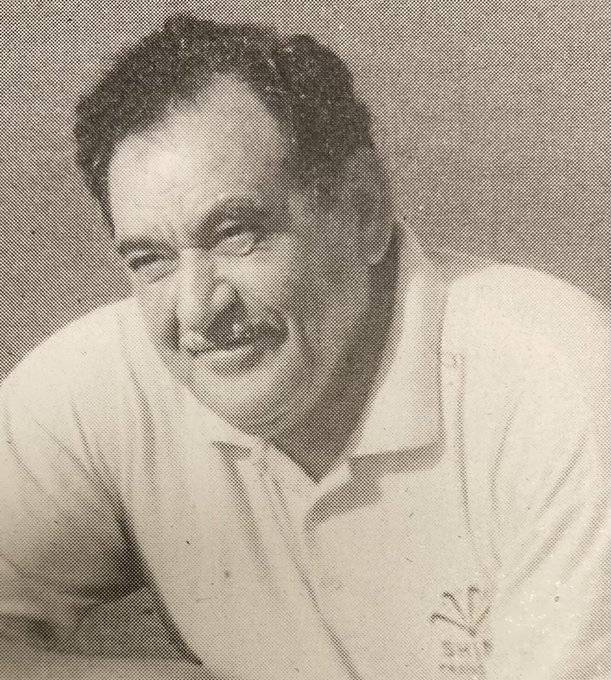
Jahangir Butt came as left-out in the Pakistan field hockey team.

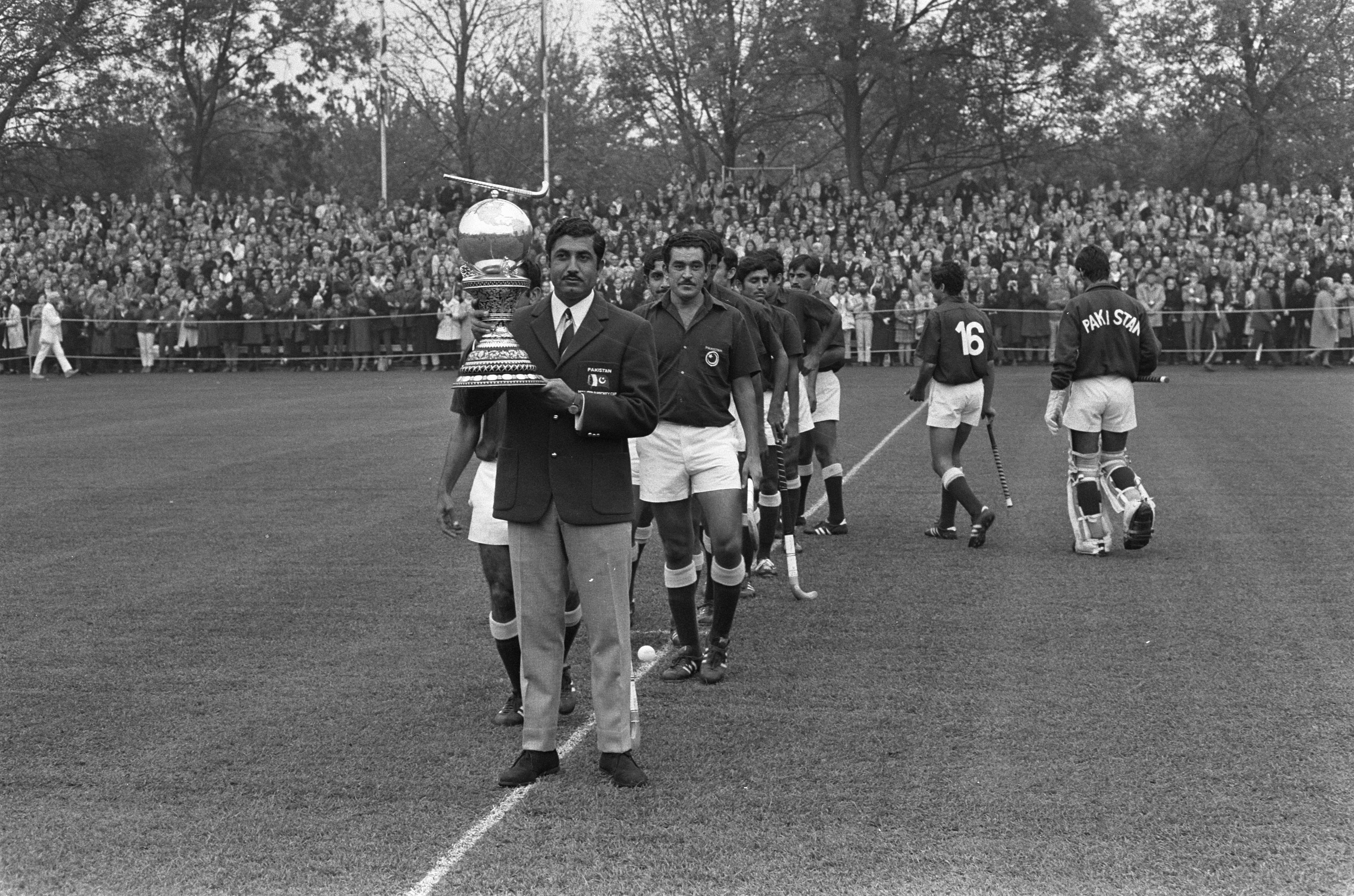
Pakistan hockey team before a match between Netherlands and Pakistan at Amstelveen on 31 October 1971. Jahangir Butt is third from front after Khalid Mahmood and Fazalur Rehman.
