= Charles Donald =

British field hockey player

Personal information
- Born: 22 July 1939 (age 87) Falkirk, Scotland
- Height: 189 cm (6 ft 2 in)
- Weight: 69 kg (152 lb)

Sport
- Sport: Field hockey
- Position: Forward
Senior career
Years	Team	Caps	Goals
1963–1971	ICI Grangemouth	-	-
National team
Years	Team	Caps	Goals
–	Great Britain		-
–	Scotland		-

Charles Buchan Donald (born 22 July 1939) is a British field hockey player who competed at the 1968 Summer Olympics.

== Biography ==
Donald played club hockey for Grangemouth Hockey Club in Scotland.

Donald represented Great Britain at the 1968 Olympic Games in Mexico City in the men's tournament. He was one of four Scots, with Gerald Carr, Jim Deegan and Timothy Lawson, in the 1968 Olympic team.
