= Gerald Carr (field hockey) =

British field hockey player (born 1938)

Personal information
- Born: 13 June 1938 (age 88) Dundee, Scotland
- Height: 176 cm (5 ft 9 in)
- Weight: 76 kg (168 lb)

Sport
- Sport: Field hockey
- Position: Defender
Senior career
| Years | Team | Caps | Goals |
| 1962–1968 | Morgan Academy FP | - | - |
| 1969–1974 | Perth | - | - |
National team
| Years | Team | Caps | Goals |
| – | Great Britain | | - |
| – | Scotland | | - |

Gerald Duncan Carr (born 13 June 1938) is a British field hockey player who competed at the 1968 Summer Olympics.

== Biography ==
Carr attended Morgan Academy and played club hockey for Morgan Former Pupils.

Carr represented Great Britain at the 1968 Olympic Games in Mexico City in the men's tournament. He was one of four Scots, with Charles Donald, Jim Deegan and Timothy Lawson, in the 1968 Olympic team.

He captained Scotland and when playing for Perth became the coach of the Scottish national team.
