= Jürgen Wein =

German hockey player

Personal information
- Nationality: German
- Born: 7 October 1938 (age 87) Hanover, Germany

Sport
- Sport: Field hockey

Jürgen Wein (born 7 October 1938) is a German field hockey player. He competed in the men's tournament at the 1968 Summer Olympics.
