= Friedrich Josten =

German field hockey player

Personal information
- Nationality: German
- Born: 14 April 1945 Duisburg, Germany
- Died: 21 July 1983 (aged 38)

Sport
- Sport: Field hockey

Friedrich Josten (14 April 1945 – 21 July 1983) was a German field hockey player. He competed in the men's tournament at the 1968 Summer Olympics.
