= Katsuhiro Yuzaki =

Japanese field hockey player

Personal information
- Nationality: Japanese
- Born: 8 January 1944 (age 82) Hokkaido, Japan

Sport
- Sport: Field hockey
Medal record
Representing Japan
Asian Games
Bronze medal – third place	1966 Bangkok	Team

Katsuhiro Yuzaki (born 8 January 1944) is a Japanese field hockey player. He competed at the 1964 Summer Olympics and the 1968 Summer Olympics.
