= Humberto Gutiérrez =

Mexican field hockey player (born 1946)

Personal information
- Born: 26 November 1946 (age 79) Oaxaca City, Mexico

Sport
- Sport: Field hockey

Humberto Gutiérrez (born 26 November 1946) is a Mexican field hockey player. He competed in the men's tournament at the 1968 Summer Olympics.
