= Jorge Tanuscio =

Argentine field hockey player

Personal information
- Born: 24 March 1947 (age 79) Buenos Aires, Argentina

Sport
- Sport: Field hockey

Jorge Tanuscio (born 24 March 1947) is an Argentine field hockey player. He competed in the men's tournament at the 1968 Summer Olympics.
