= Richard Dodrieux =

French hockey player

Personal information
- Nationality: French
- Born: 22 March 1947 (age 79) Cambrai, France

Sport
- Sport: Field hockey

Richard Dodrieux (born 22 March 1947) is a French field hockey player. He competed in the men's tournament at the 1968 Summer Olympics.
