= Komazawa Hockey Field =

Sports venue in Tokyo, Japan

Coordinates: 35.622349°N 139.663149°E

The Komazawa Hockey Field was a venue constructed in Tokyo, Japan for the field hockey competitions of 1964 Summer Olympics. Although there were three hockey fields, it marked the first time the field hockey was played in one single venue for the Summer Olympics since the 1920 Games.

== Hockey Field 1 ==
The first hockey field seated 2056 and had a playing field measuring 104.4 metres (114 yards) long by 66 metres (72 yards) wide. It also featured an electronic scoreboard. Construction occurred between December 1962 and June 1964.

== Hockey Field 2 ==
The second hockey field seated 3432 with 1542 temporary seats and had a playing field measuring 115 metres (126 yards) long by 80 metres (87 yards) wide. It also featured an electronic scoreboard. Construction occurred between December 1962 and June 1964.

== Hockey Field 3 ==
The third hockey field seated 2343 and had a playing field measuring 9,900 square metres (11,800 square yards). Construction occurred between December 1962 and September 1964.
