= Rodolfo Monti =

Argentine hockey player

Personal information
- Born: 4 February 1948 (age 78) Buenos Aires, Argentina

Sport
- Sport: Field hockey

Rodolfo Monti (born 4 February 1948) is an Argentine field hockey player. He competed in the men's tournament at the 1968 Summer Olympics.
