= Gilles Verrier =

French field hockey player

Personal information
- Nationality: French
- Born: 19 September 1947 (age 78) Saint-Germain-en-Laye, France

Sport
- Sport: Field hockey

Gilles Verrier (born 19 September 1947) is a French field hockey player. He competed in the men's tournament at the 1968 Summer Olympics.
