= David Sevilla =

Mexican field hockey player (born 1940)

David Sevilla (born 29 December 1940) is a Mexican former field hockey player who competed in the 1968 Summer Olympics and in the 1972 Summer Olympics. He was born in Mexico City.
