= Abdul Waheed (field hockey) =

Pakistani field hockey player (1936–2022)

Medal record

Men's field hockey

Representing Pakistan

Olympic Games
Gold medal – first place	1960 Rome	Team competition

Asian Games
Gold medal – first place	1962 Jakarta	Team competition
Silver medal – second place	1966 Bangkok	Team competition

Abdul Waheed (30 November 1936 – 21 February 2022), also known as Abdul Waheed Khan, born in Rajpur, Madhya Pradesh, was a Pakistani field hockey player who was a member of the country's gold medal winning 1960 Olympic Hockey team. He played center forward, and scored the first goal in the team's final game.

In September 2000, Abdul Waheed was interviewed and asked to compare Pakistan hockey in contemporary times and when they had won the 1960 Olympic gold. He said:

"When we won Olympic gold in hockey in 1960 we did not get anything in return. We would walk for miles to reach grounds and it was passion not lust that ruled our hearts."

He died in Karachi on 21 February 2022, at the age of 85.
