= Norihiko Matsumoto (field hockey) =

Japanese field hockey player

Personal information
- Nationality: Japanese
- Born: 5 March 1944 (age 82) Hiroshima, Japan

Sport
- Sport: Field hockey
Medal record
Representing Japan
Asian Games
| Bronze medal – third place | 1966 Bangkok | Team |

Norihiko Matsumoto (born 5 March 1944) is a Japanese field hockey player. He competed in the men's tournament at the 1968 Summer Olympics.
