= Noel Gutiérrez =

Mexican field hockey player (born 1950)

Noel Gutiérrez (born 9 May 1950) is a Mexican former field hockey player who competed in the 1968 Summer Olympics and in the 1972 Summer Olympics. He was born in Oaxaca City.
