= Günther Krauss =

German field hockey player

Personal information
- Nationality: German
- Born: 17 December 1940 (age 85) Mönchengladbach, Germany

Sport
- Sport: Field hockey

Günther Krauss (born 17 December 1940) is a German field hockey player. He competed in the men's tournament at the 1968 Summer Olympics.
