= José Antonio Prud'homme =

Mexican hockey player (born 1947)

Personal information
- Born: 30 October 1947 (age 78) Mexico City, Mexico

Sport
- Sport: Field hockey

José Antonio Prud'homme (born 30 October 1947) is a Mexican field hockey player. He competed in the men's tournament at the 1968 Summer Olympics.
