= Michel Windal =

French hockey player

Personal information
- Nationality: French
- Born: 1 January 1948 (age 78) Sucy-en-Brie, France

Sport
- Sport: Field hockey

Michel Windal (born 1 January 1948) is a French former field hockey player. He competed in the men's tournament at the 1968 Summer Olympics.
