= Enrique Filoteo =

Mexican field hockey player (born 1948)

Enrique Filoteo (born 9 September 1948) is a Mexican former field hockey player who competed in the 1968 Summer Olympics and in the 1972 Summer Olympics.
