= City Park Hockey Stadium =

Field hockey stadium in Nairobi, Kenya

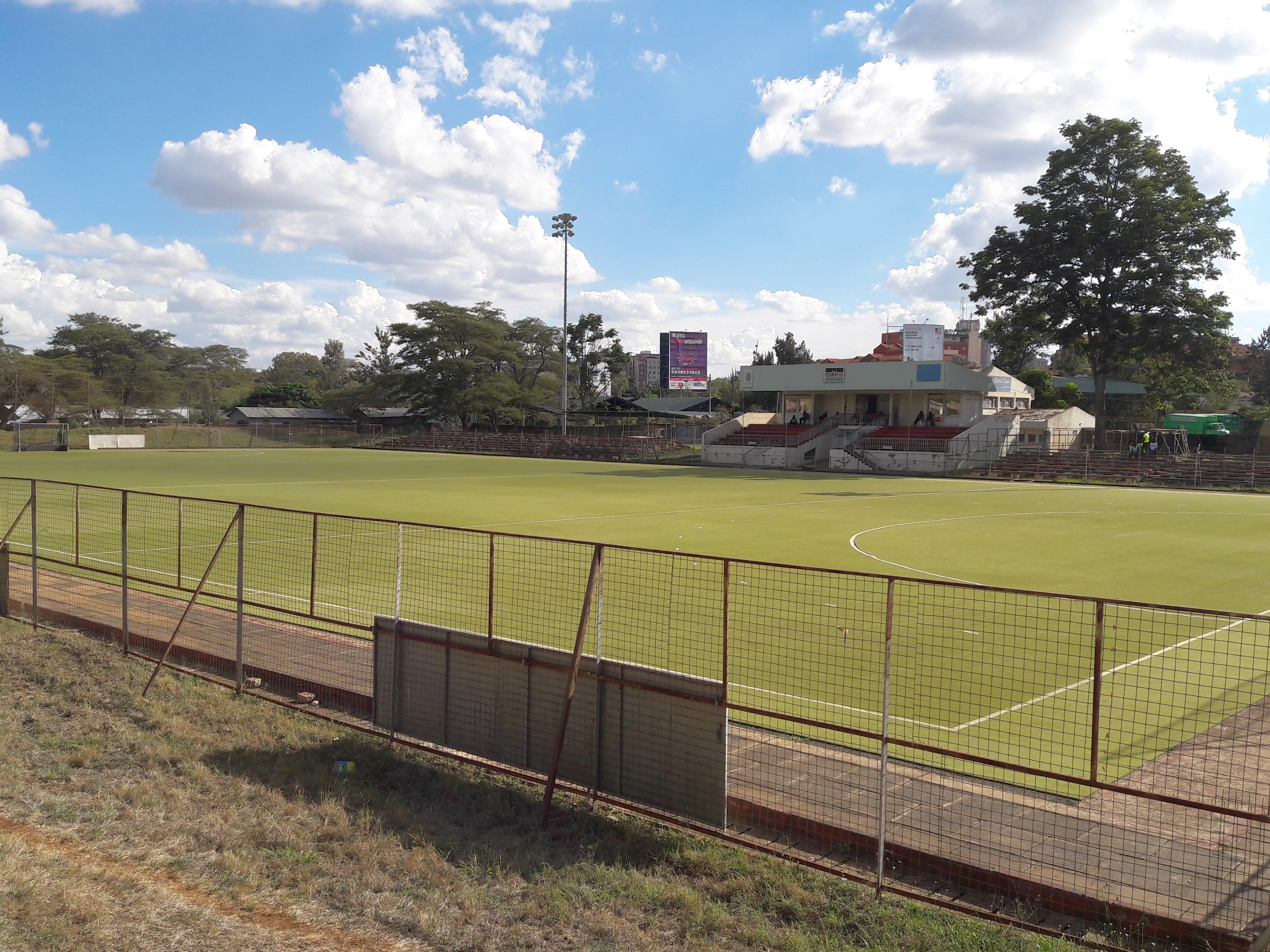
- Interactive map of City Park Hockey Stadium
- Location: Nairobi, Nairobi County; Kenya
- Coordinates: 1.26061°S 36.82754°E
- Surface: Astroturf

The City Park Hockey Stadium is a field hockey stadium in Nairobi, Kenya.

The Kenya men's and women's national hockey teams use the stadium for trainings and matches, in preparation for international tournaments.
