= Rafael Camiña =

Spanish field hockey player (born 1944)

Personal information
- Nationality: Spanish
- Born: 16 August 1944 (age 81) Guecho, Spain

Sport
- Sport: Field hockey

Rafael Camiña (born 16 August 1944) is a Spanish field hockey player. He competed in the men's tournament at the 1968 Summer Olympics.
