= Yukio Kamimura =

Japanese field hockey player

Personal information
- Nationality: Japanese
- Born: 30 August 1947 (age 78) Shizuoka, Japan

Sport
- Sport: Field hockey
Medal record
Representing Japan
Asian Games
Bronze medal – third place	1966 Bangkok	Team

Yukio Kamimura (born 30 August 1947) is a Japanese field hockey player. He competed in the men's tournament at the 1968 Summer Olympics.
