= Carlos Kenny =

Argentine field hockey player

Personal information
- Born: 19 July 1950 (age 75) Buenos Aires, Argentina

Sport
- Sport: Field hockey

Carlos Kenny (born 19 July 1950) is an Argentine field hockey player. He competed in the men's tournament at the 1968 Summer Olympics.
