= Jean-Claude Merkes =

French hockey player

Personal information
- Nationality: French
- Born: 27 December 1940 Bordeaux, France
- Died: 16 August 2024 (aged 83)

Sport
- Sport: Field hockey

Jean-Claude Merkes (27 December 1940 – 16 August 2024) was a French field hockey player. He competed in the men's tournament at the 1968 Summer Olympics.
