= Jorge Suárez (field hockey) =

Argentine hockey player

Personal information
- Born: 15 May 1942 (age 83) Buenos Aires, Argentina

Sport
- Sport: Field hockey

Jorge Suárez (born 15 May 1942) is an Argentine field hockey player. He competed in the men's tournament at the 1968 Summer Olympics.
