= Adán Noriega =

Mexican field hockey player (born 1947)

Adán Noriega (born 30 September 1947) is a Mexican former field hockey player who competed in the 1968 Summer Olympics and in the 1972 Summer Olympics. He was born in Mexico City.
