= Javier Varela =

Mexican field hockey player (born 1940)

Javier Varela (born 27 September 1940) is a Mexican former field hockey player who competed in the 1968 Summer Olympics and in the 1972 Summer Olympics. He was born in Mexico City.
