= Philippe Vignon =

French hockey player

Personal information
- Nationality: French
- Born: 28 September 1942 (age 83) Neuilly-sur-Seine, France

Sport
- Sport: Field hockey

Philippe Vignon (born 28 September 1942) is a French field hockey player. He competed in the men's tournament at the 1968 Summer Olympics.
