= Jean-Paul Petit =

French hockey player

Personal information
- Nationality: French
- Born: 10 August 1945 (age 80) Lyon, France

Sport
- Sport: Field hockey

Jean-Paul Petit (born 10 August 1945) is a French field hockey player. He competed in the men's tournament at the 1968 Summer Olympics.
