= Jorge Giannini =

Argentine hockey player

Personal information
- Born: 30 April 1948 (age 77) Buenos Aires, Argentina

Sport
- Sport: Field hockey

Jorge Giannini (born 30 April 1948) is an Argentine retired field hockey player. He competed in the men's tournament at the 1968 Summer Olympics.
