= Marc Chapon =

French field hockey player

Personal information
- Nationality: French
- Born: 17 October 1944 (age 81) Courcelette, France

Sport
- Sport: Field hockey

Marc Chapon (born 17 October 1944) is a French field hockey player. He competed at the 1968 Summer Olympics and the 1972 Summer Olympics.
