= Alain Pascarel =

French field hockey player

Personal information
- Nationality: French
- Born: 20 March 1947 (age 79) Talence, France

Sport
- Sport: Field hockey

Alain Pascarel (born 20 March 1947) is a French former field hockey player. He competed in the men's tournament at the 1968 Summer Olympics.
