= Sebo Ebbens =

Dutch hockey player

Personal information
- Nationality: Dutch
- Born: 31 October 1945 (age 80) Groningen, Netherlands

Sport
- Sport: Field hockey

Sebo Ebbens (born 31 October 1945) is a Dutch field hockey player. He competed in the men's tournament at the 1968 Summer Olympics.
