= Stéphane Joinau =

French hockey player

Personal information
- Nationality: French
- Born: 8 April 1944 (age 82) Bordeaux, France

Sport
- Sport: Field hockey

Stéphane Joinau (born 8 April 1944) is a French field hockey player. He competed in the men's tournament at the 1968 Summer Olympics.
