= Georges Vanderhulst =

Belgian field hockey player

Personal information
- Nationality: Belgian
- Born: 15 July 1944 (age 81) Ixelles, Belgium

Sport
- Sport: Field hockey

Georges Vanderhulst (born 15 July 1944) is a Belgian former field hockey player. He competed in the men's tournament at the 1968 Summer Olympics.
