= William Hansen (field hockey) =

Belgian hockey player

Personal information
- Nationality: Belgian
- Born: 4 April 1939 (age 87) Uccle, Belgium

Sport
- Sport: Field hockey

William Hansen (born 4 April 1939) is a Belgian former field hockey player. He competed in the men's tournament at the 1968 Summer Olympics.
