= Andrew Trentham =

British field hockey player (born 1946)

Personal information
- Born: 21 December 1946 (age 79) Birmingham, England
- Height: 178 cm (5 ft 10 in)
- Weight: 79 kg (174 lb)

Sport
- Sport: Field hockey
Senior career
| Years | Team | Caps | Goals |
| 1967–1969 | Royal Navy | - | - |
National team
| Years | Team | Caps | Goals |
| – | Great Britain | | - |
| – | England | | - |

Andrew Bruce Trentham (born 21 December 1946) is a British field hockey player who competed at the 1968 Summer Olympics.

== Biography ==
Trentham was educated at Bilton Grange preparatory school, where he first played hockey and Rugby School. He joined the military and represented the Royal Navy and Combined Services at hockey.

Trentham represented Great Britain at the 1968 Olympic Games in Mexico City in the men's tournament. At the time of his Olympic appearance he was a sub-Lieutenant in the Royal Navy.
