= Armando Cicognini =

Argentine field hockey player

Personal information
- Born: 22 November 1942 (age 83) Buenos Aires, Argentina

Sport
- Sport: Field hockey

Armando Cicognini (born 22 December 1942) is an Argentine field hockey player. He competed in the men's tournament at the 1968 Summer Olympics.
