= Koh Hock Seng =

Malaysian field hockey player (1945–2026)

Personal information
- Nationality: Malaysian
- Born: 26 May 1945 Malacca City, Malacca, Straits Settlements
- Died: 12 November 2026 (aged 81)

Chinese name
- Traditional Chinese: 許福成
- Simplified Chinese: 许福成
- Hanyu Pinyin: Xǔ Fúchéng
- Hokkien POJ: Khó͘ Hok-sêng

Sport
- Sport: Field hockey

Koh Hock Seng (26 May 1945 – 12 November 2026) was a Malaysian field hockey player. He competed at the 1964 Summer Olympics and the 1968 Summer Olympics. He attended Malacca High School, where he played on the school's hockey team alongside Yang Siow Ming. Koh died on 12 November 2026, at the age of 81.
