= Gulraiz Akhtar =

Pakistani field hockey player (1943–2021)

Personal information
- Born: 2 February 1943 Rawalpindi, Punjab province, British India
- Died: 31 October 2021 (aged 78) Lahore, Pakistan
- Height: 1.72 m (5 ft 8 in)
- Weight: 61 kg (134 lb)

Sport
- Sport: Field hockey
Medal record
Men's field hockey
Representing Pakistan
Olympic Games
Gold medal – first place	1968 Mexico City	Team competition
Asian Games
Gold medal – first place	1970 Bangkok	Team competition

Gulraiz Akhtar (2 February 1943 – 1 November 2021) was a Pakistani field hockey player. He was born in Rawalpindi, Pakistan to Muhammad Amin and Amina. Although his father was a lawyer by profession, Akhtar had a humble upbringing. He was fourth among seven siblings, three brothers and four sisters. Inspired by their uncle Muhammad Naseeb, a member of Pakistan field hockey team in 1950, and Naseer Bunda, a neighbor and family friend who was also an Olympic gold medalist, all three brothers, Javed Akhtar, Pervez Akhtar and Gulraiz Akhtar started playing field hockey regularly at a local playground in Rawalpindi. One of his elder brothers, Pervez Akhtar, also became an international player for Pakistan. However, Gulraiz Akhtar shone the most, becoming Pakistan's first left-half to score a goal. His career concluded with three gold medals in international tournaments. He won his first gold medal at the 1968 Summer Olympics in Mexico City.

Gulraiz Akhtar served in Pakistan Customs before attaining retirement age. He remained active in hockey events and sometimes wrote in renowned magazines and newspapers.

He died on 31 October 2021, in Lahore, aged 78, and was buried there.
