= Adrian Maycsell =

Mexican field hockey player (born 1941)

Personal information
- Born: 26 October 1941 (age 84) Mexico City, Mexico

Sport
- Sport: Field hockey

Adrian Maycsell (born 26 October 1941) is a Mexican field hockey player. He competed in the men's tournament at the 1968 Summer Olympics.
