= Shigeo Kaoku =

Japanese field hockey player

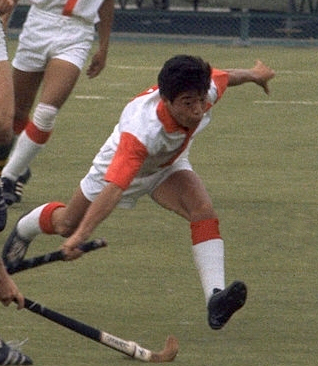
- Shigeo Kaoku at the 1964 Olympics

Personal information
- Born: 29 July 1942 (age 83) Osaka, Japan
- Height: 1.64 m (5 ft 5 in)
- Weight: 56 kg (123 lb)

Sport
- Sport: Field hockey
Medal record
Representing Japan
Asian Games
Bronze medal – third place	1966 Bangkok	Team

Shigeo Kaoku (加奥 成雄, born 29 July 1942) is a retired Japanese field hockey player, who won a bronze medal at the 1966 Asian Games. He competed at the 1964 and 1968 Olympics and finished in 7th and 13th place, respectively.
