= Gastone Ventura =

Italian Navy Vice-admiral (1907–1981)

Count Gastone Ventura
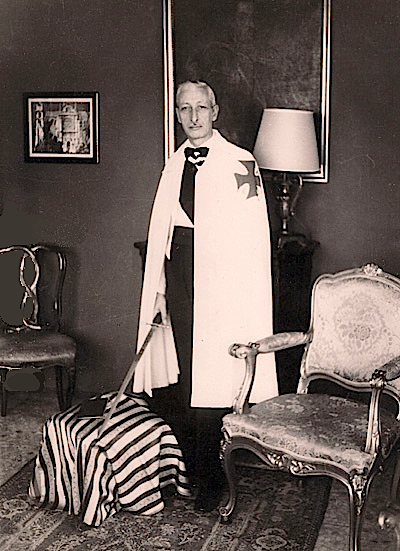
- Born: 29 October 1907; Treviso, Italy
- Died: 28 July 1981 (aged 73)
- Occupation: Vice-Admiral of the Italian Navy
- Known for: Grand Master of the Italian Ordine Martinista (1967-1981); Sovereign Grand Hierophant General of the Rites of Misraïm and Memphis – zenith of Venice; Regent of the Grand Priory of Italy of the Supernus Ordo Equester Templi

Gastone Ventura (29 October 1907 - 28 July 1981), also known with his Initiatic name Aldebaran, was the Grand Master of the Italian Ordine Martinista (1967 – 1981) and Sovereign Grand Hierophant General of the Rites of Misraïm and Memphis – zenith of Venice. He was also member of the Supreme Council of the French Ordre Martiniste and Regent of the Grand Priory of Italy of the Supernus Ordo Equester Templi (Templar Order).

== Biography ==
Born in Treviso, Italy, on the 29 October 1907 at 5:30am, Count Gastone Ventura descended from an aristocratic family of Parma, which during Napoleonic times took up residence in Venice and there he spent most of his life.

He was a Vice-Admiral of the Italian Navy involved in the Second World War.

A prolific author, he performed historical and esoteric research and published fundamental texts, referring to the Rite of Misraïm and Memphis, as well as the Ordine Martinista [Martinist Order] over which he presided. According to him, Traditional Gnosis is based on the universal principles of metaphysics.

== Books ==
Beside having translated into Italian some works of the well-known esotericist Jean Mallinger, Gastone Ventura wrote the following books (in Italian):

- Templari e Templarismo
- Cagliostro, un uomo del suo tempo
- I riti massonici di Misraïm e Memphis
- Miti e riti nel pensiero tradizionale
- Tutti gli uomini del martinismo
- Il mistero del rito sacrificale
- La terra delle quattro giustizie
- Agartha e Sambhala e la Glazialkosmogonie
- Considerazioni storico tradizionali sul mito della Regnia di Saba
- Il mondo alla rovescia
- Influenza delle dottrine dell'Antico Egitto sull'esoterismo ebraico-cristiano
- La Tetraktis pitagorica
- Note storiche sul Martinismo
- Tecniche della Via Cardiaca
