= Manuel Fernández (field hockey) =

Mexican field hockey player (born 1948)

Manuel Fernández (born 6 March 1948) is a Mexican former field hockey player who competed in the 1968 Summer Olympics and in the 1972 Summer Olympics. He was born in Mexico City.
