= David Wilman =

British field hockey player (1934–2020)

Personal information
- Born: 19 December 1934 Yeadon, England
- Died: 9 August 2020 (aged 85)
- Height: 175 cm (5 ft 9 in)
- Weight: 68 kg (150 lb)

Sport
- Sport: Field hockey
- Position: Full-back
Senior career
Years	Team	Caps	Goals
1959–1960	Bradford	-	-
1962–1969	Cambridge City	-	-
National team
Years	Team	Caps	Goals
–	Great Britain		-
–	England		-

David Wilman (19 December 1934 – 9 August 2020) was a British field hockey player who competed at the 1964 Summer Olympics and the 1968 Summer Olympics.

== Biography ==
Wilman studied at the University of Leeds and represented the Universities Athletic Union hockey team in January 1957. At county level he played for Yorkshire.

Wilman represented Great Britain at the 1964 Olympic Games in Tokyo. At the time of his first Olympic selection he played club hockey for Cambridge City Hockey Club. When Wilman represented Great Britain at the 1968 Olympic Games in Mexico City he was still with the Cmabridge City team.

He left Cambridge City in 1969 after gaining a job at Aberystwyth University.

Wilman died on 9 August 2020, at the age of 85.
