= Robert Villaseñor =

Mexican field hockey player (born 1944)

Personal information
- Born: 24 July 1944 (age 81) Mexico City, Mexico

Sport
- Sport: Field hockey

Robert Villaseñor (born 24 July 1944) is a Mexican field hockey player. He competed in the men's tournament at the 1968 Summer Olympics.
