= Masashi Onda =

Japanese hockey player

Personal information
- Nationality: Japanese
- Born: 27 June 1939 (age 86) Okinawa, Japan

Sport
- Sport: Field hockey

Masashi Onda (born 27 June 1939) is a Japanese field hockey player. He competed in the men's tournament at the 1968 Summer Olympics.
