= Jorge Bada =

Mexican hockey player (born 1944)

Personal information
- Born: 17 August 1944 (age 81) Mexico City, Mexico

Sport
- Sport: Field hockey

Jorge Bada (born 17 August 1944) is a Mexican field hockey player. He competed in the men's tournament at the 1968 Summer Olympics.
