= Tippy de Lanoy Meijer =

Dutch field hockey player

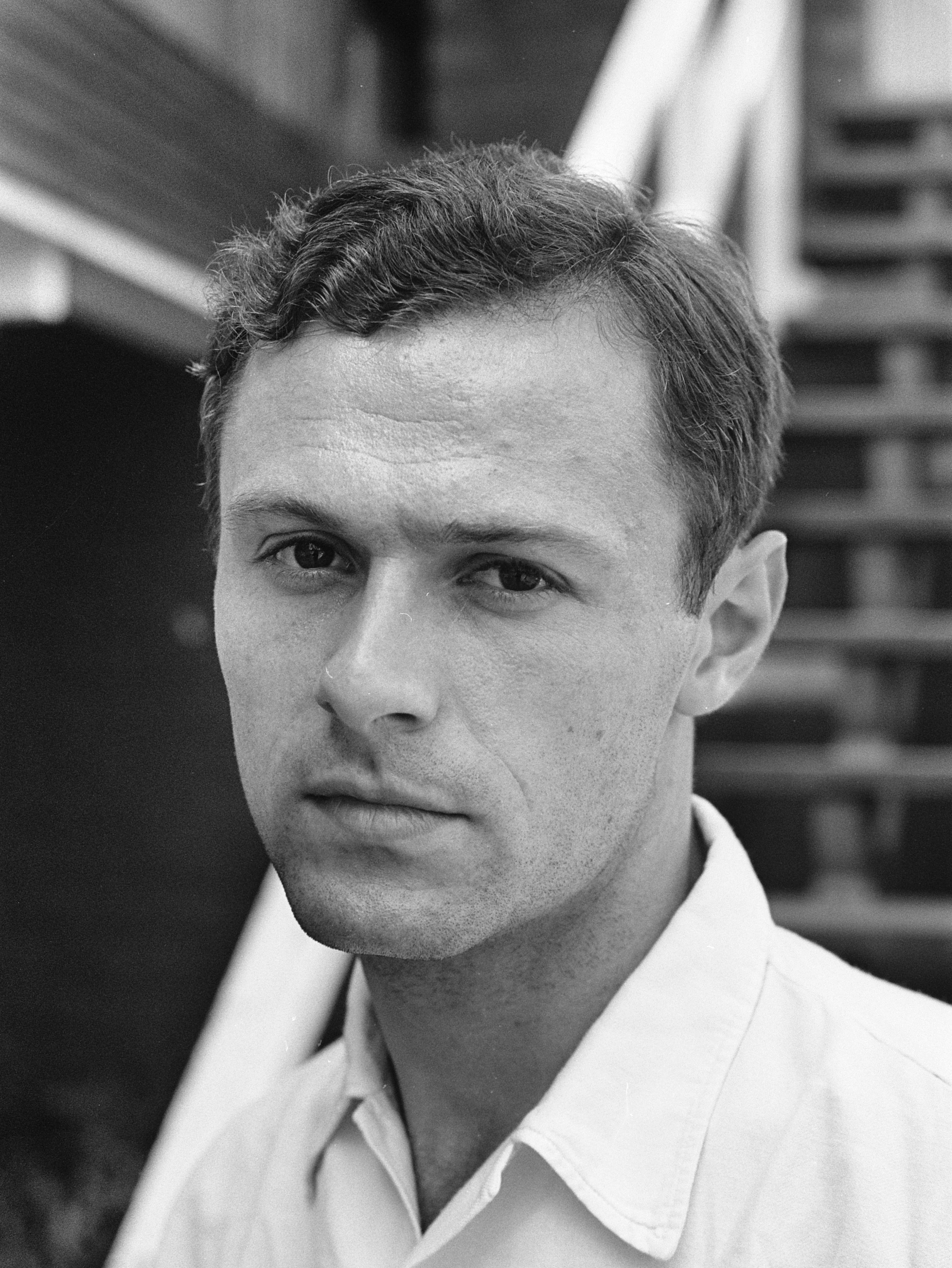
- Tippy de Lanoy Meijer in 1969

Personal information
- Born: 16 November 1943 (age 82) Vianen, the Netherlands
- Height: 1.69 m (5 ft 7 in)
- Weight: 68 kg (150 lb)

Sport
- Sport: Field hockey
- Club: Laren

Charles François "Tippy" de Lanoy Meijer (born 16 November 1943) is a retired field hockey player from the Netherlands. He competed at 1968 Summer Olympics, where his team finished in fifth place.
