= Shozo Nishimura =

Japanese field hockey player

Personal information
- Nationality: Japanese
- Born: 26 September 1945 (age 80) Hokkaido, Japan

Sport
- Sport: Field hockey
Medal record
Representing Japan
Asian Games
Bronze medal – third place	1966 Bangkok	Team

Shozo Nishimura (born 26 September 1945) is a Japanese field hockey player. He competed in the men's tournament at the 1968 Summer Olympics.
