= Roger Flood =

British hockey player

Personal information
- Born: 15 August 1939 (age 86) Bristol, England
- Height: 176 cm (5 ft 9 in)
- Weight: 68 kg (150 lb)

Sport
- Sport: Field hockey
- Position: Goalkeeper
Senior career
Years	Team	Caps	Goals
1963–1974	Old Silhillians	-	-
National team
Years	Team	Caps	Goals
–	Great Britain		-
–	England		-

Roger Newton Flood (born 15 August 1939) is a British field hockey player who competed at the 1968 Summer Olympics.

== Biography ==
Flood played club hockey for Old Silhillians. He represented Warwickshire at county level and became England's number one goalkeeper.

Flood represented Great Britain at the 1968 Olympic Games in Mexico City in the men's tournament.
