= Guglielmo Ventura =

Italian merchant and historian (1249–c. 1322)

Guglielmo Ventura, sometimes anglicized William Ventura (1249/50–c. 1322), was a merchant, public official and chronicler of Asti. He is believed to have been an ancestor of the later chronicler Secondino Ventura.

Guglielmo's chronicle informs us that he had turned fifty by 1300 and sixty by 1310. His birth therefore fell in 1249 or 1250. He fought for the commune of Asti during its war against Charles of Anjou. During the Battle of Cossano in 1274 he was captured. He was later freed and took part in further campaigns. In 1290 he fought in the war against William VII of Montferrat. He became merchant of spices, was a member of the bourgeois popolo and held several important municipal offices. In 1300, he visited Rome during the first Jubilee. He made up a will in 1310 and this is the last record of him independent of his chronicle.

Guglielmo wrote a chronicle of the city, the Memoriale de rebus gestis civium astensium et plurium aliorum, (Note: "Memorial of Things Done by the Citizens of Asti and Many Others") covering the years 1261–1325, although the last few years were added by another hand. The Memoriale is written in ungrammatical Latin prose and divided into 114 chapters. His sources were his own memory, oral reports and the municipal archives. The Memoriale is sometimes called the Chronicon Astense, but it must be distinguished from the earlier and shorter Chronicon Astense parvum. The Memoriale is especially valuable today for its length, detail and general accuracy, although Guglielmo uncritically records traditions and legends.
