= Ted Salmon =

New Zealand field hockey player

Edwin Benjamin Salmon (born 19 December 1943) is a former field hockey player from New Zealand who competed at two Olympic Games.

Salmon was born in Whangārei. At the 1968 Summer Olympics in Mexico City he was a member of the Olympic team that finished seventh and at the 1972 Summer Olympics in Munich he was a member of the team that finished ninth.
