= Field hockey at the 1966 Asian Games =

- Venue: Thephasadin Stadium
- Location: Bangkok, Thailand
- Dates: 12–19 December
- Teams: 8

Medalists
gold medal	India (1st title)
silver medal	Pakistan
bronze medal	Japan

Field hockey was contested for men only at the 1966 Asian Games in Bangkok, Thailand.

India won its first gold medal by defeating the two-time defending champions Pakistan 1–0 after extra time in the final. Japan won its first medal by defeating Malaysia 1–0 in the bronze medal match.

== Medalists ==
Event	Gold	Silver	Bronze
Men	India; A. L. Frank; Balbir Singh Grewal; Haripal Kaushik; Balbir Singh Kular; Balbir Singh Kullar; Mohinder Lal; Shankar Lakshman; John Peter; Dharam Singh; Gurbux Singh; Harbinder Singh; Harmik Singh; Inder Singh; Jagdeep Singh; Jagjit Singh; Prithipal Singh; Tarsem Singh; Noel Toppo	Pakistan; Muhammad Ashfaq; Laeeq Ahmed; Muhammad Akhtar; Saeed Anwar; Tariq Aziz; Khizar Nawaz Bajwa; Jahangir Butt; Munir Dar; Abdul Hamid; Jahangir Khan; Khalid Mahmood; Muhammad Asad Malik; Riazuddin Moghal; Tariq Niazi; Fazal-ur-Rehman; Muhammad Rashid; Abdul Waheed; Khwaja Zakauddin	Japan; Hiroshi Fujishima; Seiji Hashimoto; Yukitoshi Hata; Nobuo Ide; Yukio Kamimura; Shigeo Kaoku; Akio Kudo; Norihiko Matsumoto; Shozo Nishimura; Satokazu Otsuka; Katsumi Shirato; Takashi Sugiura; Hiroyuki Takagi; Akio Takashima; Akihito Wada; Minoru Yoshimura; Katsuhiro Yuzaki; Tsuneya Yuzaki

== Draw ==
The draw for hockey competition was held on 5 December 1966.

Group A

- Pakistan
- Japan
- Hong Kong
- Thailand

Group B

- India
- Malaysia
- South Korea
- Ceylon

== Results ==
=== Preliminary round ===
==== Group A ====
Pos	Team	Pld	W	D	L	GF	GA	GD	Pts	Qualification
1	Pakistan	3	2	1	0	18	0	+18	5	Semi-finals
2	Japan	3	2	1	0	5	0	+5	5	Semi-finals
3	Hong Kong	3	1	0	2	2	6	−4	2	
4	Thailand (H)	3	0	0	3	0	19	−19	0	

(H) Hosts

12 December 1966

Pakistan	0–0	Japan

12 December 1966

Hong Kong	2–0	Thailand

13 December 1966

Pakistan	5–0	Hong Kong

13 December 1966

Japan	4–0	Thailand

15 December 1966

Pakistan	13–0	Thailand

15 December 1966

Japan	1–0	Hong Kong

==== Group B ====
Pos	Team	Pld	W	D	L	GF	GA	GD	Pts	Qualification
1	India	3	3	0	0	5	0	+5	6	Semi-finals
2	Malaysia	3	1	1	1	2	1	+1	3	Semi-finals
3	South Korea	3	1	0	2	1	3	−2	2	
4	Ceylon	3	0	1	2	0	4	−4	1	

12 December 1966

South Korea	1–0	Ceylon

12 December 1966

India	1–0	Malaysia

13 December 1966

Malaysia	2–0	South Korea

13 December 1966

India	3–0	Ceylon

14 December 1966

India	1–0	South Korea
	Report

14 December 1966

Malaysia	0–0	Ceylon

=== Consolation round ===
5–8th place semi-finals
16 December
Hong Kong	1
Ceylon	3
16 December
South Korea	1
Thailand	0

5th place
17 December
Ceylon	1
South Korea	0

==== 5–8th place semi-finals ====
16 December 1966

Hong Kong	1–3	Ceylon

16 December 1966

South Korea	1–0	Thailand

==== 5th place match ====
17 December 1966

Ceylon	1–0	South Korea

=== Medal round ===
Semi-finals
16 December
Pakistan	5
Malaysia	1
16 December
India	3
Japan	0

Gold medal match
19 December
Pakistan	0
India (a.e.t.)	1
Bronze medal match
19 December
Malaysia	0
Japan	1

==== Semi-finals ====
16 December 1966

Pakistan	5–1	Malaysia

16 December 1966

India	3–0	Japan

==== Bronze medal match ====
19 December 1966

Malaysia	0–1	Japan
	Report	Yoshimura 8'

==== Gold medal match ====
19 December 1966

Pakistan	0–1 (a.e.t.)	India
	Report	Balbir Singh 90'

== Final standings ==
1. India
2. Pakistan
3. Japan
4. Malaysia
5. Ceylon
6. South Korea
7. Hong Kong
8. Thailand
