= Malcolm Read =

British field hockey player

Personal information
- Born: 8 January 1941 (age 85) Singapore

Sport
- Sport: Field hockey
- Position: Forward
Senior career
| Years | Team | Caps | Goals |
| 1964–1966 | St Thomas' Hospital | - | - |
| 1966–1970 | Dulwich | - | - |
National team
| Years | Team | Caps | Goals |
| – | Great Britain | | - |
| – | England | | - |

Malcolm Trevor Fitzwalter Read (born 8 January 1941) is a British field hockey player who competed at the 1968 Summer Olympics.

== Biography ==
Read born in Singapore, won a blue for Cambridge University. He played club hockey for Dulwich Hockey Club and represented Kent at county level.

Read represented Great Britain at the 1968 Olympic Games in Mexico City in the men's tournament.
