= Roberto Ventura =

Uruguayan scientist, activist, musician and author (born 1957)

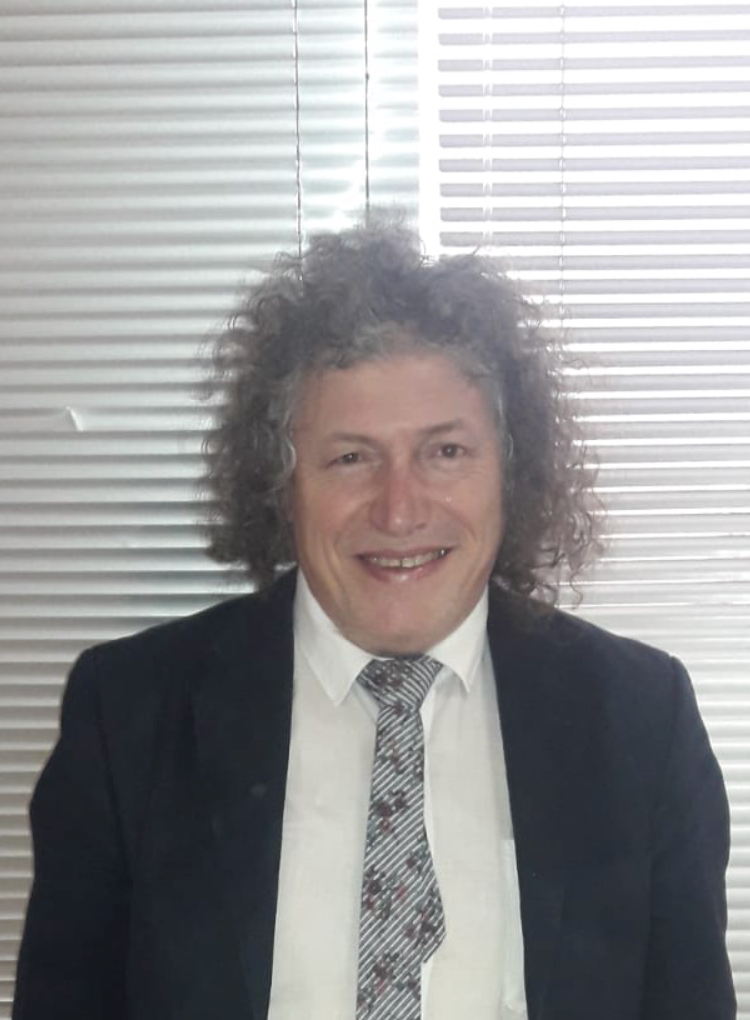
- Roberto Ventura in 2018.
- Born: Roberto Leonel Ventura Brignoli; 19 February 1957 (age 69); Montevideo, Uruguayan
- Education: University of the Republic
- Occupations: neurology, neuropsiology, psychiatrist, professor, researcher
- Children: Paulina
- Parent(s): Luigia Brignoli; Alfredo Valmori Ventura

Roberto Ventura (born 19 February 1957, in Montevideo) is a Uruguayan neuropsychologist, psychiatrist, activist, musician, author and professor.

== Biography ==
Ventura was born in Montevideo, the son of Italian musician Luigia Brignoli and Alfredo Valmori Ventura. He studied neurology, neuropsychology and psychiatry at the Universidad de la República, and later became a professor at that university. He is currently Associate Professor of Neuropsychology and the Chair of Neurology and Biological Bases of Human Behavior of the Faculty of Psychology, Universidad de la República.

He is cofounder of the Interdisciplinary Group for the study of the frontal lobe of the Hospital de Clínicas of Montevideo. He was also a member of the Parkinson and Abnormal Movement section of the Institute of Neurology at the Faculty of Medicine of the University of the Republic, president and founder of the Asociación Uruguaya de Alzheimer y Similares (Uruguayan Association of Alzheimer's and Similar, AUDAS), a nonprofit organization created on in 1991. The foundation was carried out in the British Hospital of Montevideo.

He is also an Honorary Member of the Association for the Fight against Alzheimer's Disease of Argentina, President of the Neuropsychiatry Society of Uruguay and, cofounder and vice president of the Uruguayan Psychogeriatric Society. He conducted studies with the independent research group in neuropsychiatry on prosopagnosia, presented the final work discovering which were: "The thirty faces most known by the Uruguayan population", Whose utility is its application in patients who have prosopagnosia for brain injury. This work received the first prize in the Congreso Latinoamericano de Neuropsiquiatría (Latin American Congress of Neuropsychiatry) in Buenos Aires. He works at La Asociación, as Head of the Neurology Service where he is also in charge of the Polyclinic of Family Support for Patients with Cognitive and Behavioral Disorders. Ventura plays celtic music, blues and rock in the bands of Fermata and Malpertuis, where he plays the western concert flute.

He is an international professor, author of numerous publications and books. His book "400 respuestas a 400 preguntas sobre la demencia" (400 answers to 400 questions about dementia) published in 2007, in several Latin American countries, helped many families in Iberoamerica.

== Books ==
- 2025, Semiología de la demencia, (ISBN 978-9915-9807-1-3)
- 2006, 400 respuestas a 400 preguntas sobre la demencia, (ISBN 9974-7941-1-0)
- 2007, 400 respuestas a 400 preguntas sobre la demencia, Volumen II guía para la familia.
- 2008, Temas de neuropsiquiatría.(ISBN 978-9974-96-517-1)
- 2009, Avances de neuropsiquiatría Volumen I y II.
- 2011, Enfermedad de Parkinson y otras enfermedades relacionadas (ISBN 978-9974-98-078-5)
- 2012, Enfermedad de Parkinson y otras enferemedades extrapiramidales (coauthored ISBN 978-607-7743-49-1)
- 2018, El Alzehimer en Iberoamerica (coauthored).

My major effort is education at a social level, and at a medical level to improve the understanding of the clinical level of the manifestation of the disease to reach a better clinical diagnostic reasoning, to a better early recognition of the symptoms, to achieve a rapid and accurate clinical diagnosis and be able to help the patient and the family better and earlier.

— Roberto Ventura, August 2008.
