= Wolfgang Müller (field hockey) =

German field hockey player (born 1938)

Personal information
- Nationality: German
- Born: 18 February 1938 (age 88) Hanover, Germany

Sport
- Sport: Field hockey

Wolfgang Müller (born 18 February 1938) is a German field hockey player. He competed in the men's tournament at the 1968 Summer Olympics.
