= Juan José Alvear =

Spanish field hockey player (born 1941)

Personal information
- Full name: Juan José Alvear Calleja
- Nationality: Spanish
- Born: 25 September 1941 (age 84) Madrid, Spain

Sport
- Sport: Field hockey

Juan José Alvear Calleja (born 25 September 1941) is a Spanish field hockey player. He competed in the men's tournament at the 1968 Summer Olympics.
