= Eduardo Guelfand =

Argentine field hockey player

Personal information
- Born: 5 April 1947 (age 79) Buenos Aires, Argentina

Sport
- Sport: Field hockey

Eduardo Guelfand (born 5 April 1947) is an Argentine field hockey player. He competed in the men's tournament at the 1968 Summer Olympics.
