= Orlando Ventura =

Mexican field hockey player (born 1948)

Orlando Ventura (born 20 May 1948) is a Mexican former field hockey player who competed in the 1968 Summer Olympics and in the 1972 Summer Olympics. He was born in Oaxaca City.
