= Harnahal Singh Sewa =

Malaysian field hockey player (born 1946)

Personal information
- Nationality: Malaysian
- Born: 29 October 1946 (age 79)

Sport
- Sport: Field hockey

Harnahal Singh Sewa (born 29 October 1946) is a Malaysian field hockey player. He competed at the 1968 Summer Olympics and the 1972 Summer Olympics.
