= Héctor Bustamante (field hockey) =

Mexican field hockey player (born 1949)

Héctor Bustamante (born 7 September 1949 in Mexico City) is a Mexican former field hockey player who competed in the 1968 Summer Olympics.
