= Jan Piet Fokker =

Dutch field hockey player

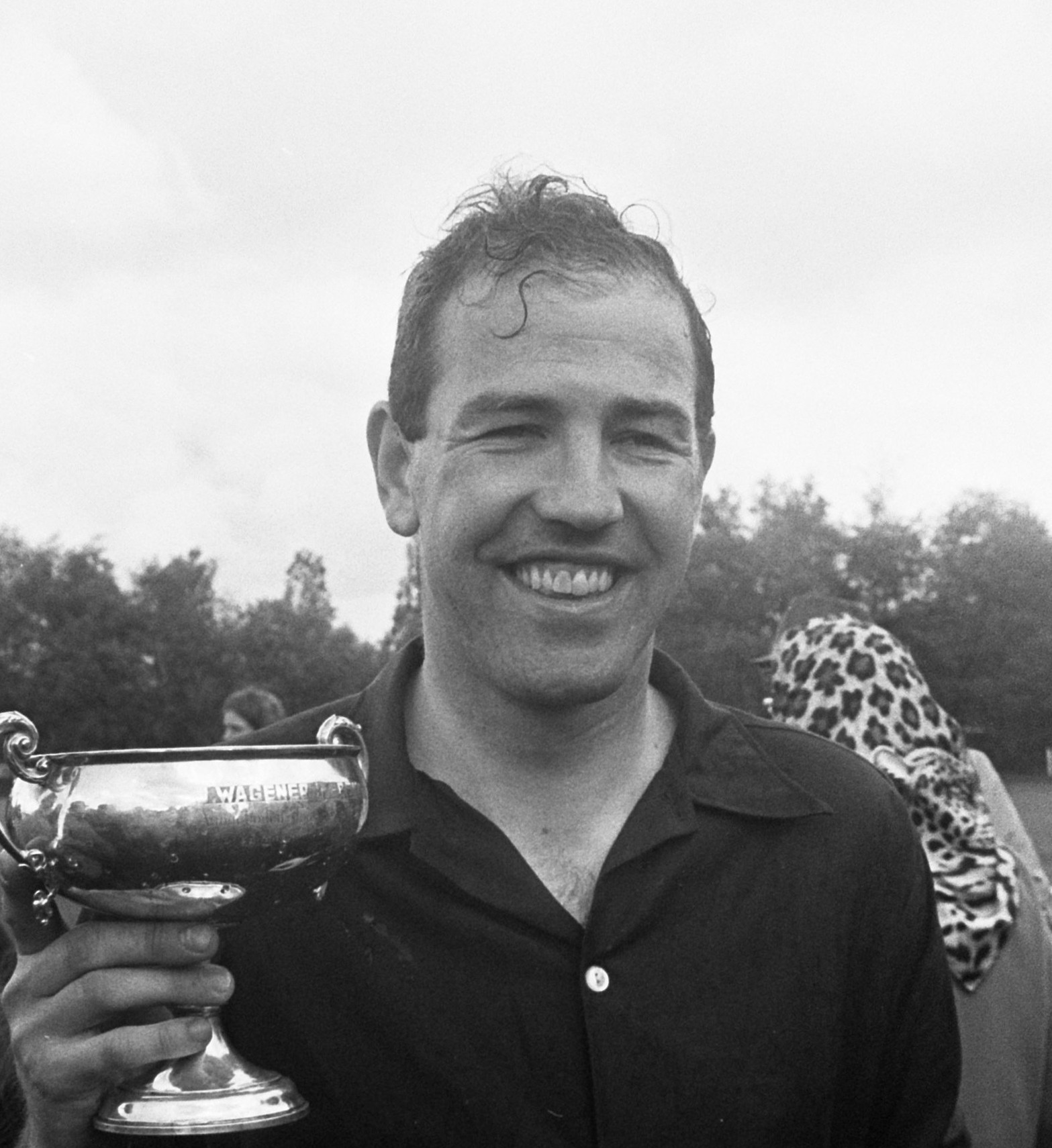
- Jan Piet Fokker in 1969

Personal information
- Born: 19 January 1942 Bandung, Indonesia
- Died: 29 May 2010 (aged 68) Bilthoven, the Netherlands
- Height: 1.87 m (6 ft 2 in)
- Weight: 85 kg (187 lb)

Sport
- Sport: Field hockey
- Club: HC Bloemendaal; Laren

Johan Pieter "Jan Piet" Fokker (19 January 1942 – 29 May 2010) was a field hockey player from the Netherlands. He competed at the 1964 and 1968 Summer Olympics, where his team finished in seventh and fifth place, respectively. In 1968 he was the team captain and scored two goals in eight games.

Fokker started playing for Laren in 1958, and in 1962 was selected for the national team. During his career he won the national title twice and scored five goals in 86 international matches. After graduating with a degree in economics in 1971 he worked at SHV Makro, eventually becoming its executive board member. He retired in 1998, after SHV sold the company to Metro AG.
