= Heiko van Staveren =

Dutch field hockey player

Personal information
- Nationality: Dutch
- Born: 21 October 1942 (age 83) Breukelen, Netherlands

Sport
- Sport: Field hockey

Heiko van Staveren (born 21 October 1942) is a Dutch field hockey player. He competed in the men's tournament at the 1968 Summer Olympics.
