= Kuldip Singh Uijeer =

Malaysian field hockey player (born 1943)

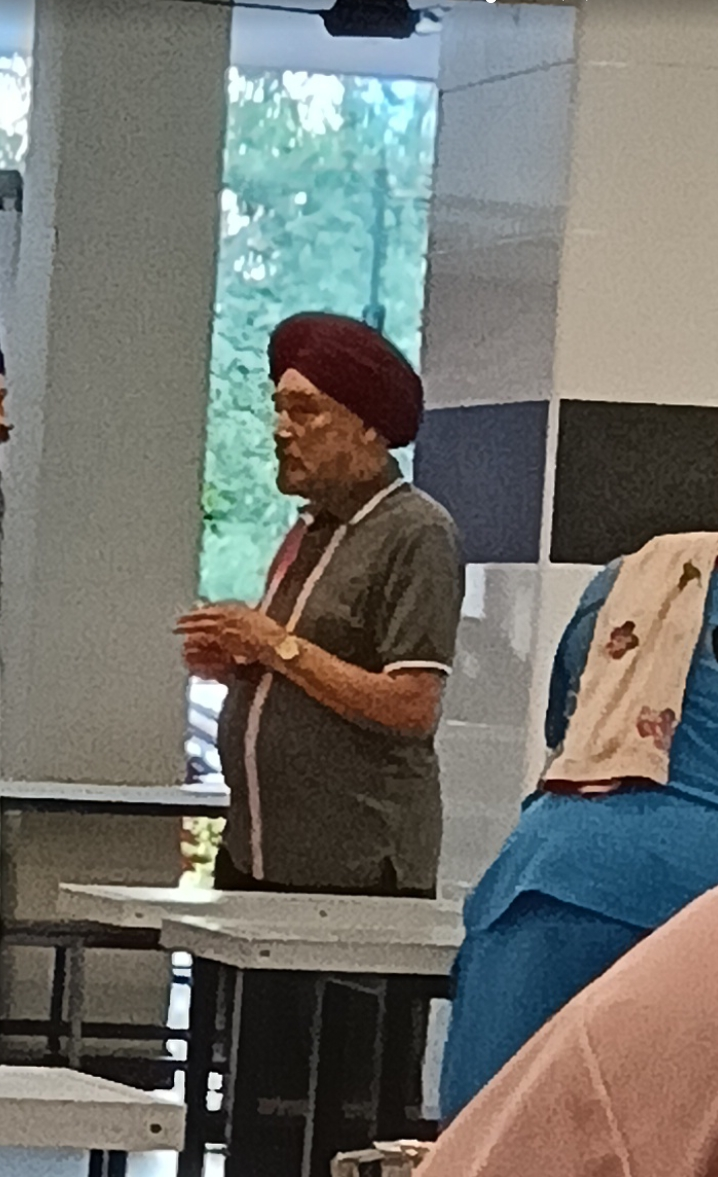
- Uijeer in 2025

Personal information
- Full name: Kuldip Singh Badh son of Uijeer Singh Badh
- Nationality: Malaysian
- Born: 16 May 1943 (age 82)
- Employer(s): National Electricity Board and TNB Malaysia

Sport
- Sport: Field hockey
- Team: National Electricity Board and Malaysia

Kuldip Singh Uijeer (born 16 May 1943) is a Malaysian field hockey player. He competed in the men's tournament at the 1968 Summer Olympics.
