= Tariq Niazi =

Pakistani field hockey player

Medal record

Men's field hockey

Representing Pakistan

Olympic Games
Silver medal – second place	1964 Tokyo	Team competition
Gold medal – first place	1968 Mexico City	Team competition

Asian Games
Gold medal – first place	1962 Jakarta	Team competition
Silver medal – second place	1966 Bangkok	Team competition

Tariq Masood Niazi (15 March 1940 – 20 April 2008) was a Pakistani field hockey player who represented Pakistan at the highest level during the 1960s. He was born in Mianwali, Pakistan. Niazi completed his graduation from the University of Karachi and later earned a post-graduate degree in International Relations, also from the University of Karachi.

He played domestic hockey for Pakistan International Airlines (PIA) and was selected for the Pakistan national hockey team in 1961. Niazi represented Pakistan at the 1962 Asian Games in Jakarta, where the team won the gold medal. He was part of the squad at the 1964 Summer Olympics in Tokyo, winning a silver medal, and at the 1966 Asian Games in Bangkok, where Pakistan again secured a silver medal. His international career reached its peak at the 1968 Summer Olympics in Mexico City, where Pakistan won the gold medal. Tariq Niazi also served as vice-captain of the national team in 1968.

In recognition of his playing career, he was awarded the Golden Star by the Pakistan Hockey Federation in 1969 as the best retiring player. After retirement, Tariq Niazi moved into coaching and served as coach of the Egyptian national hockey team from 1970 to 1973, and later as national coach from 1974 to 1978. Mianwali’s Municipal Hockey Stadium was renamed Tariq Niazi Hockey Stadium in Niazi's honor. Niazi died on 20 April 2008 of a cardiac arrest.
