= Motiullah Khan =

Pakistani field hockey player (1938–2022)

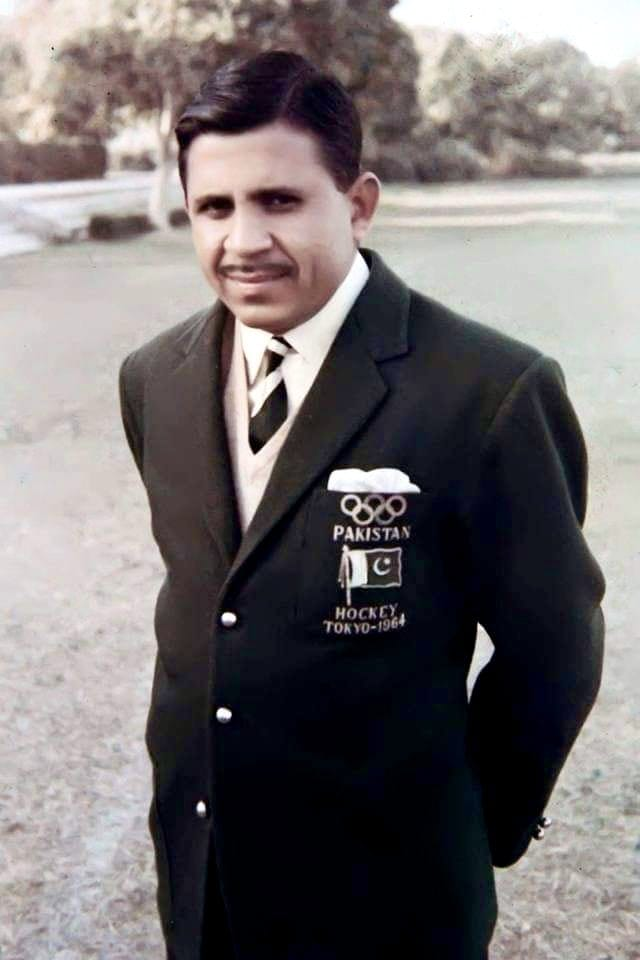
- Olympian Motiullah Khan

Personal information
- Born: 31 January 1938 Bahawalpur, State of Bahawalpur, British India
- Died: 12 August 2022 (aged 84) Bahawalpur, Punjab, Pakistan

Sport
- Sport: Field hockey
- Position: Left-out
Medal record
Men's field hockey
Representing Pakistan
Olympic Games
Gold medal – first place	1960 Rome	Team competition
Silver medal – second place	1956 Melbourne	Team competition
Silver medal – second place	1964 Tokyo	Team competition
Asian Games
Gold medal – first place	1962 Jakarta	Team competition

Motiullah Khan, alternatively spelled Mutiullah Khan (31 January 1938 – 12 August 2022), was a Pakistani field hockey player. He won gold medal at the 1960 Summer Olympics, Pakistan's first Olympic gold, and silver medals at the 1956 and 1964 Summer Olympics. He was awarded the Tamgha-e-Imtiaz by the Government of Pakistan in 1963. The international hockey stadium in Bahawalpur, Motiullah Hockey Stadium, is named after him. He played over 68 international matches and scored 13 goals for his country.

Samiullah Khan and Kaleemullah Khan, the famous Olympic hockey players, are both his relatives.
