= Eduardo Anderson (field hockey) =

Argentine field hockey player

Personal information
- Born: 20 August 1950 (age 75) Buenos Aires, Argentina

Sport
- Sport: Field hockey

Eduardo Anderson (born 20 August 1950) is an Argentine field hockey player. He competed in the men's tournament at the 1968 Summer Olympics.
