= Bernard Arlin =

French field hockey player

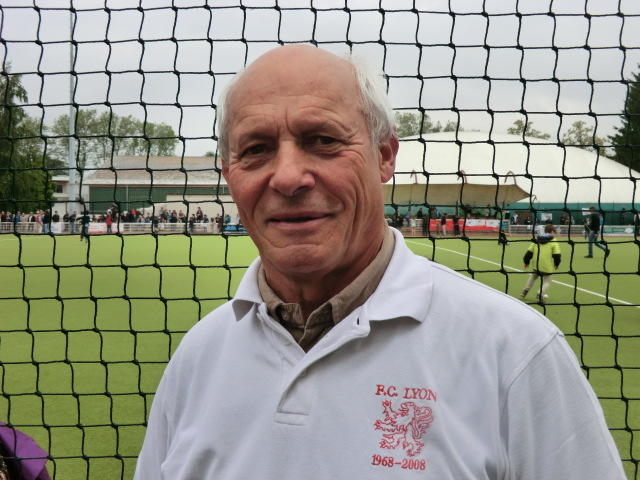
- Bernard Arlin in 2013

Personal information
- Nationality: French
- Born: 25 July 1942 (age 83) Lyon, France

Sport
- Sport: Field hockey

Bernard Arlin (born 25 July 1942) is a French field hockey player. He competed in the men's tournament at the 1968 Summer Olympics.
