= Shamuganathan Jeevajothy =

Malaysian field hockey player (born 1948)

Personal information
- Nationality: Malaysian
- Born: 14 November 1948 (age 77)

Sport
- Sport: Field hockey

Shamuganathan Jeevajothy (born 14 November 1948) is a Malaysian field hockey player. He competed in the men's tournament at the 1968 Summer Olympics.
