= Loong Whey Pyu =

Malaysian field hockey player (born 1945)

Personal information
- Nationality: Malaysian
- Born: 24 April 1945 (age 80)

Sport
- Sport: Field hockey

Loong Whey Pyu (born 24 April 1945) is a Malaysian field hockey player. He competed in the men's tournament at the 1968 Summer Olympics.
