= Koh Chong Jin =

Malaysian field hockey player (born 1947)

Personal information
- Nationality: Malaysian
- Born: 1 August 1947 (age 78)

Sport
- Sport: Field hockey

Koh Chong Jin (born 1 August 1947) is a Malaysian field hockey player. He competed in the men's tournament at the 1968 Summer Olympics.
