= Arie de Keyzer =

Dutch field hockey player

Personal information
- Full name: Arie Leendert de Keyzer
- Nationality: Dutch
- Born: 1 June 1943 (age 82) Breda, Netherlands

Sport
- Sport: Field hockey

Arie Leendert de Keyzer (born 1 June 1943) is a Dutch former field hockey player. Originally from Breda, he played for the Breda Hockey and Bandy Club (BH & BC Breda). Selected for the Netherlands men's national field hockey team, de Keyzer represented his country at the 1964 Summer Olympics and the 1968 Summer Olympics. He scored three goals during the field hockey tournament at the 1968 Olympics, all in a pool game against Argentina played in Mexico City. Together with Bruce Judge (New Zealand), Harbinder Singh (India) and Muhammad Ashfaq (Pakistan), de Keyzer was voted as one of the players of the tournament.
