= Francis Belavantheran =

Malaysian field hockey player (born 1948)

Personal information
- Nationality: Malaysian
- Born: 5 June 1948 (age 77)

Sport
- Sport: Field hockey

Francis Belavantheran (born 5 June 1948) is a Malaysian field hockey player. He competed at the 1968 Summer Olympics, the 1972 Summer Olympics and the 1976 Summer Olympics.
