= Juan Calderón (field hockey) =

Mexican field hockey player (born 1947)

Juan Calderón (born 5 October 1947) is a Mexican former field hockey player who competed in the 1968 Summer Olympics and in the 1972 Summer Olympics. He was born in Mexico City.
