= Ameen-ud-Din bin Mohamed Ibrahim =

Malaysian field hockey player (1947–2015)

Personal information
- Nationality: Malaysian
- Born: 20 November 1947
- Died: 10 November 2015 (aged 67)

Sport
- Sport: Field hockey

Ameen-ud-Din bin Mohamed Ibrahim (20 November 1947 – 10 November 2015) was a Malaysian field hockey player. He competed in the men's tournament at the 1968 Summer Olympics.
