= Naseer Bunda =

Pakistani field hockey player

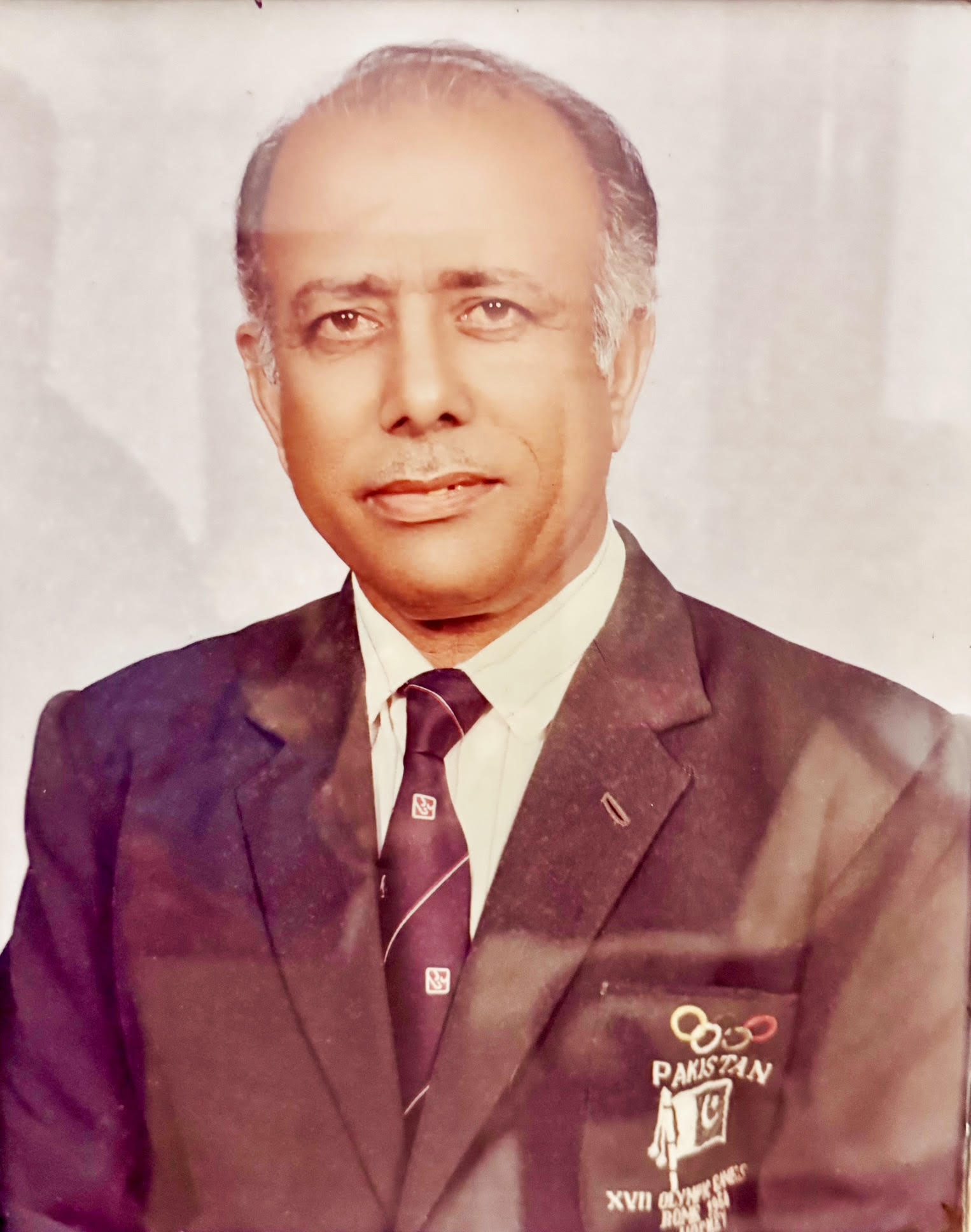

Personal information
- Full name: Naseer Ahmed Bunda
- Born: 15 May 1932 Rawalpindi, Punjab, British India
- Died: 20 March 1993 (aged 60) Rawalpindi, Pakistan
Medal record
Men's field hockey
Representing Pakistan
Olympic Games
Gold medal – first place	1960 Rome	Team competition
Silver medal – second place	1956 Melbourne	Team competition
Asian Games
Gold medal – first place	1962 Jakarta	Team competition

Naseer Ahmed Bunda (15 May 1932 – 20 March 1993) was a field hockey player from Pakistan. He was born in Rawalpindi.

== Family ==
Naseer Bunda was born into a large family with ten brothers and one sister. Sporting talent ran in the household, his brother Rasheed Ahmed was also an accomplished athlete, representing both the Pakistan national hockey team and PIA. The legacy continued into the next generation, as two of Naseer Bunda’s sons, Nasir Naseer and Asif Naseer, followed in their father’s footsteps and played for both the Pakistan national team and Pakistan Customs.

== Honours and legacy ==
Naseer Bunda enjoyed a distinguished international hockey career marked by major tournament appearances and historic achievements. He made his national debut in 1954 during the West German team’s tour of Pakistan. He later represented Pakistan at the Melbourne Olympics in 1956, the Asian Games in Tokyo in 1958, the Rome Olympics in 1960, and the Malaya–Singapore tour in 1961. At the 1962 Asian Games in Jakarta, he secured two gold medals.

At the Rome Olympics in 1960, he scored the only goal in the hockey final against India, a strike that earned Pakistan its first Olympic gold medal in the sport and cemented his “immortal status in Pakistan’s sports history.”

Across his international career, Bunda scored 43 goals in 44 appearances for Pakistan. At the domestic level, he captained the Attock Oil Company hockey club, further strengthening his leadership reputation.

In recognition of his contributions to sport, he received several prestigious honours, including the President’s Award for Pride of Performance, the Helms Award from the United States, and the Sitara-e-Imtiaz from Pakistan. He was formally awarded the Pride of Performance by the Government of Pakistan in 1962.

His enduring impact on Pakistani hockey is commemorated through the Naseer Bunda Hockey Stadium in Islamabad, named in his honour.
