= Staverden =

- City
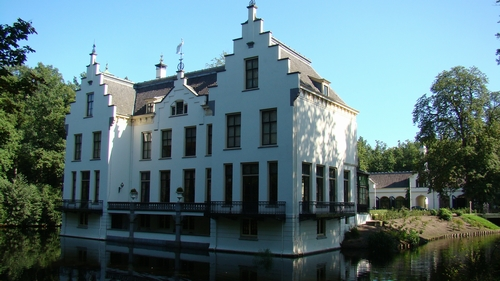
- Staverden Castle
- Interactive map of Staverden
- Coordinates: 52°17′11″N 5°44′17″E
- Country: Netherlands
- Province: Gelderland
- Municipality: Ermelo

Population (2016)
  - Total: 30
  - Density: 13/km^{2} (34/sq mi)

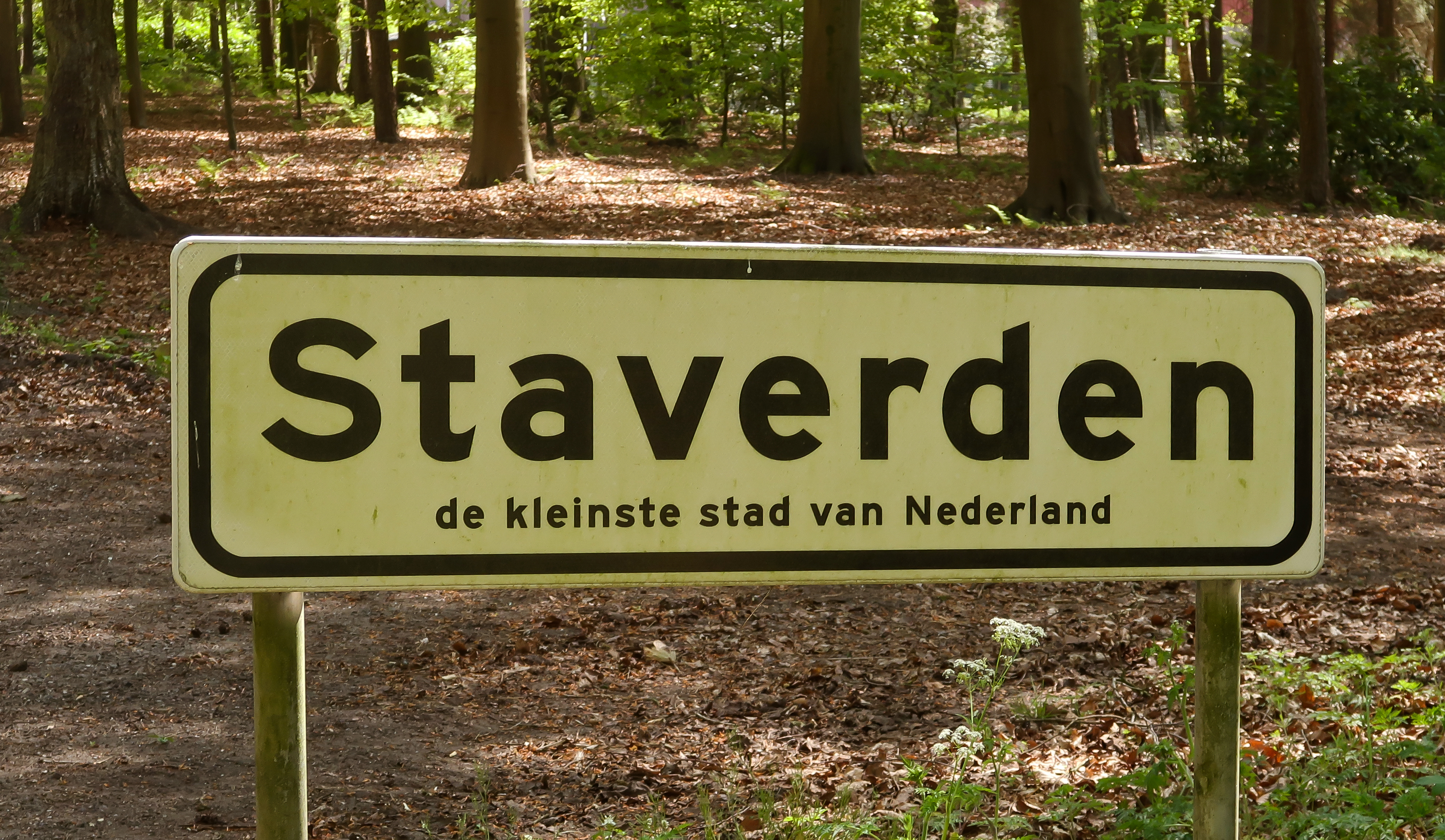
Staverden, the smallest city in the Netherlands

Staverden is a city in the Dutch province of Gelderland. It is located in the municipality of Ermelo, about 5 kilometres east of Ermelo. It received city rights in 1298. With 30 inhabitants, it is today the smallest place with that traditional title in the Netherlands. It is also officially the smallest city in the Low Countries.
