= Héctor Ventura =

Mexican field hockey player (born 1944)

Héctor Ventura (born 7 September 1944) is a Mexican former field hockey player who competed in the 1968 Summer Olympics and in the 1972 Summer Olympics. He was born in Oaxaca City.
