= Khalid Mahmood (field hockey) =

Pakistani field hockey player (1941–2026)

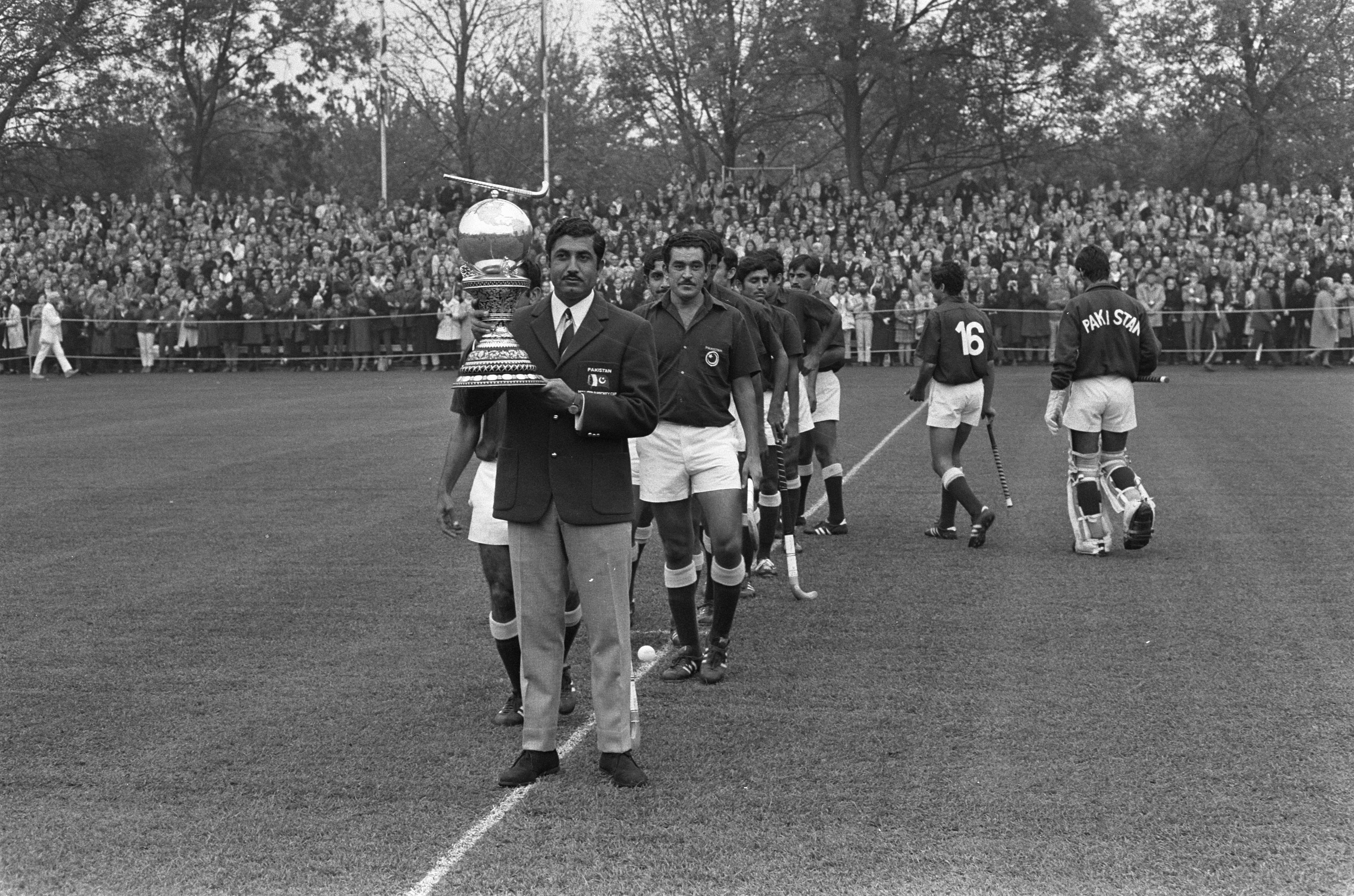
- Captain Pakistan field hockey team Khalid Mahmood carrying hockey world cup before a match between Pakistan and Netherlands at Amstelveen on 31 October 1971.

Personal information
- Nationality: (United Kingdom) British Indian (1941–1947) (Pakistan) Pakistani (1947–2026)
- Born: 28 December 1941 Jhelum, Punjab Province, British India
- Died: 10 September 2026 (aged 84) Lahore, Punjab province, Pakistan
- Resting place: Raja Graveyard, Faisalabad, Punjab province, Pakistan

Sport
- Sport: Field hockey
- Position: Right-out
Medal record
Representing Pakistan
Olympic Games
Silver medal – second place	1964 Tokyo	Team competition
Gold medal – first place	1968 Mexico City	Team competition
Hockey World Cup
Gold medal – first place	1971 Barcelona	Team competition
Asian Games
Silver medal – second place	1966 Bangkok	Team competition
Gold medal – first place	1970 Bangkok	Team competition

Khalid Mahmood (Urdu: خالد محمود; 28 December 1941 – 10 September 2026) was a Pakistani field hockey player who captained the national team. He was born in Punjab. He won a gold medal at the 1968 Summer Olympics in Mexico City, and a silver medal at the 1964 Summer Olympics in Tokyo.

Mahmood died on 10 September 2026, at the age of 84. His funeral prayer was offered at Raja Ghulam Rasool Nagar in Faisalabad, on 11 September. He was later buried at his family graveyard.
