= Yang Siow Ming =

Malaysian field hockey player (born 1946)

Personal information
- Nationality: Malaysian
- Born: 1 July 1946 (age 79) Kuala Kangsar, Malayan Union
- Spouse: Thong Nyok Seen (m. 1972; died 2020)

Chinese name
- Traditional Chinese: 楊修明
- Simplified Chinese: 杨修明
- Hanyu Pinyin: Yáng Xiūmíng

Sport
- Sport: Field hockey

Yang Siow Ming (born 1 July 1946) is a Malaysian field hockey player. He competed at the 1968 Summer Olympics and the 1972 Summer Olympics.

Yang was born in Kuala Kangsar to schoolteacher parents. The family later moved to Malacca, where Yang attended Malacca High School. He began his hockey career there, representing the school even as a first-former. He played other sports while in high school, and was named the school's Sportsman of the Year for five years running, but eventually dropped his other sports to focus on field hockey. He did not try out for the Malaysian team for the 1964 Olympics as he was sitting for his Sijil Pelajaran Malaysia examinations that year, but two years later he represented his country at the 1966 Asian Games. There, he met his wife-to-be Thong Nyok Seen, a daughter of then-Olympic Council of Malaysia general secretary Thong Poh Nyen. Yang went on to represent Malaysia again at the 1968 Summer Olympics and the 1971 Southeast Asian Peninsular Games. After the 1972 Summer Olympics, he retired from sport and married Thong, with whom he had one son, Eugene. He took up teaching positions at Kajang High School in Selangor and then at Victoria Institution in Kuala Lumpur, and in 1996 became director of coaching at the Malaysian Hockey Federation, a position which he held until 1999. He was inducted into the Olympic Council of Malaysia's Hall of Fame in 2015. As of 2020, he lived with his son and daughter-in-law, and had been diagnosed with Parkinson's disease.
