= Jim Deegan =

British hockey player (born 1933)

Personal information
- Born: 6 November 1933 (age 92) Edinburgh, Scotland
- Height: 179 cm (5 ft 10 in)
- Weight: 73 kg (161 lb)

Sport
- Sport: Field hockey
- Position: centre half
Senior career
Years	Team	Caps	Goals
1960–1965	Hampstead & Westminster	-	-
1965–1974	Surbiton	-	-
National team
Years	Team	Caps	Goals
–	Great Britain		-
–	England		-

James Frederick A. Deegan (born 6 November 1933) is a British field hockey player. He competed at the 1964 Summer Olympics and the 1968 Summer Olympics.

== Biography ==
Deegan born in Edinburgh, played his club hockey in England for Hampstead and Westminster Hockey Club and county hockey for Middlesex. Deegan also played for the RAF hockey team while serving with the Royal Air Force and played for Portrush in Northern Ireland when stationed there at Ballykelly in 1954. Although born in Scotland, Deegan chose to play for England at international level.

While at Hampstead and Westminster, he represented Great Britain at the 1964 Olympic Games in Tokyo. Deegan switched clubs to join Surbiton Hockey Club and it was with them that he made his second Olympic appearance for Great Britain at the 1968 Olympic Games in Mexico City.
