= Pakistan at the Olympics =

- IOC code: PAK
- NOC: Pakistan Olympic Association
- Website: www.nocpakistan.org
- Medals Ranked 78th: Gold 4 Silver 3 Bronze 4 Total 11

Summer appearances
- 1948; 1952; 1956; 1960; 1964; 1968; 1972; 1976; 1980; 1984; 1988; 1992; 1996; 2000; 2004; 2008; 2012; 2016; 2020; 2024

Winter appearances
- 2010; 2014; 2018; 2022; 2026

Other related appearances
- India (1900–pres.); Bangladesh (1984–pres.)

The Pakistan Olympic Association was created in 1948, while the Pakistan Sports Board was established in 1962.

Pakistan first participated in the Olympic Games in 1948 in London, and has sent athletes to compete in every Summer Olympic Games since then, except for the American-led boycott of the 1980 Summer Olympics in the Soviet Union. It has participated in every Winter Olympic Games since the 2010 Vancouver Olympics, when alpine skier Mohammad Abbas became the first Pakistani athlete to qualify for a Winter Olympics event.

Pakistani athletes have won a total of 11 medals, all in the Summer Olympics, including 4 gold medals. Pakistan's men's field hockey team won eight medals in the nine games it participated in between 1956 and 1992. This included a run of 5 consecutive finals between 1956 and 1972, where the hockey team won 2 gold and 3 silver medals in quick succession.

Arshad Nadeem is the only Pakistani athlete to have won an individual Olympic gold medal and set an Olympic record.

== Timeline of participation ==
Olympic Year/s	Teams		
1900–1932	India		
1936	India		
1948–1968	India	Pakistan	
1972–1980	India	Pakistan	
1984–present	India	Pakistan	Bangladesh

== History ==
=== Before independence (pre–1947) ===
In the Olympic Games up until 1936, athletes from modern-day Pakistan participated as part of the team from British India. Several gold medalists for India in field hockey were born in what became Pakistan, including Muhammad Aslam (1932), Lal Shah Bokhari (1932), Sayed Jaffar (1932 and 1936), Ali Dara (1936) and Peter Paul Fernandes (1936). Bokhari was also selected as India's flagbearer in the 1932 opening ceremony. All of these men opted to play for Pakistan post independence in 1947. Others made the switch after the 1948 Olympics, such as Latif-ur Rehman and Akhtar Hussain.

=== Early years (1948 – 1952) ===
Pakistan first participated in the 1948 Summer Olympics and sent a contingent of 39 athletes that took part across seven different sports. The standout performers were the men's hockey team who topped their group by beating Belgium, Denmark, France and the Netherlands but lost their semi-final match to Great Britain 0–2. Pakistan then faced the Netherlands during the bronze medal match. Initially Pakistan drew with the Netherlands 1–1, but during the replay lost 1–4 and had to settle for a 4th placed finish.

During the 1952 Summer Olympics, there was much of the same result, with the hockey team reaching the semis where they lost to Netherlands 0–1 and then went on to lose the bronze medal match to Great Britain 1–2. Yet again finishing at the 4th place. Other highlights during the games included the Men's 4 x 100 metres relay team which also reached the semi-finals.

=== Men's Hockey Team's Golden Era (1956 – 1984) ===
==== Melbourne 1956: Hockey team wins Silver medal ====
Pakistan men's hockey team's 'Golden Era' began during 1956, when they cruised through to the finals by beating Great Britain 3–2 in the semi-final, to set up a clash with arch-rivals India. Pakistan lost the final to India 0–1, but in doing so, secured their first ever Olympic medal, a silver medal. Elsewhere Abdul Khaliq reached the semi-finals of both the Men's 100 metres and Men's 200 metres. As did Ghulam Raziq who reached the semi-final of the Men's 110 metres hurdles and Pakistan also reached the semi-finals of the Men's 4 x 100 metres relay.

==== Rome 1960: Hockey team wins Gold, Muhammad Bashir wins Bronze ====
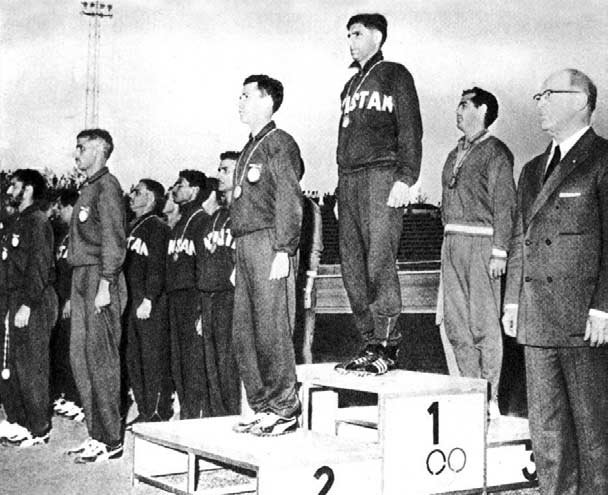
Medal ceremony for the gold medalist Pakistan hockey team at the 1960 Olympic games in Rome

During the 1960 Summer Olympics, the hockey team topped their group by comprehensively beating Australia 3–0, Poland 8–0 and Japan 10–0. They then beat Germany 2–1 in the quarter-finals and Spain 1–0 in the semi-final to set up another showdown with India. This time Pakistan came out as the successors and beat India 1–0 in the final to clinch their first ever Olympic gold medal and in the process halted India's run of 6 consecutive gold medals.

In the Men's freestyle welterweight wrestling, Muhammad Bashir made history by reaching the last round and finished 3rd out of 23 wrestlers, to win Pakistan its first ever individual medal and first ever non-hockey Olympic medal.

==== Tokyo 1964: Hockey team wins a Silver medal ====
At the 1964 Summer Olympics the hockey team continued their good form from the previous Olympics and marched into the semi-finals where they decisively beat Spain 3–0. However, the hockey team then came undone against India in the final and couldn't replicate the success of four years ago, so they had to settle for a silver medal after losing to India 0–1.

==== Mexico City 1968: Hockey team wins Gold yet again ====
During the 1968 Summer Olympics, Pakistan chose to reduce their contingent to only 20 players and focussed only on the sports of men's field hockey and men's wrestling, as those were the sports where Pakistan had previously achieved success. The Hockey team remained undefeated throughout the group stage to reach the semi-final where they beat Germany 1–0 after extra time, before beating Australia 2–1 in the final to win the gold medal for a second time.

==== Munich 1972: Hockey team settles for a Silver medal ====
At the 1972 Summer Olympics, Pakistan's hockey team played fairly well to reach the semis where they beat India 2–0 before facing West Germany in the finals. The final was marked with controversy with Pakistan being unhappy with the umpiring throughout the match. Pakistan protested against a goal being disallowed, along with a controversial decision to award West Germany a penalty corner through which they scored the only goal of the match and went on to win the gold medal. All eleven Pakistani players who played in the final were later suspended for disorderly and unsporting behaviour during the medal ceremony. The Pakistan Hockey Federation was suspended for 4 years, while the manager of the hockey team and the players involved in the incidents after the final were handed lifetime bans. The bans and suspensions were only revoked in 1974, when the then Prime Minister of Pakistan, Zulfikar Ali Bhutto, personally apologised for the incidents.

==== Montreal 1976: Hockey team has to settle for a Bronze medal, introduction of AstroTurfs ====
For the first time since 1952, Pakistan's hockey team failed to reach the Olympic final at the 1976 Summer Olympics. The team topped their group but lost to Australia 1–2 in the semi-final and only won the bronze medal after defeating the Netherlands 3–2 in the bronze medal match. This was also the first time that field hockey matches during the Olympics were played on AstroTurf surfaces.

==== Los Angeles 1984: Hockey team is back to winnings ways, wins a Gold medal ====
After boycotting the 1980 Summer Olympics held in Moscow as a protest against the Soviet invasion of Afghanistan, Pakistan returned to the 1984 Summer Olympics in Los Angeles and picked up from where they had left off. The hockey team ranked 2nd in their group behind Great Britain and made it to the semi-finals where they beat Australia 1–0, before beating West Germany 2–1, to clinch their 3rd Olympic title.

=== 3rd place finishes for Hussain Shah and Men's Hockey team (1988 – 1992) ===
==== Seoul 1988: Hussain Shah wins Bronze in Boxing ====
The hockey team had its worst performance yet at the 1988 Summer Olympics as they failed to qualify for the semi-finals and finished fifth after beating India 2–1. However, Hussain Shah saved the country from embarrassment.

Hussain Shah received a bye in the round of 64, before cruising through the rounds to reach the semi-final, guaranteeing himself a bronze medal. He lost the semi-final to Egerton Marcus, but ended up as joint 3rd place to win Pakistan its first ever individual medal in boxing and only the second ever individual medal after the bronze medal won by Muhammad Bashir in 1960.

==== Barcelona 1992: Hockey team wins Bronze medal ====
After the debacle in Seoul 1988, the hockey team went about business as usual and topped their group by remaining unbeaten in the 1992 Summer Olympics. They did lose the semi-final to Germany 1–2, but came from behind in the bronze medal match to beat the Netherlands 4–3 and won the bronze medal.

=== Decline (1996 – 2016) ===
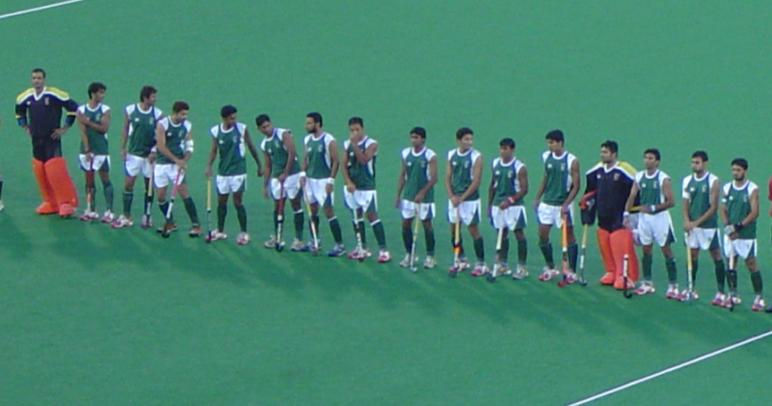
The national team at the 2008 Summer Olympics in Beijing.

The decline in Olympics for Pakistan coincides with the decline in the fortunes of their hockey team. The hockey team failed to win an Olympic medal during this time period. With the only highlight being when the hockey team reached the semi-finals during the 2000 Summer Olympics in Sydney, but lost to South Korea 0–1 and then lost the bronze medal match to Australia 3–6. It all culminated with 2016 being the worst ever games for Pakistan, as the hockey team failed to qualify, and none of Pakistan's athletes managed to make it out of their preliminary rounds. Shabana Akhtar became the first Pakistani woman to compete at the Olympics when she took part in the women's long jump at the 1996 Atlanta Olympics.

=== Pakistan’s Winter Olympic Games Firsts (2010 - Present day) ===
Despite being home to some of the world's highest mountains, Pakistan has little winter sports infrastructure, limited funding, and no sustained Olympic training pipeline. As a result, its Winter Olympians have largely qualified through the basic quota system, often training abroad or relying on personal sacrifice rather than state support. Ironically, all of Pakistan's alpine Olympians come from Gilgit-Baltistan, a snowbound region rich in terrain but long excluded from national sports investment. With no Olympic medals yet and so many structural challenges, Pakistan's Winter Olympics story remains less about podium finishes and more about persistence, visibility, and simply showing up on the world's biggest stage.

==== Muhammad Abbas: The Trailblazer (2010 Vancouver) ====
Pakistan’s Winter Olympics journey began in 2010 when alpine skier Muhammad Abbas became the country’s first-ever Winter Olympian at the Vancouver Games, marking Pakistan’s historic entry into winter competition. Abbas finished 79th, a remarkable achievement considering he grew up training with basic equipment and wooden skis made by his family.

==== Muhammad Karim: The Standard Bearer (2014 – 2026) ====
The momentum continued with Muhammad Karim, who became the second Pakistani Winter Olympian at the 2014 Sochi Games, later representing the country again in 2018, 2022, and 2026, and becoming Pakistan’s first Olympic slalom competitor. Growing up, Karim said "he started skiing at the age of 4 years on wooden skis made by my uncle," and recalled that early experience was all he had before official support arrived. At Sochi, he finished 71st in the giant slalom, Pakistan's best Winter Olympics result at the time. Karim went on to represent Pakistan again at the 2018 PyeongChang and 2022 Beijing Games. At the 2018 Olympics, he finished 72nd in giant slalom.

==== Syed Human: Expanding Horizons (2018 PyeongChang) ====
Pakistan’s winter presence further expanded at the 2018 PyeongChang Games, where Syed Human competed in cross-country skiing, delivering the nation’s first appearance in Olympic cross-country skiing. Competing in the men's 15 km freestyle, Human recorded 104th place overall.

=== Resurgence (2020 – Present day) ===
==== Tokyo 2020: Arshad Nadeem reaches Javelin throw Final ====
10 athletes represented Pakistan at the 2020 Summer Olympics. Resurgence from Pakistan began on the back of performances from Arshad Nadeem and Talha Talib. Arshad Nadeem made history by becoming the first Pakistani athlete to qualify for the Olympics directly and then qualifying for the final with a throw of 85.16m where he topped his group and was 3rd amongst the qualifiers. But he failed to replicate that performance in the final and mentioned the nerves of the occasion getting to him. He ended up on 5th place with a throw of 84.62m in the Final. Talha Talib during his Men's 67 kg weightlifting event, lifted 150 kg during the snatch round, which placed him in 2nd place. But lifted 170 kg during the clean and jerk round, which placed him 7th in the round, and 5th overall. He missed out on a bronze medal by just 2kgs.

==== Paris 2024: Arshad Nadeem wins Gold medal, creates Olympic record ====
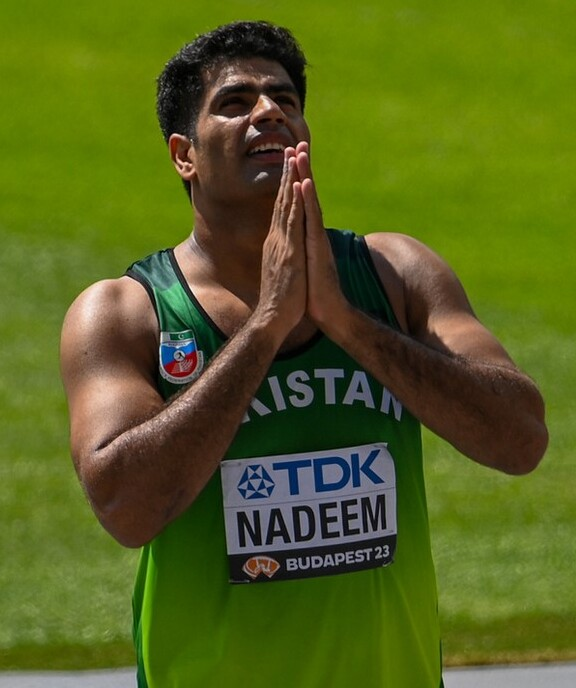
Arshad Nadeem, javelin thrower and Pakistan's first Olympic Gold medallist in athletics.

Pakistan sent a contingent of 7 athletes to participate at the 2024 Summer Olympics. Arshad Nadeem made history for Pakistan by becoming the first ever Pakistani to win an individual Olympic gold medal with an Olympic record throw of 92.97m. Arshad also threw another 90m+ throw, with his last throw being 91.79m, which was also longer than the Olympic record of 90.57m set in Beijing 2008. Arshad's gold medal was the first gold medal won by Pakistan since 1984, the first Olympic medal won since 1992, and his throw of 92.97m was also the 6th longest throw in history, when considering only the best throw from each athlete.

== Medal tables ==
Peach colour indicates best performance

=== Medals by Summer Games ===
Games	Athletes	Athletes by sport												Medals			Total	Rank	Ref.
Games	Athletes	Athletics	Badminton	Boxing	Cycling	Field Hockey	Judo	Sailing	Shooting	Swimming	Table tennis	Weightlifting	Wrestling	Gold medal	Silver medal	Bronze medal	Total	Rank	Ref.
1900–1936	as part of British India																		
1948 London	39	5	-	3	2	19	-	-	-	4	-	2	4	-	-	-	0	–	
1952 Helsinki	44	16	-	4	2	18	-	-	1	2	-	1	1	-	-	-	0	–	
1956 Melbourne	62	19	-	6	4	18	-	-	2	3	-	3	6	-	1	-	1	31	
1960 Rome	49	12	-	4	2	18	-	-	4	-	-	2	7	1	-	1	2	20	
1964 Tokyo	41	6	-	4	4	18	-	-	5	-	-	1	6	-	1	-	1	30	
1968 Mexico City	20	-	-	-	-	18	-	-	-	-	-	-	2	1	-	-	1	29	
1972 Munich	25	5	-	2	-	18	-	-	-	-	-	1	2	-	1	-	1	33	
1976 Montreal	24	2	-	2	-	16	-	-	-	-	-	2	2	-	-	1	1	37	
1980 Moscow	boycotted																		
1984 Los Angeles	29	3	-	4	-	16	-	6	-	-	-	-	2	1	-	-	1	25	
1988 Seoul	31	7	-	2	-	16	-	2	-	-	1	-	3	-	-	1	1	46	
1992 Barcelona	27	4	-	4	-	16	-	2	-	-	-	-	1	-	-	1	1	54	
1996 Atlanta	24	2	-	4	-	16	-	-	-	1	-	-	1	-	-	-	0	–	
2000 Sydney	27	2	-	4	-	16	-	3	1	1	-	-	-	-	-	-	0	–	
2004 Athens	26	2	-	5	-	16	-	-	1	2	-	-	-	-	-	-	0	–	
2008 Beijing	21	2	-	-	-	16	-	-	1	2	-	-	-	-	-	-	0	–	
2012 London	21	2	-	-	-	16	-	-	1	2	-	-	-	-	-	-	0	–	
2016 Rio de Janeiro	7	2	-	-	-	-	1	-	2	2	-	-	-	-	-	-	0	–	
2020 Tokyo	10	2	1	-	-	-	1	-	3	2	-	1	-	-	-	-	0	–	
2024 Paris	7	2	-	-	-	-	-	-	3	2	-	-	-	1	-	-	1	62	
2028 Los Angeles	future event																		
2032 Brisbane	future event																		
Total														4	3	4	11	78	

=== Medals by Winter Games ===
Games	Athletes	Athletes by sport		Medals			Total	Rank	Ref.
Games	Athletes	Alpine skiing	Cross country skiing	Gold medal	Silver medal	Bronze medal	Total	Rank	Ref.
2010 Vancouver	1	1	-	-	-	-	0	–	
2014 Sochi	1	1	-	-	-	-	0	–	
2018 Pyeongchang	2	1	1	-	-	-	0	–	
2022 Beijing	1	1	-	-	-	-	0	–	
2026 Milano Cortina	1	1	-	-	-	-	0	–	
2030 French Alps	future event								
2034 Utah	future event								
Total				0	0	0	0	–	

=== Medals by summer sport ===
Sport	(gold) Gold	(silver) Silver	(bronze) Bronze	Total	Rank
Field hockey	3	3	2	8	6
Athletics	1	0	0	1	74
Boxing	0	0	1	1	74
Wrestling	0	0	1	1	65
Totals (4 entries)	4	3	4	11	78

== List of medalists ==
Here is the complete list of Pakistani medalists at the Olympics over the years.

Medal	Medalist	Games	Sport	Event	Date
(silver) Silver	Men's Field Hockey Team: Abdul Rashid Akhtar Hussain Munir Dar Ghulam Rasul Anwar Khan Habib Ali Kiddie Latif-ur-Rehman Manzoor Hussain Atif Motiullah Naseer Bunda Noor Alam Khursheed Aslam Abdul Waheed Mushtaq Ahmad Zakir Hussain	(Australia) 1956 Melbourne	Field hockey	Men's tournament	6 December 1956
(gold) Gold	Men's Field Hockey Team: Abdul Hamid Rashid Abdul Abdul Waheed Bashir Ahmad Ghulam Rasul Anwar Khan Khursheed Aslam Habib Ali Kiddie Manzoor Hussain Atif Mushtaq Ahmad Motiullah Naseer Bunda Noor Alam Munir Dar	(Italy) 1960 Rome	Field hockey	Men's tournament	9 September 1960
(bronze) Bronze	Muhammad Bashir	(Italy) 1960 Rome	Wrestling	Men's freestyle welterweight	6 September 1960
(silver) Silver	Men's Field Hockey Team: Abdul Rashid Akhtar Hussain Munir Dar Ghulam Rasul Anwar Khan Habib Ali Kiddie Latif-ur-Rehman Manzoor Hussain Atif Motiullah Naseer Bunda Noor Alam Anwar Khan Nawaz Khizar Khurshid Azam Muhammad Manna Manzoor Hussain Atif Mohammed Rashid Motiullah Tariq Niazi Saeed Anwar Aziz Tariq Hayat Zafar Uddin Zaka	(Japan) 1964 Tokyo	Field hockey	Men's tournament	23 October 1964
(gold) Gold	Men's Field Hockey Team: Abdul Rasheed Jahangir Butt Tanvir Dar Gulraiz Akhtar Khalid Mahmood Muhammad Asad Malik Ashfaq Ahmed Tariq Niazi Riaz Ahmed Riazuddin Saeed Anwar Tariq Aziz Zakir Hussain	1968 Mexico City	Field hockey	Men's tournament	26 October 1968
(silver) Silver	Men's Field Hockey Team: Rashid Abdul Akhtar Rasool Ul Akhtar Jahangir Butt Ur Fazal Islahuddin Siddique Muhammad Asad Malik Shahnaz Sheikh Munawwaruz Zaman Ahmad Riaz Saeed Anwar Saleem Sherwani Iftikar Syed Mudassar Syed Zahid Sheikh	(Germany) 1972 Munich	Field hockey	Men's tournament	10 September 1972
(bronze) Bronze	Men's Field Hockey Team: Rashid Abdul Akhtar Rasool Mahmood Arshad Arshad Chaudhry Khan Haneef Islahuddin Siddique Samiullah Khan Manzoor-ul Hassan Manzoor Hussain Munawwaruz Zaman Zia Qamar Nazim Salim Shahnaz Sheikh Saleem Sherwani Iftikar Syed Mudassar Syed	(Canada) 1976 Montreal	Field hockey	Men's tournament	30 July 1976
(gold) Gold	Men's Field Hockey Team: Syed Ghulam Moinuddin Qasim Zia Nasir Ali Abdul Rashid Al-Hasan Ayaz Mahmood Naeem Akhtar Kaleemullah Khan Manzoor Hussain Hassan Sardar Hanif Khan Khalid Hamid Shahid Ali Khan Tauqeer Dar Ishtiaq Ahmed Saleem Sherwani Mushtaq Ahmad	(United States) 1984 Los Angeles	Field hockey	Men's tournament	11 August 1984
(bronze) Bronze	Hussain Shah	(South Korea) 1988 Seoul	Boxing	Men's middleweight	27 September 1988
(bronze) Bronze	Men's Field Hockey Team: Saeed Anjum Farhat Hassan Khan Khalid Bashir Muhammad Khawaja Mansoor Ahmed Asif Bajwa Ikhlaq Muhammad Mohammad Khalid Sr Qamar Muhammad Hussain Musaddaq Rana Mujahid Shahbaz Ahmed Muhammad Shahbaz Shahid Ali Khan Tahir Zaman Wasim Feroz	(Spain) 1992 Barcelona	Field hockey	Men's tournament	8 August 1992
(gold) Gold	Arshad Nadeem	(France) 2024 Paris	Athletics	Men's javelin throw	8 August 2024

== Men's Field Hockey team at the Summer Olympics ==
Team	(United Kingdom) 1948	(Finland) 1952	(Australia) 1956	(Italy) 1960	(Japan) 1964	(Mexico) 1968	(West Germany) 1972	(Canada) 1976	(Soviet Union) 1980	(United States) 1984	(South Korea) 1988	(Spain) 1992	(United States) 1996	(Australia) 2000	(Greece) 2004	(China) 2008	(United Kingdom) 2012	(Brazil) 2016	(Japan) 2020	(France) 2024	(United States) 2028	(Australia) 2032	Total
Pakistan	4th	4th	2nd	1st	2nd	1st	2nd	3rd	DNP	1st	5th	3rd	6th	4th	5th	8th	7th	DNQ			TBD		16

TBD (to be determined), DNQ (did not qualify), DNP (did not participate)

== Milestones ==
=== Firsts ===
- First Medal: 1956 Melbourne, (silver) , National field hockey team
- First Gold Medal: 1960 Rome, (gold) , National field hockey team
- First Individual Medal: 1960 Rome, (bronze) , Muhammad Bashir, Wrestling
- First Individual Gold Medal: 2024 Paris, (gold) , Arshad Nadeem, Javelin throw

=== Multiple Medalists ===
Athlete	Sport	Games	Gold	Silver	Bronze	Total
Manzoor Hussain Atif	Field hockey	1952–64	1	2	0	3
Munir Dar	Field hockey	1956–64	1	2	0	3
Anwar Khan	Field hockey	1956–64	1	2	0	3
Motiullah Khan	Field hockey	1956–64	1	2	0	3
Saeed Anwar	Field hockey	1964–72	1	2	0	3
Muhammad Asad Malik	Field hockey	1964–72	1	2	0	3
Abdul Rashid	Field hockey	1968–76	1	1	1	3
Abdul Hamid	Field hockey	1948–60	1	1	0	2
Habib Ali Kiddie	Field hockey	1952–60	1	1	0	2
Chaudhry Ghulam Rasool	Field hockey	1956–60	1	1	0	2
Noor Alam	Field hockey	1956–60	1	1	0	2
Naseer Bunda	Field hockey	1956–60	1	1	0	2
Zakir Hussain	Field hockey	1956–68	1	1	0	2
Khwaja Zakauddin	Field hockey	1960–64	1	1	0	2
Khalid Mahmood	Field hockey	1964–68	1	1	0	2
Tariq Aziz	Field hockey	1964–68	1	1	0	2
Tariq Niazi	Field hockey	1964–68	1	1	0	2
Jahangir Butt	Field hockey	1968–72	1	1	0	2
Riaz Ahmed	Field hockey	1968–72	1	1	0	2
Manzoor Hussain	Field hockey	1976–84	1	0	1	2
Hanif Khan	Field hockey	1976–84	1	0	1	2
Shahid Ali Khan	Field hockey	1984–92	1	0	1	2
Saleem Sherwani	Field hockey	1972–76	0	1	1	2
Munawwar uz Zaman	Field hockey	1972–76	0	1	1	2
Akhtar Rasool	Field hockey	1972–76	0	1	1	2
Mudassar Asghar	Field hockey	1972–76	0	1	1	2
Islahuddin Siddique	Field hockey	1972–76	0	1	1	2
Shahnaz Sheikh	Field hockey	1972–76	0	1	1	2
Iftikhar Ahmed Syed	Field hockey	1972–76	0	1	1	2

=== Best Performances in Individual events ===
Athlete(s)	Event	Games	Result
Muhammad Iqbal	Men's hammer throw	1956 Melbourne	11th place in Final (56.97m)
Muhammad Nawaz	Men's javelin throw	1956 Melbourne	14th place in Final (62.55m)
Muhammad Iqbal	Men's hammer throw	1960 Rome	12th place in Final (61.79m)
Muhammad Bashir	Wrestling – Men's freestyle welterweight	1960 Rome	3rd place (bronze)
Hussain Shah	Boxing – Men's Middleweight	1988 Seoul	3rd place (bronze)
Talha Talib	Weightlifting – Men's 67 kg	2020 Tokyo	5th place (320 kg)
Arshad Nadeem	Men's javelin throw	2020 Tokyo	5th place in Final (84.62m)
Arshad Nadeem	Men's javelin throw	2024 Paris	1st place (gold) (92.97m) OR

=== Best Performances in Athletics - track events ===
Athlete(s)	Event	Games	Result
Muhammad Aslam, Abdul Aziz, Muhammad Shariff Butt, Muhammad Fazil	Men's 4 x 100 metres relay	1952 Helsinki	Semi-Final
Abdul Khaliq	Men's 100 metres	1956 Melbourne	4th in Semi-Final heat
Abdul Khaliq	Men's 200 metres	1956 Melbourne	4th in Semi-Final heat – Stands in top seven athletes
Ghulam Raziq	Men's 110 metres hurdles	1956 Melbourne	Semi-Final
Abdul Aziz, Muhammad Sharif Butt, Abdul Khaliq, Ghulam Raziq	Men's 4 x 100 metres relay	1956 Melbourne	Semi-Final
Ghulam Raziq	Men's 110 metres hurdles	1960 Rome	4th in Semi-Final heat
Abdul Malik, Muhammad Ramzan Ali, Ghulam Raziq, Abdul Khaliq	Men's 4 x 100 metres relay	1960 Rome	Semi-Final
Bashir Ahmed, Mohammad Sadaqat, Mohammad Afzal, Muhammad Fayyaz	Men's 4 × 400 metres relay	1988 Seoul	Semi-Final

== See also ==
- List of flag bearers for Pakistan at the Olympics
- Olympic competitors for Pakistan
- Pakistan at the Paralympics
- Pakistan at the World Athletics Championships
- Pakistan at the Commonwealth Games
- Pakistan at the Asian Games
- Pakistan at the World Games
