= List of flag bearers for Pakistan at the Olympics =

Pakistan at the Olympics
- IOC code: PAK
- NOC: Pakistan Olympic Association
- Website: nocpakistan.org
- Medals: Gold 4 Silver 3 Bronze 4 Total 11

Summer appearances
- 1948; 1952; 1956; 1960; 1964; 1968; 1972; 1976; 1980; 1984; 1988; 1992; 1996; 2000; 2004; 2008; 2012; 2016; 2020; 2024; 2028

Winter appearances
- 2010; 2014; 2018; 2022; 2026

Other related appearances
- India (1900–pres.); Bangladesh (1984–pres.)

This is a list of individuals who have been the flag bearers for Pakistan at the Olympic Games opening ceremony over the years. Ahmed Zahur Khan was the flag bearer for Pakistan at the opening ceremony of the nation's inaugural Olympics. Muhammad Karim has carried the Pakistani flag at four Olympic Games, the most by any Pakistani Olympian in both the Winter and Summer Olympics. He was the flag bearer for Pakistan in the opening and closing ceremonies of the 2014, 2018, 2022 and 2026 Winter Olympics. Mahoor Shahzad became the first woman to carry the flag of Pakistan at the opening ceremony of Olympics along with the sports shooter Muhammad Khalil Akhtar.

== List of flag bearers ==
#	Event year	Season	Flag bearer	Sport
1	1948	Summer	Ahmed Zahur Khan	Athletics
2	1952	Summer	Niaz Khan	Field hockey
3	1956	Summer	Abdul Hamid	Field hockey
4	1960	Summer	Muhammad Iqbal	Athletics
5	1964	Summer	Manzoor Hussain Atif	Field hockey
6	1968	Summer	Tariq Aziz	Field hockey
7	1972	Summer	Muhammad Arshad Malik	Weightlifting
8	1976	Summer	Abdul Rashid Jr	Field hockey
9	1984	Summer	Manzoor Hussain	Field hockey
10	1988	Summer	Nasir Ali	Field hockey
11	1992	Summer	Shahbaz Ahmed	Field hockey
12	1996	Summer	Mansoor Ahmed	Field hockey
13	2000	Summer	Ahmed Alam	Field hockey
14	2004	Summer	Muhammad Nadeem	Field hockey
15	2008	Summer	Zeeshan Ashraf	Field hockey
16	2010	Winter	Muhammad Abbas	Alpine skiing
17	2012	Summer	Sohail Abbas	Field hockey
18	2014	Winter	Muhammad Karim	Alpine skiing
19	2016	Summer	Ghulam Mustafa Bashir	Shooting
20	2018	Winter	Muhammad Karim	Alpine skiing
21	2020	Summer	Muhammad Khalil Akhtar	Shooting
21	2020	Summer	Mahoor Shahzad	Badminton
22	2022	Winter	Muhammad Karim	Alpine skiing
23	2024	Summer	Jehanara Nabi	Swimming
23	2024	Summer	Arshad Nadeem	Athletics
24	2026	Winter	Muhammad Karim	Alpine skiing

== See also ==
- Pakistan at the Olympics
