= Arshad Chaudhry =

Pakistani field hockey player

Personal information
- Born: April 10, 1950 Lyallpur now Faisalabad, Punjab, Pakistan
- Died: June 11, 2015 (aged 65) Lahore, Pakistan
Medal record
Men's field hockey
Representing Pakistan
Olympic Games
Bronze medal – third place	1976 Montreal	Team competition
Asian Games
Gold medal – first place	1974 Tehran	Team competition

Arshad Ali Chaudhry (April 10, 1950 – June 11, 2015) was an international field hockey player from Pakistan. He was the son of Chaudhry Saddique Salar, nephew of Chaudhry Ghulam Rasool, and cousin of Akhtar Rasool.

== Early life and education ==
Chaudhry was born in Lyallpur now Faisalabad, a district heaquarter in Punjab, Pakistan. He earned his B.A. from Government College, Lyallpur where he was also the captain of college hockey team. He got an M.A. in history from Punjab University, Lahore in 1973. In 1975 he was selected Assistant Manager in PIA.

== Career ==
Chaudhry was selected for the Punjab University Hockey team in 1971 for the Inter-Varsity Hockey Championship held at Karachi. The team won the Inter-Varsity Championship the following year. Chaudhry remained an active hockey international player in the Pakistani national team from 1971 through 1976 and played as right half-back.

He represented Pakistan in over 33 national and international matches. He represented Pakistani Men's hockey team which participated in the 1975 third World Cup Hockey, held at Kuala Lumpur and won the Silver Medal. In 1976 he participated in the 1976 Summer Olympics held at Montreal and won a bronze medal. He retired from active hockey after the Montreal Olympics in 1976 and died in June 2015 at the age of 65.
