= Muhammad Karim =

Muhammad Karim may refer to:

- Mohammed Karim (1896–1972), Egyptian film director, writer, and producer
- Muhammad Karim (skier) (born 1995), alpine skier from Pakistan
