= Sajjad Haider Gujjar =

Pakistani politician (born 1957)

Member of the Provincial Assembly of the Punjab
- In office 29 May 2013 – 31 May 2018

Personal details
- Born: 28 June 1957 (age 69) Sheikhupura
- Party: Pakistan Muslim League (N)

Chaudhry Sajjad Haider Gujjar is a Pakistani politician who was a Member of the Provincial Assembly of the Punjab, from 2002 to 2007 and again from May 2013 to May 2018.

== Early life and education ==
He was born on 28 June 1957 in Sheikhupura.

He has a degree of Bachelor of Science (Hons) which he obtained in 1984 from University of Agriculture Faisalabad.

== Political career ==
He was elected to the Provincial Assembly of the Punjab as a candidate of Pakistan Muslim League (N) (PML-N) from Constituency PP-169 (Sheikhupura-Cum-Nanakana Sahib-II) in the 2002 Pakistani general election. He received 26,770 votes and defeated a candidate of Pakistan Muslim League (Q).

He ran for the seat of the Provincial Assembly of the Punjab as a candidate of PML-N from Constituency PP-169 (Sheikhupura-Cum-Nanakana Sahib-II) in the 2008 Pakistani general election, but was unsuccessful. He received 20,789 votes and lost the seat to a candidate of Pakistan Peoples Party.

He was re-elected to the Provincial Assembly of the Punjab as a candidate of PML-N from Constituency PP-169 (Sheikhupura-Cum-Nanakana Sahib-II) in the 2013 Pakistani general election.

In December 2013, he was appointed as Parliamentary Secretary for Housing Urban Development & Public Health Engineering.
