= Pakistan at the 2014 Winter Olympics =

- IOC code: PAK
- NOC: National Olympic Committee of Pakistan
- Website: www.nocpakistan.org

in Sochi
- Competitors: 1 in 1 sport
- Flag bearer (opening): Muhammad Karim
- Flag bearer (closing): Muhammad Karim
- Medals: Gold 0 Silver 0 Bronze 0 Total 0

Winter Olympics appearances (overview)
- 2010; 2014; 2018; 2022; 2026

Pakistan competed at the 2014 Winter Olympics in Sochi, Russia from 7 to 23 February 2014. Pakistan's team consisted of one athlete in alpine skiing. The country competed for the second consecutive Winter Games, after making its debut four years earlier in Vancouver. The flag bearer for the opening and closing ceremonies was Pakistan's sole athlete Muhammad Karim.

The 2014 Winter Olympics marked the first time that Pakistani athlete competed in Russia as Pakistan and 63 other western nations participated at the American-led boycott of the 1980 Summer Olympics in Moscow because of the Soviet-Afghan war.

== Background ==
The first ski resort in Pakistan was opened in 1958, in the Naltar Valley. It was originally for air force pilots to train, but later opened up to civilians. The Ski Federation of Pakistan was founded in 1990. The 2010 Olympic Games was Pakistan's debut at the Winter Olympics. sending one athlete to compete in the giant slalom. They first participated at the Summer Olympics in the 1948 Games, and won their first Summer Olympics medal in 1956.

The Pakistan Ski Federation feared their qualified athlete might not be able to compete at the Games, due to the continuing conflict between the Pakistan Olympic Association and the Pakistani Government. The International Olympic Committee had given a deadline of January 2014 for both sides to solve their dispute. The issues were solved and the country did compete as scheduled.

The flag bearer for the opening and closing ceremonies was Pakistan's sole athlete Muhammad Karim.

== Alpine skiing ==
Pakistan qualified one athlete for alpine skiing, Muhammad Karim. Pakistan's first winter Olympian Muhammad Abbas also traveled to the Games as a backup. Karim had less than the maximum 140 points needed to qualify for the B qualification standard, a requirement set by the Federation Internationale de Ski (FIS). Abbas and skier Mir Nawaz also qualified for the Olympics, but the Ski Federation of Pakistan elected to send the best of the three to compete, since they could only send one male athlete that qualified with the B qualification standard. Muhammad Karim became the second ever athlete to represent the country at the Winter Olympics. Karim managed to improve the country's placement in the giant slalom from four years prior by finishing in 71st place (among 72 athletes that finished the race).

Athlete	Event	Run 1		Run 2		Total	
Athlete	Event	Time	Rank	Time	Rank	Time	Rank
Muhammad Karim	Men's giant slalom	1:43.44	77	1:43.97	71	3:27.41	71

== See also ==
- Pakistan at the 2014 Summer Youth Olympics
