= Mian Nadeem Riaz =

Pakistani–American food scientist, academic, and author

- Born: Pakistan
- Occupations: Food scientist, academic and author

Academic background
- Education: BS Honors., Food Technology and Agriculture; MS Honors., Food Technology; PhD., Food Science
- Alma mater: University of Agriculture, Faisalabad; University of Maine

Academic work
- Institutions: Texas A&M University
- Website: miannadeemriaz.com

Mian Nadeem Riaz is a Pakistani–American food scientist, academic and author. He is a professor in food diversity, director of the Extrusion Technology Program and the Associate Department head of the Food Science and Technology Department at Texas A&M University.

Riaz's research is focused on halal food production and food processing using innovative technologies. He has authored and co-authored research articles and seven books including Halal Food Production, Halal Industrial Production Standards, Handbook of Halal Production, Extruders in Food Applications, Extruders and Expanders in Pet Food, Aquatic, and Livestock Feed, Soy Application in Foods, and Extrusion Problems Solved. He is the recipient of the 2016 University of Maine Bernard Lown Alumni Humanitarian Award, the 2023 International Food Security Award from the Institute of Food Technologists, and the 2023 Texas A&M University Dean's Outstanding Achievement Award for International Impact. He is also a frequent speaker at conferences.

== Education and early career ==
Riaz obtained a bachelor's degree in Food Technology and Agriculture in 1985 and a master's degree in Food Technology in 1987, both from the University of Agriculture, Faisalabad, where he also worked as a Research Assistant before moving to Maine, US. He became a Food Science Consultant in 1990 and was the first PhD graduate of the University of Maine Food and Nutrition Sciences Department in 1992.

== Career ==
Riaz ran the extrusion program at Texas A&M University in 1992. He later joined the Faculty of the Institute of Food Science and Engineering at Texas A&M University in 1995 and became a Graduate Faculty in 1998. He has been the Holder of the Professorship in Food Diversity in the Food Science and Technology Department since 2017.

Riaz been the Head of the Extrusion Technology Program and the Research Scientist of the Texas A&M Engineering Experiment Station since 1997 and the Associate Department Head since 2022. He served on various committees while at Texas A&M, serving on the Department Head Search Committee, and the New Faculty Search Committee. He established Food Extrusion Center at the University of Agriculture, Faisalabad and Fruit and Vegetable Processing Center at University of Sargodha, both with USAID funding.

== Research ==
Riaz has contributed to the field of food science by studying halal food, extrusion processing of food and feed, oilseed processing, snack food, pet food, vegetable protein processing, and religious and ethnic foods.

== Works ==
Riaz's works largely focus on halal food, extrusion, and food processing. He co-edited the Handbook of Halal Food Production with Muhammad M. Chaudhry, which covered the aspects of halal food production, guidelines, market dynamics, and certification requirements, addressing the growing global demand for Halal food. They also co-authored Halal Food Production providing information on food laws, regulations, production guidelines, and trade requirements for halal food. In a review for the Journal of Aquatic Food Product Technology, Keith W. Gates commented "The authors present the first comprehensive reference detailing Halal food production and certification requirements... a rare mix in one volume, practicality down to the expert's minutia combined with a fascinating and enlightening explanation of the spiritual basis for Halal, the Arabic word for 'permitted' or 'lawful.'"

Riaz published Soy Application in Foods in 2006, exploring the diverse uses of soy ingredients in the food industry, looking into processing conditions and applications. Later, in Extruders in Food Applications and Extruders and Expanders in Pet Food, Aquatic and Livestock Feeds, he offered practical insights on the application of extrusion technology in the food industry, covering various extruder types and applications for pet food and feed. He also co-authored Extrusion Problems Solved: Food, Pet Food and Feed with Galen J. Rocky which was called "an extremely informative book" by Donald G. Mercer.

=== Halal food production ===
Riaz has researched halal food production throughout his career. In a collaborative research paper, he highlighted the lack of transparency in disclosing the sources and processing of food ingredients, urging consumers to advocate for clearer labeling in halal and kosher food production. He outlined halal food laws for Muslims, emphasizing religious significance and offering guidance to the food industry, including dietary prohibitions, slaughter methods, the global halal market, and certification.

In 2021, Riaz and colleagues examined the acceptability of stunning methods in Halal meat production, weighing their pros and cons for economic and ethical considerations among Muslims.

=== Extrusion processing ===
Riaz studied extrusion processing by analyzing its effects and usage. He explored the various definitions of extrusion, emphasizing its role as a continuous cooking process with expanding applications in food, feed, and oilseed industries. In a joint research, he looked into the impact of extrusion, particularly on fat and water-soluble vitamins, revealing factors affecting their retention and sensitivity during the process.

Riaz investigated the surge in North America's plant-based meat alternatives, driven by dietary shifts, environmental concerns, and the nutritional value of pulse crops and proteins.

=== Food processing ===
Riaz's work on food processing focused on food proteins and fat and oil extraction from animals and vegetables. He assessed the importance of fats and oils as a primary energy source, emphasizing advancements in extraction technologies for high-quality fats from various sources, both animal and plant-based.

In a collaborative study, Riaz evaluated the flavor and lipid profiles of textured peanut (TP), a potential meat substitute, noting low volatile flavor compounds and stable lipid oxidation products during one year of storage. Furthermore, he produced extruded cereal flakes by substituting corn cones with different levels of nonroasted and roasted partially defatted peanut flour.

== Awards and honors ==
- 2016 – Bernard Lown Alumni Humanitarian Award, University of Maine
- 2023 – International Food Security Award, Institute of Food Technologists
- 2023 – Dean's Outstanding Achievement Award for International Impact, Texas A&M University

== Bibliography ==
=== Selected books ===
- Extruders in food applications (2000) ISBN 978-1566767798
- Halal Food Production (2004) ISBN 978-1587160295
- Soy Application in Foods (2006) ISBN 978-0849329814
- Extruders and Expanders in Pet Food, Aquatic and Livestock Feeds (2007) ISBN 978-3860373019
- Handbook of Halal Food Production (2018) ISBN 978-1498709712
- Extrusion Problem Solved (2024) ISBN 978-1845696641

=== Selected articles ===
- Lusas, E. W., & Riaz, M. N. (1995). Soy protein products: processing and use. The Journal of nutrition, 125(suppl_3), 573S-580S.
- Riaz, M. N. (1999). Soybeans as functional foods. Cereal foods world, 44(2), 88–92.
- Riaz, M. N. (2000). Introduction to extruders and their principles. In Extruders in food applications (pp. 1–23). CRC Press.
- Riaz, M. N., Asif, M., & Ali, R. (2009). Stability of vitamins during extrusion. Critical reviews in food science and nutrition, 49(4), 361–368.
- Asif, M., Rooney, L. W., Ali, R., & Riaz, M. N. (2013). Application and opportunities of pulses in food system: a review. Critical reviews in food science and nutrition, 53(11), 1168–1179.
- Khalil, M., Hayat, M. F., Batool, M., Ahmed, M., & Riaz, M. N. (2024). Pinostrobin attenuated cadmium instigated cardiotoxicity in albino rats: A biochemical, inflammatory, apoptotic and histopathological examination. Journal of King Saud University-Science, 36(2), 103074.
