= Niaz Khan (field hockey) =

Pakistani hockey player

Personal information
- Full name: Muhammad Niaz Khan
- Nationality: Pakistani
- Born: 21 August 1917 Jalandhar, British India
- Died: 19 October 2001 (aged 84)

Sport
- Sport: Field hockey

Muhammad Niaz Khan (21 August 1917 – 19 October 2001) was a Pakistani field hockey player. He competed at the 1948 Summer Olympics and the 1952 Summer Olympics, with Pakistan placing fourth in the field hockey tournaments on both occasions. He captained the hockey team during the 1952 Olympics. Khan was also the flag bearer for Pakistan at the opening ceremony of the 1952 Olympics, held in Helsinki.
