= University of Agriculture, Faisalabad =

Public university in Faisalabad, Pakistan

Coordinates: 31°26′2.18″N 73°3′53.6″E

University of Agriculture, Faisalabad (UAF)
- جامعہ زرعیہ فيصل آباد
- Latin: studio rusticarum Faisalabad
- Former names: Punjab Agricultural College and Research Institute (1906); West Pakistan Agricultural University (1961)
- Motto: Et ex omnibus virtutibus universitatis inter capability (Latin)
- Motto in English: The University brings out all abilities, including capability
- Type: Public research university, land-grant
- Established: 1906 (as an institute); 1961 (as a university)
- Affiliations: Higher Education Commission (Pakistan); Pakistan Engineering Council; Pakistan Veterinary Medical Council; Pharmacy Council of Pakistan; Association of Commonwealth Universities
- Budget: PKR 10 billion (2020-21)
- Chancellor: Governor of Punjab
- Vice-Chancellor: Zulfiqar Ali
- Students: 35,000 (September 2021)
- Location: Faisalabad-38000, Punjab, Pakistan
- Campus: 2,550 acres (10.3 km^{2}), Urban and Suburban
- Colors: Dark blue, Baby blue & Golden yellow
- Website: uaf.edu.pk

The University of Agriculture (UAF) is a public research university in Faisalabad, Pakistan. It is the largest university of Pakistan by area, with a covered area of 2,550 acres. It is ranked as a top university of Pakistan for Agriculture/Veterinary and is ranked among top ten Pakistani universities in general category.

== History ==
=== Origins ===
The University of Agriculture, Faisalabad (Urdu: جامعہ زرعیہ فيصل آباد), (formerly: Punjab Agricultural College and Research Institute), is a university in the city of Faisalabad, Punjab, Pakistan. It was established in 1906 as the first major institution of higher agricultural education in the British Punjab.

In 2009, the Vice Chancellor of the university said:

"Ours is the first agriculture university of the subcontinent so we are the trendsetters in this regard and have a specialised mandate. Faisalabad was chosen by our colonial rulers to set up an agriculture university as it was sandwiched between two canals."

At independence in 1947, Pakistan was a predominantly agricultural country. Despite subsequent industrialisation and development, agriculture remains central to its economy. After independence, the Government of Pakistan appointed the National Commissions on Food and Education to reform the existing agrarian system and to formulate measures for developing better agricultural potential. The commissions advocated for the establishment of an agricultural university for research and education. This resulted in the upgrade of the former Punjab Agricultural College and Research Institute in 1961. This had been the first university established by the British Empire. Plans were approved in 1906, and the foundation stone laying ceremony was carried out by Sir Louis Dane, the then lieutenant and governor of the Punjab. The college opened in 1909. The principal between 1923 and 1931 was Thomas Brownlie. By 1989, the university was reported to have 345 academic staff, 3,400 undergraduates and 600 postgraduates, and to be the country's "largest academic institution in agriculture".

The new campus is green with a conglomeration of monolithic blocks built in a modern style, and the old campus is reminiscent of traditional Muslim architecture. The main campus is situated in the centre of the city (12 km northeast of the Faisalabad International Airport), about 2 km away from the city centre and clock tower.

The university has a Zoology Museum, Art Gallery and University Library.

The university has hostels for men and women, including Jinnah Hostel (named after the founder of Pakistan Muhammad Ali Jinnah), Iqbal Hall, Fatima Jinnah Hostel and Hailey Hall. It accommodates over 15,000 students and approximately 12,000 day scholars.

== Organisation and administration ==
=== Faculties and departments ===
UAF is organised into faculties of Agriculture, Agricultural Engineering and Technology, Food Nutrition and Home Economics, Social sciences, Animal Husbandry, Food Sciences, Biotechnology, Biochemistry, Plant and Animal Breeding, Veterinary Science, Doctor of Pharmacy, Mathematics, Statistics and Sciences. A community college is on the main campus in Faisalabad. The College of Veterinary Sciences at Lahore was affiliated and is now a separate entity known as the University of Veterinary and Animal Sciences, Lahore (UVAS).

These units offer programmes leading to undergraduate and graduate degrees in agriculture and allied fields. HEC ranks the University of Agriculture, Faisalabad as the best in the agriculture/veterinary field in Pakistan. The University of Agriculture Faisalabad ranked number four among the top ten universities in Pakistan.

==== Faculty of Agriculture ====
- Six departments – Agronomy, Plant Breeding and Genetics, Agricultural Entomology, Plant Pathology, Crop Physiology and Forestry, Wildlife & Range Management.
- Three institutes – Institute of Soil & Environmental Sciences, and Institute of Horticultural Sciences and National Institute of Food Science and Technology.
- Seven allied disciplines – Agricultural Economics, Marketing & Agribusiness, Agricultural Extension, Animal Sciences, Computer Science, Mathematics and Statistics.
- The Centre of Agricultural Biochemistry and Biotechnology (CABB).
- The U.S. Pakistan Center for Advanced Studies in Agriculture and Food Security (USPCAS).

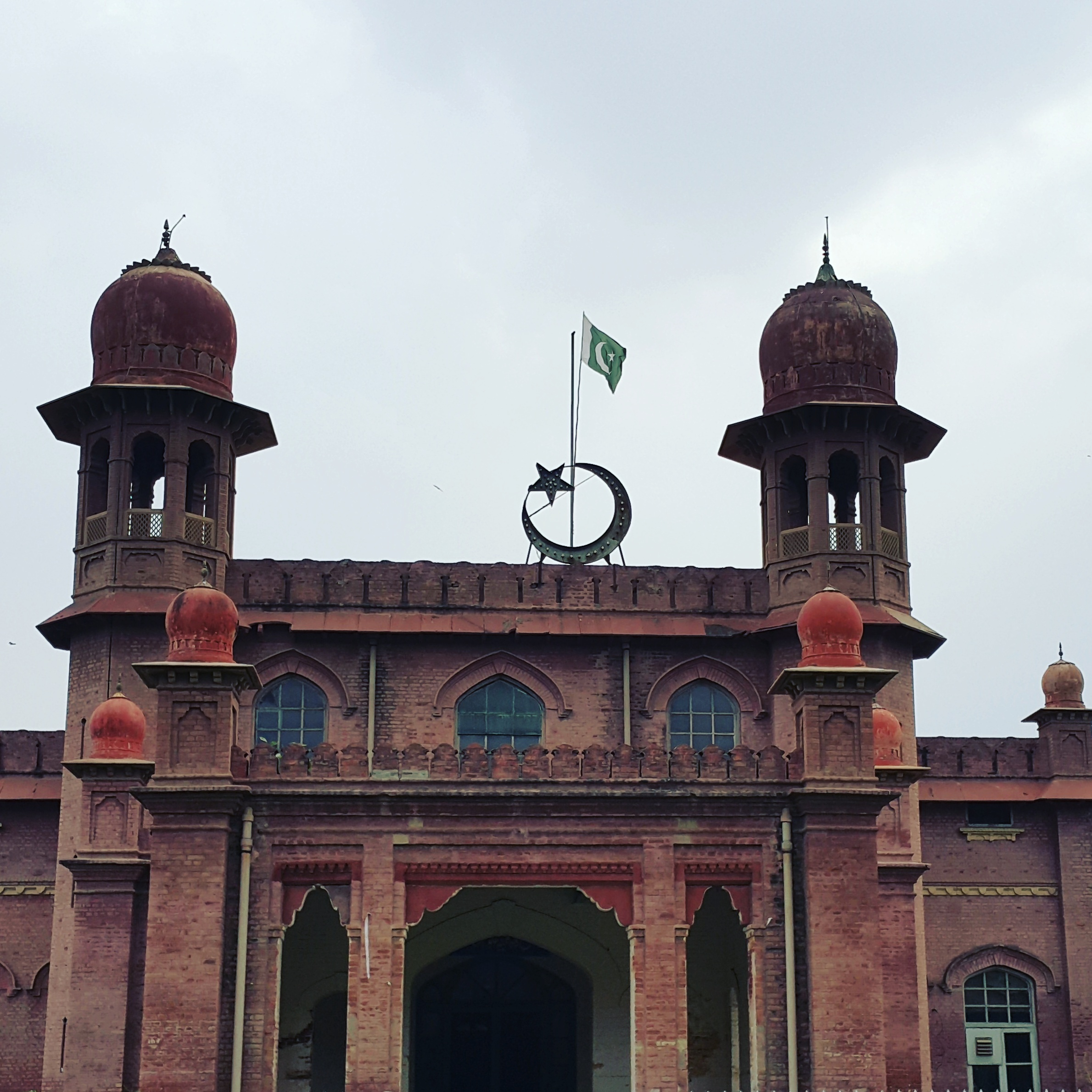

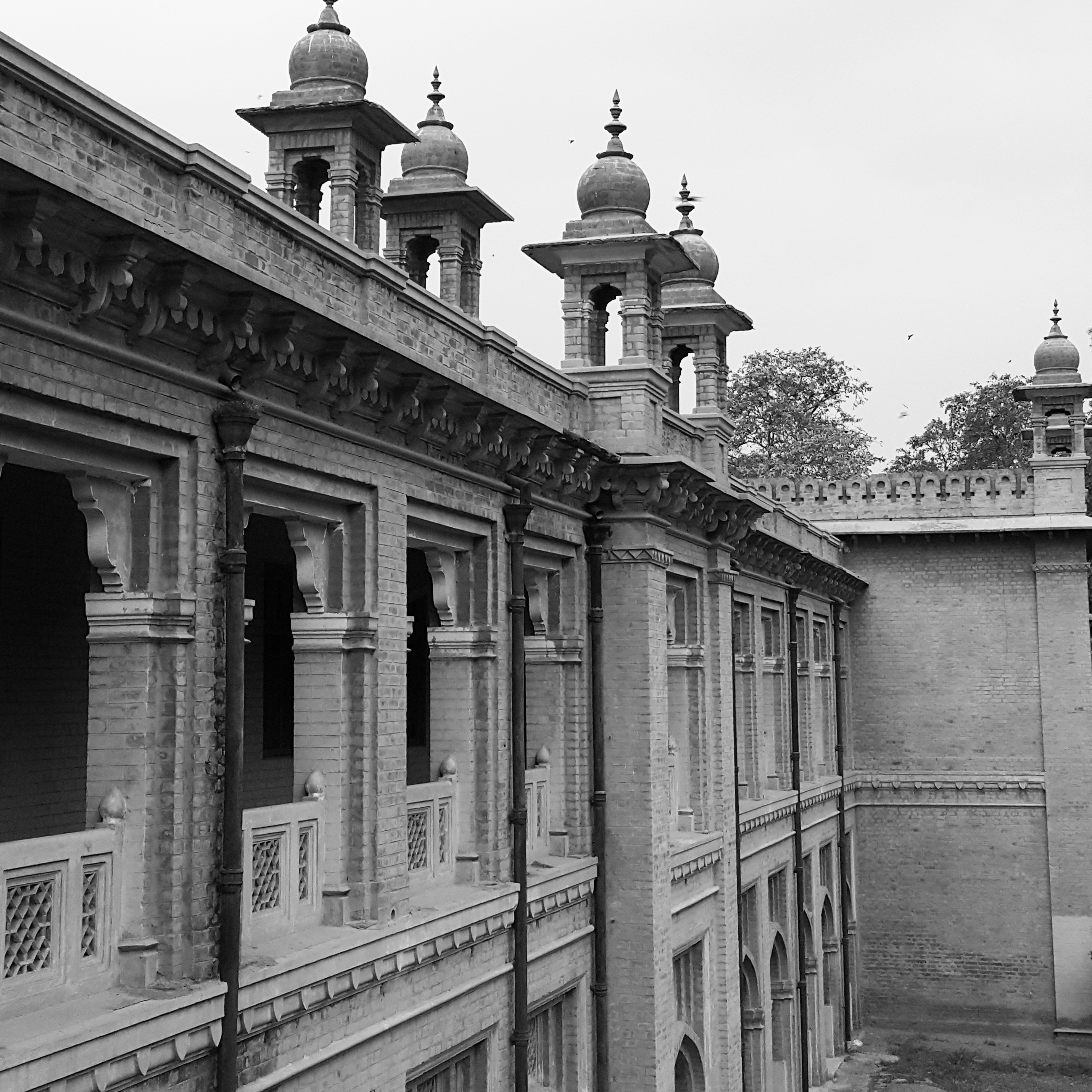
Old Building (since 1906) before independence

==== Faculty of Agricultural Engineering and Technology ====
The faculty includes the departments of Structural and Environmental Engineering, Energy Systems Engineering, Irrigation and Drainage, Food Engineering, Farm Machinery, and Power and Fibre Technology. Courses of study lead to the degrees of Bachelor of Science in Agricultural Engineering, Food Engineering, Textile Technology; M.Sc. in Food Technology, Fibre Technology, Agricultural Engineering; and Doctor of Philosophy in Food Technology and Agricultural Engineering.

The Department of Agricultural Engineering & Technology was established in 1961. The main objective of the faculty was to train people to cater to the growing needs of mechanised farming in the Punjab.

==== Department of Food Engineering ====
The Department of Food Engineering started in 2012. The department aims to educate students to design and produce safe, high-quality, and economical food products and processes, and to conduct research and development on the food industry.

==== Department of Farm Machinery and Power ====
This department, in collaboration with other departments, offers a baccalaureate program in Agricultural Engineering.

==== Department of Fibre and Textile Technology ====
The Department of Fibre and Textile Technology was established in the Faculty of Agriculture Engineering & Technology in 1964. It is the only department in the country that offers a master's degree programme in Fibre Technology. The main objective of this department is to impart scientific knowledge and technological training to the students in the field of Fibre science, Textile Technology (spinning, knitting, dyeing, finishing, testing & quality control), pulp, paper and cardboard technology to meet the demands of the industry.

==== Faculty of Veterinary Science ====
The faculty includes the department of Anatomy, Institute of Pharmacy Physiology and Pharmacology, Pathology, Parasitology, Microbiology, Clinical Medicine and Surgery, and Theriogenology. Candidates who hold degrees in biological sciences are considered for graduate admission in non-clinical subjects. The students are enrolled after an entry test held by the university for the degree of Doctor of Veterinary Medicine (D.V.M.), Pharm.D, M.Phil. and Ph.D. degrees. Professor Dr. Shahid Mehmood Kaushal is the Dean.

==== Faculty of Social Sciences ====
The Faculty of Agricultural Economics and Rural Sociology, with its constituent departments of Agricultural Economics, Farm Management, Agricultural Marketing, Cooperation and Credit and Rural Sociology, was established in 1963. The Faculty was restructured in 2012, and the name changed to Faculty of Social Sciences. The departments of Agricultural Economics, Development Economics, and Environmental & Resource Economics were merged into a new institute, Institute of Agricultural & Resource Economics (IARE). Professor Dr. Muhammad Ashfaq is the first director of IARE, having been in post since June 2012.

The Faculty of Social Sciences is divided into the following institutes:

- Institute of Agricultural and Resource Economics.
- Institute of Business Management Sciences (offers courses at undergraduate and postgraduate level).
- Institute of Agricultural Extension and Rural Development (offers courses at the undergraduate, postgraduate, and doctoral levels).
- Department of Rural Sociology (offers courses at the postgraduate level and a PhD programme).

The Institute of Agricultural and Resource Economics offers the following degrees:

- BSc (Hons) Agricultural & Resource Economics (four years)
- MSc (Hons) Agricultural Economics (two years)
- MSc (Hons) Development Economics (two years)
- MSc (Hons) Environmental & Resource Economics (two years)
- MSc Economics (Distance Learning) (two years)
- M.Phil. Economics (two years)
- PhD Agricultural Economics
- PhD Environmental & Resource Economics
- PhD Economics

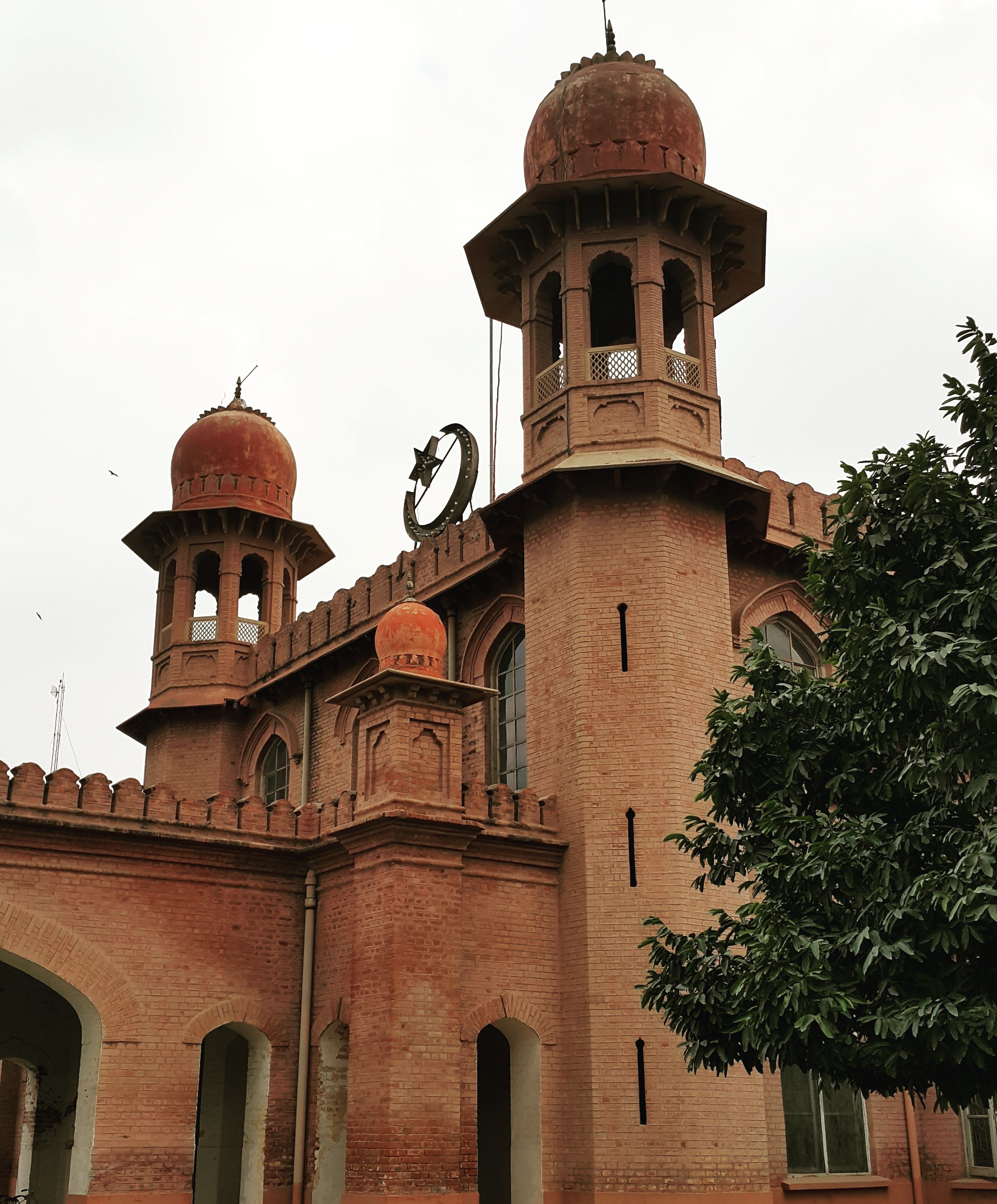
Old Science building

==== Faculty of Humanities ====
This includes the Department of Arts, Languages and Cultures, Art History, Classics and Ancient History, Linguistics, Religions and Theology and the University Language Centre.

==== Faculty of Animal Husbandry ====
The faculty includes the Department of Animal Breeding and Genetics, the Department of Livestock Management, the Department of Animal Nutrition and the Department of Poultry Science. It offers B.Sc. (Hons.) Animal Sciences and B.Sc. (Hons) Dairy Science at the main campus and B.Sc.(Hons) Poultry Science at one of the subcampuses, Toba Tek Singh. It also offers supporting courses for students of D.V.M., B.Sc. (Hons.) Agriculture and Food Sciences. It provides research facilities concerning livestock, poultry and their products to departments in the university and it provides advisory services to livestock and poultry farmers. Postgraduate courses leading to M.Sc. and Ph.D. degrees are offered by all four departments in the faculty. Prof. Dr. M. Sajjad Khan is the Dean.

==== Faculty of Sciences ====
The faculty includes the departments of Botany, Zoology and Fisheries, Chemistry and Biochemistry, Physics, Mathematics and Statistics, Business Management Sciences, Computer Science, Social Sciences and Humanities, and Islamic Studies. It offers undergraduate courses in physical, biological and social sciences and postgraduate degree programmes in Botany, Zoology and Fisheries, Chemistry, Bio-Chemistry, Physics, Statistics, Computer Science, Business Management and Commerce. Graduates of pure sciences from other institutions are eligible for admission to courses leading to M.Sc., M.Phil. and Ph.D. degrees. Graduates having a relevant bachelor's degree may also seek admission to MBA and M.Com. degree programmes. Munir Ahmad Sheikh is the Dean of the faculty.

=== Institute of Agricultural Extension and Rural Development ===
Most of the Division of Education & Extension is now part of the Faculty of Social Sciences. Tanvir Ali (ex-director, Graduate Studies, and ex-director, Division of Education and Extension) is now the director of the Institute of Agricultural Extension and Rural Development, Faculty of Social Sciences. The institute covers disciplines including Agricultural Extension, Agricultural Education, Agricultural Information (Mass Communication), Rural Sociology, Population Science, Gender Studies, and Rural Development. Courses are at undergraduate and graduate levels and include B.Sc. (Hons) Agriculture (Agri. Extension Major); M.Sc., M.Sc.(Hons), and PhD. A quarterly agricultural journal is published for farmers. On 14 August 2012, the institute started broadcasting on FM Radio 100.4 to disseminate agricultural innovations among farm communities and provide information, education, and entertainment to the public.

=== Research ===
The University of Agriculture Faisalabad is a major centre for research; as of 2017 it was the largest of the agricultural research universities in Pakistan. It receives billions for research and development. It has introduced modern techniques in agriculture. The university has two advanced scientific labs for research purposes. It partners with the University of California, Davis in research and exchange programmes. Research has been carried out since at least 1925, when research into cotton plants was being carried out. In 1947, the college was the only organisation of any kind in Pakistan carrying out agricultural research.

=== University of Agriculture Press ===
This is the university's academic publishing house. It publishes academic monographs, textbooks and journals, most of which are by university students and staff.

== Sub-campuses ==
=== Sub-campus Burewala Vehari ===
A sub-campus of University of Agriculture Faisalabad was established in Burewala in the district of Vehari to spread agriculture research across the country, especially in the south of Punjab.Near to Chichawatni

=== Sub-campus Toba Tek Singh ===
A sub-campus of the University of Agriculture, Faisalabad was established in Toba Tek Singh on 5 June 2005 to study the poultry industry. A four-year B.Sc. Poultry Science is offered at this campus. The principal of the institute is Prof. Dr. Zia ur Rehman.

=== Sub-campus Depalpur Okara ===
A sub campus was established at Depalpur in 2007 and was then transferred to Okara to spread agriculture research across the country, especially in the Central Punjab.

== Academic programmes ==
The following degree courses are offered:

=== Intermediate (pre-Agriculture) ===
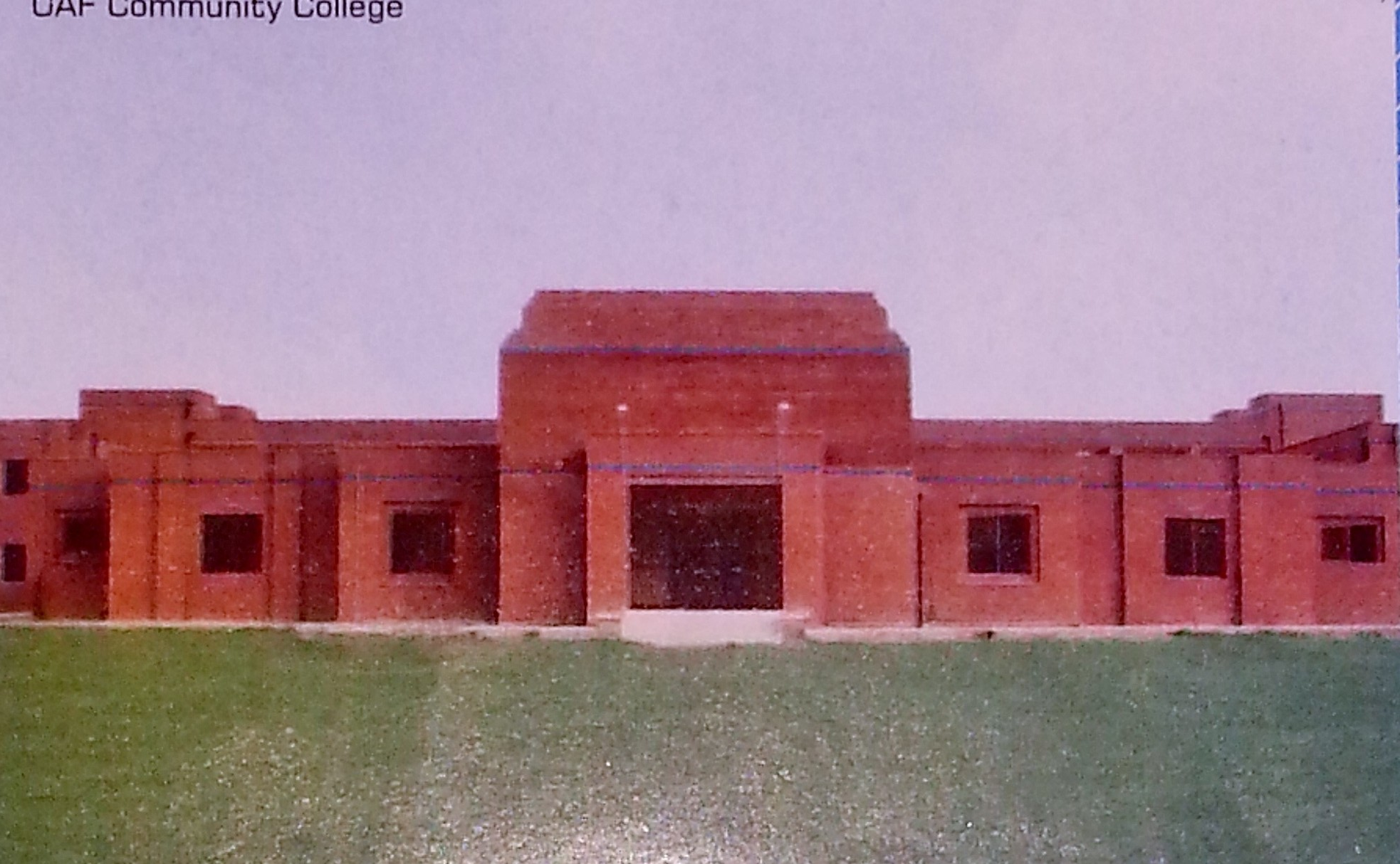
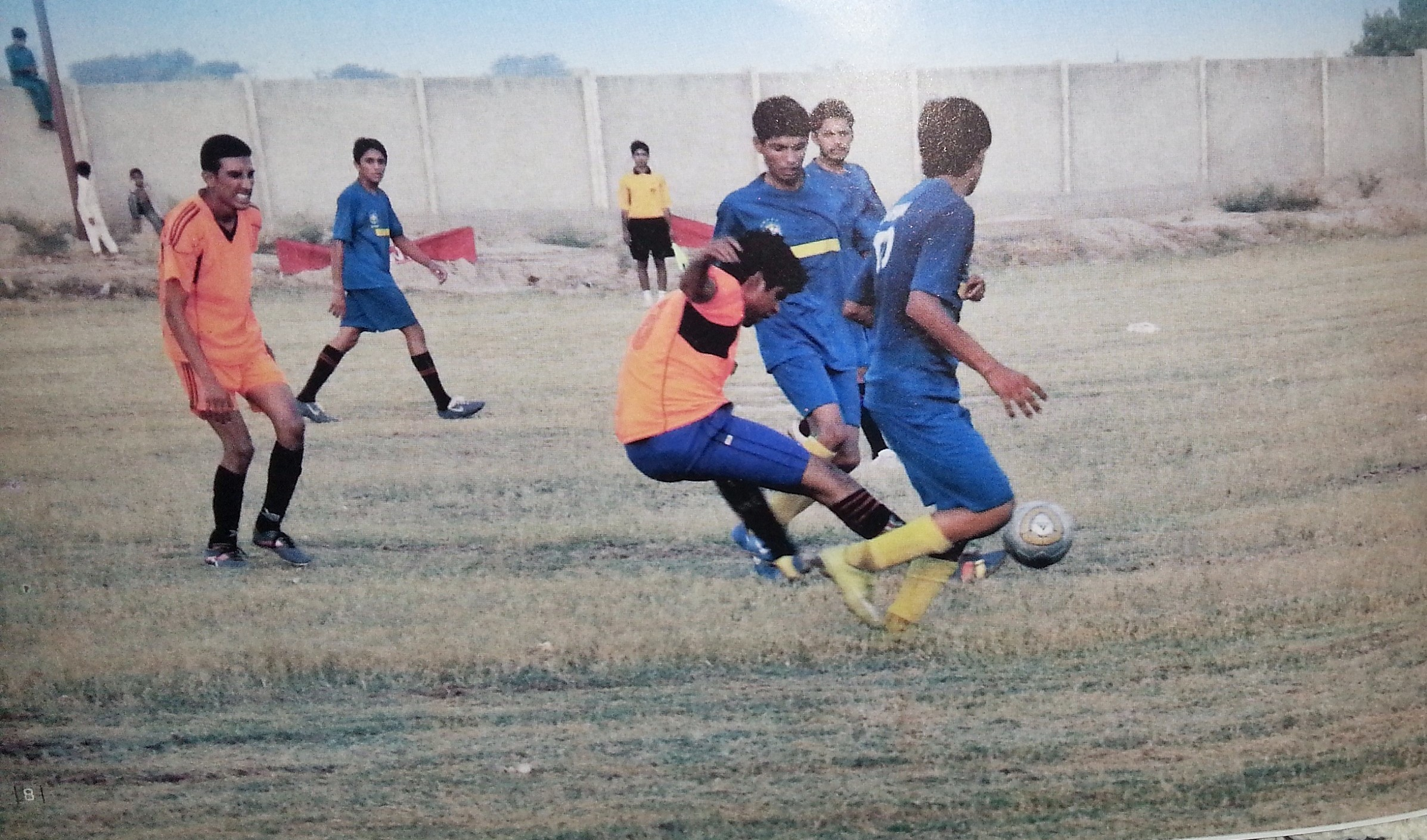

This program was started in 2009. F.Sc. (Pre-Agriculture) 2-year programme at UAF Community College in PARS Campus, Jhang Road, near Faisalabad International Airport. After this 2 year degree, students can be admitted to any degree programme offered by the University of Agriculture Faisalabad. Students are selected from all across Punjab.

=== First degree courses ===
- B.Sc.(Hons) Agriculture
- Doctor of Veterinary Medicine (DVM)
- B.Sc. (Hons) Food Science and Technology
- B.Sc.(Hons) Microbiology
- BS (Hons.) Animal Sciences
- BS (Hons.) Dairy Sciences
- B.Sc.(Hons) Agricultural Engineering
- B.Sc.(Hons) Environmental Engineering
- B.Sc.(Hons) Energy System Engineering
- B.Sc.(Hons) Food Engineering
- B.Sc.(Hons) Textile Technology
- B.Sc.(Hons) (Home Economics
- BS Information Technology
- BS Computer Science
- BS Software Engineering
- BS Bioinformatics
- BS (Chemistry)
- BS (Bio-Chemistry)
- BS (Botany)
- BS (Physics)
- BS (Zoology)
- Bachelor of Business administration (BBA)
- Doctor of Pharmacy (D.Pharma)
- B.Sc.(Hons) Human Nutrition and Dietetics
- B.Sc.(Hons) Agriculture and Resource Economics
- BS Agricultural Biotechnology

=== Postgraduate degree programmes ===
- M.Sc./M.Sc. (Hons.) four semesters, offered in 35 subjects, after completing a first degree course.
- M.Phil. in pure science, four semesters, offered in five subjects after completing M.Sc. in the relevant subject.
- Ph.D., offered in 28 subjects, four semesters, after completing M.Sc. in the relevant subject.

The university offers evening courses: M.B.A. (Regular and Executive), M.Com. and M.Sc. Chemistry, Bio-Chemistry, Botany, Zoology, Physics, Fibre Technology, Home Economics (Food and Nutrition), Statistics and Computer Science.

=== Diploma and certificate courses ===
The university provides training facilities in agriculture and allied disciplines for in-service, pre-service and self-employed personnel, farmers, and others interested in agriculture. Separate courses are provided for ladies on the subjects and skills peculiar to womenfolk. The division has 124 courses leading to diplomas and certificates. Most of these courses have a practical bias.

The following diploma courses are offered:

- C.T. Agriculture (boys)
- Diploma in Rural Home Economics (girls)
- Diploma in Arabic
- Mali Class
- Veterinary Assistant Diploma Course
- Diploma in Grain Storage Management
- Postgraduate Diploma Course in Food Science (for Army personnel)
- Agricultural Business Management
- Computer Science
- Pre-release training course (for Army personnel).

== Ranking ==
University rankings

Global – Overall
- QS World: 1 (2023)

Regional – Overall
- QS Asia: 214 (2022)

The university is ranked fourth in Pakistan and first in the field of Agriculture and Veterinary Sciences by the Higher Education Commission (Pakistan) (HEC) Ranking in 2015.

== Notable former students ==
- Tariq Aziz, field hockey player
- Syed Hussain Jahania Gardezi, politician, Provincial Minister of Punjab for Agriculture
- Sajjad Haider Gujjar, politician, member of the Provincial Assembly of the Punjab
- Iqrar Ahmad Khan, agricultural scientist and professor of horticulture
- Amir Ali Majid, judge, legal scholar and author
- Sajjad Haider Nadeem, politician, member of the Provincial Assembly of the Punjab
- Chaudhry Ghulam Rasool, educationist and field hockey Olympic player
- Mian Nadeem Riaz, holder of the Professorship in Food Diversity, Director of the Extrusion Technology Program at Texas A&M
- Mohammad Hameed Shahid, short story writer, novelist and literary critic
- Abid Qaiyum Suleri, social policy analyst and development practitioner

== See also ==
- List of Islamic educational institutions
