= Pakistan at the 2018 Winter Olympics =

- Flag of Pakistan
- IOC code: PAK
- NOC: National Olympic Committee of Pakistan
- Website: www.nocpakistan.org

in Pyeongchang, South Korea February 9–25, 2018
- Competitors: 2 in 2 sports
- Flag bearer (opening): Muhammad Karim
- Flag bearer (closing): Muhammad Karim
- Medals: Gold 0 Silver 0 Bronze 0 Total 0

Winter Olympics appearances (overview)
- 2010; 2014; 2018; 2022; 2026

Pakistan sent a delegation to contest at the 2018 Winter Olympics in Pyeongchang, South Korea, from February 9 to 25, 2018. This was Pakistan's third appearance at a Winter Olympic Games. The Pakistani delegation consisted of two athletes: alpine skier Muhammad Karim and cross-country skier Syed Human. As of the close of these Olympics, Pakistan has yet to win a Winter Olympics medal.

== Background ==
The first ski resort in Pakistan was opened in 1958, in the Naltar Valley. It was originally for air force pilots to train, but later opened up to civilians. The Ski Federation of Pakistan was founded in 1990. The 2010 Olympic Games was Pakistan's debut at the Winter Olympics. They first participated at the Summer Olympics in the 1948 Games, and won their first Summer Olympics medal in 1956. Karim was chosen as the flag bearer for the parade of nations during the opening ceremony, and the closing ceremony.

== Alpine skiing ==
Pakistan qualified one male athlete for alpine skiing, Muhammad Karim. This was Karim's second Winter Olympics, his first was the 2014 Olympics in Sochi. He said he was not able to train much in Pakistan due to a lack of snow. In the giant slalom, he finished the first run in 1:27.53 and the second in 1:26.51, for a total time of 2:54.04. He placed 72nd overall, out of 119 competitors (34 athletes did not finish).

Karim also competed in the slalom event, the first Pakistani to do so at the Olympics. During the race, Karim's skis passed on the wrong side of a gate and he was disqualified from the event. After the race he said, "It's so embarrassing for me. I'm so sad about that. Such bad luck."

Athlete	Event	Run 1		Run 2		Total	
Athlete	Event	Time	Rank	Time	Rank	Time	Rank
Muhammad Karim	Men's giant slalom	1:27.53	82	1:26.51	72	2:54.04	72
Muhammad Karim	Men's slalom	DNF					

== Cross-country skiing ==
Pakistan qualified one male cross-country skier, Syed Human. This marked the country's debut in the sport at the Winter Olympics. Human is Kirim's nephew. He gave him advice on training and staying calm during the international competition.

Human is in the Pakistani army in addition to his participation on the national skiing team. The Ski Federation of Pakistan founded a school in his village, the same place Kirim is from. He began training internationally around 2010 and 2011. For these Olympics, Human spent time training in Turkey and Finland, and also traveled to Korea prior to the event. He competed in the men's 15 km freestyle cross-country race. Human finished with a time of 45:19.1, placing 104th in the competition.

=== Distance ===
Athlete	Event	Final		
Athlete	Event	Time	Deficit	Rank
Syed Human	Men's 15 km freestyle	45:19.1	+11:35.2	104

== See also ==
- Pakistan at the 2017 Asian Winter Games
- Pakistan at the 2018 Commonwealth Games
- Pakistan at the 2018 Summer Youth Olympics
