= Sajjad Haider Nadeem =

Pakistani politician

Member of the Provincial Assembly of the Punjab
- In office 15 August 2018 – 14 January 2023
- Constituency: PP-143 Sheikhupura-IX

Personal details
- Party: AP (2025-present)
- Other political affiliations: PMLN (2018-2025)

Sajjad Haider Nadeem is a Pakistani politician who had been a member of the Provincial Assembly of the Punjab from August 2018 till January 2023.

== Early life and education ==
He was born on 28 June 1957 in Sheikhupura, Pakistan.

He received a degree of Bachelor of Science (Hons) from the University of Agriculture Faisalabad in 1984.

== Political career ==
He was elected to the Provincial Assembly of the Punjab as a candidate of Pakistan Muslim League (N) from Constituency PP-143 (Sheikhupura-IX) in the 2018 Pakistani general election.
