= Iqrar Ahmad Khan =

Pakistani horticulturist

Iqrar Ahmad Khan (born 8 December 1950) is a Pakistani agricultural scientist and a professor of Horticulture at the University of Agriculture, Faisalabad in Pakistan.

== Early life and education ==
Iqrar Ahmad Khan was born on 8 December 1950 in Sheikhupura District, Punjab, Pakistan. He received his master's degree from the University of Agriculture, Faisalabad in 1976.

He proceeded to the United States for higher studies and earned his Ph.D. in horticulture from the University of California, Riverside in 1988.

== Career ==
Iqrar Ahmad Khan started his teaching career at the University of Agriculture, Faisalabad, before leaving for the U.S. for higher studies.

Khan has released a potato variety (PARS-70), has pioneered the research on breeding seedless Kinnow (a high-yield mandarin fruit) and discovered two new botanical varieties of wheat. He was author of STED funded Citrus Nursery Project launched at UAF. He was instrumental in developing international/regional mango research program to combat the sudden death of mango.

He served as a Vice Chancellor for the University of Agriculture, Faisalabad from 2008 to 2017. He was appointed to this position due to his extensive experience of 31 years in research and development of agriculture, biology and environment. Prior to this appointment in 2008, he had teaching assignments at seven universities, including six foreign universities.

In 2009, Iqrar Ahmad Khan expressed his opinion in a newspaper interview stating that during the regime of General Ayub Khan in the 1960s, Government of Pakistan heavily invested in agriculture which resulted in a 'green revolution' in Pakistan at that time. He emphasized the need for a similar focus on the Pakistani farmer once again.

In the same above interview in 2009, he also was reportedly quoted as saying, "A university has to be a global player. It must prepare students for a global market. We will have to be the role models. We plan to give admission to students after matriculation, which will surely be a revolutionary step. I believe agriculture development and rural development can eradicate poverty."

In a 2017 interview to a major Pakistani newspaper, he reportedly said, "It is a matter of grave concern that farmer's son doesn't want to become a farmer due to low profitability, heavy post-harvest losses, marketing and other challenges."

== Positions held ==
- Founder/Director, Center for Agricultural Biochemistry and Biotechnology, Pakistan (1996 – 1997)
- Director-General, Pakistan Atomic Energy Commission (PAEC), Islamabad, Pakistan (2005 – 2007)
- Chief Scientist/Director, Nuclear Institute for Agriculture and Biology, Faisalabad, Pakistan (2005 – 2007)
- Fellow, Pakistan Academy of Sciences (elected in 2007)

== Awards and recognition ==
- Sitara-i-Imtiaz (Star of Excellence) Award by the President of Pakistan in 2012
- In 2015, the French Government decorated Prof Dr Iqrar Ahmad Khan with highest French Civil Award Ordre des Palmes Académiques to recognize his services in Agriculture and Education.
- Hilal-i-Imtiaz Award by the President of Pakistan in 2024
