= Abid Qaiyum Suleri =

Abid Qaiyum Suleri عابد قيوم سليرى(Urdu)
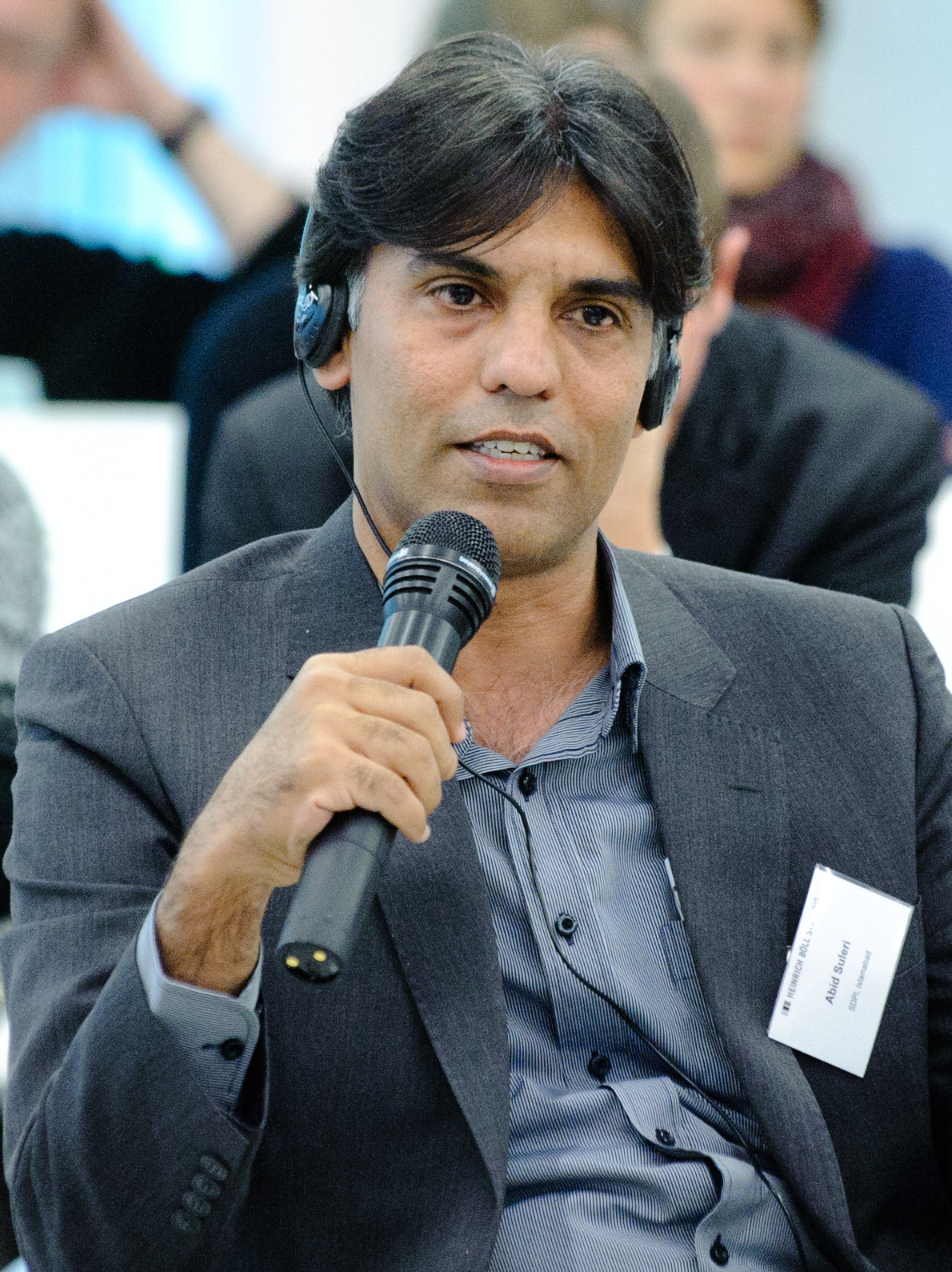
- Abid Qaiyum Suleri, 2010
- Born: 9 September 1969 (age 57); Pakistan
- Education: University of Agriculture, Faisalabad; Natural Resources Institute, University of Greenwich
- Scientific career
- Fields: Food Security; Climate Change; Sustainable Development Goals; Non Traditional Security Issues; International Trade; South Asian Economic Integration
- Workplaces: Executive Director, Sustainable Development Policy Institute

Abid Qaiyum Suleri (born 9 September 1969) is a Pakistani social policy analyst and development practitioner with a PhD in Food Security from University of Greenwich, UK. He has been the Executive Director of the Sustainable Development Policy Institute since 2007. Suleri gives policy advice and serves on various policy forums/advisory boards at national, regional, and international levels. Currently he is a member of the Prime Minister's Economic Advisory Council; member of the National Advisory Committee of Planning Commission of Pakistan; and of Trade Policy Advisory Committee, Government of Pakistan. He serves on Board of Studies of various universities and also a member of Government of Punjab Vice Chancellor's search committee for Agricultural Universities in Punjab.

He has also served as Member of Finance Minister's Special Task Force on Effectiveness of Social Safety Nets; member Board of Management of Pakistan State Oil (PSO), and chaired Board Audit and Finance Committee of PSO from 2010 to 2012; member Lahore High Court's Climate Change Commission formed for effective implementation of Climate Change Policy; served on National Advisory Committee of USAID funded Pakistan Strategic Support Program; and on Islamabad Environment Commission, a commission constituted by Islamabad High Court to prevent further destruction and degradation of the environment of Islamabad.

He writes on political economy in Pakistani newspapers.

He has researched issues such as resilient livelihoods, food insecurity, regional trade, CPEC, and political economy of development. His other research interests include natural resources management, climate change, institutional reforms, and non-traditional security issues.
