= Habib Ali Kiddie =

Pakistani field hockey player

Personal information
- Born: 7 December 1929 Delhi, British India
- Died: 1987 at age 58
Medal record
Men's field hockey
Representing Pakistan
Olympic Games
Gold medal – first place	1960 Rome	Team competition
Silver medal – second place	1956 Melbourne	Team competition
Asian Games
Gold medal – first place	1962 Jakarta	Team competition

Habib Ali Kiddie (7 December 1929 – 1987) was a Pakistani field hockey player from 1950 to 1964. He was considered a legendary left-half. He played in the Pakistan national team at the 1952, 1956 and 1960 Summer Olympics, winning the gold medal in 1960 and the silver medal in 1956. Habib Ali Kiddie died in 1987 at the age of 58.
