= Pakistan at the 2010 Winter Olympics =

- IOC code: PAK
- NOC: National Olympic Committee of Pakistan
- Website: www.nocpakistan.org

in Vancouver
- Competitors: 1 in 1 sport
- Flag bearer: Muhammad Abbas
- Medals: Gold 0 Silver 0 Bronze 0 Total 0

Winter Olympics appearances (overview)
- 2010; 2014; 2018; 2022; 2026

Pakistan competed in the Winter Olympic Games for the first time at the 2010 Winter Olympics in Vancouver, Canada. Pakistani skier Muhammad Abbas raced in the men's giant slalom, placing 79th. Abbas was also the country's flag bearer in the opening and closing ceremonies.

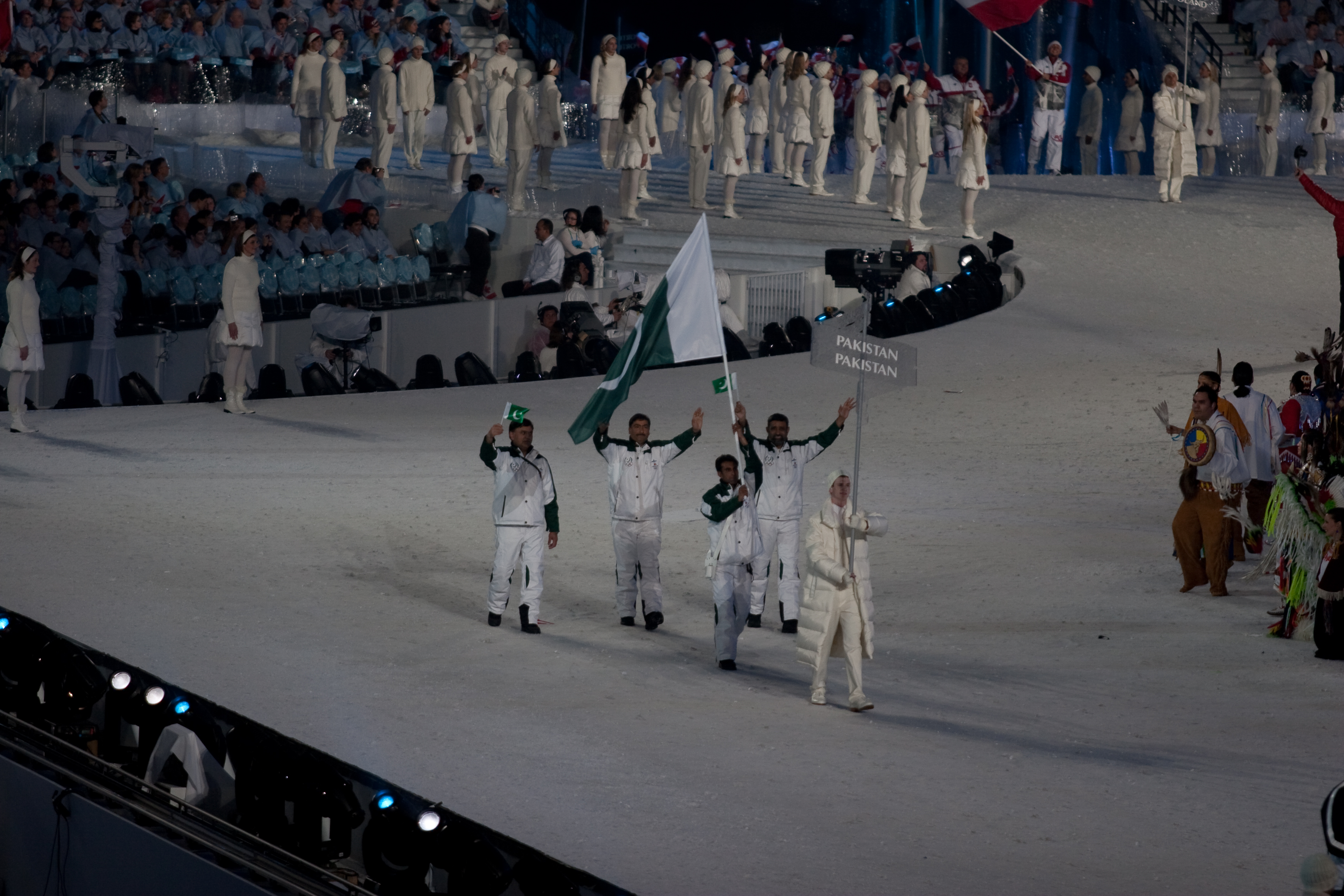
The athletes entering the stadium during the opening ceremonies.

== Background ==
The first ski resort in Pakistan was opened in 1958, in the Naltar Valley. It was originally for air force pilots to train, but later opened up to civilians. The Ski Federation of Pakistan was founded in 1990. The 2010 Olympic Games was Pakistan's debut at the Winter Olympics. They first participated at the Summer Olympics in the 1948 Games, and won their first Summer Olympics medal in 1956.

The country's sole athlete, alpine skier Muhammad Abbas, carried the country's flag at both the opening and closing ceremonies.

== Alpine skiing ==
Muhammad Abbas was Pakistan's first Winter Olympic athlete, competing in the giant slalom. He trained for two weeks in 2008 and six weeks in Austria in 2009, training under an Austrian coach. The slope he trains on in Pakistan is about 500 meters long, with a 100 meter elevation change. The Olympics were his first competition of 2010, since he did not have money to compete in other contests. The Ski Federation of Pakistan considered spending approximately $7000 on his training, but decided to save that money for future skiers.

The event was supposed to start on February 21, but was postponed two days to allow for the men's super combined to take place. Abbas finished the first run in 1:38.27, placing 87th on that run. On his second run, he completed the event in 1:42.31 in 79th place. His total time was 3:20.58, for 79th place overall, out of 81 competitors that finished the event.

Athlete	Event	Run 1	Rank	Run 2	Rank	Total	Rank
Muhammad Abbas	Men's giant slalom	1:38.27	87	1:42.31	79	3:20.58	79
