= Pakistan at the 2022 Winter Olympics =

- Flag of Pakistan
- IOC code: PAK
- NOC: National Olympic Committee of Pakistan
- Website: www.nocpakistan.org

in Beijing, China 4–20 February 2022
- Competitors: 1 (1 man) in 1 sport
- Flag bearer (opening): Muhammad Karim
- Flag bearer (closing): Muhammad Karim
- Medals: Gold 0 Silver 0 Bronze 0 Total 0

Winter Olympics appearances (overview)
- 2010; 2014; 2018; 2022; 2026

Pakistan competed at the 2022 Winter Olympics in Beijing, China, from 4 to 20 February 2022.

Pakistan's delegation consisted of one male alpine skier, who was accompanied by his coach and two officials.

Muhammad Karim was the country's flagbearer during the opening and closing ceremonies.

== Competitors ==
The following is the list of number of competitors participating at the Games per sport/discipline.

Sport	Men	Women	Total
Alpine skiing	1	0	1
Total	1	0	1

== Alpine skiing ==
By meeting the basic qualification standards, Pakistan qualified one male and one female alpine skier. Mia Nuriah Freudweiler was the female skier but had to withdraw due to injury so only the male quota was accepted. Muhammad Karim competed in his third consecutive Winter Olympics.

Athlete	Event	Run 1		Run 2		Total	
Athlete	Event	Time	Rank	Time	Rank	Time	Rank
Muhammad Karim	Men's slalom	DNF		Did not advance			

== See also ==
- Pakistan at the 2022 Commonwealth Games
