= Shahid Ali Khan (field hockey) =

Pakistani field hockey player

Personal information
- Born: 26 December 1964 (age 61)
Medal record
Men's field hockey
Representing Pakistan
Olympic Games
Gold medal – first place	1984 Los Angeles	Team competition
Bronze medal – third place	1992 Barcelona	Team competition

Shahid Ali Khan (Urdu: شاہد علی خان) (born 26 December 1964) is a retired field hockey goalkeeper from Pakistan, who won the gold medal with the Men's National Team at the 1984 Summer Olympics in Los Angeles. Eight years later, at the 1992 Olympics, in Barcelona, Spain, he won a bronze medal for his country. He later became the Pakistan's goalkeeping coach.

At the age of 18, at the 1982 Men's Hockey World Cup, Khan saved a penalty stroke during the final of the tournament to ensure Pakistan won its third World Cup title. He was considered a top goalkeeper in field hockey, and was capped 135 times.

== See also ==
- Pakistan Hockey Federation
