= Tariq Aziz (field hockey, born 1938) =

Pakistani field hockey player (born 1938)

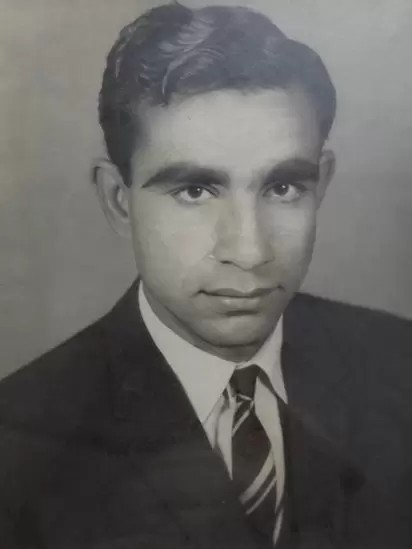
- Tariq Aziz in 1961. Under his captaincy, Pakistan won field hockey tournament during 1968 Summer Olympics.

Personal information
- Nationality: (United Kingdom) British Indian (1938-1947) (Pakistan) Pakistani (1947-Present)
- Born: 5 February 1938 (age 88) Amritsar, British India

Sport
- Sport: Field hockey
- Position: Left-fullback
Medal record
Representing Pakistan
Olympic Games
Silver medal – second place	1964 Tokyo	Team competition
Gold medal – first place	1968 Mexico City	Team competition
Asian Games
Gold medal – first place	1962 Jakarta	Team competition
Silver medal – second place	1966 Bangkok	Team competition

Dr Tariq Aziz (Urdu: طارق عزیز; born 5 February 1938) is a Pakistani former field hockey player. He won a Gold medal at the 1968 Summer Olympics in Mexico City, and a Silver medal at the 1964 Summer Olympics in Tokyo. Aziz was born in Amritsar, British India.

== Education ==
Aziz graduated in 1959 from Lahore-based College of Veterinary Sciences (now University of Veterinary and Animal Sciences). He did his master's (M.Sc.) from the University of Agriculture, Faisalabad (UAF) in 1966. In recognition of his services as teacher, administrator and hockey player as well as managing hockey affairs at divisional and national affairs, he was conferred upon an honorary degree of Doctor of Science by the UAF on 22 October 2022.

== Career ==
He joined the University of Agriculture, Faisalabad, as instructor in 1962 and retired as professor of Veterinary Medicine in 1997.

== Awards and recognition ==
- Pride of Performance Award for Sports by the President of Pakistan in 1968.

== Retirement ==
Aziz announced retirement from international hockey on 31 December 1968.

== Gallery ==
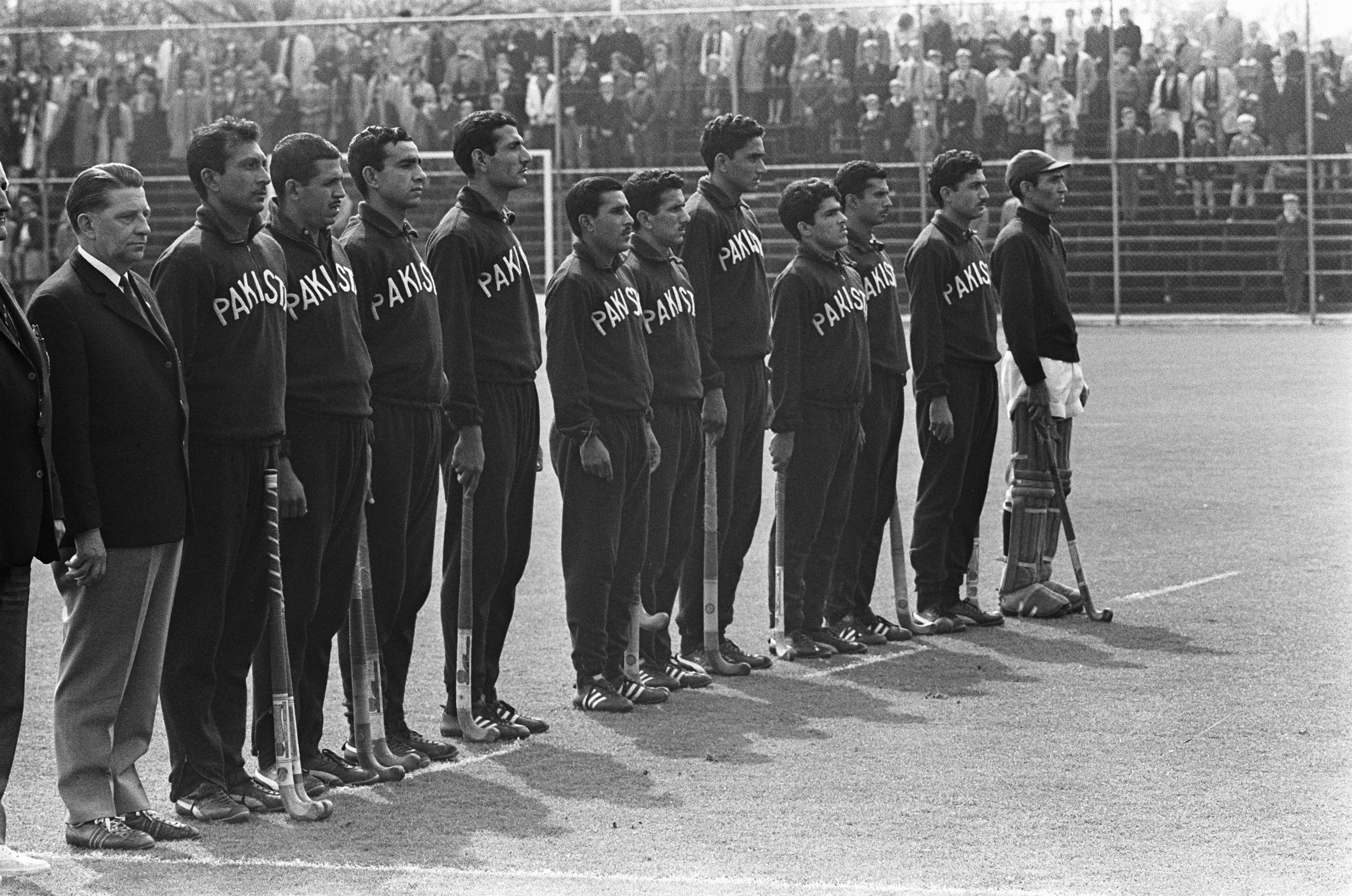
Amstelveen: Pakistan hockey team before match with Netherlands on 8 May 1966 during their visit to the European nation. Olympian Tariq Aziz is fourth from left.
