= Syed Human =

Pakistani cross-country skier (born 1992)

Personal information
- Nationality: Pakistani
- Born: 1 January 1992 (age 34)

Sport
- Sport: Cross-country skiing

Syed Human (born 1 January 1992) is a Pakistani cross-country skier. He competed in the men's 15 kilometre freestyle at the 2018 Winter Olympics.
