= Muhammad Karim (skier) =

Pakistani alpine skier (born 1995)

Personal information
- Born: 1 May 1995 (age 31) Gilgit, Baltistan, Pakistan
- Height: 1.63 m (5 ft 4 in)
- Weight: 64 kg (141 lb)

Muhammad Karim (born 1 May 1995) is a Pakistani alpine skier and a four-time Olympian. He became the second Pakistani to participate in a Winter Olympics when he competed at the 2014 Winter Olympics in Sochi. He participated in the giant slalom event and got a rank of 71. At the 2018 Winter Olympics, he made history as the first Pakistani to compete in the slalom event, while placing 72nd in the giant slalom. He went on to compete in the slalom event at the 2022 Beijing Olympics and the same event at the 2026 Milano Cortina Olympics.

== Career ==
Muhammad Karim grew up in the snowy mountains of Naltar, where resources were scarce. His natural talent was noticed early. In 2006 with the support of the Pakistan Air Force, he was sent to Japan and Austria for professional training. This exposure played a key role in shaping his international career. His first major international appearance came in 2011 at the South Asian Winter Games. Over the years, Muhammad Karim has competed in 53 international events. He has won 11 international medals, including five gold, four silver, and two bronze medals. At the national level, he has secured 28 gold medals. These achievements make him Pakistan’s most successful athlete in winter sports. During the 2013/2014 season, he participated in FIS events held in Iran and Turkey. His best finishes were 13th in giant slalom and 18th in Slalom.

== Winter Olympics ==
=== 2014 Winter Olympics ===
Karim placed 71st out of 109 athletes in the giant slalom event at the Sochi Olympics with a time of 3:27.41

=== 2018 Winter Olympics ===
Karim ranked 72 in the giant slalom event at the PyeongChang Olympics with a time of 2:54.04. He also became the first Pakistani Winter Olympian to compete in the slalom event and registered a DNF.

=== 2022 Winter Olympics ===
Karim competed in the slalom event at the Beijing Olympics and recorded a DNF.

=== 2026 Winter Olympics ===
Pakistan’s sole athlete at the Milano Cortina 2026 Winter Olympics, Muhammad Karim, failed to complete his first run in the men’s Alpine skiing slalom at the Stelvio Ski Centre, registering a DNF and ending his campaign early.

== Asian Winter Games ==
=== 2017 Asian Winter Games ===
In 2017, he was named to Pakistan's Asian Winter Games team. He competed in the alpine skiing slalom and giant slalom events at the 2017 Asian Winter Games.

=== 2025 Asian Winter Games ===
Karim represented Pakistan at the 2025 Asian Winter Games in the Men's slalom event.

== Flag bearer ==
Muhammad Karim has carried the Pakistani flag at four Olympic Games, the most by any Pakistani Olympian in both the Winter and Summer Olympics. He was the flag bearer for Pakistan in the opening and closing ceremonies of the 2014, 2018, 2022 and 2026 Winter Olympics. He was also the country's opening ceremony flagbearer at the 2025 Asian Winter Games.

== See also ==
- List of flag bearers for Pakistan at the Olympics
- Pakistan at the 2014 Winter Olympics
- Pakistan at the 2018 Winter Olympics
- Pakistan at the 2022 Winter Olympics
- Pakistan at the 2026 Winter Olympics
- Pakistan at the 2017 Asian Winter Games
- Pakistan at the 2025 Asian Winter Games
