= Chaudhry Ghulam Rasool =

Pakistani educationalist and field hockey player

- Chaudhry Ghulam Rasool by Ahmet Abdulaziz (2016)

Personal information
- Born: 1 May 1931 Amritsar, Punjab, British India
- Died: 24 December 1991 (aged 60) Lahore, Punjab, Pakistan
- Resting place: Ichhra Graveyard, Lahore
Medal record
Men's field hockey
Representing Pakistan
Olympic Games
Silver medal – second place	1956 Melbourne	Team competition
Gold medal – first place	1960 Rome	Team competition
Asian Games
Gold medal – first place	1958 Tokyo	Team competition
Gold medal – first place	1962 Jakarta	Team competition

Chaudhry Ghulam Rasul (1 May 1931 – 24 December 1991) was a Pakistani educationist as well as a field hockey Olympian. After Partition, his family migrated from Amritsar to Lyallpur but later settled in Lahore. Rasool was an integral part of the Pakistani field hockey team from 1956 through 1963.

== Education and career ==
Chaudhry Ghulam Rasool studied at Punjab Agricultural College, Lyallpur from 1948 to 1954 and obtained his MSc degree in Agriculture. He began his teaching career as a lecturer at Aitchison College, Lahore, but soon joined Rehabilitation Department where he worked as Deputy Settlement Commissioner. Later, he received his master's degree from Kansas State University and completed a PhD degree within three years at the University of Wisconsin, returning to Pakistan to join as Principal of Aitchison College, Lahore. Later, he was appointed Vice-chancellor of University of Agriculture, Faisalabad for three years. Thereafter, he joined the Punjab Agriculture Development Corporation as a managing director. This was followed by his appointment as Secretary of the Punjab Animal Care Department in Pakistan. He retired as Secretary of the Agriculture Department in Punjab. During all these years, Rasool also represented Pakistan in numerous international conferences, seminars, and delegations. Rasool was also the Honorary Secretary of Pakistan Association of Science and was the first Asian ever to receive the International Alumni Medallion Award from Kansas State University, which was called the 'Life Achievement Award'. He was recipient of a number of distinctions and "Gold Medals".

== As a sportsman (1956–63) ==
Rasool was a member of the Punjab University hockey team in the 1950s. Later, he was included in the Pakistan national hockey team and played many international matches. He was a member of the team at the Melbourne Olympics in 1956 where Pakistan won the Olympic silver medal. Two years later, he was a member of the Pakistan hockey team at the Asian Games in Tokyo which won gold medal. In 1960, Rasool was a member of the Pakistan hockey team at the Rome Olympics which won an Olympic gold medal by defeating the arch-rival India in the final. In 1962, Rasool was again a member of the Pakistan hockey team that participated in the Asian Games, held in Jakarta. Pakistan again won the gold medal, defeating India in the final. After retirement from active hockey, Rasool served the Pakistan Hockey Federation Selection Committee as chairman.

== Awards and recognition ==
- Pride of Performance Award by the President of Pakistan in 1970

== Olympic family relation(s) ==
One of his sons, Akhtar Rasool was also an Olympic hockey player. He captained the Pakistan Hockey Team in the 1982 World Cup competition and won a gold medal for Pakistan by defeating India in the finals.
