= Akhtar Rasool =

Field hockey player from Pakistan

Personal information
- Native name: اختر رسول
- Born: 13 January 1954 (age 72) Faisalabad, Punjab, Pakistan
Medal record
Men's field hockey
Representing Pakistan
Olympic Games
Silver medal – second place	1972 Munich	Team
Bronze medal – third place	1976 Montreal	Team
Asian Games
Gold medal – first place	1974 Tehran	Team
Gold medal – first place	1978 Bangkok	Team
World Cup
Gold medal – first place	1971 Barcelona	Team
Silver medal – second place	1975 Kuala Lumpur	Team
Gold medal – first place	1978 Buenos Aires	Team
Gold medal – first place	1982 Bombay	Team

Akhtar Rasool (born 13 January 1954) (Urdu: اختر رسول) is a politician and former field hockey player, national hockey team captain and Olympian from Pakistan who won the gold medal with the men's national hockey team at the Hockey World Cup 1978, and again in 1982. He played as center half for the national team. Akhtar was notable for his abilities in centre-half recovery and ball distribution.

== Background and education ==
Akhtar Rasool was born in Faisalabad District of Pakistan, formerly known as Lyallpur. His father was Chaudhry Ghulam Rasool who was himself an accomplished hockey Olympian as well as a prominent teacher. Akhtar graduated from Government College Lahore. During his college days, Akhtar was the captain of his college hockey team. He was awarded "Roll of Honor" and "College Color" for his excellent performance in hockey.

== Career ==
Akhtar was noted for his clean playing style and performance, and was first included on the Pakistani national hockey team in 1971. From 1971 till 1982, Akhtar played numerous national and international matches.

He played a prominent role in Pakistan's victories in 1978 and 1982 Hockey World Cup. In 1982, Akhtar captained the Pakistani team for the Hockey World Cup Championship held in Bombay and won a gold medal for Pakistan by defeating West Germany in the finals.

After the Bombay Hockey World Cup, Akhtar retired as captain of the side which had won the gold in 1982. By then, he held the distinction of being the only player to have played in four World Cups.

Akhtar also played in the 1972 Summer Olympics held at Munich and the 1976 Summer Olympics held at Montreal and won silver and bronze medals in 1972 and 1976, respectively.

He was also awarded the highest civil award, the Pride of Performance, by the Pakistani Government in 1983.

After his retirement from professional hockey, he was elected as the President of Pakistan's hockey supreme body the Pakistan Hockey Federation (PHF). This was to be only for a term of one year. He took over at a time when the PHF was bankrupt and had just gotten out of the 1996 players revolt just before the world cup. He worked diligently and was elected for another term as the president. He then served as the chairman of the selection committee in the year 2002.

Akhtar Rasool was elected unopposed as the president of the Pakistan Hockey Federation in 2013 but could not perform as well as expected this time. "Pakistan had secured eighth position in the qualifying event for the Olympics held in Belgium and as a result failed to qualify for the 2016 Olympic Games. It was the first time in the game's history that Pakistan missed out on a spot at the Olympics."

== Awards and recognition ==
In 1983, Akhtar was awarded Pride of Performance, the highest civil award by the Pakistani Government, in recognition of his contributions to Pakistani hockey.

== In active politics ==
After retirement from active hockey, Akhtar entered politics in 1985. He contested as an independent and was elected MPA to Punjab Assembly. In 1986, he became Excise and Taxation Minister of Punjab. In 1988, he was elected from P.P 128 Ichhra on Islami Jamhuri Itihad ticket and became the Sports Minister of Punjab. In 1990, he again contested on Islami Jamhoori Ittehad party ticket and was elected MLA with a big margin. In 1993, he contested Parliament seat on Muslim League ticket and became MPA (Member of Provincial Assembly).
