= Muhammad Abbas (skier) =

Pakistani alpine skier

Personal information
- Born: 16 February 1986 (age 40) Gilgit, Pakistan

Skiing career
- Sport: Alpine skiing
- Disciplines: Giant slalom

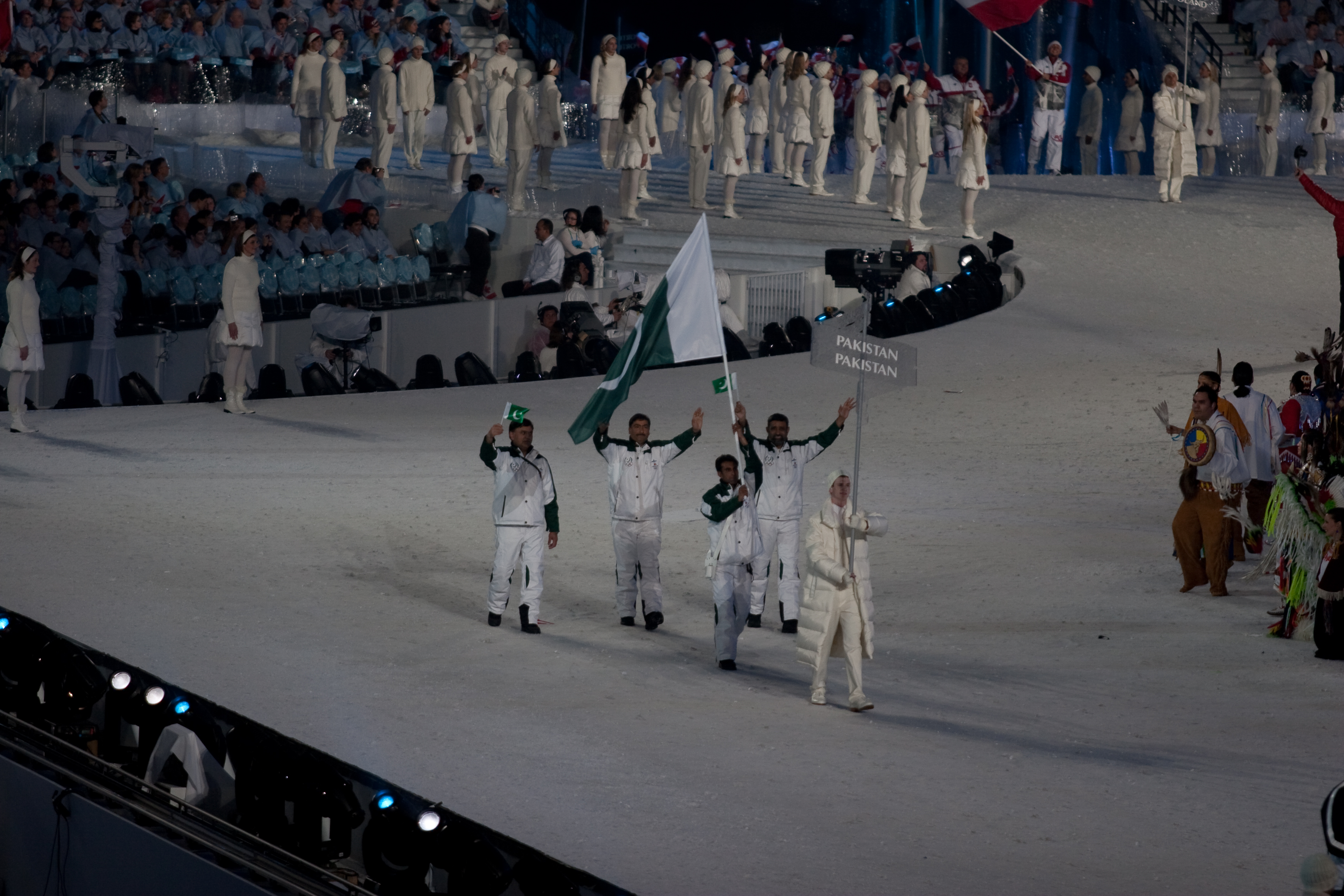
The athletes from Pakistan entering the stadium at the opening ceremonies of the 2010 Winter Olympics

Muhammad Abbas (Urdu: محمد عباس), (born 16 February 1986) is a Pakistani alpine skier who was his nation's first competitor at the Winter Olympic Games, in 2010. Muhammad Abbas was not expected to win any medal, but he outraced some of the other debuting skiers. A group said to be particularly interested were Pakistani Canadians.

Abbas was raised in a small village in Northern Pakistan, and his first pair of skis were carved out of wood by his father. He was discovered at age 8 by a Pakistan Air Force officer (Group Captain(R) Zahid Farooq) who remains his coach. Abbas works for the Air Force, his only assignment being skiing.

== Career ==
=== 2010 ===
In the 2010 Winter Olympics he competed in the Men's giant slalom event. Out of the 103 skiers he finished 79th with a time of 1:38.27 in the first run and 1:42.31 in the second run, for a total time of 3:20.58, which was 42.75 seconds off the pace.

=== 2011 ===
Abbas participated in the 2011 South Asian Winter Games held in India in January.

== See also ==
- Pakistan at the 2010 Winter Olympics
