= Field hockey at the 1976 Summer Olympics – Men's team squads =

List of hockey players

The following is the list of squads that took place in the men's field hockey tournament at the 1976 Summer Olympics.

== Group A ==
=== Argentina ===
The following players represented Argentina:

Coach: Mario Ranalli

1. Julio César Cufre
2. Jorge Sabbione
3. Jorge Disera
4. Jorge Ruiz
5. Marcelo Pazos
6. Osvaldo Zanni
7. Jorge Ivorra
8. Luis Antonio Costa
9. Marcelo Garrafo
10. Flavio de Giacomi
11. Fernando Calp
12. Alberto Sabbione
13. Daniel Portugués
14. Alfredo Quaquarini
15. Gustavo Paolucci
16. César Raguso

=== Australia ===
The following players represented Australia:

Coach: Mervyn Adams

1. Robert Haigh
2. Ric Charlesworth
3. David Bell
4. Greg Browning
5. Ian Cooke
6. Barry Dancer
7. Douglas Golder
8. Wayne Hammond
9. Jim Irvine
11. Malcolm Poole
12. Bob Proctor
13. Graeme Reid
14. Ron Riley
15. Trevor Smith
16. Terry Walsh

=== Canada ===
The following players represented Canada:

Coach: Errol Hartley

1. James MacDougall
2. Sarbjit Singh Dusang
3. David Bissett
4. Alan Hobkirk
5. Reg Plummer
6. Lee Wright
7. Lance Carey
8. Peter Motzek
9. Doug Pready
10. Kelvin Wood
11. Peter Lown
12. Fred Hoos
13. Paul Chohan
14. Mike Mouat
15. Kuldip Singh Gosal
16. Antoine Schouten

=== India ===
The following players represented India:

Coach: Gurbaksh Singh

1. Ajit Pal Singh
2. Vadivelu Phillips
3. Baldev Singh
4. Ashok Diwan
5. Govinda Billimogaputtaswamy
6. Ashok Kumar
7. Varinder Singh
8. Harcharan Singh
9. Mohinder Singh
10. Aslam Sher Khan
11. Syed Ali
12. Bir Bahadur Chettri
13. Chand Singh
14. Ajit Singh
15. Surjit Singh
16. Vasudevan Bhaskaran

=== Malaysia ===
The following players represented Malaysia:

Coach: Mohamed Sidek Othman Encik

1. Khair-ud-Din bin Zainal
2. Azaari Mohamed Zain
3. Sri Shanmuganathan
4. Francis Belavantheran
5. Lam Kok Meng
6. Mohinder Singh Amar
7. Wong Choon Hin
8. Balasingam Singaram
9. Nallasamy Padanisamy
10. Rengasamy Ramakrishnan
11. Murugesan Mahendran
12. Avtar Singh Gill
13. Anthony Cruz
14. Poon Fook Loke
15. Ramalingam Pathmarajah
16. Ow Soon Kooi

=== Netherlands ===
The following players represented the Netherlands:

Coach: Wim van Heunen

1. Maarten Sikking
2. André Bolhuis
3. Tim Steens
4. Geert van Eijk
5. Theo Doyer
6. Coen Kranenberg
7. Rob Toft
8. Wouter Leefers
9. Hans Jorritsma
10. Hans Kruize
11. Jan Albers
12. Paul Litjens
13. Imbert Jebbink
14. Ron Steens
15. Bart Taminiau
16. Wouter Kan

== Group B ==
=== Belgium ===
The following players represented Belgium:

Coach: (West Germany) Ernst Willig

1. Frank Smissaert
2. Guy Miserque
4. Serge Dubois
5. Bernard Smeekens
6. Bernard Mauchien
7. Paul Urbain
8. Armand Solie
9. Michel Vanderborght
10. Carl-Eric Vanderborght
11. Robert Maroye
12. Bruno De Clynsen
13. Jean-François Gilles
14. Jean Toussaint
15. Michel Van Tuyckom
16. Jean-Claude Moraux

=== New Zealand ===
The following players represented New Zealand:

Coach: Ross Gillespie

1. Paul Ackerley
2. Jeff Archibald
3. Arthur Borren
4. Alan Chesney
5. John Christensen
6. Greg Dayman
7. Tony Ineson
8. Alan McIntyre
10. Barry Maister
11. Selwyn Maister
12. Trevor Manning
13. Arthur Parkin
14. Mohan Patel
15. Ramesh Patel

=== Pakistan ===
The following players represented Pakistan:

Coach: Saeed Anwar

1. Salim Sherwani
2. Manzoor-ul Hassan
3. Munawaruz Zaman
4. Saleem Nazim
5. Akhtar Rasool
6. Iftikhar Ahmed Syed
7. Islah-ud-Din
8. Manzoor Hussain
9. Abdul Rashid
10. Shahnaz Sheikh
11. Samiullah
12. Qamar Zia
13. Arshad Mahmood
14. Arshad Ali Chaudry
15. Mudassar Asghar
16. Hanif Khan

=== Spain ===
The following players represented Spain:

Coach: (West Germany) Horst Wein

1. Luis Carrera
2. Juan Amat
3. Jaime Arbós
4. Juan Arbós
5. Ricardo Cabot
6. Juan Colomer
7. Francisco Codina
8. Agustín Churruca
9. Francisco Fábregas
10. Jorge Fábregas
11. Agustín Masaña
12. Juan Pellón
13. Ramón Quintana
14. José Sallés
15. Francisco Segura
16. Luis Antonio Twose

=== West Germany ===
The following players represented West Germany:

Coach: Klaus Kleiter

1. Wolfgang Rott
2. Klaus Ludwiczak
3. Michael Peter
4. Dieter Freise
5. Fritz Schmidt
6. Michael Krause
7. Horst Dröse
8. Werner Kaessmann
9. Uli Vos
10. Peter Caninenberg
11. Peter Trump
12. Hans Montag
13. Wolfgang Strödter
14. Heiner Dopp
15. Rainer Seifert
16. Ralf Lauruschkat
