= India at the 1976 Summer Olympics =

- IOC code: IND
- NOC: Indian Olympic Association

in Montreal
- Competitors: 26 in 5 sports
- Flag bearer: Ajit Pal Singh
- Medals: Gold 0 Silver 0 Bronze 0 Total 0

Summer Olympics appearances (overview)
- 1900; 1904–1912; 1920; 1924; 1928; 1932; 1936; 1948; 1952; 1956; 1960; 1964; 1968; 1972; 1976; 1980; 1984; 1988; 1992; 1996; 2000; 2004; 2008; 2012; 2016; 2020; 2024

India competed at the 1976 Summer Olympics in Montreal, Quebec, Canada. This was the first Olympics since 1928 in which the Indian Men's hockey team did not win an Olympic Medal.

== Competitors ==
Sports	Men	Women	Total	Events
Athletics	4	0	4	4
Boxing	2	0	2	2
Field hockey	16	0	16	1
Shooting	3	0	3	2
Weightlifting	1	0	1	1
Total	26	0	26	10

== Results by event ==
=== Athletics ===
Men's 800 metres

- Sriram Singh

- Heat — 1:45.86
- Semi Final — 1:46.42
- Final — 1:45.77 (→ 7th place)

Men's 10.000 metres

- Hari Chand

- Heat — 28:48.72 (→ did not advance)

Men's Long Jump

- T. C. Yohannan

- Heat — 7.67m (→ did not advance)

Men's Marathon

- Shivnath Singh — 2:16:22 (→ 11th place)

=== Boxing ===
- S. K. Rai (Featherweight) – lost first round
- C. C. Machaiah (Light Welterweight) – lost first round

=== Field hockey ===
==== Men's team competition ====
- Team roster

- ( 1.) Ajitpal Singh
- ( 2.) Vadivelu Phillips
- ( 3.) Baldev Singh
- ( 4.) Ashok Diwan
- ( 5.) Billimoga Govinda
- ( 6.) Ashok Kumar
- ( 7.) Varinder Singh
- ( 8.) Harcharan Singh
- ( 9.) Mohinder Singh
- (10.) Aslam Sher Khan
- (11.) Syed Ali
- (12.) Bir Bhadur Chettri
- (13.) Chand Singh
- (14.) Ajit Singh
- (15.) Surjit Singh
- (16.) Vasudevan Baskaran

- Head coach: Gurbux Singh

==== Preliminary round ====
===== Group A =====
Pos	Team	Pld	W	D	L	GF	GA	GD	Pts	Qualification
1	Netherlands	5	5	0	0	11	3	+8	10	Semi-finals
2	Australia	5	3	0	2	14	6	+8	6 (Note: Australia and India finished on equal points at the conclusion of the pool stage, resulting in a match to determine second place in the pool. The match was contested on 26 July 1976 and Australia won 5–4 after a penalty shoot-out.)	Semi-finals
3	India	5	3	0	2	12	9	+3	6	
4	Malaysia	5	2	0	3	3	7	−4	4	
5	Canada (H)	5	1	0	4	4	11	−7	2	
6	Argentina	5	1	0	4	4	12	−8	2	

Source: Olympedia
(H) Hosts
Notes:

18 July 1976
10:00

India	4–0	Argentina
Ajit 1', 66'; Chand 17'; Surjit 49'	Report

Umpires:
Francis Steurs (BEL)
Osvaldo Pensosi (ITA)

19 July 1976
15:00

Netherlands	3–1	India
Kruize 31'; Litjens 47', 48'	Report	Philips 37'

Umpires:
Louis-Michel Gillet (FRA)
Graham Nash (GBR)

21 July 1976
15:00

Australia	6–1	India
Riley 13', 30', 50'; Browning 26'; Irvine 45'; Smith 54'	Report	Surjit 21'

Umpires:
Alain Renaud (FRA)
Fritz Seegers (FRG)

22 July 1976
10:00

India	3–0	Canada
Ajit 10'; Philips 47', 69'	Report

Umpires:
Jaime Salvatella (ESP)
Mohamed Abdel Gomaa (EGY)

24 July 1976
10:00

India	3–0	Malaysia
Ashok 4', 16'; Surjit 60'	Report

Umpires:
Graham Nash (GBR)
Peter Jackson (GBR)

26 July 1976
13:00

Australia	1–1 (a.e.t.)	India
Charlesworth 33'	Report	Surjit 34'
Penalties
Bell (penalty shoot-out scored); Haigh (penalty shoot-out scored); Walsh (penalty shoot-out scored); Smith (penalty shoot-out scored); Charlesworth (penalty shoot-out scored)	5–4	(penalty shoot-out scored) Surjit; (penalty shoot-out scored) Ajit Pal; (penalty shoot-out scored) Ashok; (penalty shoot-out missed) Ajit; (penalty shoot-out scored) Philips

Umpires:
Louis-Michel Gillet (FRA)
Peter Paul Lathouwers (NED)

=== Fifth to eighth place classification ===
29 July 1976
17:00

India	2–3	West Germany
Mohinder 20'; Ajit Pal 66'	Report	Strödter 38', 62'; Dröse 60'

Umpires:
Richard Jewell (AUS)
Graham Nash (GBR)

==== Seventh place game ====
30 July 1976
10:00

India	2–0	Malaysia
Aslam Sher 55', 59'	Report

Umpires:
Peter Paul Lathouwers (NED)
Bob Davidzon (NED)
