= 1975 Men's Hockey World Cup =

1975 Hockey World Cup
Hoki Piala Dunia 1975 (Malay)
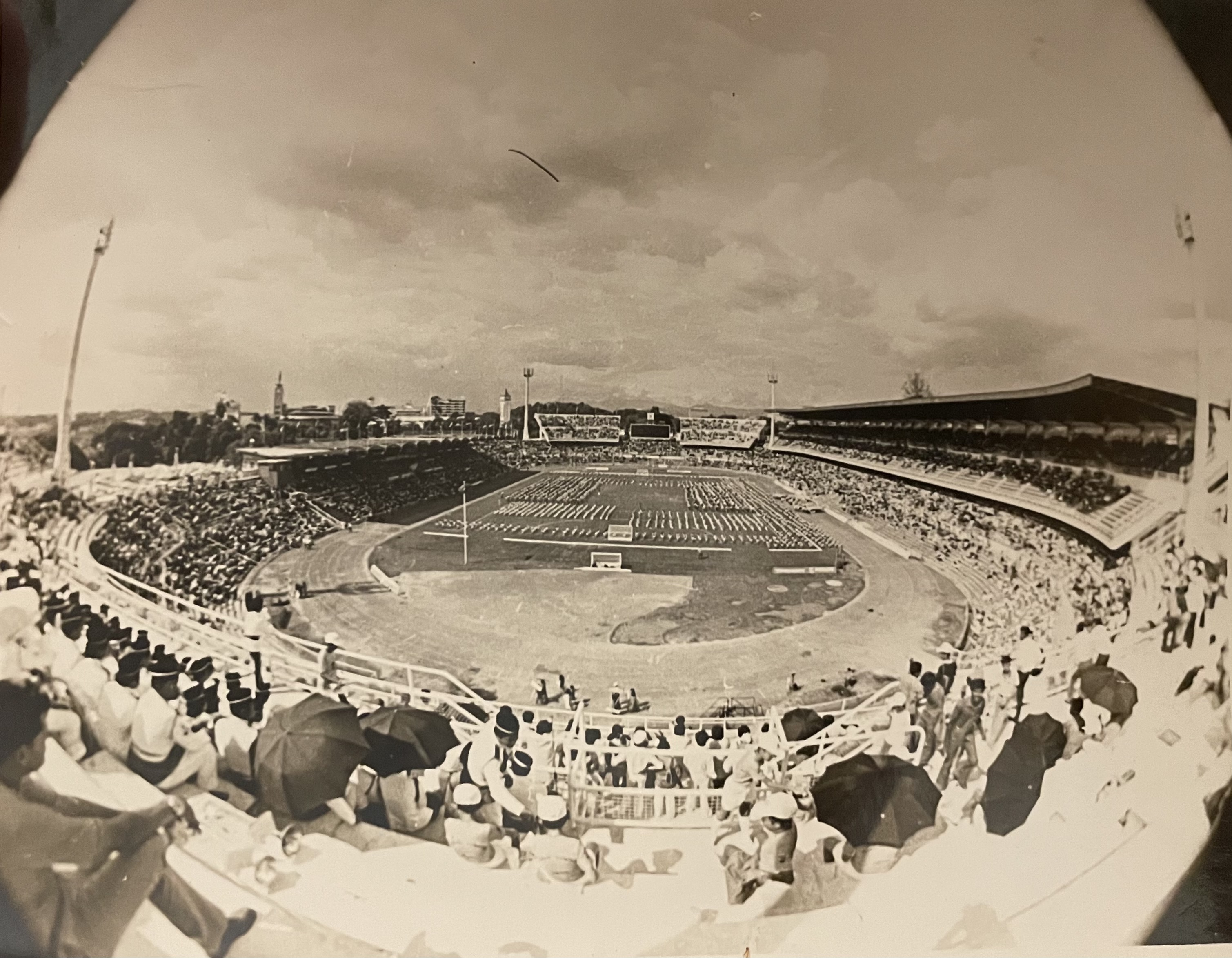
- Merdeka Stadium, Kuala Lumpur 1975

Tournament details
- Host country: Malaysia
- City: Kuala Lumpur
- Dates: 1–15 March 1975
- Teams: 12 (from 5 confederations)
- Venue: Stadium Merdeka

Final positions
- Champions: India (1st title)
- Runner-up: Pakistan
- Third place: West Germany

Tournament statistics
- Matches played: 42
- Goals scored: 175 (4.17 per match)
- Top scorer(s): (Netherlands) Ties Kruize (Pakistan) Manzoor-ul Hassan (Poland) Stefan Otulakowski (7 goals)

The 1975 Hockey World Cup was the third edition of the Hockey World Cup men's field hockey tournament. It was held in Kuala Lumpur, Malaysia. In the final, India defeated Pakistan 2–1. It was the first and only World Cup final between India and Pakistan. It was also the second World Cup final appearance for each team; Pakistan was the winner of the inaugural edition in 1971, and India the runner-up to Netherlands in the 1973 edition. Germany defeated the hosts, Malaysia, 4–0 for third place.

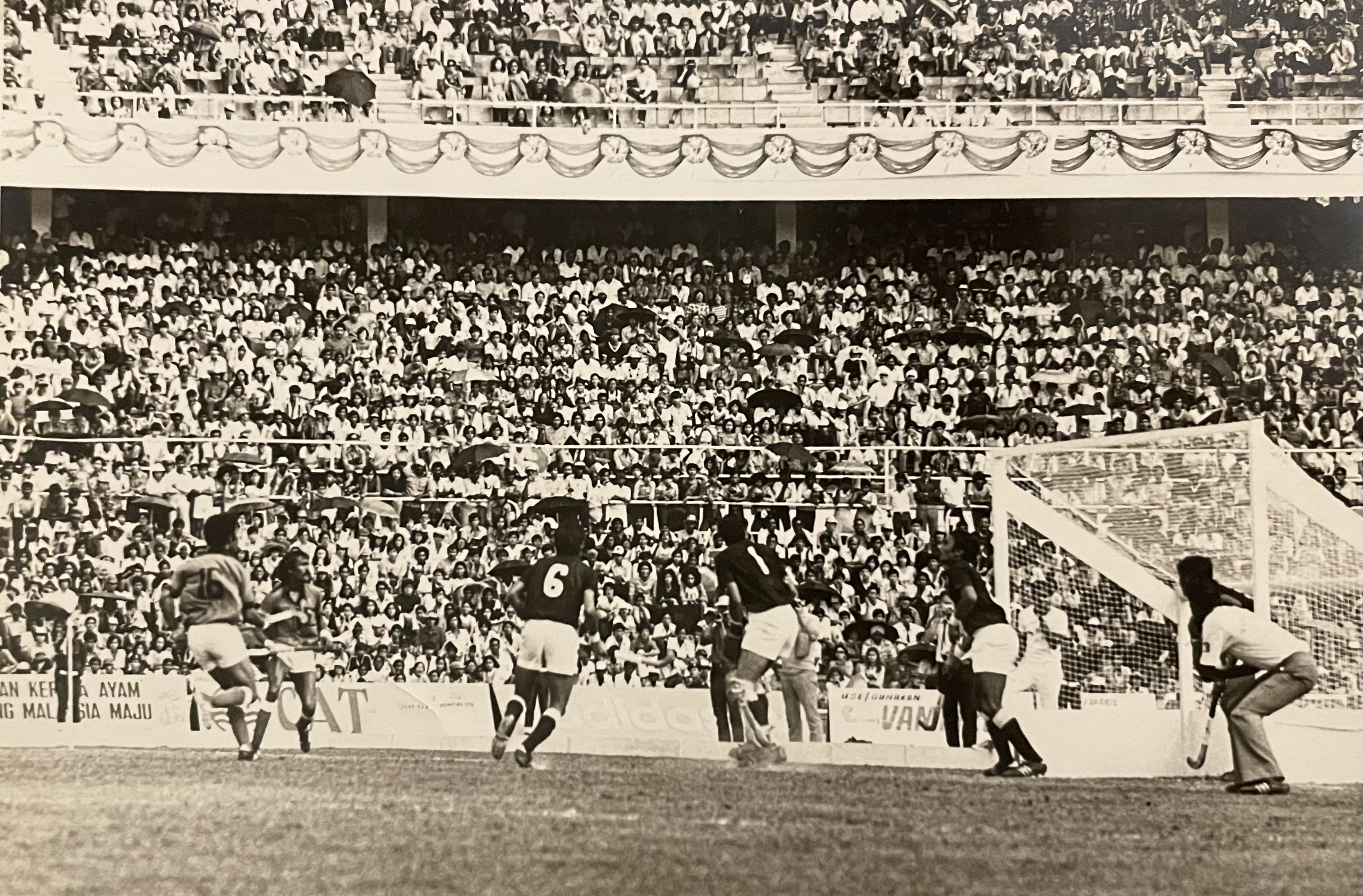
India vs. Pakistan, Hockey World Cup Final, Kuala Lumpur.

== Qualified teams ==
Date	Event	Location	Quotas	Qualifier(s)
Host			1	Malaysia
24 August – 2 September 1973	1973 World Cup	Amstelveen, Netherlands	7	Netherlands; India; West Germany; Pakistan; Spain; England; New Zealand
2 – 11 May 1974	1974 EuroHockey Championship	Madrid, Spain	1	Poland
31 August – 5 September 1974	Pan American qualification tournament	Buenos Aires, Argentina	1	Argentina
October 1974	1974 Africa Cup	Cairo, Egypt	1	Ghana
	Oceania		1	Australia
Total			12	

== Group stage ==
=== Pool A ===
Pos	Team	Pld	W	D	L	GF	GA	GD	Pts	Qualification
1	Pakistan	5	3	2	0	14	6	+8	8	Semifinal
2	Malaysia (H)	5	2	2	1	6	4	+2	6	Semifinal
3	Spain	5	2	1	2	5	9	−4	5 (Note: Spain wins head-to-head against New Zealand)	
4	New Zealand	5	2	1	2	5	6	−1	5	
5	Poland	5	1	1	3	8	13	−5	3 (Note: Poland wins head-to-head against Netherlands)	
6	Netherlands	5	1	1	3	9	9	0	3	

Source: FIH
Rules for classification: 1) points; 2) head-to-head result; 3) goal difference; 4) goals scored.
(H) Hosts

=== Fixtures ===
1 March 1975

Malaysia	0–0	New Zealand
	Report

2 March 1975

Pakistan	2–2	Poland
Hassan 40'; Khan 52'	Report	Otulakowski 4', 60'

City Stadium, Penang

3 March 1975

Malaysia	0–0	Spain
	Report

Stadium Mindef
Umpires:
K. Jamaspian (IRA)

4 March 1975

Netherlands	1–2	New Zealand
T. Kruize 49'	Report	Ineson 39'; Patel 64'

Jalan Raja Muda Stadium

5 March 1975

Spain	4–1	Poland
Amat 16', 26'; Cabot 25'; Borrel 41'	Report	Otulakowski 12'

5 March 1975

Netherlands	3–3	Pakistan
T. Kruize 17', 42'; Boerma 55'	Report	Hassan 20'; Saeed 32'; Rasool 57'

Umpires:
P. H. Jackson
A. Renaud

6 March 1975

Pakistan	2–0	New Zealand
Khan 39'; Saeed 54'	Report

6 March 1975

Malaysia	3–1	Poland
Francis 8'; Shanmuganathan 60'; Mahendran 63'	Report	Otulakowski 26'

Jalan Pantai Ground

7 March 1975

Spain	1–0	New Zealand
Salles 44'	Report

9 March 1975

Netherlands	3–0	Spain
Boerma 45', 69'; Boelaars 64'	Report

9 March 1975

New Zealand	3–2	Poland
Patel 32', 60'; Ineson 66'	Report	Sitek 6'; Mielniczak 20'

9 March 1975

Pakistan	2–1	Malaysia
Saeed 14'; Hassan 68'	Report	Loke 64'

Jalan Raja Muda Stadium

10 March 1975

Pakistan	5–0	Spain
Hassan 21', 55'; Zahid 25'; Azam 36'; Khan 57'	Report

Kilat Club Ground
Umpires:
P. H. Jackson

10 March 1975

Poland	2–1	Netherlands
Otulakowski 52', 62'	Report	T. Kruize 48'

11 March 1975

Malaysia	2–1	Netherlands
Loke 21'; Shanmuganathan 70'	Report	T. Kruize 63'

Kilat Club Ground
Attendance: 12,000

=== Pool B ===
Pos	Team	Pld	W	D	L	GF	GA	GD	Pts	Qualification
1	India	5	3	1	1	14	5	+9	7 (Note: India wins head-to-head against West Germany)	Semifinal
2	West Germany	5	3	1	1	13	9	+4	7	Semifinal
3	Australia	5	2	2	1	16	6	+10	6	
4	England	5	2	1	2	13	10	+3	5	
5	Argentina	5	2	1	2	9	12	−3	5	
6	Ghana	5	0	0	5	4	27	−23	0	

Source: FIH
Rules for classification: 1) points; 2) head-to-head result; 3) goal difference; 4) goals scored.
Notes:

The match played between India and West Germany on 7 March 1975 was abandoned due to bad light and was rescheduled for 10 March. The match was played at the Jalan Raja Muda Stadium and was stopped 25 minutes from time after West Germany goalkeeper complained of poor light, and the officials decided to call off the match.

=== Fixtures ===
2 March 1975

Australia	9–0	Ghana
Smith 16'; Walter 18', 34', 38'; Walsh 26'; Marshall 52'; Cooke 57'; Browning 67'	Report

2 March 1975

India	2–1	England
Philips 16', 28'	Report	Herbert 22'

Stadium Merdeka
Umpires:
P. S. Lathouwers (NED)
G. Vijayanathan (MAS)

3 March 1975

West Germany	4–2	Argentina
Strodter 17'; Peter 40'; Kässmann 43'; Trump 57'	Report	J. Sabbione 12'; A. Sabbione 65'

5 March 1975

Australia	1–3	England
Cooke 33'	Report	Whitaker 22', 24'; Svehlik 65'

5 March 1975

West Germany	3–2	Ghana
Vos 18', 51'; W. Krause 68'	Report	Sam 35', 58'

Attendance: 8,000
Umpires:
K. Jamaspian (IRA)

7 March 1975

India	1–1	Australia
Govinda 4'	Report	Irvine 12'

Jalan Raja Muda Stadium
Umpires:
G. Vijayanathan (MAS)

7 March 1975

Argentina	2–1	Ghana
Paolucci 27', 46'	Report	Sam 52'

Kilat Club Ground

8 March 1975

Argentina	3–3	England
Paolucci 19'; Quaquarini 32'; Sibbione 38'	Report	Neale 36', 64'; Long 52'

8 March 1975

India	7–0	Ghana
Surjit 3'; Govinda 9'; Khan 11'; Mohinder 44', 56', 59'; Kumar 47'	Report

8 March 1975

Australia	2–2	West Germany
Haigh 66'; Poole 68'	Report	Lissek 37'; Peter 65'

9 March 1975

West Germany	3–0	England
Strodter 22'; Vos 59'; Seifert 68'	Report

Seremban Municipal Stadium

9 March 1975

Argentina	2–1	India
de Giocami 25'; Barreiros 28'	Report	Harc. Singh 22'

Seremban Municipal Stadium
Attendance: 12,000

10 March 1975
14:00

Australia	3–0	Argentina
Walter 34'; Hammond 40'; Browning 66'	Report

10 March 1975
14:00

India	3–1	West Germany
Philips 19'; M. Singh 37'; Pawar 57'	Report	Schmidt 23'

Stadium Merdeka
Attendance: 10,000

11 March 1975
14:00

England	6–1	Ghana
Long 5', 53'; Disbury 11', 27', 51'; Svehlik 67'	Report	Sam 52'

== Classification round ==
=== Ninth to twelfth place classification ===
9th–12th place semifinals
12 March
Netherlands	5
Argentina	0
12 March
Poland (a.e.t.)	3
Ghana	2

Ninth place game
14 March
Netherlands	3
Poland	1
Eleventh place game
14 March
Argentina	6
Ghana	0

==== Ninth to twelfth qualifiers ====
12 March 1975

Netherlands	5–0	Argentina
Mundt 10'; T. Kruize 16'; Steens 27', 60'; Boerma 32'	Report

12 March 1975

Poland	3–2 (a.e.t.)	Ghana
Grotowski 34', 56'; Otulakowski 104'	Report	Sam 43'; Aboagye 57'

==== Eleventh and twelfth place ====
14 March 1975

Argentina	6–0	Ghana
Marinoni ?'; Paolucci ?', ?', ?'; Disera ?' de Giacomi ?'	Report

==== Ninth and tenth place ====
14 March 1975

Netherlands	3–1	Poland
H. Kruize 23', 69'; T. Kruize 53'	Report	Stefanski

=== Fifth to eighth place classification ===
5th–8th place semifinals
12 March
England (a.e.t.)	5
Spain	4
12 March
Australia	5
New Zealand	0

Fifth place game
14 March
Australia	3
England	1
Seventh place game
14 March
New Zealand	2
Spain	1

==== Fifth to eighth qualifiers ====
12 March 1975

Australia	5–0	New Zealand
Marshall 6'; Charlesworth 20', 60'; Irvine 29', 44'	Report

12 March 1975

England	5–4 (a.e.t.)	Spain
Svehlik 5', 28', 86'; McGinn 17'; Long 68'	Report	Gegura 12'; Fabregas 31'; Salles 35'; Borrell 58'

==== Seventh and eighth place ====
14 March 1975

New Zealand	2–1	Spain
Patel 27'; Parkin 46'	Report	Fabregas 28'

==== Fifth and sixth place ====
14 March 1975

Australia	3–1	England
Irvine 17', 43'; Haigh 69'	Report	Neale 65'

== Medal round ==
Semi-finals
13 March
Pakistan	5
West Germany	1
13 March
India (a.e.t.)	3
Malaysia	2

Final
15 March
India	2
Pakistan	1
Third place
15 March
West Germany	4
Malaysia	0

=== Semi-finals ===
The semi-final match between India and Malaysia was played on 13 March and was called off due to rain nine minutes into the game. It was rescheduled for the following day.

13 March 1975

Pakistan	5–1	West Germany
Khan 6'; Hassan 38', 41', 55'; Mansoor Jr. 54'	Report	Drose 58'

Attendance: 15,000

14 March 1975

India	3–2 (a.e.t.)	Malaysia
Pawar 40'; Khan 66'; Harcharan 79'	Report	Loke 33'; Shanmuganathan 42'

Stadium Merdeka
Attendance: 50,000
Umpires:
H. Servetto (ARG)
P. S. Lathouwers (NED)

=== Third and fourth place ===
15 March 1975

West Germany	4–0	Malaysia
Lauruschkat 4'; Strodter 15'; Trump 45', 60'	Report

Stadium Merdeka

=== Final ===
In the final match, Indian team faced its traditional archrival Pakistani team. Match was scheduled on 15 March 1975. Ashok Kumar scored the all-important winning goal to achieve India's lone triumph in the World cup.

15 March 1975
15:00

India	2–1	Pakistan
S. Singh 44'; Kumar 51'	Report	Zahid 17'

Attendance: 35,000—50,000
Umpires:
G. Vijayanathan (MAS)
A. Renaud (FRA)

== Final standings ==
Pos	Team	Pld	W	D	L	GF	GA	GD	Pts	Final result
1st place, gold medalist(s)	India	7	5	1	1	19	8	+11	11	Gold medal
2nd place, silver medalist(s)	Pakistan	7	4	2	1	20	9	+11	10	Silver medal
3rd place, bronze medalist(s)	West Germany	7	4	1	2	18	14	+4	9	Bronze medal
4	Malaysia (H)	7	2	2	3	8	11	−3	6	
5	Australia	7	4	2	1	24	7	+17	10	
6	England	7	3	1	3	19	17	+2	7	
7	New Zealand	7	3	1	3	7	12	−5	7	
8	Spain	7	2	1	4	10	16	−6	5	
9	Netherlands	7	3	1	3	17	10	+7	7	
10	Poland	7	2	1	4	12	18	−6	5	
11	Argentina	7	3	1	3	15	17	−2	7	
12	Ghana	7	0	0	7	6	36	−30	0	

Source: FIH
(H) Hosts

== Awards ==
1975 Men's FIH Hockey World Cup

India
First title

Team squad: Leslie Fernandez, Ashok Diwan, Surjit Singh, Michael Kindo, Aslam Sher Khan, Varinder Singh, Onkar Singh, Ajit Pal Singh (Captain), Mohinder Singh, Ashok Kumar (field hockey), B. P. Govinda, Harcharan Singh, Harjinder Singh, Victor Philips, Shivaji Pawar, P. E. Kalaiah.
Head Coach: Gurcharan Singh (G.S.) Bodhi

== See also ==
- 1974 Women's Hockey World Cup
