= Belgium at the 1976 Summer Olympics =

- IOC code: BEL
- NOC: Belgian Olympic Committee

in Montreal
- Competitors: 101 (75 men, 26 women) in 16 sports
- Flag bearer: Gaston Roelants
- Medals Ranked 28th: Gold 0 Silver 3 Bronze 3 Total 6

Summer Olympics appearances (overview)
- 1900; 1904; 1908; 1912; 1920; 1924; 1928; 1932; 1936; 1948; 1952; 1956; 1960; 1964; 1968; 1972; 1976; 1980; 1984; 1988; 1992; 1996; 2000; 2004; 2008; 2012; 2016; 2020; 2024; 2028

Other related appearances
- 1906 Intercalated Games

Belgium competed at the 1976 Summer Olympics in Montreal, Quebec, Canada. 101 competitors, 75 men and 26 women, took part in 80 events in 16 sports.

== Medalists ==
Belgium finished in 28th position in the final medal rankings, with three silver medals and three bronze medals.

Medal	Name	Sport	Event
Silver	Ivo Van Damme	Athletics	men's 800 metres
Silver	Ivo Van Damme	Athletics	men's 1500 metres
Silver	Michel Vaarten	Cycling	men's 1000 metre time trial
Bronze	Karel Lismont	Athletics	men's marathon
Bronze	François Mathy	Equestrian	individual jumping Grand Prix
Bronze	Eric Wauters; François Mathy; Edgar-Henri Cuepper; Stanny Van Paesschen	Equestrian	team jumping Grand Prix

== Archery ==
In Belgium's second appearance in the modern archery competition, the nation was represented by two men, including Olympic veteran Robert Cogniaux.

Men's Individual Competition:

- Pierre Blacks — 2353 points (→ 18th place)
- Robert Cogniaux — 2346 points (→ 23rd place)

== Athletics ==
Men's 800 metres

- Ivo Van Damme
  - Heat — 1:47.80
  - Semi Final — 1:46.00
  - Final — 1:43.86 (→ Silver Medal)

Men's 5.000 metres

- Willy Polleunis
  - Heat — 13:45.24
  - Final — 13:26.99 (→ 6th place)
- Marc Smet
  - Heat — 13:23.76 (→ did not advance)

Men's 10.000 metres

- Marc Smet
  - Heat — 28:22.07
  - Final — 28:02.80 (→ 7th place)
- Karel Lismont
  - Heat — 28:17.45
  - Final — 28:26.48 (→ 11th place)
- Emiel Puttemans
  - Heat — 28:15.52
  - Final — did not finish (→ no ranking)

Men's Marathon

- Karel Lismont — 2:11:12 (→ Bronze Medal)
- Henri Schoofs — 2:15:52 (→ 10th place)
- Gaston Roelants — did not start (→ no ranking)

Men's High Jump

- Guy Moreau
  - Qualification — 2.13m (→ did not advance)
- Bruno Brokken
  - Qualification — DNS (→ did not advance)

Men's Long Jump

- Ronald Desruelles
  - Qualification — 7.60m (→ did not advance)

Men's Discus Throw

- Georges Schroeder
  - Qualification — 54.80m (→ did not advance)

Men's 20 km Race Walk

- Godfried Dejonckheere — 1:35:03 (→ 25th place)

== Boxing ==
One man represented Belgium in boxing in 1976.

Athlete	Event	Round of 32	Round of 16	Quarterfinals	Semifinals	Final / Bronze match	
Athlete	Event	Opposition Result	Opposition Result	Opposition Result	Opposition Result	Opposition Result	Rank
Rudy Gauwe	Men's heavyweight	Bye	Eric George (ISV); W walk-over	Clarence Hill (BER); L 5-0	Did not advance		5

== Cycling ==
Seven cyclists represented Belgium in 1976.

Individual road race

- Alfons De Wolf — 4:47:23 (→ 4th place)
- Frank Hoste — 4:49:01 (→ 36th place)
- Dirk Heirweg — 4:55:41 (→ 47th place)
- Eddy Schepers — 4:55:41 (→ 48th place)

Team time trial

- Alfons De Wolf
- Dirk Heirweg
- Daniel Willems
- Frank Hoste

Sprint

- Michel Vaarten — 10th place

1000m time trial

- Michel Vaarten — 1:07.516 (→ Silver Medal)

Individual pursuit

- Jean-Louis Baugnies — 11th place

== Fencing ==
Four fencers, one man and three women, represented Belgium in 1976.

Men's foil

- Thierry Soumagne

Men's épée

- Thierry Soumagne

Women's foil

- Marie-Paule Van Eyck
- Micheline Borghs
- Claudine le Comte

== Hockey ==
Men's Team Competition

- Preliminary Round (Group B)
  - Lost to Pakistan (0-5)
  - Lost to New Zealand (1-2)
  - Defeated Spain (3-2)
  - Lost to West Germany (1-6)
- Classification Matches
  - 9th/12th place: Defeated Argentina (3-2)
  - 9th/10th place: Defeated Canada (3-2) → Ninth place
- Team Roster
  - ( 1.) Frank Smissaert
  - ( 2.) Guy Miserque
  - ( 3.) Francis Bouche
  - ( 4.) Serge Dubois
  - ( 5.) Bernard Smeekens
  - ( 6.) Bernard Mauchien
  - ( 7.) Paul Urbain
  - ( 8.) Armand Solie
  - ( 9.) Michel Vanderborght
  - (10.) Carl-Eric Vanderborght
  - (11.) Robert Maroye
  - (12.) Bruno De Clynsen
  - (13.) Jean-François Gilles
  - (14.) Jean Toussaint
  - (15.) Michel Van Tyckom
  - (16.) Jean-Claude Moraux
- Head coach: Ernst Willig

== Swimming ==
- Geert Boekhout
- Véronique Brisy
- Colette Crabbe
- François Deley
- Chantal Grimard
- Pierrette Michel
- Anne Richard
- Ilse Schoors
- Johan Van Steenberge
- Carine Verbauwen
