= 1983 Men's Hockey Champions Trophy =

Tournament details
- Host country: Pakistan
- City: Karachi
- Dates: 28 October - 4 November
- Teams: 6

Final positions
- Champions: Australia (1st title)
- Runner-up: Pakistan
- Third place: West Germany

The 1983 Men's Hockey Champions Trophy was the fifth edition of the Hockey Champions Trophy men's field hockey tournament. It took place from 28 October - 4 November in Karachi, Pakistan.

== Tournament ==
=== Final table ===
Team	Pld	W	D	L	GF	GA	GD	Pts
Australia	5	3	2	0	14	7	+7	8
Pakistan	5	3	0	2	10	6	+4	6
West Germany	5	3	0	2	9	9	0	6
India	5	2	1	2	8	9	−1	5
Netherlands	5	2	0	3	11	13	−2	4
New Zealand	5	0	1	4	5	13	−8	1

Source: FIH

=== Results ===
Team One	Team Two	Score
Netherlands	Australia	2–5
India	West Germany	1–2
Pakistan	New Zealand	3–0
Pakistan	India	2–0
Netherlands	West Germany	1–2
New Zealand	Australia	1–1
West Germany	New Zealand	3–1
Pakistan	Australia	0–2
India	Netherlands	2–1
Netherlands	New Zealand	4–2
Australia	India	3–3
Pakistan	West Germany	1–3
India	New Zealand	2–1
Pakistan	Netherlands	2–3
Australia	West Germany	3–1

=== Winning Squad ===
Australia

- Ric Charlesworth
- Jim Irvine
- Colin Batch
- David Bell
- Craig Davies
- Grant Mitton
- Peter Haselhurst
- Trevor King
- Terry Leece
- Michael Nobbs
- Nigel Patmore
- Neil Snowden
- Terry Walsh
- Grant Boyce
- Stephen Colledge
- Trevor Smith
