= Malaysia at the 1976 Summer Olympics =

- IOC code: MAS (MAL used at these Games)
- NOC: Olympic Council of Malaysia

in Montreal
- Competitors: 23 in 5 sports
- Flag bearer: Ishtiaq Mubarak
- Medals: Gold 0 Silver 0 Bronze 0 Total 0

Summer Olympics appearances (overview)
- 1956; 1960; 1964; 1968; 1972; 1976; 1980; 1984; 1988; 1992; 1996; 2000; 2004; 2008; 2012; 2016; 2020; 2024

Other related appearances
- North Borneo (1956)

Malaysia competed at the 1976 Summer Olympics in Montreal, Quebec, Canada. 23 competitors, all men, took part in 9 events in 5 sports.

== Athletics ==
Key

- Note–Ranks given for track events are within the athlete's heat only
- Q = Qualified for the next round
- q = Qualified for the next round as a fastest loser or, in field events, by position without achieving the qualifying target
- NR = National record
- N/A = Round not applicable for the event
- Bye = Athlete not required to compete in round

Men
Track & road events

Athlete	Event	Heat		Quarterfinal		Semifinal		Final	
Athlete	Event	Result	Rank	Result	Rank	Result	Rank	Result	Rank
Ramli Ahmad	100 m	10.98	6	Did not advance					
Ramli Ahmad	200 m	21.92	5	Did not advance					
Ishtiaq Mubarak	110 m hurdles	14.27	5 Q	—N/a		14.21	8	Did not advance	
Khoo Chong Beng	20 km walk	—N/a						1:40:16.8	32

== Cycling ==
One cyclist represented Malaysia in 1976.

=== Road ===
Athlete	Event	Time	Rank
Yahya Ahmad	Men's individual road race	DNF	

== Hockey ==
=== Men's tournament ===
Team roster

- Khairuddin Zainal
- Azaari Mohamed Zain
- Sri Shanmuganathan
- Francis Belavantheran
- Lam Kok Meng
- Mohinder Singh Amar
- Wong Choon Hin
- Singaram Balasingam
- Nallasamy Padanisamy
- Rengasamy Ramakrishnan
- Murugesan Mahendran
- Avtar Singh Gill
- Anthony Cruz
- Poon Fook Loke
- Ramalingam Pathmarajah
- Ow Soon Kooi

Group A

Team	Pld	W	D	L	GF	GA	Pts
Netherlands	5	5	0	0	11	3	10
Australia	5	3	0	2	14	6	6
India	5	3	0	2	12	9	6
Malaysia	5	2	0	3	3	7	4
Canada	5	1	0	4	4	11	2
Argentina	5	1	0	4	4	12	2

Qualified for the semifinals

18 July 1976

Australia	2–0 (1–0)	Malaysia

20 July 1976

Netherlands	2–0 (0–0)	Malaysia

21 July 1976

Malaysia	2–0 (0–0)	Argentina

23 July 1976

Malaysia	1–0 (0–0)	Canada

24 July 1976

India	3–0 (2–0)	Malaysia

Fifth to eighth classification

29 July 1976

Spain	2–1 (1–0)	Malaysia

Seventh and eighth place match

30 July 1976

India	2–0 (0–0)	Malaysia

Ranked 8th in final standings

== Shooting ==
Mixed

Athlete	Event	Qualification		Final	
Athlete	Event	Points	Rank	Points	Rank
Ally Ong	Skeet	—N/a		181	50
Edmund Yong	Skeet	—N/a		169	64

== Swimming ==
Men

Athlete	Event	Heat		Semifinal		Final	
Athlete	Event	Time	Rank	Time	Rank	Time	Rank
Chiang Jin Choon	100 m backstroke	1:05.86	6	did not advance			
Chiang Jin Choon	200 m backstroke	2:21.04	7	—N/a		did not advance	
