= Pakistan at the 1976 Summer Olympics =

- IOC code: PAK
- NOC: National Olympic Committee of Pakistan
- Website: www.nocpakistan.org

in Montreal
- Competitors: 24 in 5 sports
- Flag bearer: Abdul Rasheed Jr
- Medals Ranked 37th: Gold 0 Silver 0 Bronze 1 Total 1

Summer Olympics appearances (overview)
- 1948; 1952; 1956; 1960; 1964; 1968; 1972; 1976; 1980; 1984; 1988; 1992; 1996; 2000; 2004; 2008; 2012; 2016; 2020; 2024

Pakistan competed at the 1976 Summer Olympics in Montreal, Canada. The men's hockey team won a bronze medal.

== Medalists ==
Bronze medal won by the hockey team in the men's team competition.

Medals by sport
Sport	Gold	Silver	Bronze	Total
Field Hockey	0	0	1	1
Total	0	0	1	1

== Results by event ==
=== Athletics ===
Men's 800 metres

- Mohammad Younus

- Heat 1 round 1; 1:48.50 (→ did not advance)

Men's 1500 metres

- Muhammad Siddique

- Heat 4 round 1; 3:45.59 (→ did not advance)

=== Boxing ===
Men's flyweight (51 kg)

- Mohammad Sadiq

- 1/32 final; Bye
- 1/16 final; Lost to Giovanni Camputaro (ITA) on pts 5:0

Men's middleweight (75 kg)

- Siraj Din

- 1/16 final; Beat Nicolas Arredondo (MEX) RSC 3rd rd
- 1/8 final; w/o (1/16 final between Pierre Lotti Mwale (ZIM) and Zakaria Amalemba (KEN) not contested)
- 1/4 final; Lost to Rufat Riskiev (USSR) KO 2nd rd

=== Hockey ===
==== Men's team competition ====
Pool B

Pos	Team	Pld	W	D	L	GF	GA	GD	Pts	Qualification
1	Pakistan	4	3	1	0	16	6	+10	7	Semi-finals
2	New Zealand	4	1	2	1	6	8	−2	4 (Note: New Zealand and Spain finished on equal points at the conclusion of the pool stage, resulting in a match to determine second place in the pool. The match was contested on 26 July 1976 and New Zealand won 1–0.)	Semi-finals
3	Spain	4	1	2	1	9	7	+2	4	
4	West Germany	4	1	1	2	10	10	0	3	
5	Belgium	4	1	0	3	5	15	−10	2	
6	Kenya	0	0	0	0	0	0	0	0	Withdrew

Source: Olympedia
Notes:

- Defeated Belgium (5-0)
- Drew with Spain (2-2)
- Defeated West Germany (4-2)
- Defeated New Zealand (5-2)

Semifinals

- Lost to Australia (2-1)

For the 3rd place

- Defeated Netherlands (3-2)

Pakistan won the bronze medal

Team Roster

- Abdul Rasheed Jr (captain)
- Islahuddin (vice-captain)
- Saleem Sherwani (gk)
- Qamar Zia (gk)
- Munawwaruz Zaman
- Manzoorul Hasan
- Arshad Mahmood
- Akhtar Rasool
- Iftikhar Syed
- Arshad Chaudhry
- Saleem Nazim
- Hanif Khan
- Shahnaz Sheikh
- Samiullah Khan
- Manzoor Hussain
- Mudassar Asghar

=== Weightlifting ===
Men's bantamweight (56 kg)

- Mohammad Manzoor

- Snatch 95.0kg
- Clean and jerk 130.0kg
- Total 225.0kg (finished 11th out of 17)

Men's middleweight (75 kg)

- Mohammad Arshad Malik

- Snatch 122.5kg
- Clean and jerk 160.0kg
- Total 282.5kg (finished 15th out of 15)

=== Wrestling Freestyle ===
Men's up to 57 kg

- Allah Ditta

- Round 1; Lost to Joe Corso (USA) on pts 20:8
- Round 2; Lost to Masao Arai (JPN) by fall

Men's up to 90 kg

- Salahuddin

- Round 1; Beat Dashdorj Tserentogtokh (MGL) by fall
- Round 2; Lost to Pawel Kurczewski (POL) by fall
- Round 3; Lost to Keijo Manni (FIN) by fall
