= Vanderborght =

Vanderborght is a surname. Notable people with the surname include:

- Carl-Eric Vanderborght (born 1951), Belgian field hockey player
- Michel Vanderborght (born 1949), Belgian field hockey player
