= Juan Colomer =

Juan Colomer may refer to:

- Juan J. Colomer (born 1966), Spanish composer
- Juan Colomer (field hockey) (born 1952), Spanish field hockey player
