= Antonio Cruz =

Antonio, Anthony or Tony Cruz may refer to:

- Antonio Cruz (cyclist) (born 1971), American road bicycle racer
- Antonio Cruz Torres (born 1957), Dominican businessman and politician
- Antonio Cruz (swimmer) (born 1952), Guatemalan swimmer
- Antonio Cruz Villalón (born 1948), Spanish architect
- AZ (rapper) (Anthony Cruz, born 1972), American rapper
- Anthony Cruz (field hockey) (born 1956), Malaysian Olympic hockey player
- Tony Cruz (jockey) (born 1956), Hong Kong Thoroughbred jockey and horse trainer
- Tony Cruz (baseball) (born 1986), Major League Baseball player for the Kansas City Royals
- Toni Cruz (1946 – 2025), Spanish TV producer and singer

== See also ==
- Antonio de la Cruz (born 1947), Spanish football player and manager
- Antonio de la Cruz (1480–1550), Roman Catholic bishop of Islas Canarias
- Tony dela Cruz (born 1978), Filipino-American basketball player
- Estádio Antônio Cruz, Brazilian football venue
