= David Bissett =

David Bissett may refer to:

- David Bissett (bobsleigh) (born 1979), Canadian bobsledder
- David Bissett (field hockey) (born 1954), Canadian field hockey player
