= Reg Plummer =

Reg Plummer may refer to:

- Reg Plummer (field hockey)
- Reg Plummer (rugby union)
