= Hockey at the 1976 Olympics =

Hockey at the 1976 Olympics may refer to:

- Ice hockey at the 1976 Winter Olympics
- Field hockey at the 1976 Summer Olympics
