= Francisco Codina =

Spanish field hockey player (born 1949)

Personal information
- Nationality: Spanish
- Born: 7 August 1949 (age 76)

Sport
- Sport: Field hockey

Francisco Codina (born 7 August 1949) is a Spanish field hockey player. He competed in the men's tournament at the 1976 Summer Olympics.
