= Peter Lown =

Canadian field hockey player

Peter Lown (born May 29, 1947 in Bolton, Lancashire, England) is a former field hockey player.

Lown competed for Canada at the 1976 Summer Olympics in Montreal, Quebec, Canada. He finished in tenth place with the Men's National Team.

== International senior competitions ==
- 1976 – Olympic Games, Montreal (10th)
- Peter has also been instrumental in the ULCC (Uniform Law Conference of Canada) for several years.
