= Rob Toft =

Dutch hockey player

Personal information
- Nationality: Dutch
- Born: 23 November 1949 (age 76) Jakarta, Indonesia

Sport
- Sport: Field hockey

Robert Peter "Rob" Toft (born 23 November 1949) is a Dutch field hockey player. He competed in the men's tournament at the 1976 Summer Olympics.
