= Wouter Kan =

Dutch hockey player

Personal information
- Nationality: Dutch
- Born: 7 August 1950 (age 75) The Hague, Netherlands

Sport
- Sport: Field hockey

Wouter Kan (born 7 August 1950) is a Dutch former field hockey player. He competed in the men's tournament at the 1976 Summer Olympics.
