= Peter Caninenberg =

German hockey player

Personal information
- Nationality: German
- Born: 28 September 1956 (age 69) Munich, West Germany

Sport
- Sport: Field hockey

Peter Caninenberg (born 28 September 1956) is a German field hockey player. He competed in the men's tournament at the 1976 Summer Olympics.
