= Osvaldo Zanni =

Argentine hockey player

Personal information
- Nationality: Argentine
- Born: 5 March 1955 (age 71)

Sport
- Sport: Field hockey

Osvaldo Zanni (born 5 March 1955) is an Argentine field hockey player. He competed in the men's tournament at the 1976 Summer Olympics.
