= Chris Ineson =

New Zealand field hockey player

Personal information
- Full name: Christopher Robert Ineson
- Born: January 4, 1945 (age 81) Cheltenham, United Kingdom

Sport
- Sport: Field hockey
- Team: New Zealand

Achievements and titles
- Olympic finals: 1972 Munich

Christopher Robert Ineson (born 4 January 1945 in Cheltenham, United Kingdom) is a former field hockey player from New Zealand, who competed with the national team at the 1972 Summer Olympics in Munich.

His younger brother Tony represented The Kiwi's four years later, when the team surprisingly won the gold medal at the 1976 Summer Olympics in Montreal.
