= Klaus Ludwiczak =

German hockey player

Personal information
- Nationality: German
- Born: 21 October 1951 (age 74) Cologne, West Germany

Sport
- Sport: Field hockey

Klaus Ludwiczak (born 21 October 1951) is a German field hockey player. He competed in the men's tournament at the 1976 Summer Olympics.
