= Luis Antonio Costa =

Argentine field hockey player

Personal information
- Nationality: Argentine
- Born: 31 January 1953 (age 73)

Sport
- Sport: Field hockey

Luis Antonio Costa (born 31 January 1953) is an Argentine field hockey player. He competed in the men's tournament at the 1976 Summer Olympics.
