= Francisco Fabregas =

Francisco Fabregas may refer to:

- Francisco Fábregas Bosch (born 1949), field hockey player
- Francisco Fábregas Monegal (born 1977), field hockey player
- Cesc Fàbregas (born 1987), Spanish footballer
