= Brian Disbury (field hockey) =

British field hockey player

Personal information
- Born: Q.1951 Aylesbury, England

Sport
- Sport: Field hockey
- Position: Forward
Senior career
| Years | Team | Caps | Goals |
| 1969–1982 | Redditch | - | - |
National team
| Years | Team | Caps | Goals |
| – | Great Britain & England | 12 | - |

Brian R. Disbury (born Q1.1951) is a former British hockey international.

== Biography ==
Disbury, born in Aylebury, played club hockey for Redditch Hockey Club in the Men's England Hockey League and represented the Midlands and Worcestershire at county level.

While at Redditch, he was called into the England training camp in 1973 and made his debut for England in 1974 and Great Britain in 1975.

He represented England at the 1975 Men's Hockey World Cup in Kuala Lumpur.

After retiring from competitive hockey he joined the Great Britain set up and was the assistant manager to the bronze medal-winning side at the 1984 Summer Olympics.
