= Geert van Eijk =

Dutch field hockey player

Personal information
- Nationality: Dutch
- Born: 8 October 1948 (age 77) Tegelen, Netherlands

Sport
- Sport: Field hockey

Geert van Eijk (born 8 October 1948) is a Dutch field hockey player. He competed in the men's tournament at the 1976 Summer Olympics.
