= César Raguso =

Argentine field hockey player

Personal information
- Nationality: Argentine
- Born: 20 June 1960 (age 65)

Sport
- Sport: Field hockey

César Raguso (born 20 June 1960) is an Argentine field hockey player. He competed in the men's tournament at the 1976 Summer Olympics.
