= Trevor Manning =

New Zealand field hockey player (born 1945)

Medal record

Men's field hockey

Representing New Zealand

Olympic Games
Gold medal – first place	1976 Montreal	Team competition

Trevor Wayne Manning (born 19 December 1945 in Wellington) is a former field hockey goalkeeper from New Zealand, who was a member of the national team that won the golden medal at the 1976 Summer Olympics in Montreal, Quebec.
