= Robert Proctor (field hockey) =

Australian field hockey player

Olympic medal record

Men's Field hockey
Silver medal – second place	1976 Montreal	Team competition

Robert Proctor (born 16 July 1949) is a retired field hockey player from Australia, who was a member of the Australia national field hockey team that won the silver medal at the 1976 Summer Olympics in Montreal, Canada.
