= Juan Colomer (field hockey) =

Spanish field hockey player (born 1952)

Personal information
- Nationality: Spanish
- Born: 3 July 1952 (age 73) Barcelona, Spain

Sport
- Sport: Field hockey

Juan Colomer (born 3 July 1952) is a Spanish field hockey player. He competed in the men's tournament at the 1976 Summer Olympics.
