= Munawwar uz Zaman =

Pakistani field hockey player

- Born: 2 July 1951; Lahore, Pakistan
- Died: 28 July 1994 (aged 43); Karachi, Pakistan
- Occupation: Field hockey player
- Awards: Pride of Performance Award by the President of Pakistan in 1997

Medal record

Men's field hockey

Representing Pakistan

Olympic Games
Silver medal – second place	1972 Munich	Team
Bronze medal – third place	1976 Montreal	Team

World Cup
Gold medal – first place	1971 Barcelona	Team
Silver medal – second place	1975 Kuala Lumpur	Team
Gold medal – first place	1978 Buenos Aires	Team

Asian Games
Gold medal – first place	1974 Tehran	Team
Gold medal – first place	1978 Bangkok	Team

Munawwaruz Zaman (2 April 1951 – 28 July 1994) was one of the players of the Pakistan national field hockey team produced by Pakistan. Munawwar played for Pakistan until his retirement in 1980. He was also a high-ranking bank officer. He died in 1994 of a cardiac arrest during a break while practicing with the Pakistan hockey team for veterans Hockey World Cup.

== Playing career ==
He began his career in 1971 when he was 19 years old. When Tanvir Dar was injured midway through the semifinals, Munawwar had his first ever shot at penalty corner in an international match. He became an instant hero and household name in Pakistan by scoring the match winning goal against Pakistan's traditional rival, India.

During his career Pakistan won the Olympic silver medal in 1972 and the bronze medal in 1976. He led Pakistan to a magnificent victory in the 2nd Champions Trophy in 1980 at Karachi and Kuala Lumpur Quadrangular Gold.

During his career, he scored a total of 44 goals in 119 matches. In the 1970s, Manzoor ul Hasan and Munawwar uz Zaman were considered the greatest pair of full backs in field hockey. In the early 1990s, Munawwar started working with the Pakistan team as a coach.

Played for Pakistan and Habib Bank Limited in Pakistan a total of 111 International Matches including the following:

- Olympics: 1972, 1976
- World Cups: 1971, 1975, 1978
- Asian Games: 1974, 1978
- Champion Trophies: 1978, 1980

In 1997, the Pakistan government awarded Munawwar uz Zaman a posthumous Pride of Performance award for his services to the country.
