= John Christensen (field hockey) =

New Zealand field hockey player

Olympic medal record

Representing New Zealand

Men's field hockey
Gold medal – first place	Montreal 1976	Team competition

John Hansen Christensen (born 29 April 1948) is a former field hockey player who was a member of the New Zealand national team that won the gold at the 1976 Summer Olympics in Montreal. He was born in Christchurch.
