= Bernard Smeekens =

Belgian field hockey player

Personal information
- Nationality: Belgian
- Born: 23 May 1951 (age 74) Uccle, Belgium

Sport
- Sport: Field hockey

Bernard Smeekens (born 23 May 1951) is a Belgian field hockey player. He competed in the men's tournament at the 1976 Summer Olympics.
