= Jeff Archibald =

Field hockey player

Jeff Archibald MBE
Personal information
- Full name: Jeffrey Victor Archibald
- Born: 2 February 1952 (age 74) Auckland, New Zealand
- Spouse: Deborah Jane Miller
- Relative: Ryan Archibald (son)

Sport
- Country: New Zealand
- Sport: Field hockey
Medal record
Representing New Zealand
Men's field hockey
| Gold medal – first place | Montreal 1976 | Team competition |

Jeffrey Victor Archibald MBE (born 2 February 1952) is a former field hockey player from New Zealand. He competed at three Summer Olympic Games, and was a member of the New Zealand men's team that won the hockey gold medal at the 1976 Montreal Olympics.

In the 1989 Queen's Birthday Honours, Archibald was appointed a Member of the Order of the British Empire, for services to hockey.
