= Graeme Reid =

Field hockey player

Personal information
- Born: 15 June 1948 (age 78)
- Height: 183 cm (6 ft 0 in)

Sport
- Sport: Field hockey
Medal record
Men's field hockey
Representing Australia
Olympic Games
Silver medal – second place	1976 Montreal	Team competition

Graham Reid (born 15 June 1948), also known as Graham Reid, is a retired field hockey player from Australia. He was a member of the national team that won the silver medal at the 1976 Summer Olympics in Montreal, Quebec, Canada. He also represented Australia at the 1972 Summer Olympics in Munich, Germany.
