= Nallasamy Padanisamy =

Malaysian field hockey player (born 1948)

Nallasamy Palanisamy
Personal information
- Nationality: Malaysian
- Born: 30 April 1948 (age 77)

Sport
- Sport: Field hockey

Nallasamy Padanisamy (born 30 April 1948) is a Malaysian field hockey player. He competed in the men's tournament at the 1976 Summer Olympics.
