= Arthur Borren =

Field hockey player

Olympic medal record

Representing New Zealand

Men's field hockey
| Gold medal – first place | 1976 Montreal | Team competition |

Arthur Borren (born 5 June 1949 in Eindhoven) is a Dutch-born former field hockey player from New Zealand who was a member of the New Zealand team that won the gold medal at the 1976 Summer Olympics in Montreal.

He was inducted into the New Zealand Sports Hall of Fame in 1990.
