= Alan Chesney =

New Zealand field hockey player

Medal record

Men's field hockey

Representing New Zealand

Olympic Games
| Gold medal – first place | 1976 Montreal | Team |

Alan Malcolm Chesney (born 28 April 1949) is a British-born New Zealand field hockey player. He lived in Christchurch and lives in Western Australia. He won a gold medal at the 1976 Summer Olympics in Montreal.
