= Frank Smissaert =

Belgian field hockey player

Personal information
- Nationality: Belgian
- Born: 9 June 1950 (age 75) Ostend, Belgium

Sport
- Sport: Field hockey

Frank Smissaert (born 9 June 1950) is a Belgian field hockey player. He competed in the men's tournament at the 1976 Summer Olympics.
