= Azaari Mohamed Zain =

Malaysian field hockey player (born 1952)

Personal information
- Nationality: Malaysian
- Born: 11 December 1952 (age 73)

Sport
- Sport: Field hockey

Azaari Mohamed Zain (born 11 December 1952) is a Malaysian field hockey player. He competed in the men's tournament at the 1976 Summer Olympics.
