= Syed Ali (field hockey, born 1956) =

Indian field hockey player

Personal information
- Nationality: Indian
- Born: 21 August 1956 (age 69)

Sport
- Sport: Field hockey
Medal record
Representing India
Men's field hockey
Asian Games
Silver medal – second place	1982 Delhi	Team

Syed Ali (born 21 August 1956) is an Indian field hockey player. He competed in the men's tournament at the 1976 Summer Olympics. He was from Uttarakhand.
