= Alan McIntyre =

New Zealand field hockey player

Personal information
- Born: Alan Lionel McIntyre; 20 September 1949 (age 77) Wanganui, New Zealand
Medal record
Men's field hockey
Representing New Zealand
Olympic Games
Gold medal – first place	1976 Montreal	Team competition

Alan Lionel McIntyre (born 20 September 1949 in Wanganui) is a former field hockey player from New Zealand, who was a member of the national team that won the golden medal at the 1976 Summer Olympics in Montreal.
