= Harjinder Singh =

Harjinder Singh may refer to:

- Harjinder Singh (air vice marshal), Indian air vice marshal
- Harjinder Singh Dilgeer, Indian philosopher
- Harjinder Singh (footballer), Indian footballer
- Harjinder Singh (food scientist), fellow of the Royal Society Te Apārangi
