= Mohan Patel =

Field hockey player

Olympic medal record

Representing New Zealand

Men's field hockey
Gold medal – first place	Montreal 1976	Team competition

Mohan Magan Patel (born 11 November 1952 in Auckland) is a former field hockey player from New Zealand, who was a member of the national team that won the gold medal at the 1976 Summer Olympics in Montreal, Quebec, Canada.

Mohan Patel was inducted into the New Zealand Sports Hall of Fame in 1990. He was a deputy principal at Mangere College, retiring in December 2016.
