= Lam Kok Meng =

Malaysian field hockey player (born 1949)

Personal information
- Nationality: Malaysian
- Born: 11 January 1949 (age 77)

Sport
- Sport: Field hockey

Lam Kok Meng (born 11 January 1949) is a Malaysian field hockey player. He competed in the men's tournament at the 1976 Summer Olympics.
