= Aslam Sher Khan =

Indian field hockey player

Member of Parliament, Lok Sabha
- In office 1984–1989
- Constituency: Betul

Personal details
- Born: 15 July 1953 (age 72) Bhopal, Bhopal State, India
- Party: Indian National Congress; Bharatiya Janata Party (1997 to 1999)
- Spouse: Married since 1981
- Children: 2

Medal record

Men's field hockey

Representing India

Hockey World Cup
Gold medal – first place	1975 Kuala Lumpur	

Asian Games
Silver medal – second place	1974 Tehran	

Aslam Sher Khan (born 15 July 1953) is an Indian hockey player and a former member of the Indian team. In the 1975 World Cup held at Kuala Lumpur, Aslam Sher Khan helped the Indian Hockey Team to win the gold medal. He was also a member of the Indian team who participated in the 1976 Summer Olympics.

Khan has also been a Congress Member of Parliament and a Union Minister as well. In December 1997, Aslam Sher Khan joined the Bharatiya Janata Party (BJP) but resigned from the party on 27 January 1999. He authored an autobiography, To Hell with Hockey.

== Early life ==
Aslam Sher Khan was born on 15 July 1953 to father Late Ahmed Sher Khan and mother Ahmedi in Bhopal, India. His father Ahmed Sher Khan was part of the gold-winning Indian hockey team in the 1936 Summer Olympics. As he said in his autobiography about his grandfather's saying, "Your father had a streak of madness in him, Like you, he had a great obsession for hockey. He made your mother promise that if they had a son, she would bring him up to be a hockey player." Ahmed Sher Khan was the Hockey coach of Aslam's school but never selected Aslam to play for the school team. When he asked his father about that, he would reply, "you still have a lot to learn."

== Career ==
Aslam Sher Khan In 1966, was called up for the All India schools hockey camp at Bhopal. But his father fell ill at that time. He did not want to join the camp but his father motivated him by saying "The more you play, and the better you play, the more I'll know you love me." That reverberated like an order to him and he went to join the camp.

He was selected in the All-India schools hockey team as a forward under the famous hockey player Roop Singh, who had played with his father in the 1936 Summer Olympics in Berlin. Hearing the news of the son's selection, his father started crying. Ahmed Sher died when his son was only 13. Aslam Sher Khan's ambition was to represent his country in hockey in the Olympics like his father. Aslam Sher Khan played hockey as a full back.

After the Indian Hockey Federation was suspended in April 2008, Khan was selected to head a new committee created by the Indian Olympic Association to organize hockey in India. This panel works in conjunction with the International Field Hockey Federation. The panel also includes Ashok Kumar, Ajit Pal Singh, Zafar Iqbal, and Dhanraj Pillay.

== Political career ==
He entered politics and was elected to the 8th Lok Sabha in 1984 as an Indian National Congress candidate from Betul constituency in Madhya Pradesh. He contested from Betul constituency again in 1989, but he lost. He was re-elected to the 10th Lok Sabha from the same constituency in 1991 but again lost in 1996.

In 1999, he contested from Bhopal Lok Sabha constituency as a Nationalist Congress Party candidate but lost again. In 2009, he contested from Sagar Lok Sabha constituency as a Congress candidate but could not win.

== Personal life ==
Aslam Sher Khan obtained a bachelor's degree in science from ia College, Bhopal. In October 1981, Aslam married and together with his wife, they have two sons, the younger is a New York Attorney.
