= Bernard Mauchien =

Belgian field hockey player

Personal information
- Nationality: Belgian
- Born: 26 October 1954 (age 71) Ixelles, Belgium

Sport
- Sport: Field hockey

Bernard Mauchien (born 26 October 1954) is a Belgian field hockey player. He competed in the men's tournament at the 1976 Summer Olympics.
