= David Bissett (field hockey) =

Canadian field hockey player

David Bissett (born May 13, 1954 in Vancouver, British Columbia) is a former field hockey player from Canada, who twice represented his native country at the Summer Olympics: in 1976 and in 1984. On both occasions he finished in tenth place with the Men's National Team. Bissett is a resident of New Westminster, British Columbia.

== International Senior Competitions ==
- 1976 – Olympic Games, Montreal (10th)
- 1984 – Olympic Games, Los Angeles (10th)
