= Douglas Golder =

Australian field hockey player

Personal information
- Full name: Douglas James Golder
- Nickname: Doug
- National team: Australia
- Born: 1 February 1948 (age 78)
Medal record
Men's field hockey
Representing Australia
Olympic Games
Silver medal – second place	1976 Montreal	Team competition

Douglas James Golder (born 1 February 1948) is a retired field hockey player from Australia, who was a member of the national team that won the silver medal at the 1976 Summer Olympics in Montreal, Quebec, Canada.
