= Héctor Marinoni =

Argentine field hockey player

Personal information
- Born: 20 August 1947 (age 78) Buenos Aires, Argentina

Sport
- Sport: Field hockey

Héctor Marinoni (born 20 August 1947) is an Argentine field hockey player. He competed at the 1968 Summer Olympics and the 1972 Summer Olympics.
