= Ilse Schoors =

Belgian swimmer

Personal information
- Born: 25 July 1961 (age 64) Sint-Antonius Brecht, Antwerp, Belgium

Sport
- Sport: Swimming

Ilse Schoors (born 25 July 1961) is a Belgian former breaststroke swimmer. She competed in two events at the 1976 Summer Olympics.
