= Paul Ackerley =

New Zealand hockey player

Personal information
- Full name: Paul Douglas Ackerley
- Born: 16 May 1949 Dunedin, New Zealand
- Died: 3 May 2011 (aged 61) Wellington, New Zealand
Medal record
Men's field hockey
Representing New Zealand
Olympic Games
Gold medal – first place	1976 Montreal	Team competition

Paul Douglas Ackerley (16 May 1949 – 3 May 2011) was a New Zealand field hockey player, Olympic gold medalist, mathematics teacher and public servant.

He played field hockey at right half. He was a member of the national team that won the gold medal at the 1976 Summer Olympics in Montreal. He was selected for the 1980 Summer Olympics, but most sports in New Zealand boycotted the Moscow games so he did not compete. He had 25 international caps for New Zealand.

Ackerley was born in Dunedin and grew up in Ashburton. He graduated from the University of Canterbury, where he played in the Canterbury University hockey club in the late 1960s. He was a secondary school mathematics teacher at Linwood College, Christchurch and then head of the maths department at Awatapu College, Palmerston North. He transferred to the Education Ministry inspectorate, and then the New Zealand Qualifications Authority, where he was in the group that developed the NCEA. He joined Sport and Recreation New Zealand (SPARC) in 2004 as a senior advisor in coaching and volunteers.

He coached the national woman's hockey team when it won a bronze at the 1998 Commonwealth Games in Malaysia, and the Wellington women's team.

Ackerley died in Wellington, New Zealand, aged 61 on 3 May 2011 from skin cancer after a short illness.
