= Paul Urbain =

Belgian hockey player

Personal information
- Nationality: Belgian
- Born: 24 January 1957 (age 69) Jemappes, Belgium

Sport
- Sport: Field hockey

Paul Urbain (born 24 January 1957) is a Belgian field hockey player. He competed in the men's tournament at the 1976 Summer Olympics.

== Personal life and work ==
Urbain is married to the sister of his hockey teammate Robert Maroye, together they have 3 children.

Urbain is a lawyer in Belgium and was head of the bar from 2019 to 2021.

== Sport career ==
=== International career ===
Urbain joined the Belgium men's national field hockey team in 1974 and played in 124 official games, some of them as team captain.

Urbain participated, amongst others:

- The Olympic Games (Montreal 1976)
- The world cup (Buenos Aires 1978)
- 2 intercontinental cups (Rome 1977 and Kuala Lumpur 1981)
- 2 European cups (Madrid 1974 and Amsterdam 1982)

=== Club career ===
Urbain played hockey in Belgium for R. Uccle Sport. With his team, he won 11 times the Belgian championship and 6 times the Belgian cup.

He also played 3 finals of the Euro Hockey League: in Amsterdam in 1976, in London in 1977 and in Terrassa in 1984.

In 1983, Urbain won the golden stick as hockey player of the year.

== Olympic movement ==
Urbain joined the Belgian Olympic Committee, involved in various roles from 1984 to 2013:

- member of the Athletes Commission (vice-president from 1984 to 1988 and president from 1988 to 1992)
- member of the Administration Board (elected in 1992 then reelected 4 times)
- member of different commissions such as the anti-doping commission, the Olympic athletes selection commission, the legal commission, the top sport commission
- twice deputy Chef de Mission at the Olympic Games (Sydney 2000 and Beijing 2008)
- 5 times Chef de Mission at the European Youth Olympic Festival (Lisbon 1997, Esbjerg 1999, Murcia 2001, Paris 2003 and Lignano 2005)
- founding member of the Belgian Olympians association

Urbain was carrying the Olympic flame during the Olympic torch relay ahead of the 2004 Athens Olympic Games, running with the flame in front of the Belgian Royal Palace.
