= Tony Ineson =

Field hockey player

Medal record

Men's field hockey

Representing New Zealand

Olympic Games
Gold medal – first place	1976 Montreal	Team competition

Anthony Braemar Ineson (born 23 April 1950 in Christchurch) is a former field hockey player from New Zealand, who was a member of the national team that won the gold medal at the 1976 Summer Olympics in Montreal.

Ineson was the captain of the 1976 gold medal-winning hockey team. His brother Chris was a New Zealand representative at the 1972 Summer Olympics.

Ineson was elected, with the rest of the gold medal-winning team, to the New Zealand Sports Hall of Fame in 1990.
