= Jean Toussaint (field hockey) =

Belgian hockey player

Personal information
- Nationality: Belgian
- Born: 13 August 1946 (age 79) Ixelles, Belgium

Sport
- Sport: Field hockey

Jean Toussaint (born 13 August 1946) is a Belgian field hockey player. He competed at the 1972 Summer Olympics and the 1976 Summer Olympics.
