= Shahnaz Sheikh =

Field hockey player

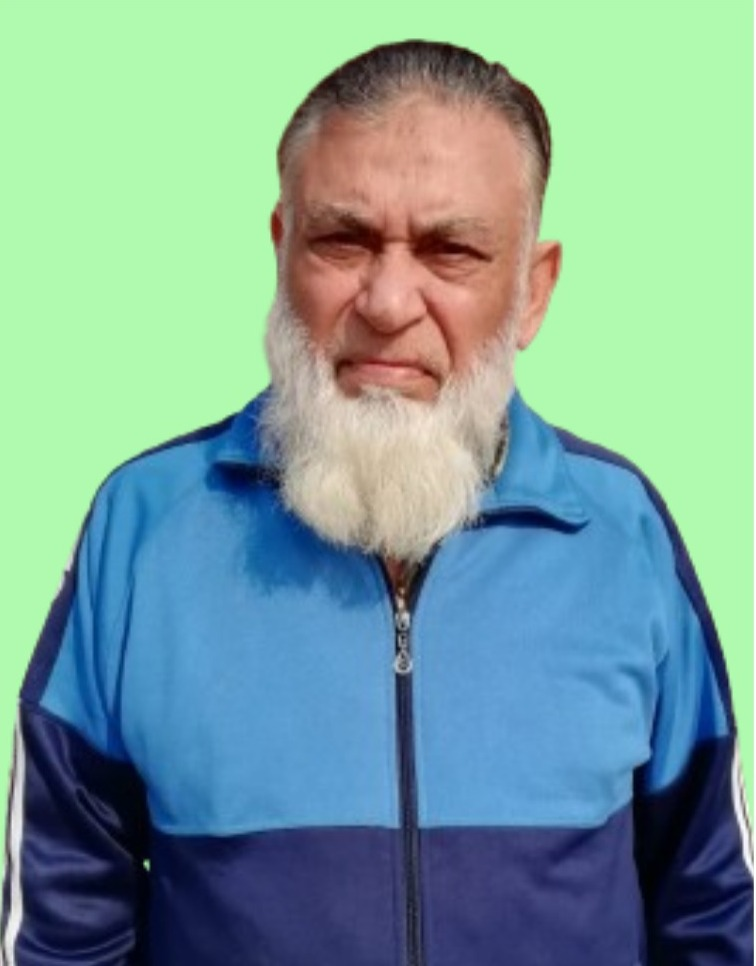
- Olympian Shahnaz Sheikh in 2024 by Muhammad Afsar Khan

Personal information
- Born: 21 March 1949 (age 77) Sialkot, Punjab, Pakistan
- Years active: 1969 - 2015
Medal record
Men's field hockey
Representing Pakistan
Olympic Games
Silver medal – second place	1972 Munich	Team
Bronze medal – third place	1976 Montreal	Team
Hockey World Cup
Gold medal – first place	1971 Barcelona	Team
Silver medal – second place	1975 Kuala Lumpur	Team
Gold medal – first place	1978 Buenos Aires	Team
Asian Games
Gold medal – first place	1970 Bangkok	Team
Gold medal – first place	1974 Tehran	Team
Gold medal – first place	1978 Bangkok	Team
Asia Cup
Champions Trophy
Gold medal – first place	1978 Lahore	Team

Shahnaz Sheikh (born 21 March 1949) is a retired Pakistani field hockey player. He was born at Sialkot, Pakistan. He is related to Olympians Zahid Sheikh and Tariq Sheikh. In 2014, he was the head coach of Pakistan National Hockey Team. He was appointed head coach of Pakistan hockey team for Olympics Qualifier to be held in Oman in January 2024.

A forward, Shahnaz Sheikh played between 1969 and 1978. He was capped 68 times and scored 45 goals for the Pakistan National Hockey Team. He was a member of Pakistan squads which won Silver in 1972 and Bronze in 1976 Olympics, respectively. Shahnaz was a member of the Pakistan hockey teams which won the 1971 Field Hockey World Cup, remained runners-up in 1975 and won again in 1978, respectively. Shahnaz was one of the most skilled hockey players that Pakistan had produced. At the same time, Shahnaz was also an explosive player who stood tall among his contemporaries and would have easily walked into any field hockey side in the world.

Shahnaz Sheikh was known for his skills on the left wing and played as an inner (inner forward) to Samiullah Khan during the later part of his career.

In the early 1970s, he was the most acrobatic Pakistani forward and by the mid-1970s, he had become such a force that his absence from the field through injury was a major cause of the 'Green Shirts' narrowly losing two high-profile matches: the 1975 Hockey World Cup final against India at Kuala Lumpur and the 1976 Montreal Olympics against Australia in the Semis. On both occasions, Pakistan went down 2–1 in controversial circumstances. Shahnaz also had a 'good hockey head' over his shoulders. One lasting impression of him was his rather brief stint as coach of the Pakistan Junior Team, in which Pakistan won the Junior Asia Cup.

In 2015, Shahnaz Sheikh served as national team coach but stepped down from his post after disappointing performance by Pakistan Hockey Team.

== Awards and recognition ==
- Shahnaz Sheikh is rated among the 'Top 10 Pakistan Hockey Players of All Time'.
- He received the Pride of Performance Award in 1990 from the President of Pakistan.

== See also ==
- Pakistan Hockey Federation
