= Robert Haigh (field hockey) =

Australian field hockey player

Olympic medal record

Men's Hockey
Silver medal – second place	1968 Mexico City	team
Silver medal – second place	1976 Montreal	team

Robert "Herbie" Haigh is a former hockey player from Australia. He was a three-time Olympian, who won two Olympic silver medals as a member of the national team at the 1968 Summer Olympics in Mexico City and the 1976 Summer Olympics in Montreal, Canada.

He also competed at the 1972 Summer Olympics in Munich, where the Australian team finished fifth.

Since retiring as a player, he has worked closely with the Australian men's and women's national programs as an assistant coach and senior selector. He also spent a number of years as the South Australian Sports Institute head coach in charge of the men's and women's elite programs, and the Australian Hockey League coach of the SA Hotshots. He was an assistant coach to Ric Charlesworth with the Australian women's team, the Hockeyroos, during the golden era of Australian women's hockey and in 2010 was a selector for the men's national team, the Kookaburras.

He was inducted into the Australian Hockey Hall of Fame in 2008 and South Australian Sport Hall of Fame in 2011.

== Playing hockey ==
=== Club hockey ===
Haigh played with the Woodville Hockey Club in South Australia, where he is a life member and vice patron. The reserve on which the Woodville clubrooms and pitch are located are named after him. He was the Best & Fairest player in the men's competition in 1965, 1968, 1969 and 1970.

=== National hockey ===
Haigh represented South Australia in the senior hockey team from 1964 to 1976.

=== International hockey ===
Haigh played 106 tests as a member of the Australian men's hockey team from 1966 to 1976, was vice captain from 1969 to 1974 and captain in 1975–1976.

He competed in three Olympics, won two silver Olympic medals with the team at the 1968 and 1976 Summer Olympic Games and was the official flag carrier for Australia at the closing ceremony of the 1976 Games in Montreal.

Haigh also competed at two World Cups: Barcelona in 1971 and Kuala Lumpur in 1975 (captain).

== Coaching hockey ==
=== Local and national ===
Haigh coached the SA Senior Men to a national championship in 1980. He was South Australian Sports Institute hockey coach from 2001 to 2006 and Hockey SA hockey development manager before that from 1991 to 1997, coaching numerous state junior teams in that time.

=== International ===
Haigh was an assistant coach for the Australia women's national field hockey team, the Hockeyroos under head coach Ric Charlesworth from 1997 to 2000 during which time they achieved the following results

- Gold medal at the 1998 women's Hockey World Cup
- Gold medal at the 1998 Commonwealth Games
- Gold medal at the 2000 Summer Olympics in Sydney.

He was also a selector for Australia men's national field hockey team, the Kookaburras, from 2009 to 2014. Haigh was the Fiji National Coach in 1981.

In 2008 he was inducted into the Australian Hockey Hall of Fame. In 2011, he was inducted into the South Australian Sport Hall of Fame.

== Awards and recognition ==
- 1965: The Advertiser Trophy for Best and Fairest in A1 Grade
- 1968-70: The Advertiser Trophy for Best and Fairest in A1 Grade
- Life Member and Vice Patron - Woodville Hockey Club
- Life Member - Hockey SA
- 2008: Inaugural Member of the Australian Hockey Hall of Fame
- 2011: Member of the South Australian Sport Hall of Fame
