= Ralf Lauruschkat =

German hockey player

Personal information
- Nationality: German
- Born: 27 January 1950 (age 76) Leverkusen, West Germany

Sport
- Sport: Field hockey

Ralf Lauruschkat (born 27 January 1950) is a German former field hockey player. He competed in the men's tournament at the 1976 Summer Olympics.
