= Wayne Hammond (field hockey) =

Australian field hockey player

Personal information
- Full name: Wayne Gary Hammond
- Born: 5 September 1948 (age 77) Brisbane, Queensland, Australia
- Height: 184 cm (6 ft 0 in)

Sport
- Sport: Field hockey
- Position: Fullback
Senior career
Years	Team	Caps	Goals
1971–1983	Queensland	-	-
National team
Years	Team	Caps	Goals
1972–1980	Australia	88	(0)
Medal record
Men's field hockey
Representing Australia
Olympic Games
Silver medal – second place	1976 Montreal	Team competition
World Cup
Bronze medal – third place	1978	Team competition
Champions Trophy
Bronze medal – third place	1980	Team competition

Wayne Gary Hammond (born 5 September 1948) is an Australian former field hockey player who played 88 matches for Australia and represented Australia at the 1972 and 1976 Olympic Games, winning a silver medal in 1976. He also played in the 1975 and 1978 World Cups, winning a bronze medal in 1978, and played in the 1980 Champions Trophy, winning a bronze medal.

== Early life ==
Hammond was born in Brisbane, Queensland. Hammond was conscripted into the Australian Army in 1969, as a result of the Vietnam War. He then moved to Singleton and later Puckapunyal to receive training. In 1970, he moved to the Canungra Army Base where he began to train more seriously in a pursuit of a hockey career. The Army supported Hammond with his hockey ambitions, allowing him to regularly travel to Brisbane for training.

== Career ==
In 1971, Hammond was selected to tour New Zealand with the Queensland hockey team. A year later, Hammond, who had left the Army and was working for a bank in Coolangatta, made his debut for the Australian national team, playing all three matches in a test series against New Zealand. That same year, Hammond, at the age of 23, played in the 1972 Olympic Games. Hammond played two matches as Australia went on to finish fifth. He continued to play for Australia after 1972, cementing his place in the side as a fullback. In 1975, he played for Australia at the World Cup in Kuala Lumpur, where Australia finished fifth.

The highest point of Hammond's career came when he played at the 1976 Olympic Games. He played all eight of the matches that Australia played in and the Australians reached the final, only to lose to New Zealand and receive a silver medal. He also played for Australia in the 1978 World Cup in Buenos Aires, where he and the Australian team won a bronze medal. In the lead up to the 1980 Olympics, Hammond played for Australia at the Champions Trophy tournament in Karachi, where the Australians won bronze. Hammond was selected to play for Australia at the Olympics in 1980, but due to the Games being held in Moscow, the Australian Hockey Federation decided to boycott the Olympics, despite the Australians being one of the favourites for the gold medal. The Australians instead toured Europe and Hammond retired from international hockey at the end of 1980. Hammond continued to play with Queensland for three more years, until he retired in 1983.

Hammond played for Australia at the Pacific Rim Masters Tournament in 1992 and 1993. He was captain of the team in 1993.

== Honours ==
Hammond was inducted into the Gold Coast Sporting Hall of Fame on 20 May 1999. In 2003, Hammond was inducted into the Hockey Queensland Hall of Fame. In 2008, Hammond was retrospectively awarded Hockey Queensland's Distinguished Player Award, which is awarded to people who have represented Queensland for seven years or more at Open level, and who have been retired for at least two years. Hockey Queensland announced their Team of the Century in 2000 and Hammond was named at fullback, alongside Don McWatters.

== Personal life ==
Hammond has two children. His daughter, Leanne, played for the Australia under-18 team from 1998 to 2000, and his son, Steven, played for Queensland's reserves team.
