= Mohinder Singh (field hockey) =

Indian field hockey player (1953–1977)

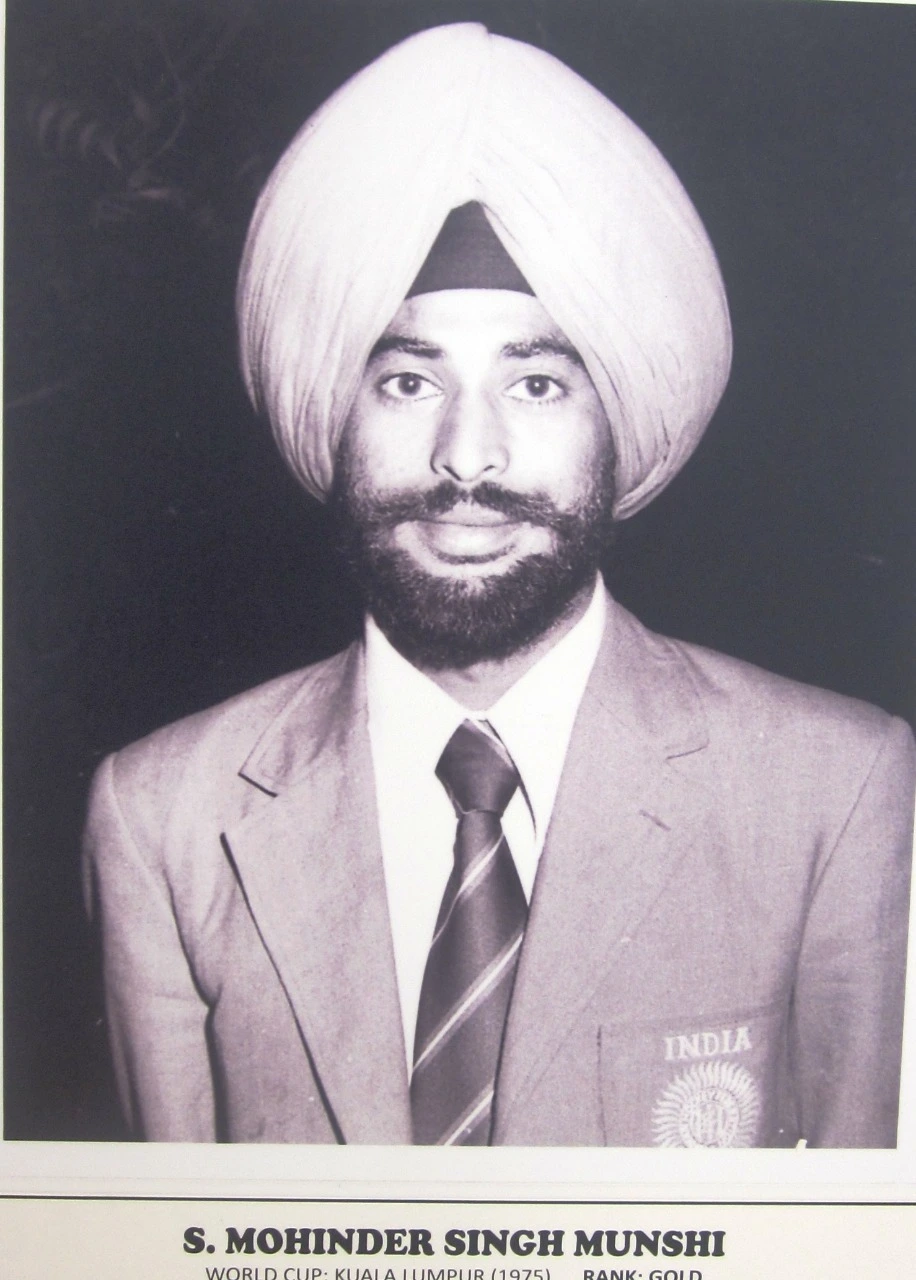

Personal information
- Full name: Mohinder Singh
- Born: 3 April 1953 Nakodar, Jalandhar, India
- Died: 19 September 1977 (aged 24) Jalandhar, India

Sport
- Sport: Field hockey
Medal record
Men's field hockey
Representing India
Hockey World Cup
Gold medal – first place	1975 Kuala Lumpur	Team
Asian Games
Silver medal – second place	1970 Bangkok	Team

Mohinder Singh (3 April 1953 – 19 September 1977) was an Indian field hockey player. He was part of the Indian team that won the 1975 Men's Hockey World Cup and he was high scorer for India scoring 4 goals in that world cup tournament. He also competed in the men's tournament at the 1976 Summer Olympics and in the 1970 Asian Games where he did not appear in any matches.

Gill worked in the Punjab Police as a sub inspector. He died in the Civil Hospital, Jalandhar "after a short illness" The report of his death gives his age as 26.
