= Peter Motzek =

Canadian field hockey player

Peter Motzek (born June 1, 1957, in Vancouver, British Columbia) is a Canadian former field hockey player who competed in the 1976 Summer Olympics.
