= Ramesh Patel (field hockey) =

New Zealand field hockey player

Ramesh Patel QSM
Personal information
- Full name: Ramesh Unka Patel
- Born: 12 September 1953 (age 72) Auckland, New Zealand

Sport
- Country: New Zealand
- Sport: Field hockey
Medal record
Men's field hockey
Representing New Zealand
Olympic Games
Gold medal – first place	1976 Montreal	Team competition

Ramesh Unka Patel QSM (born 12 September 1953) is a former field hockey player from New Zealand, who was a member of the national team that won gold at the 1976 Summer Olympics in Montreal.

In the 1988 New Year Honours, Patel was awarded the Queen's Service Medal for community service.
