= Anthony Cruz (field hockey) =

Malaysian field hockey player (born 1956)

Personal information
- Nationality: Malaysian
- Born: 1 October 1956 (age 69)

Sport
- Sport: Field hockey

Anthony Cruz (born 1 October 1956) is a Malaysian field hockey player. He competed in the men's tournament at the 1976 Summer Olympics.
