= Serge Dubois =

Belgian hockey player

Personal information
- Nationality: Belgian
- Born: 4 March 1954 (age 72)

Sport
- Sport: Field hockey

Serge Dubois (born 4 March 1954) is a Belgian field hockey player. He competed in the men's tournament at the 1976 Summer Olympics.
