= Chand Singh =

Indian field hockey player

Personal information
- Born: 25 March 1949 (age 77)

Sport
- Sport: Field hockey
Medal record
Men's field hockey
Representing India
Hockey World Cup
Silver medal – second place	1973 Amsterdam	Team
Asian Games
Silver medal – second place	1974 Tehran	Team

Chand Singh (born 25 March 1949) is an Indian field hockey player. He competed in the men's tournament at the 1976 Summer Olympics.
