= Ian Cooke (field hockey) =

Australian field hockey player

Olympic medal record

Men's field hockey
Silver medal – second place	1976 Montreal	Team competition

Ian Cooke (born 6 March 1952) is a retired field hockey player from Australia, who was a member of the team that won the silver medal at the 1976 Summer Olympics in Montreal, Quebec, Canada.
