= Varinder Singh (field hockey) =

Indian field hockey player (1947–2022)

Medal record

Men's field hockey

Representing India

Olympic Games
Bronze medal – third place	1972 Munich	Team

Hockey World Cup
Silver medal – second place	1973 Amsterdam	Team
Gold medal – first place	1975 Kuala Lumpur	Team

Asian Games
Silver medal – second place	1974 Tehran	Team
Silver medal – second place	1978 Bangkok	Team

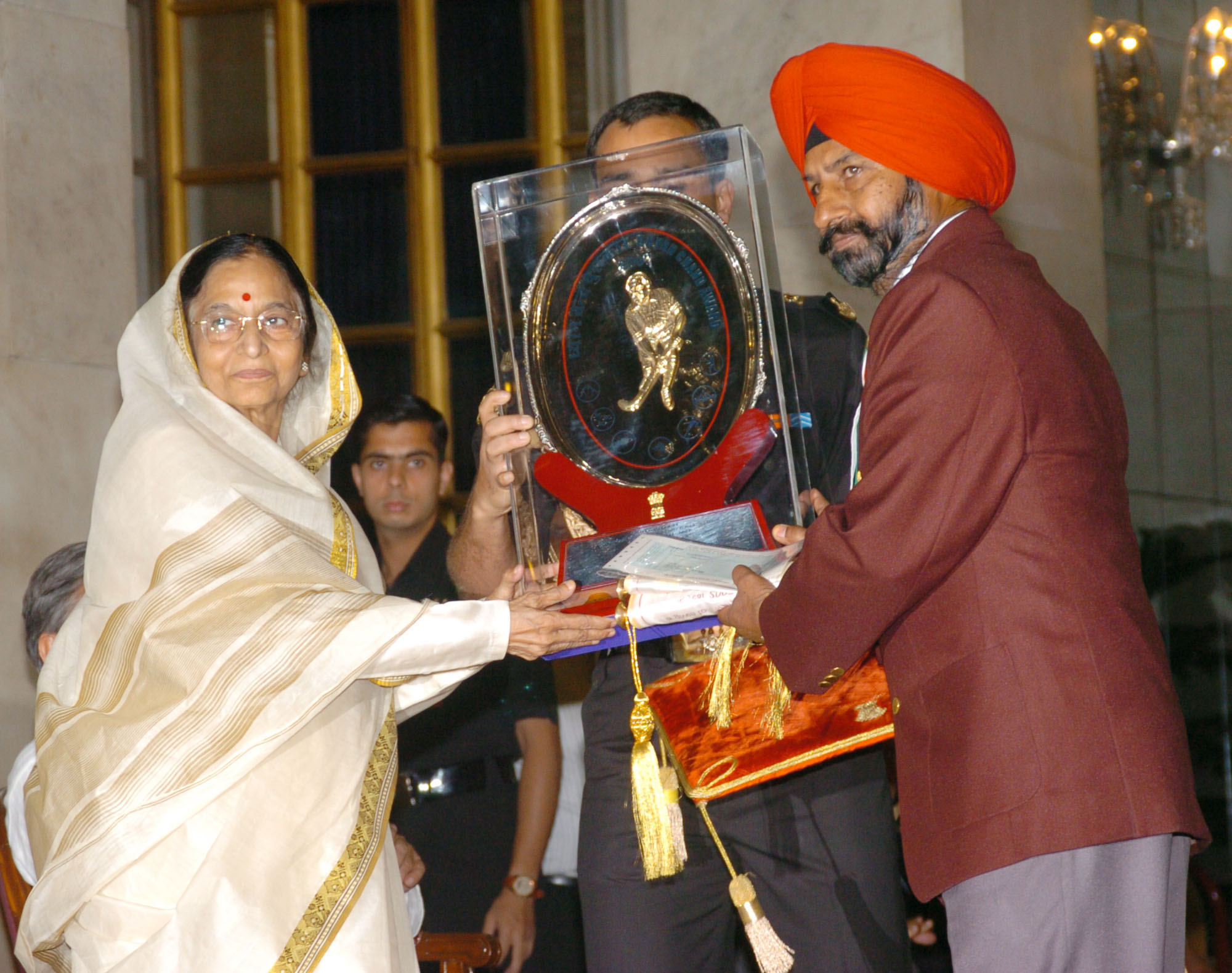
The President, Smt. Pratibha Patil presenting the Dhyan Chand Award to Shri Varinder Singh for Hockey at a glittering function, in New Delhi on 29 August 2007

Varinder Singh (16 May 1947 – 28 June 2022) was an Indian field hockey player.

He won a bronze medal at the 1972 Summer Olympics in Munich. He also competed at the 1976 Summer Olympics.

Singh died on 28 June 2022 at a hospital in Jalandhar, at the age of 75.
