= Michel Van Tuyckom =

Belgian hockey player

Personal information
- Nationality: Belgian
- Born: 23 November 1954 (age 71) Uccle, Belgium

Sport
- Sport: Field hockey

Michel Van Tuyckom (born 23 November 1954) is a Belgian field hockey player. He competed in the men's tournament at the 1976 Summer Olympics.
