= Gustavo Paolucci =

Argentine field hockey player

Personal information
- Nationality: Argentine
- Born: 28 January 1954 (age 72)

Sport
- Sport: Field hockey

Gustavo Paolucci (born 28 January 1954) is an Argentine field hockey player. He competed in the men's tournament at the 1976 Summer Olympics.
