= Arshad Mahmood (field hockey) =

Pakistani field hockey player

Personal information
- Born: 1 November 1947 (age 78)
Medal record
Men's field hockey
Representing Pakistan
Olympic Games
Bronze medal – third place	1976 Montreal	Team competition

Arshad Mahmood (born 1 November 1947) is a former field hockey player on the Pakistan Men's National Hockey Team. He won a bronze medal at the 1976 Summer Olympics in Montreal, Quebec, Canada.
