= Ashok Diwan =

Indian field hockey player

Personal information
- Nationality: Indian
- Born: 9 August 1954 (age 71)
- Education: SGTB Khalsa College, University of Delhi

Sport
- Sport: Field hockey

Ashok Diwan (born 9 August 1954) is an Indian field hockey player. He competed in the men's tournament at the 1976 Summer Olympics.
