= Saleem Nazim =

Pakistani field hockey player (1955–2025)

Personal information
- Born: 1 January 1955 Lyallpur, West Punjab, Pakistan
- Died: 7 May 2025 (aged 70) Faisalabad, Punjab, Pakistan
Medal record
Men's field hockey
Representing Pakistan
Olympic Games
Bronze medal – third place	1976 Montreal	Team competition

Saleem Nazim (Urdu: سلیم ناظم; 1 January 1955 – 7 May 2025) was a Pakistani field hockey player. He played for the Pakistan men's national team. He won the bronze medal in 1976 Summer Olympics in Montreal, Quebec, Canada.

Nazim died on 7 May 2025, at the age of 70. He was interred at Ghulam Muhammadabad graveyard in Faisalabad the following day.
