= Jorge Disera =

Argentine hockey player

Personal information
- Nationality: Argentine
- Born: 9 June 1949 (age 76)

Sport
- Sport: Field hockey

Jorge Disera (born 9 June 1949) is an Argentine field hockey player. He competed in the men's tournament at the 1976 Summer Olympics.
