= Jean-Claude Moraux =

Belgian hockey player

Personal information
- Nationality: Belgian
- Born: 1 April 1951 (age 75) Schaerbeek, Belgium

Sport
- Sport: Field hockey

Jean-Claude Moraux (born 1 April 1951) is a Belgian field hockey player. He competed at the 1972 Summer Olympics and the 1976 Summer Olympics.
