= Ajit Singh (field hockey) =

Indian field hockey player

Personal information
- Born: 2 March 1952 (age 74)

Sport
- Sport: Field hockey
Medal record
Men's field hockey
Representing India
Hockey World Cup
Silver medal – second place	1973 Amsterdam	Team
Asian Games
Silver medal – second place	1974 Tehran	Team

Ajit Singh (born 2 March 1952) is an Indian field hockey player. He competed in the men's tournament at the 1976 Summer Olympics.

Ajit Singh is the brother of Harmik Singh, and the father of Gagan Ajit Singh.
