= Ronald Riley =

Australian field hockey player

Medal record

Men's field hockey

Representing Australia

Olympic Games
Silver medal – second place	1968 Mexico City	Team competition
Silver medal – second place	1976 Montreal	Team competition

Ronald William "Ron" Riley OAM (born 14 September 1947) is a retired field hockey striker from Australia, who twice won the silver medal with the Men's National Team, first at the 1968 Summer Olympics in Mexico City and then eight years later, at the 1976 Summer Olympics in Montreal. He was educated at James Cook Boys High School Kogarah and Ramsgate Public School.

Riley was awarded the Medal of the Order of Australia in 1995 for service to hockey.

== International tournaments ==
- 1968 – Olympic Games, Mexico City (2nd)
- 1972 – Olympic Games, Munich (5th)
- 1976 – Olympic Games, Montreal (2nd)
- 1980 – Champions Trophy, Karachi (3rd)
- 1980 – Olympic Games, Moscow (DNC)
