= Bruno De Clynsen =

Belgian field hockey player

Personal information
- Nationality: Belgian
- Born: 8 February 1954 (age 72) Berchem-Sainte-Agathe, Belgium

Sport
- Sport: Field hockey

Bruno De Clynsen (born 8 February 1954) is a Belgian field hockey player. He competed in the men's tournament at the 1976 Summer Olympics.
