= Malcolm Poole =

Australian field hockey player

Olympic medal record

Men's Field hockey
| Silver medal – second place | 1976 Montreal | Team competition |

Malcolm Poole (born 6 November 1949) is a retired field hockey player from Australia, who was a member of the team that won the silver medal at the 1976 Summer Olympics in Montreal, Quebec, Canada.
