= Reg Plummer (field hockey) =

Canadian field hockey player

Reginald ("Reg") Plummer (born August 6, 1953 in Sudbury, Ontario) is a field hockey player from Canada. Plummer participated in two consecutive Summer Olympics for his native country, starting in 1976 in Montreal, Quebec, Canada. There he finished in tenth place with the Men's National Team, just like the team did in Los Angeles, California (1984). Plummer later became the president of the Canadian Field Hockey Association.

Reg Plummer is active in field hockey in Ottawa, Canada as a club coach with Outaouais Field hockey club, high school coach with Merivale High School and as a player on both club tournament teams and with the travelling Masters/Veterans international club The Fighting Haddocks.

== International senior competitions ==
- 1976 – Olympic Games, Montreal (10th)
- 1984 – Olympic Games, Los Angeles (10th)
