= Coen Kranenberg =

Dutch field hockey player

Personal information
- Nationality: Dutch
- Born: 28 September 1947 (age 78) Amsterdam, Netherlands

Sport
- Sport: Field hockey

Coen Kranenberg (born 28 September 1947) is a Dutch field hockey player. His team placed fourth at the 1972 Summer Olympics and the 1976 Summer Olympics.
