= Fred Hoos =

Canadian field hockey player

Fred Hoos (8 December 1953 in Maracaibo, Venezuela – 25 December 1983) was a Canadian field hockey player.

Fred Hoos was a member of the silver medal winning teams at the 1975 and 1979 Pan American Games as well as of the gold medal winning team at the 1983 Pan American Games. He also competed in the 1976 Summer Olympics.

Soon after winning the gold medal, Fred Hoos died from cancer at the age of 30.
