= Paul Litjens =

Dutch field hockey player (1946–2023)

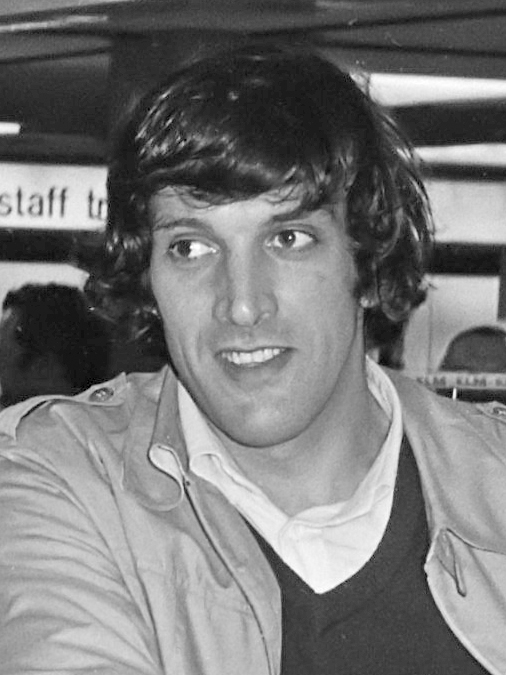
- Litjens in 1978

Personal information
- Full name: Paulus Tarcisius Maria "Paul" Litjens
- Nationality: Dutch
- Born: 9 November 1947 Loon op Zand, Netherlands
- Died: 13 December 2023 (aged 76)

Sport
- Country: Netherlands
- Sport: Field hockey
- Event: Men's team
- Club: Kampong, Utrecht

Paul Litjens (9 November 1947 – 13 December 2023) was a Dutch field hockey player. He played 177 matches with the Netherlands national team, scoring 268 goals, an international record he held from 1982 to 2004.

== Biography ==
Litjens played for hockey clubs in Uden and Zaanstad before joining HC Kampong of Utrecht. He was a member of the Dutch team that became World Champion in 1973 and participated in the 1972 and 1976 Summer Olympics. In both these Olympics, the Dutch team took a fourth place. In 1981 Litjens and the Dutch team won the Champions Trophy in Karachi.

Litjens specialized in the penalty corner and was a prolific goal scorer. He was the top scorer in the Olympic Games of 1976 and at the 1981 Champions Trophy.

Litjens was the brand ambassador of Rucanor. He appeared in the poster for its Karachi King Super hockey stick.

Litjens died on 13 December 2023, at the age of 76.

== See also ==
- List of men's field hockey players with 100 or more international goals
