= Wong Choon Hin =

Malaysian field hockey player (1950–2025)

Personal information
- Born: 19 March 1950
- Died: 26 November 2025 (aged 75)

Sport
- Sport: Field hockey
Medal record
Men's field hockey
Representing Malaysia
Asian Games
Bronze medal – third place	1974 Tehran	Team

Wong Choon Hin (19 March 1950 – 26 November 2025) was a Malaysian field hockey player. He competed at the 1972 Summer Olympics and the 1976 Summer Olympics. Wong died on 26 November 2025, at the age of 75.
