= David Bell (field hockey) =

Australian field hockey player

Personal information
- Full name: David Ian Bell
- Born: 11 March 1955 (age 71) Melbourne, Victoria
- Height: 5 ft 6 1/2 in (169 cm)
- Weight: 143 lb (65 kg)
Medal record
Men's field hockey
Representing Australia
Olympic Games
Silver medal – second place	1976 Montreal	Team competition

David Ian Bell, OAM (born 11 March 1955 in Melbourne) is a retired field hockey player from Australia, who was part of the team that won the silver medal at the 1976 Summer Olympics in Montreal, Quebec, Canada.

He attended Aquinas College, Perth.

Bell was first selected for Western Australia in 1974 and was a member of the Australia that won a silver medal at 1976 Montreal Olympics. The Australian hockey team boycotted the 1980 Summer Olympics. The Australian team finished fourth at the 1984 Summer Olympics. He captained the Australian team that won the 1986 Hockey World Cup.

He was the head coach of the Australia women's national field hockey team and the Australian Institute of Sport women's program from 2001 to 2004. Major coaching results were:

- 2001: 3rd – Champions Trophy
- 2002: 4th – World Cup; 4th – Champions Trophy; 3rd – Commonwealth Games
- 2003: 1st – Champions Trophy
- 2004: 5th – Athens Olympics

== Recognition ==
- 1987 – Medal of the Order of Australia in 1987 for his services to hockey
- 1997 – inducted into WA Hall of Champions
- 2004 – inducted into the Sport Australia Hall of Fame.
- 2008 – inducted into Hockey Australia Hall of Fame
