= Victor Philips =

Indian field hockey player (born 1950)

Personal information
- Full name: Victor John Philips
- Born: 1 September 1950 (age 76) Madras State, India

Sport
- Sport: Field hockey
- Position: Right Out
Senior career
Years	Team	Caps	Goals
–	Indian Railways	-	-
National team
Years	Team	Caps	Goals
–	India		-
Medal record
Men's field hockey
Representing India
Olympic Games
Bronze medal – third place	1972 Munich	Team
World Cup
Silver medal – second place	1973 Amsterdam	Team
Gold medal – first place	1975 Kuala Lumpur	Team
Asian Games
Silver medal – second place	1974 Tehran	Team
Silver medal – second place	1978 Bangkok	Team

Victor John Philips (born 1 September 1950) is a retired Indian professional field hockey player. A former captain who played as a Right Out, he led the Indian national team during the 1978 World Cup, and was a member of the side that won its 1975 edition. He was also a part of the bronze medal-winning squad at the 1972 Munich Olympics. Philips's older brother John Peter represented India at three Olympic Games from 1960 to 1968, winning silver, gold and bronze medals respectively.

About his game, S. Dinakar of The Hindu wrote, "The striking aspects of Philips' game were his speed – he used to practice sprints regularly – and the ability to dribble. Time and again he would leave the defenders in a daze, cutting in dangerously from the right to score or producing defence- splitting crosses. He had his own style of converting penalty strokes, taking a step back, before moving up to push." Mir Ranjan Negi called him "one of the best outside rights India ever produced." In recognition of his contribution to field hockey, Philips was given the award for lifetime achievement by the government of India in 2000.
