= Jorge Fábregas (field hockey) =

Spanish field hockey player (born 1947)

Personal information
- Nationality: Spanish
- Born: 26 July 1947 (age 78) Barcelona, Spain

Sport
- Sport: Field hockey

Jorge Fábregas (born 26 July 1947) is a Spanish field hockey player. He competed at the 1968 Summer Olympics, the 1972 Summer Olympics and the 1976 Summer Olympics.
