= Peter Trump =

Field hockey player

Olympic medal record

Men's field hockey

Representing West Germany
Gold medal – first place	1972 Munich	Team competition

Peter Trump (born 3 December 1950) is a German former field hockey player who was a member of the West German team that won the gold medal at the 1972 Summer Olympics in Munich. He also competed at the 1976 Summer Olympics.
