= Jim Irvine (field hockey) =

Australian field hockey player

Olympic medal record

Men's Field hockey
Silver medal – second place	1976 Montreal	Team competition

James Irvine (born 2 December 1948) is a retired field hockey defender from Australia, who was a member of the national team that won the silver medal at the 1976 Summer Olympics in Montreal, Quebec, Canada. He was also a member of the team that finished fourth at the 1984 Summer Olympics in Los Angeles.

Irvine was born in Sydney, New South Wales. After his career he became a hockey coach. Irvine was the assistant of head coach Terry Walsh with the Men's National Team at the 2000 Summer Olympics, where The Kookaburras finished third. Later on he went to the Netherlands, where he coached Amsterdam for three seasons (2001–2004) and won the Dutch title twice.
