= Uli Vos =

German field hockey player

Personal information
- Born: 2 September 1946 Mönchengladbach
- Died: 1 December 2017 (aged 71) Mönchengladbach
Medal record
Men's Field Hockey
Representing West Germany
Olympic Games
Gold medal – first place	1972 Munich	Team competition

Uli Vos (2 September 1946 – 1 December 2017) was a German field hockey player. At the 1972 Munich Olympics, Vos was a member of the gold-medal winning West German field hockey team. He also played at club level for Gladbacher HTC.
