= Greg Browning =

Australian field hockey player (born 1953)

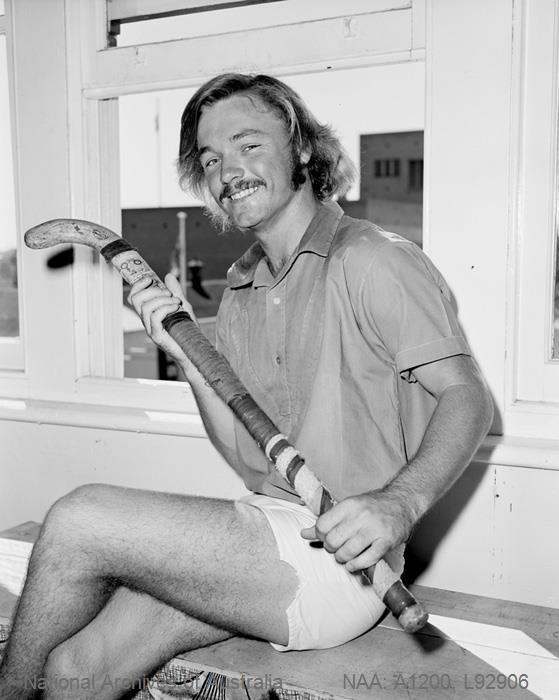
- Browning in 1971

Personal information
- Full name: Gregory Charles Browning
- Born: 14 February 1953 (age 73)
Medal record
Men's field hockey
Representing Australia
Olympic Games
Silver medal – second place	1976 Montreal	Team competition

Gregory Charles Browning (born 14 February 1953) is a retired field hockey player from Australia, who won the silver medal at the 1976 Summer Olympics in Montreal, Quebec, Canada.

He was also Australia's youngest senior team player, making his debut at 16 years of age. He was the very successful coach of the Queensland Blades in the Australian Hockey League.

In 2009 Browning was inducted into the Queensland Sport Hall of Fame.

Greg Browning was first selected for the Queensland Open Team in 1969 and he continuously represented his state for a period of 15 years until 1983. He was at the time the youngest player ever selected in the Queensland Open Team.

Greg was selected to play for Australia first in 1969 and every year after that until 1982. He was selected for three Olympics first in 1972 in Munich, 1976 in Montreal (Silver Medal) and Moscow in 1980 when the team withdrew on Federal Government insistence. He attended four World Cups first in 1971 in Barcelona, then 1973 in Kuala Lumpur, 1978 in Buenos Aires where the team won a bronze medal and finally in 1982 in Bombay (a silver medal). He also attended 3 Championship Trophies in 1978 Lahore (Silver Medal), 1980 Kuala Lumpur (Bronze Medal) and Amsterdam (Silver Medal).

He was employed by the Brisbane Hockey Association in 1996 as Coaching / Athlete Development Officer and was appointed Queensland's Academy of Sports / NTC (Blades) Coach from 1997 to 2008. He coached the Queensland Blades team to numerous Australian Hockey League titles and was runner up on several occasions.

Greg Browning has been recognised by Hockey Queensland when he was first inducted into Hockey Queensland's Hall of Fame in 2002 and further recognised with Distinguished Player Award when initiated in 2008. He was also named in Queensland's Team of the Century in 2008. He was awarded Queensland's Hockey Association Award of Merit in 1995.

He has served on numerous Queensland committees – member Coaching and Development Committee 2002 to 2008, member of Appointments committee for Coaches 2000 to 2008, Manager's appointment committee in 2008 and also Appointments committee for selectors 2008.

From 1999 to 2008 he was a selector for Queensland Open, U/21 and Country men, also a Queensland U/18 Men's selector from 1999 to 2008. Greg also served as Australian Open Men's selectors from 1989 to 1995.

Greg started his career as a player with Redcliffe club before moving to Bulimba as Player / Coach and then to South West United as Player Coach. He represented Brisbane Hockey Association as a Player from 1969 to 1983.
