= Jean-François Gilles =

Belgian hockey player

Personal information
- Nationality: Belgian
- Born: 4 May 1946 (age 79) Ixelles, Belgium

Sport
- Sport: Field hockey

Jean-François Gilles (born 4 May 1946) is a Belgian former field hockey player. He competed at the 1968 Summer Olympics, the 1972 Summer Olympics and the 1976 Summer Olympics.
