= Guy Miserque =

Belgian field hockey player (1945–2020)

Personal information
- Nationality: Belgian
- Born: 16 July 1945 Froidchapelle, Belgium
- Died: 9 April 2020 (aged 74)

Sport
- Sport: Field hockey

Guy Miserque (16 July 1945 – 9 April 2020) was a Belgian field hockey player. He competed at the 1964, 1968, 1972 and 1976 Summer Olympics.

Miserque started playing hockey in Woluwe-Saint-Pierre with Park Woluwe when he was about 9 years old. He won the Belgian cup with that team in 1964 and then transferred to Uccle Sport, where he won the national championship 10 times. They played three finals of the EuroHockey Club Champions Cup, in 1976, 1977 and 1984.

Miserque played 190 times for the Belgian national hockey team, and was seen as the best Belgian player from the 1960s until the 1980s, and perhaps of the whole 20th century. He was crowned player of the year in 1966. He competed at four consecutive Olympic Games and only missed out on the 1980 Moscow Olympics because Belgium boycotted these.

Professionally, Miserque was a physical education teacher.

Miserque died following a protracted illness on 9 April 2020. He was 74.
