= Ashok Kumar (field hockey) =

Indian field hockey player

Ashok Kumar Singh
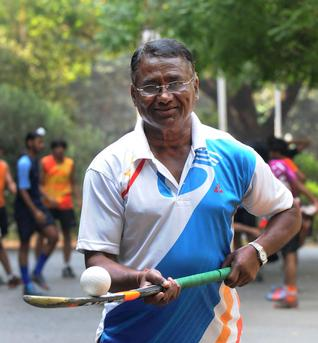

Personal information
- Full name: Ashok Kumar Singh
- Born: 1 June 1950 (age 76) Meerut, Uttar Pradesh, India
- Height: 5 ft 7 in (1.70 m)

Sport
- Sport: Field hockey
Senior career
Years	Team	Caps	Goals
–	Mohun Bagan	-	-
–	Indian Airlines	-	-
National team
Years	Team	Caps	Goals
1970–19??	India		-
Medal record
Men's field hockey
Representing India
Olympic Games
Bronze medal – third place	1972 Munich	Team
World Cup
Bronze medal – third place	1971 Barcelona	Team
Silver medal – second place	1973 Amsterdam	Team
Gold medal – first place	1975 Kuala Lumpur	Team
Asian Games
Silver medal – second place	1970 Bangkok	Team
Silver medal – second place	1974 Tehran	Team
Silver medal – second place	1978 Bangkok	Team

Ashok Kumar (born 1 June 1950) is an Indian former professional field hockey player. He is the son of the Indian hockey player Dhyan Chand. Kumar was known for his exceptional skills and ball control. He was a member of the Indian team that won the 1975 World Cup.

He was awarded the Arjuna Award in 1974 and, in 1975, scored the winning goal against Pakistan to achieve India's only win in the World Cup. He was awarded with Yash Bharati by the Government of Uttar Pradesh in the 2013. In 2024, he was awarded the Hockey India Major Dhyan Chand Lifetime Achievement Award.

== Career ==
Ashok Kumar played for Rajasthan University in 1966-67 and All India Universities in 1968-69. Thereafter, he moved to Calcutta to play for Mohun Bagan Club and represented Bengal in the National Championships in Bangalore in 1971. He later joined Indian Airlines and represented it in national tournaments. He made his international debut in 1970 when he was included in the team for the Asian Games in Bangkok, losing the title to Pakistan. He also took part in the 1974 and 1978 Asian Games held at Tehran and Bangkok respectively, winning silver medals in those two games.

Kumar represented India in the Olympic Games twice, in 1972 in Munich and in 1976 in Montreal. In 1972, India finished third and, in 1976, India finished seventh, the first time since 1928 that India was not in top three. He played at the Pesta Sukha International Tournament in Singapore in 1971 and captained the team to the 1979 Esanda Hockey Tournament in Perth, Western Australia. He played for the All-Asian star team, where his father Dhyan Chand watched him play for the first time in 1974, and was selected twice for the World XI team.

=== At the World Cup ===
He was a member of the team that won the bronze medal at the first World Cup in Barcelona in 1971 and silver at the second World Cup in Amsterdam in 1973. The highlight of his career was the 1975 Hockey World Cup in Kuala Lumpur where he scored an important goal in the final match for India against Pakistan. On a pass from Surjit Singh, Kumar hit the ball goalwards. The ball hit the corner of the post and bounced out, but for a fraction of a second the ball had been in the goal and, despite protests by Pakistan, the Malaysian umpire confirmed the goal. His fourth and final appearance in the World Cup was in the 1978 World Cup in Argentina when India was relegated to sixth position.

On retirement from active sports, he was appointed manager of the hockey teams of Indian Airlines and Air India.
