= Horst Dröse =

Field hockey player

Olympic medal record

Men's Field Hockey

Representing West Germany
Gold medal – first place	1972 Munich	Team competition

Horst Dröse (born 23 November 1949 in Frankfurt am Main) is a former field hockey player from Germany, who was a member of the West German squad that won the gold medal at the 1972 Summer Olympics in Munich. He also competed in the 1976 Summer Olympics, as the West German team finished fifth.
