= Ajit Pal Singh =

Indian field hockey player

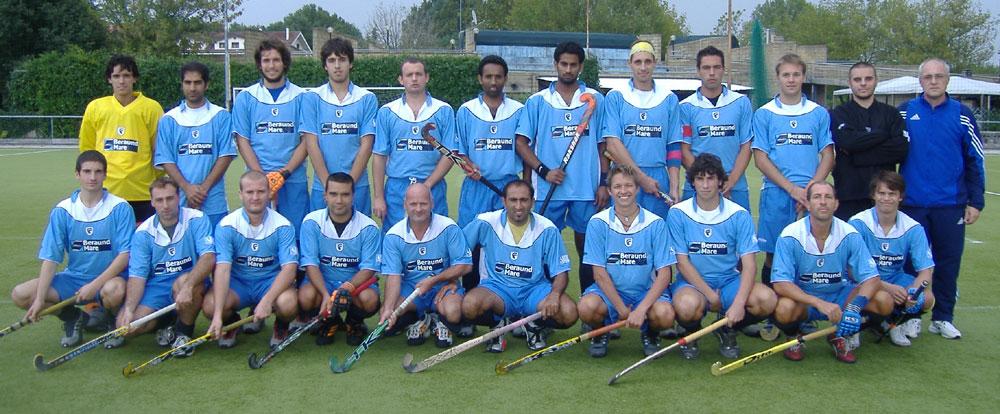

Personal information
- Full name: Ajit Pal Singh Kular
- Born: 1 April 1947 (age 79) Sansarpur, Punjab, India
- Height: 5 ft 10 in (1.78 m)

Sport
- Sport: Field hockey
- Position: Halfback
Medal record
Men's field hockey
Representing India
Olympic Games
Bronze medal – third place	1968 Mexico City	Team
Bronze medal – third place	1972 Munich	Team
Hockey World Cup
Gold medal – first place	1975 Kuala Lumpur	Team
Silver medal – second place	1973 Amsterdam	Team
Bronze medal – third place	1971 Barcelona	Team
Asian Games
Silver medal – second place	1970 Bangkok	Team
Silver medal – second place	1974 Tehran	Team

Ajit Pal Singh Kular (also spelled Ajitpal Singh, born 1 April 1947) was an Indian professional field hockey player from Sansarpur, Punjab. He was the captain of the Indian hockey team. He was conferred the Arjuna Award in 1970, and awarded it in 1972. He played at centre half position. He was captain of the Indian team at the Hockey World Cup 1975 held in Kuala Lumpur, Malaysia.

He represented India in three Olympics from 1968 through 1976, winning bronze medals in his first two Olympic Games. He was appointed India's chef de mission for 2012 Summer Olympics. It was the first time that a sports person was given this opportunity, as earlier this position went to either politicians or administrators. However he could not make it to the event due to severe spondylitis. Seven member IOA, Indian Olympic Association Committee selected in April 2012 Ajit Pal Singh as Chef de Mission for Indian mission in London 2012 Olympics. He is also at present the organising member of All India Balwant Singh Kapur Hockey Tournament for Mata Parkash Kaur Cup held every year for school boys under-16. He is a recipient of the civilian honour of Padma Shri (1992).

== Early life ==
Singh was born on 1 April 1947 at Sansarpur, a small village near Jalandhar Cantonment of Punjab, which was famous as a breeding ground for the hockey stars as this village had been home to a number of international hockey players who had done the nation proud with their commendable performance in the game. As a young man he joined the newly raised Border Security Force(BSF) and captained the Hockey team of BSF. Under his captaincy BSF hockey team lifted the Nehru Trophy in 1975. He left the force as an Assistant Commandant.

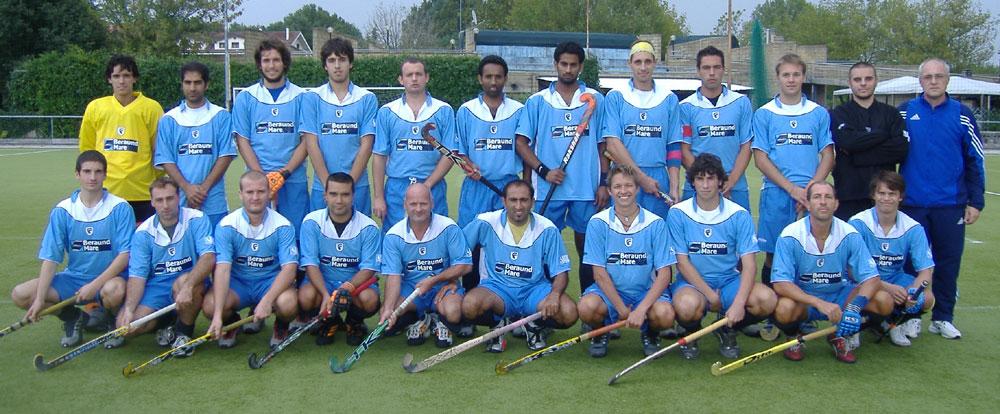
Ajit Pal Singh with team members In 2008-09

== Domestic hockey ==
At the age of 7 or 8 years, little Ajit had been handed over a hockey stick by his uncle. He studied at the Cantonment Board Higher Secondary School, Jalandhar Cantonment and at the age of 16 years represented the Punjab State Schools Hockey team in 1963. During his initial days, Ajit used to play at the Full Back position. He moved to the Lyallpur Khalsa College, Jalandhar in 1964, and stayed there for a period of 4 years leading the college to 3 victories in the Punjab University College tournament. It was here that Ajit shifted from Full Back to Center Half, his real position. He was named the Captain of Punjab University Hockey team in 1966, and represented Indian Universities' Hockey team in 1968.

== International hockey ==
Ajit Pal Singh made his debut in International Hockey with a tournament played at Bombay in 1960. He was selected in the Indian Hockey team that visited Japan in 1966, and participated in the Pre-Olympic tournament held in London the next year. Further, he played in the Olympic Games Mexico 1968 and delivered a brilliant performance although the Indian Hockey squad stood at 3rd spot at the event. Ajit played for the Indian Hockey team at Bangkok Asian Games 1970, and was named the Captain of the Indian squad that played at Post Shuan Tournament held at Singapore in 1971, and Tehran Asian Games 1974. The Indian team managed to grab a Silver Medal at both the events. He was a part of the Indian squad at Munich Olympic Games 1972, where the team finished at 3rd spot getting a Bronze Medal. He led the Indian Hockey team to World Cup Hockey tournament held at Kuala Lumpur in 1975 leading the team to win the tournament and also at Montreal Olympic Games 1976 where the Indian team fared really badly and finished at the 7th spot. After this debacle, Ajit Pal Singh retired from International Hockey, although he participated in his last International Hockey event in 1980 at Champions Trophy Tournament, Karachi. Even after his retirement from International Hockey, Ajit continued to play in Domestic Hockey Circuit for Border Security Force (B.S.F.) team.

== Awards ==
As an honour for his outstanding contribution to Indian Hockey, Ajit Pal Singh was conferred upon the Arjuna Award in 1970. Further, he was also bestowed upon the Padma Shri award in 1992.

== See also ==
- List of Indian hockey captains in Olympics
- Field hockey in India
- India men's national field hockey team
