= Wolfgang Strödter =

German field hockey player (1948–2021)

Personal information
- Born: 5 April 1948
- Died: 4 June 2021 (aged 73)
Medal record
Men's Field Hockey
Representing West Germany
Olympic Games
Gold medal – first place	1972 Munich	Team competition

Wolfgang Strödter (5 April 1948 – 4 June 2021) was a field hockey player from Germany, who was a member of the West-German team that won the gold medal at the 1972 Summer Olympics in Munich.

Strödter was a terrific hitter of penalty corners. He coached the West German Women's National Team at the 1988 Summer Olympics in Seoul, South Korea.
