= Trevor Smith (field hockey) =

Field hockey player

Olympic medal record

Men's field hockey
Silver medal – second place	1976 Montreal	Team competition

Trevor Smith (born 15 April 1949) is a retired field hockey player from Australia, who was a member of the national team that won the silver medal at the 1976 Summer Olympics in Montreal, Quebec, Canada. He also went to the 1984 Summer Olympics in Los Angeles, where the Australian team missed the medals, finishing fourth.

== Personal ==
Trevor was involved with the business Hockeyworld along with younger brothers Roger Smith and Terry Smith who also played hockey for Australia.

== Field hockey ==
=== International hockey ===
He made his Olympic debut at the 1976 Summer Olympics in Montreal where the Kookaburras won a silver medal and also performed at the 1984 Summer Olympics.
