= Terry Walsh (field hockey) =

Field hockey player

Personal information
- Nationality: Australian
- Born: 20 November 1953 (age 72) Kalgoorlie, Australia

Sport
- Sport: Field hockey
- Position: Striker
- Team: Australia
Medal record
Men's field hockey
Representing Australia
Olympic Games
Silver medal – second place	1976 Montreal	Team competition

Terence ("Terry") Arthur Walsh (born 20 November 1953) is a field hockey coach and a former player who played as a striker for Australia. He represented Australia in two Olympic Games, winning a silver medal at the 1976 Games in Montreal. Following his playing career, he became a coach and had successful spells with Australia and Netherlands. He also coached the Indian men's team and guided the team to its first gold medal at the Asian Games after 16 years.

== Coaching career ==
Walsh was the head coach of the Australia men's national team during the 1990s. Under him, the team won gold medals at the 1998 Commonwealth Games and 1999 Champions Trophy and bronze at the 2000 Olympic Games. He then coached the Netherlands men's team to a silver medal finish at the 2004 Olympics. He was appointed as the coach of the India men's team in 2013, before he submitted his resignation in October 2014, citing "difficulty adjusting to the decision making style of the sporting bureaucracy in India" as the reason. However, he withdrew his resignation the next day. Under him, at the 2014 Asian Games, the team won the gold medal, its first in 16 years. Citing "bureaucratic interference", he quit again in November 2014. In 2014 he became the head coach of Kalinga Lancers in the Hockey India League.
