= Ric Charlesworth =

Australian politician and sportsman

Ric Charlesworth AO

Member of the Australian Parliament for Perth
- In office 5 March 1983 – 8 February 1993
- Preceded by: Ross McLean
- Succeeded by: Stephen Smith

Personal details
- Born: Richard Ian Charlesworth; 6 February 1952 (age 74) Subiaco, Western Australia, Australia
- Party: Australian Labor Party
- Education: University of Western Australia
- Occupation: Hockey player
- Cricket career

Cricket information
- Batting: Left-handed
- Role: Opening Batsman

Domestic team information
- Years: Team
- 1969–1970, 1976–1982: West Perth
- 1970–1976: University Cricket Club

Career statistics
Competition	FC
Matches	47
Runs scored	2327
Batting average	30.22
100s/50s	1/16
Top score	101*
Balls bowled	8
Wickets	0
Bowling average	-
5 wickets in innings	0
10 wickets in match	0
Best bowling
Catches/stumpings	34
- Field hockey career
- Sport: Field hockey
Youth career
- Team
- –: Christ Church Grammar School
Senior career
Years	Team	Caps	Goals
–	UWA Hockey Club	-	-
National team
Years	Team	Caps	Goals
1972–1988	Australia (Kookaburras)	227	(85)
Medal record
Men's field hockey
Representing Australia
Olympic Games
Silver medal – second place	1976 Montréal	Team competition
World Hockey Cup
Gold medal – first place	1986 London	Team competition
Bronze medal – third place	1978 Buenos Aires	Team Competition
Bronze medal – third place	1982 Bombay	Team Competition

Richard Ian Charlesworth AO (born 6 February 1952) is an Australian sports coach and former politician. He played first-class cricket for Western Australia and international field hockey for the Kookaburras (the Australian national team), winning a silver medal at the 1976 Summer Olympics and winning the World Cup in 1986. Charlesworth served as a federal member of parliament from 1983 to 1993, representing the Labor Party. After leaving politics, he was appointed coach of the Hockeyroos (the national women's field hockey team), leading them to Olympic gold medals in 1996 and 2000. Charlesworth later coached the Kookaburras from 2009 to 2014, and has also worked in consulting roles with the New Zealand national cricket team, the Australian Institute of Sport, and the Fremantle Football Club (an Australian football team).

== Biography ==
Born in Subiaco, Western Australia, Charlesworth attended Christ Church Grammar School until he graduated in 1969. In 1976, he completed a medical degree (MB, BS) from the University of Western Australia School of Medicine. In 2002, he received an honorary Doctorate of Science at the University of Western Australia and completed a Bachelor of Arts majoring in philosophy and history also at the University of Western Australia.

His father Lester Charlesworth, a dentist, represented Western Australia in cricket between 1949 and 1951.

== Cricket ==
In 1969 Charlesworth captained the Western Australian State under 19 cricket team before going on to play A grade Club cricket for West Perth (1969–1970, 1976–82) and University Cricket Club (1970–76). He played in 47 first-class matches for Western Australia from 1972 until 1979, making 2,327 runs at an average of 30.22. He was a member of Sheffield Shield winning teams in 1972–73, 1976–77, 1977–78, and was a squad member in the winning season of 1974–75. In the 1979 Charlesworth was Captain of WA in 4 Matches

== Hockey ==
=== Player ===
Charlesworth was coached by Ray House at Christ Church Grammar School, where he was promoted to the school's first XI at an early age. He was a member of the PSA Hockey Cup (now known as the Ray House Hockey Cup) winning teams of 1966–67.

He played in and captained the Western Australia hockey team and the Australia men's field hockey team the Kookaburras. He was selected to represent Australia in five Olympic hockey teams, 1972, 1976, 1980 (captain) (Moscow Olympics were boycotted), 1984 (captain), and 1988, winning Silver at the 1976, Montreal Olympic Games. He was a member of the national team which competed in various other international tournaments including winning the World Hockey Cup in London in 1986 where he was named player of the Tournament as well as being the tournament's leading goalscorer. He retired from playing after representing Australia at the 1988 Olympics in Seoul. He played 227 games for his country and scored 85 goals.

Charlesworth was inducted into the Australian Hockey Hall of Fame in 2008, the second person to achieve this award. In 2015 he was made a Legend of the Western Australian Hall of Champions for all sports.

In 1980, while playing for The University of Western Australia Mens Hockey Club, Charlesworth also won the Olympian's Medal, an annual award presented to the player judged by umpires to be the fairest and best in men's first division competition in Western Australia. In addition, the female equivalent of this award, the Charlesworth Medal, is named in his honour.

=== Coach ===
From 1993 to 2000 Charlesworth was head coach of the Australian Women's hockey team, the Hockeyroos. During this time they won the Champion's Trophy in 1993 (Amsterdam), 1995 (Mar del Plata), 1997 (Berlin) and 1999 (Brisbane), the World Hockey Cup in 1994 (Dublin) and 1998 (Netherlands) and were gold medallists in the Atlanta Olympics in 1996 and Sydney Olympics in 2000 and 1998 Commonwealth Games in Kuala Lumpur.

Prior to his appointment as technical adviser to the men's and women's Indian hockey teams, he was the high-performance manager for the New Zealand cricket team. He was selected to act as an advisor to the newly formed hockey selection committee formed by the Indian Olympic Association.

Charlesworth has been a mentor coach to several national team coaches with the Australian Institute of Sport and a performance consultant with the Fremantle Football Club.

In 2009, Charlesworth was appointed coach of the Australian men's national hockey team, the Kookaburras. The team went on to win the 2009 Men's Hockey Champions Trophy in Melbourne, Australia; the 2010 Hockey World Cup in New Delhi, India; the 2010 Men's Hockey Champions Trophy in Mönchengladbach, Germany; the 2010 Commonwealth Games Men's Hockey Gold Medal in Delhi, India and the 2011 Men's Hockey Champions Trophy in Auckland. After coaching the Kookaburras to success at the 2014 Hockey World Cup in Netherlands, he resigned.

== Politics ==
Charlesworth was elected as the Federal Member for Perth in 1983, representing the Australian Labor Party, and was a member of parliament for 10 years until retiring in 1993. During his time in the House of Representatives Charlesworth twice represented Australia at the Olympic Games (84 and 88) and in was flag bearer for Australia in the opening ceremony in Seoul

Charlesworth said one reason for retiring from Parliament was that he never became a minister.

== Administration ==
Charlesworth was a member of the Australian Sports Commission Board 1994–97 and Western Australian Institute of Sport Board 1984–1992, 2001–2005.

== Books ==
He has written several books, including The Coach – Managing for Success and Staying at the Top, The Young Hockey Player, Shakespeare the Coach and World's Best.

== Awards ==
- Western Australian Sportsman of the Year in 1976, 1979 and 1987
- Advance Australia Award in 1984
- Member of the Order of Australia (AM) in the 1987 Queen's Birthday Honours
- Officer of the Order of Australia (AO) in the 2016 Queen's Birthday Honours
- Sport Australia Hall of Fame in 1987
- Hockey Australia Hall of Fame 2008
- Hall of Champions, WA 1995 and Legend in 2015.
- West Australian Sports Champions of the Year Award – Coach of the Year 1994–2000
- Australian Coaching Council Team Coach of the Year 1994, 1996, 1997, 1998, 1999, 2000, 2010, and 2014.
- Confederation of Australian Sport Coach of the Year 1996, 1997 and 2000
- Australian Sports Medal 2000
- Western Australia Citizen of the Year Award 2001
- Western Australian Finalist Australian of the Year 2011
- Australian Institute of Sport Coach of the Year 2010
- Inaugural Australian Institute of Sport World's Best Award 2014

Parliament of Australia
Preceded by Ross McLean	Member for Perth; 1983–1993	Succeeded by Stephen Smith
