= Field hockey at the 1976 Summer Olympics =

Field hockey at the Games of the XXI Olympiad
- Venue: Percival Molson Memorial Stadium
- Dates: 18–30 July 1976
- Teams: 11

Medalists
1st place, gold medalist(s)		New Zealand
2nd place, silver medalist(s)		Australia
3rd place, bronze medalist(s)		Pakistan

The field hockey competition at the 1976 Summer Olympics was held in the Percival Molson Memorial Stadium at the McGill University, on an artificial surface for the first time. Only a men's competition occurred.

New Zealand won the gold medal for the first time by defeating Australia 1–0 in the final. Pakistan won the bronze medal by defeating the Netherlands 3–2.

== Preliminary round ==
=== Group A ===
Pos	Team	Pld	W	D	L	GF	GA	GD	Pts	Qualification
1	Netherlands	5	5	0	0	11	3	+8	10	Semi-finals
2	Australia	5	3	0	2	14	6	+8	6 (Note: Australia and India finished on equal points at the conclusion of the pool stage, resulting in a match to determine second place in the pool. The match was contested on 26 July 1976 and Australia won 5–4 after a penalty shoot-out.)	Semi-finals
3	India	5	3	0	2	12	9	+3	6	
4	Malaysia	5	2	0	3	3	7	−4	4	
5	Canada (H)	5	1	0	4	4	11	−7	2	
6	Argentina	5	1	0	4	4	12	−8	2	

Source: Olympedia
(H) Hosts
Notes:

18 July 1976
10:00

India	4–0	Argentina
Ajit 1', 66'; Chand 17'; Surjit 49'	Report

Umpires:
Francis Steurs (BEL)
Osvaldo Pensosi (ITA)

18 July 1976
12:00

Australia	2–0	Malaysia
Riley 28'; Bell 68'	Report

Umpires:
Fritz Seegers (FRG)
Jaime Salvatella (ESP)

19 July 1976
15:00

Netherlands	3–1	India
Kruize 31'; Litjens 47', 48'	Report	Philips 37'

Umpires:
Louis-Michel Gillet (FRA)
Graham Nash (GBR)

19 July 1976
17:00

Australia	3–0	Canada
Walsh 16'; Riley 20'; Bell 41'	Report

Umpires:
Jacky Manneback (BEL)
Mohamed Abdel Gomaa (EGY)

20 July 1976
10:00

Netherlands	2–0	Malaysia
Litjens 41', 55'	Report

Umpires:
Peter Jackson (GBR)
Osvaldo Pensosi (ITA)

20 July 1976
12:00

Canada	3–1	Argentina
Hobkirk 20'; Plummer 30'; Hoos 48'	Report	J. Sabbione 60'

Umpires:
Fritz Seegers (FRG)
Sheikh Mohammad Ramzan (PAK)

21 July 1976
15:00

Australia	6–1	India
Riley 13', 30', 50'; Browning 26'; Irvine 45'; Smith 54'	Report	Surjit 21'

Umpires:
Alain Renaud (FRA)
Fritz Seegers (FRG)

21 July 1976
17:00

Malaysia	2–0	Argentina
Murugesan 68'; Ow 69'	Report

Umpires:
Graham Nash (GBR)
Francis Steurs (BEL)

22 July 1976
10:00

India	3–0	Canada
Ajit 10'; Philips 47', 69'	Report

Umpires:
Jaime Salvatella (ESP)
Mohamed Abdel Gomaa (EGY)

22 July 1976
12:00

Netherlands	2–1	Australia
Kruize 12'; Litjens 34'	Report	Bell 67'

Umpires:
Alain Renaud (FRA)
Osvaldo Pensosi (ITA)

23 July 1976
15:00

Netherlands	1–0	Argentina
Litjens 24'	Report

Umpires:
Sheikh Mohammad Ramzan (PAK)
Peter Jackson (GBR)

23 July 1976
17:00

Malaysia	1–0	Canada
Poon 62'	Report

Umpires:
Jacky Manneback (BEL)
Jaime Salvatella (ESP)

24 July 1976
10:00

India	3–0	Malaysia
Ashok 4', 16'; Surjit 60'	Report

Umpires:
Graham Nash (GBR)
Peter Jackson (GBR)

24 July 1976
12:00

Argentina	3–2	Australia
Disera 30'; Garraffo 42'; Paolucci 48'	Report	Riley 22'; Cooke 55'

Umpires:
Louis-Michel Gillet (FRA)
Fritz Seegers (FRG)

25 July 1976
17:00

Netherlands	3–1	Canada
Litjens 40', 59', 62'	Report	Motzek 3'

Umpires:
Francis Steurs (BEL)
Mohamed Ghouse (IND)

26 July 1976
13:00

Australia	1–1 (a.e.t.)	India
Charlesworth 33'	Report	Surjit 34'
Penalties
Bell (penalty shoot-out scored); Haigh (penalty shoot-out scored); Walsh (penalty shoot-out scored); Smith (penalty shoot-out scored); Charlesworth (penalty shoot-out scored)	5–4	(penalty shoot-out scored) Surjit; (penalty shoot-out scored) Ajit Pal; (penalty shoot-out scored) Ashok; (penalty shoot-out missed) Ajit; (penalty shoot-out scored) Philips

Umpires:
Louis-Michel Gillet (FRA)
Peter Paul Lathouwers (NED)

=== Group B ===
Pos	Team	Pld	W	D	L	GF	GA	GD	Pts	Qualification
1	Pakistan	4	3	1	0	16	6	+10	7	Semi-finals
2	New Zealand	4	1	2	1	6	8	−2	4 (Note: New Zealand and Spain finished on equal points at the conclusion of the pool stage, resulting in a match to determine second place in the pool. The match was contested on 26 July 1976 and New Zealand won 1–0.)	Semi-finals
3	Spain	4	1	2	1	9	7	+2	4	
4	West Germany	4	1	1	2	10	10	0	3	
5	Belgium	4	1	0	3	5	15	−10	2	
6	Kenya	0	0	0	0	0	0	0	0	Withdrew

Source: Olympedia
Notes:

18 July 1976
15:00

Pakistan	5–0	Belgium
Rashid 25', 36', 68'; Hussain 52'; Zaman 59'	Report

Umpires:
Bob Davidzon (NED)
Richard Jewell (AUS)

18 July 1976
17:00

West Germany	1–1	New Zealand
Strödter 58'	Report	R. Patel 43'

Umpires:
Gulasingam Vijayanathan (MAS)
Horacio Servetto (ARG)

19 July 1976
10:00

Spain	2–2	Pakistan
F. Fábregas 35'; Amat 62'	Report	Hussain 10'; Zaman 65'

Umpires:
Alain Renaud (FRA)
Peter Paul Lathouwers (NED)

20 July 1976
15:00

Spain	1–1	New Zealand
Amat 21'	Report	R. Patel 56'

Umpires:
Gulasingam Vijayanathan (MAS)
Bob Davidzon (NED)

21 July 1976
10:00

Pakistan	4–2	West Germany
Zaman 22', 32'; Hussain 38'; Sheikh 54'	Report	Seifert 25'; Peter 42'

Umpires:
Louis-Michel Gillet (FRA)
Horacio Servetto (ARG)

21 July 1976
12:00

New Zealand	2–1	Belgium
Maister 10'; Ineson 56'	Report	Miserque 69'

Umpires:
Mohamed Ghouse (IND)
Jorge Trotta (ARG)

22 July 1976
17:00

Spain	4–1	West Germany
Sallés 9'; Amat 31', 34', 57'	Report	Strödter 17'

Umpires:
Richard Jewell (AUS)
Gulasingam Vijayanathan (MAS)

23 July 1976
10:00

Belgium	3–2	Spain
Dubois 11', 47'; Gilles 61'	Report	Amat 9'; J. Fábregas 54'

Umpires:
Mohamed Ghouse (IND)
Peter Paul Lathouwers (NED)

24 July 1976
15:00

Pakistan	5–2	New Zealand
Sheikh 5', 32'; Zaman 9', 39'; Khan 14'	Report	Borren 25'; Ineson 47'

Umpires:
Horacio Servetto (ARG)
Peter Paul Lathouwers (NED)

24 July 1976
17:00

West Germany	6–1	Belgium
Peter 11'; Krause 19'; Lauruschkat 23'; Vos 44'; Trump 47'; Kaessmann 67'	Report	M. Vanderborght 24'

Umpires:
Jorge Trotta (ARG)
Bob Davidzon (NED)

26 July 1976
16:00

New Zealand	1–0 (a.e.t.)	Spain
R. Patel 90'	Report

Umpires:
Gulasingam Vijayanathan (MAS)
Osvaldo Pensosi (ITA)

== Classification round ==
=== Ninth to eleventh place classification ===
7–9th place semi-final
28 July
Belgium (a.e.t)	3
Argentina	2

Ninth place
29 July
Canada	2
Belgium (a.e.t)	3

==== 9–11th place semi-final ====
28 July 1976
12:00

Belgium	3–2 (a.e.t.)	Argentina
M. Vanderborght 10'; Van Tuyckom 63', 96'	Report	Ruiz 4'; Paolucci 52'

Umpires:
Richard Jewell (AUS)
Bob Davidzon (NED)

==== Ninth place game ====
29 July 1976
10:00

Canada	2–3 (a.e.t.)	Belgium
Hoos 33'; Chohan 50'	Report	Dubois 48', 68'; De Clynsen 96'

Umpires:
Jorge Trotta (ARG)
Sheikh Mohammad Ramzan (PAK)

=== Fifth to eighth place classification ===
5–8th place semi-finals
29 July
India	2
West Germany	3
29 July
Spain	2
Malaysia	1

Fifth place
30 July
West Germany	9
Spain	1
Seventh place
30 July
India	2
Malaysia	0

==== 5–8th place semi-finals ====
29 July 1976
12:00

Spain	2–1	Malaysia
Amat 7'; Ja. Arbós 58'	Report	Wong 42'

Umpires:
Osvaldo Pensosi (ITA)
Peter Paul Lathouwers (NED)

29 July 1976
17:00

India	2–3	West Germany
Mohinder 20'; Ajit Pal 66'	Report	Strödter 38', 62'; Dröse 60'

Umpires:
Richard Jewell (AUS)
Graham Nash (GBR)

==== Seventh place game ====
30 July 1976
10:00

India	2–0	Malaysia
Aslam Sher 55', 59'	Report

Umpires:
Peter Paul Lathouwers (NED)
Bob Davidzon (NED)

==== Fifth place game ====
30 July 1976
12:00

West Germany	9–1	Spain
Seifert 15', 65'; Dopp 24'; Peter 39'; Dröse 40'; Strödter 42', 45', 63'; Lauruschkat 56'	Report	Sallés 56'

Umpires:
Louis-Michel Gillet (FRA)
Mohamed Ghouse (IND)

== Medal round ==
Semi-finals
29 July
Netherlands	1
New Zealand (a.e.t)	2
29 July
Pakistan	1
Australia	2

Gold medal match
30 July
New Zealand	1
Australia	0
Bronze medal match
30 July
Netherlands	2
Pakistan	3

==== Semi-finals ====
28 July 1976
15:00

Pakistan	1–2	Australia
Rasool 1'	Report	Riley 32'; Irvine 59'

Umpires:
Fritz Seegers (FRG)
Gulasingam Vijayanathan (MAS)

28 July 1976
17:00

Netherlands	1–2 (a.e.t.)	New Zealand
Kranenberg 26'	Report	Borren 29'; Ineson 87'

Umpires:
Horacio Servetto (ARG)
Alain Renaud (FRA)

==== Bronze medal match ====
30 July 1976
15:00

Netherlands	2–3	Pakistan
Litjens 33', 58'	Report	Rasool 14'; Khan 53'; Hussain 68'

Umpires:
Horacio Servetto (ARG)
Gulasingam Vijayanathan (MAS)

==== Gold medal match ====
30 July 1976
17:00

New Zealand	1–0	Australia
Ineson 42'	Report

Umpires:
Alain Renaud (FRA)
Fritz Seegers (FRG)

== Statistics ==
=== Final standings ===
1. New Zealand
2. Australia
3. Pakistan
4. Netherlands
5. West Germany
6. Spain
7. India
8. Malaysia
9. Belgium
10. Canada
11. Argentina

=== Goalscorers ===
There were 139 goals scored in 37 matches, for an average of 3.76 goals per match.

11 goals

- (Netherlands) Paul Litjens

7 goals

- (Australia) Ronald Riley
- (Spain) Juan Amat
- (West Germany) Wolfgang Strödter

6 goals

- (Pakistan) Munawwaruz Zaman

4 goals

- (Belgium) Serge Dubois
- (India) Surjit Singh Randhawa
- (New Zealand) Tony Ineson
- (Pakistan) Manzoor Hussain

3 goals

- (Australia) David Bell
- (India) Victor Philips
- (India) Ajit Singh
- (New Zealand) Ramesh Patel
- (Pakistan) Abdul Rashid
- (Pakistan) Shahnaz Sheikh
- (West Germany) Michael Peter
- (West Germany) Rainer Seifert

2 goals

- (Argentina) Gustavo Paolucci
- (Australia) Jim Irvine
- (Belgium) Michel Van Tuyckom
- (Belgium) Michel Vanderborght
- (Canada) Fred Hoos
- (India) Aslam Sher Khan
- (India) Ashok Kumar
- (Netherlands) Hans Kruize
- (New Zealand) Arthur Borren
- (Pakistan) Hanif Khan
- (Pakistan) Akhtar Rasool
- (Spain) José Sallés
- (West Germany) Horst Dröse
- (West Germany) Ralf Lauruschkat

1 goal

- (Argentina) Jorge Disera
- (Argentina) Marcelo Garraffo
- (Argentina) Jorge Ruiz
- (Argentina) Jorge Sabbione
- (Australia) Greg Browning
- (Australia) Ric Charlesworth
- (Australia) Ian Cooke
- (Australia) Trevor Smith
- (Australia) Terry Walsh
- (Belgium) Bruno De Clynsen
- (Belgium) Jean-François Gilles
- (Belgium) Guy Miserque
- (Canada) Paul Chohan
- (Canada) Alan Hobkirk
- (Canada) Peter Motzek
- (Canada) Reg Plummer
- (India) Ajit Pal Singh
- (India) Chand Singh
- (India) Mohinder Singh
- (Malaysia) Murugesan Mahendran
- (Malaysia) Ow Soon Kooi
- (Malaysia) Poon Fook Loke
- (Malaysia) Wong Choon Hin
- (Netherlands) Coen Kranenberg
- (New Zealand) Barry Maister
- (Spain) Jaime Arbós
- (Spain) Francisco Fábregas Bosch
- (Spain) Jorge Fábregas
- (West Germany) Heiner Dopp
- (West Germany) Werner Kaessmann
- (West Germany) Michael Krause
- (West Germany) Peter Trump
- (West Germany) Uli Vos

Source: Olympedia

== Medallists ==
Gold	Silver	Bronze
New Zealand; Paul Ackerley; Jeff Archibald; Arthur Borren; Alan Chesney; John Christensen; Greg Dayman; Tony Ineson; Barry Maister; Selwyn Maister; Trevor Manning; Alan McIntyre; Neil McLeod; Arthur Parkin; Mohan Patel; Ramesh Patel; Les Wilson	Australia; David Bell; Greg Browning; Ric Charlesworth; Ian Cooke; Barry Dancer; Douglas Golder; Robert Haigh; Wayne Hammond; Jim Irvine; Malcolm Poole; Robert Proctor; Graeme Reid; Ronald Riley; Trevor Smith; Terry Walsh	Pakistan; Rashid Abdul; Akhtar Rasool; Mahmood Arshad; Arshad Chaudhry; Khan Haneef; Islahuddin Siddique; Samiullah Khan; Manzoor Hussain; Munawwaruz Zaman; Zia Qamar; Nazim Salim; Shahnaz Sheikh; Saleem Sherwani; Iftikar Syed; Mudassar Syed; Manzoor-ul Hassan
