= Vishniac =

Vishniac (Russian: Вишняк) may refer to:

== People ==
- Ethan Vishniac (born 1955), American astrophysicist
- Roman Vishniac (1897–1990), Russian-American photographer and biologist
- Wolf V. Vishniac (1922–1973), American microbiologist who died during an expedition to Antarctica

== Places ==
- Vishniac (crater), a crater on Mars, named after Wolf V. Vishniac
- Vishniac Peak, in Antarctica, named after Wolf V. Vishniac
