= Marcelo Brodsky =

Argentine photographer, visual artist and human rights activist

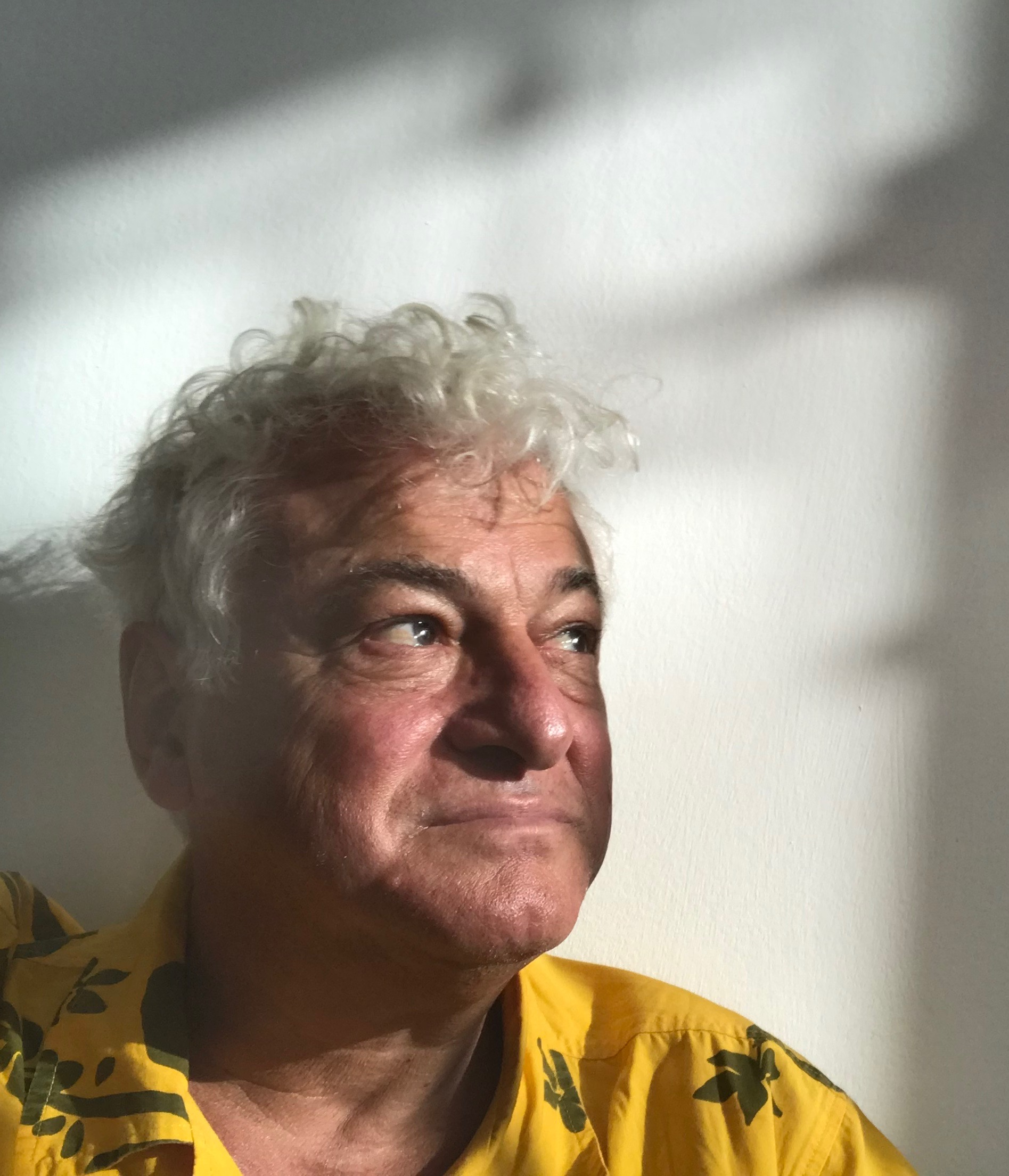
- Marcelo Brodsky
- Born: October 18, 1954 (age 71); Buenos Aires, Argentina
- Occupations: Photographer, visual artist and human rights activist
- Website: www.marcelobrodsky.com

Marcelo Brodsky (born 1954, Buenos Aires, Argentina) is an Argentine photographer, visual artist and human rights activist.

== Early life and career ==
Marcelo Brodsky was born in 1954 in Buenos Aires. He was exiled to Barcelona after the military coup in Argentina in 1976. He studied economics at the University of Barcelona. During his stay in Spain, he took photographs that immortalized the psychological and emotional state generated by exile for political reasons. He returned to Argentina after the end of the military dictatorship in 1984. He began his project Buena Memoria, a visual essay that deals with the experiences and emotions of those who lived through dictatorship and with the consequences of the disappeared by state terror in his generation. Brodsky had many solo and group shows and his work is part of major collections such as the Museum of Fine Arts Houston, the Tate Gallery in London, Museo Nacional de Bellas Artes (Buenos Aires), Buenos Aires Museum of Modern Art, The center for creative Photography in Tucson, University of Arizona, Sprengel Museum in Germany, Pinacoteca do Estado de São Paulo in Brazil, Lima Art Museum in Peru, Colección de Arte del Banco de la República in Colombia and Metropolitan Museum of Art in New York.

Brodsky has represented Argentina in several international biennials including the Biennale d'art contemporain de Lyon(2017-2018), Rencontres d'Arles (2018), Dakar Biennale (2018), São Paulo Art Biennial (2010), Valencia (2007) and International Architecture Biennale Rotterdam (2000).
Brodsky is a member of the human rights organization Asociación Buena Memoria. He is also a member of the Board of Directors of the Remembrance park (Parque de la memoria), a sculpture park and large monument with names and a gallery, built in Buenos Aires to the memory of victims of state terrorism.

In his Traces of Violence series, Brodsky explored the Herero and Nama genocide based on contemporary photographs, and included comparison of the event with the Holocaust. Museum curators in Brazil decided to display it despite concerns over violent content. However, the directors of San Francisco's Contemporary Jewish Museum refused to display the works during a planned exhibition of Brodsky's work, citing belief that it would be interpreted as criticism of Israel's military actions in Gaza.

== Selected exhibitions ==
=== Solo ===
- 2021: Traces of Violence, ARTCO Gallery, Berlin, Germany.
- 2021: Vision and Justice, Frieze New York, Henrique Faria Fine Art NY, USA.
- 2020: A call to vote, Henrique Faria Fine Art, New York, USA.
- 2020: 1968 & Black lives matter, Buenos Aires Photo, Rolf Art, Buenos Aires.
- 2019: 1968, The Fire of Ideas, Thorne Sagendorp Gallery, Keene College, NH, USA
- 2019: 1968, The Fire of Ideas, Investec Cape Town Art Fair, Artco Gallery, Cape Town, South Africa.
- 2019: Abran los puentes, Juntos Aparte, Bienalsur, Cúcuta, Colombia.
- 2018: 1968, The Fire of Ideas, ECCHR, Berlin, Germany.

=== Group ===
- 2020: Pictures Revisited, Metropolitan Museum of Art, New York.
- 2019: Remains of the Amia Jewish Institution, Rolf Art, Buenos Aires
- 2018: 1968, The Fire of Ideas Resist., Centre for Fine Arts, Brussels, Bruselas, Belgium
- 2017: 1968, El Fuego de las ideas, Sublevaciones. MUNTREF, Buenos Aires, Argentina
- 2016: Upheaval (with Jorge Tacla), Aidekman Arts Center, Tufts University, Massachusetts, USA.

== Publications ==
- Poetics of Resistance (2019)
- 1968, The Fire of Ideas (2018)
- Ayotzinapa, Acción Visual (2016)
- Buena Memoria (1996)
- Nexo (2001)
- Memory under construction (2005)
- Visual Correspondences (2009)

== Awards ==
- 2009: Human Rights Award, awarded by B'nai B'rith.
- 2014: Jean Mayer Award, awarded by Tufts University.
