= Contemporary Jewish Museum =

The Contemporary Jewish Museum
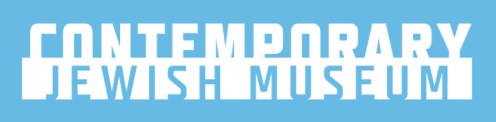

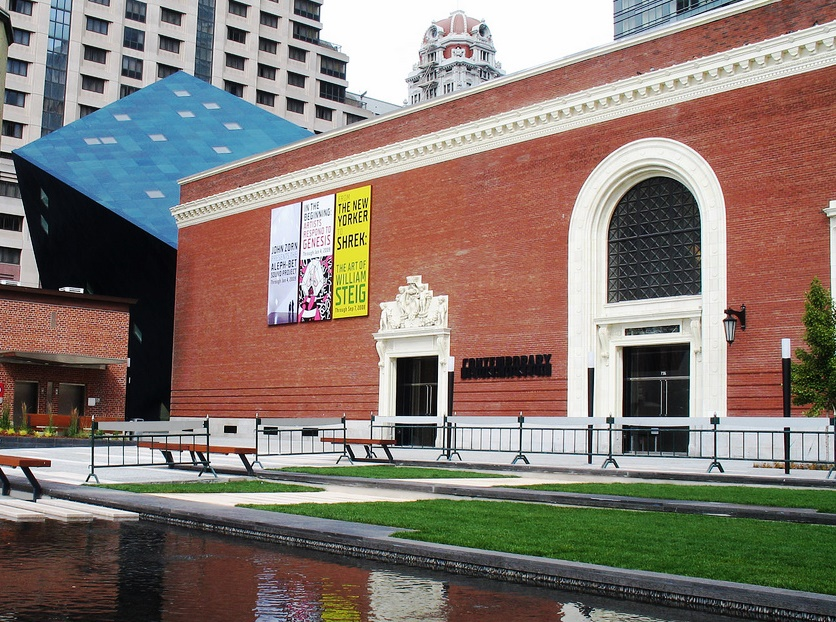
- The former Jessie Street Substation (right) and the 2008 addition (left) designed by Daniel Libeskind
- Established: 1984 (On hiatus December 15, 2024)
- Location: 736 Mission Street, San Francisco, California, United States
- Coordinates: 37.78577°N 122.40394°W
- Type: Art Museum
- Director: Kerry King
- Public transit access: Powell Street Station
- Website: thecjm.org

The Contemporary Jewish Museum (CJM) is a non-collecting museum at 736 Mission Street at Yerba Buena Lane in the South of Market (SoMa) neighborhood of San Francisco, California. The museum, which was founded in 1984, is located in the historic Jessie Street Substation, which was gutted and its interior redesigned by Daniel Libeskind, along with a new addition; the new museum opened in 2008. The museum's mission is to make the diversity of the Jewish experience relevant for a 21st- century audience through exhibitions and educational programs. The executive director is Kerry King.

The museum closed in December 2024 due to financial problems, and in 2026 announced that it would sell its building to provide funds.

== History ==
The Contemporary Jewish Museum was founded in 1984 and was housed for over two decades in a small gallery space at the Jewish Community Federation of San Francisco near San Francisco's waterfront. In 1989, the museum initiated a planning process to address the growing community need for its programs. The result was the decision to create a more expansive and centrally located facility with increased exhibitions, an area dedicated to education, and added program areas including live music, theater, dance, literary events, and film. In June 2008, the CJM opened a new 63,000 square-foot facility in downtown San Francisco.

During the 2000s, negotiations were held to potentially merge the CJM with the Judah L. Magnes Museum in Berkeley (now the Magnes Collection of Jewish Art and Life). However, the talks failed to produce an agreement to combine the two institutions.

In late 2024 the museum announced that it would suspend operations for at least a year due to ongoing financial struggles, shutting its doors at end of day on December 15, and would reduce its staff. Kerry King, the museum's executive director, stressed that the closure is not intended to be permanent and the building would remain available to host events. In March 2026, the museum announced that to ensure its continuation, it would sell its building. The announcement also mentioned that the museum would be "hiring for a curatorial position, collaborating on exhibitions and programming with other institutions, and planning for forums at which audience and supporters can provide feedback on the museum's future".

== Exhibitions ==
The CJM is not a history museum, and does not have a permanent collection. It has curated and hosted a broad array of exhibitions each year in collaboration with other institutions, with the intent of making "the diversity of the Jewish experience relevant for a 21st-century audience."

The museum did have one commissioned object on permanent display, the 90-foot long, 12,000-pound Lamp of the Covenant by Sacramento artist David Lane, a massive, arc-shaped sculpture made of recycled steel, numerous globes of the world, animal figurines, Jewish letters, and Edison bulbs, suspended above the museum's lobby. Lane, who calls himself an outsider artist and is not Jewish, says the work is meant to evoke time, space and the dialogue between man and God.

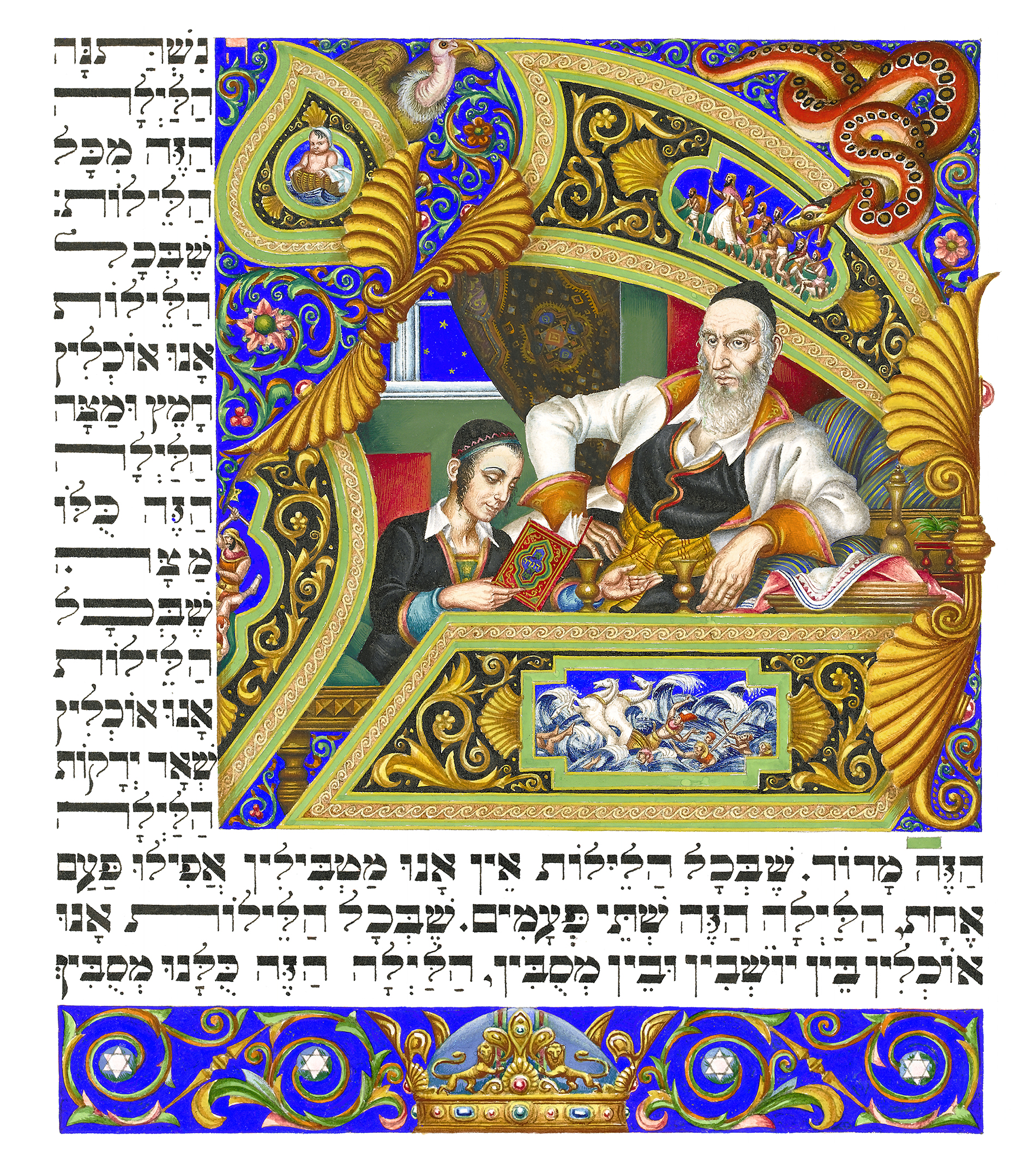
Arthur Szyk, The Haggadah: The Four Questions (1935), exhibited at the CJM in 2014

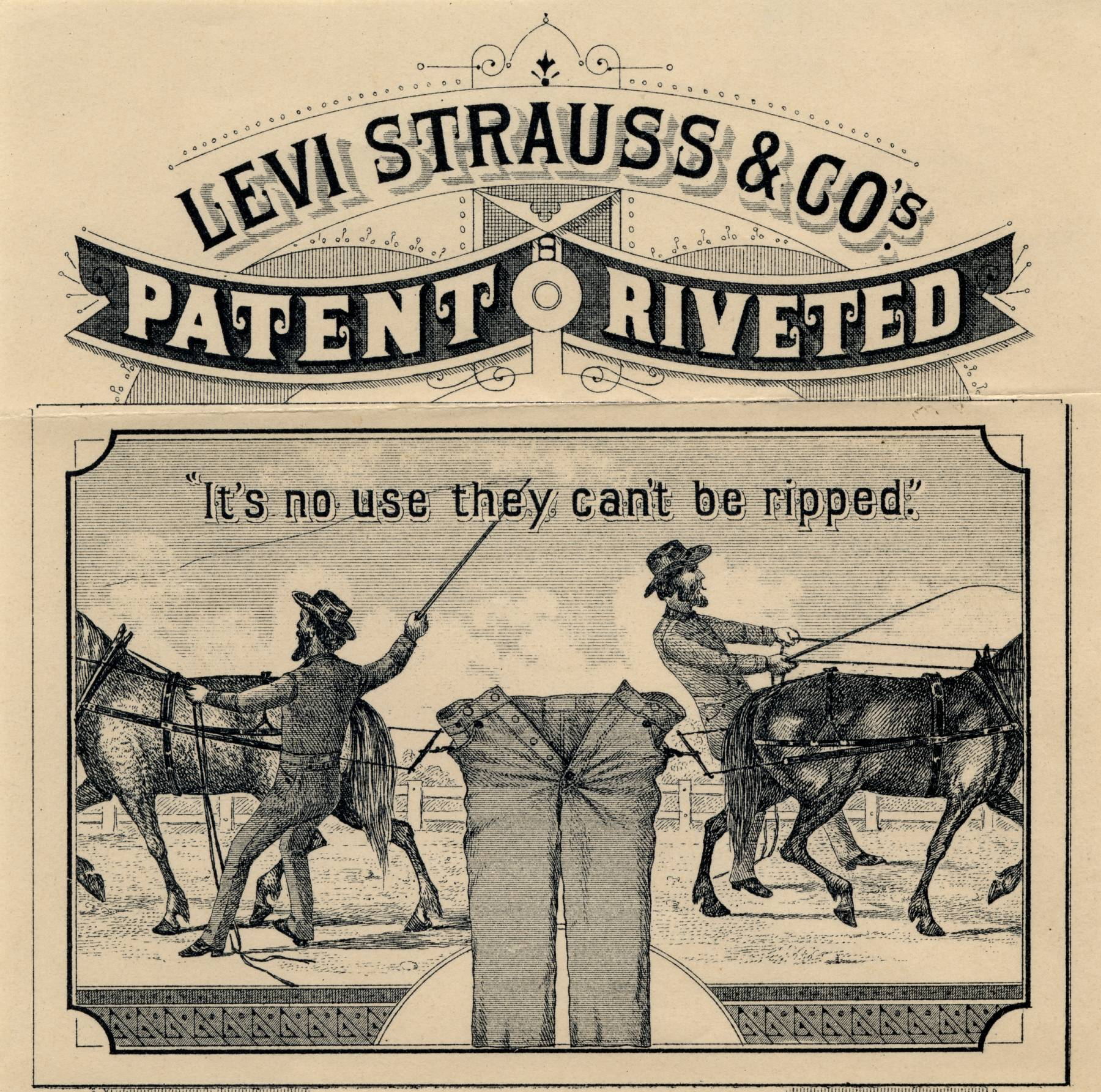
Vintage advertisement from Levi Strauss: A History of American Style at the CJM in 2021

Exhibitions have explored the history and reception of Jewish texts, holidays, and culture; the place of Jews and Jewish artists in San Francisco and California; and the impact of Jewish artists, writers, photographers, filmmakers, designers, musicians, performers, and entrepreneurs on the broader culture.

Past exhibitions have included:

- From The New Yorker to Shrek: The Art of William Steig, 2009
- Chagall and the Artists of the Russian Jewish Theater, 1919–1949, 2009
- Seeing Gertrude Stein: Five Stories, 2011
- There's a Mystery There: Sendak on Sendak, 2011
- Black Sabbath: The Secret Musical History of Black-Jewish Relations, 2011
- Houdini: Art and Magic, 2012
- Kehinde Wiley, The World Stage: Israel, 2013
- Beat Memories: The Photographs of Allen Ginsberg, 2013
- Arthur Szyk and the Art of the Haggadah, 2014
- Project Mah Jongg, 2014
- Arnold Newman: Masterclass, 2015
- Amy Winehouse: A Family Portrait, 2015
- Roman Vishniac Rediscovered, 2016
- Bill Graham and the Rock & Roll Revolution, 2016
- Stanley Kubrick: The Exhibition, 2016
- Cary Leibowitz: Museum Show, 2017
- Roz Chast: Cartoon Memoirs, 2017
- The Art of Rube Goldberg, 2018
- Lew the Jew and His Circle: Origins of American Tattoo, 2019
- Levi Strauss: A History of American Style, 2021
- Experience Leonard Cohen, 2022
- The Jim Henson Exhibition: Imagination Unlimited, 2022

In his Traces of Violence series, Argentine–Jewish artist Marcelo Brodsky explored the Herero and Nama genocide based on contemporary photographs, and included comparison of the event with the Holocaust. Museum curators in Brazil decided to display it despite concerns over violent content. However, the directors of San Francisco's Contemporary Jewish Museum refused to display the works during a planned exhibition of Brodsky's work, citing belief that it would be interpreted as criticism of Israel's military actions in Gaza.

== Programs and events ==
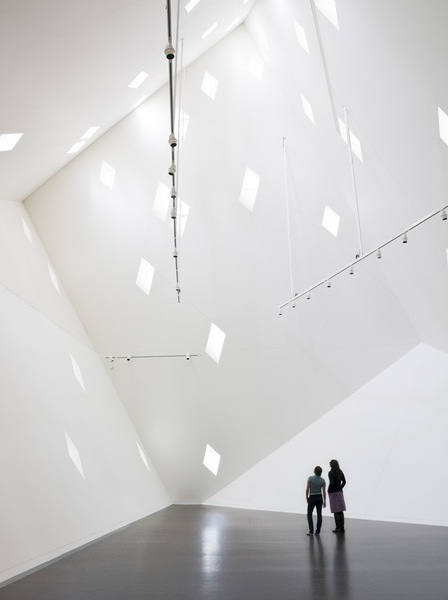
Interior view of the "Yud"

The museum's education programs include public tours, classes and workshops, film screenings, lectures and gallery talks, performances, teacher training, school visits, family tours and art making, and a teen internship program.

The Helen Diller Institute at the CJM is a collaborative work space where distinguished visiting scholars and project teams of CJM staff work together to create dynamic Jewish content and programs for the museum's diverse audiences. Its centerpiece is a Beit Midrash ("study hall" in Hebrew) for ongoing trainings that enhance exhibitions and programs in development.

== Architecture ==
- Jessie Street Substation
- U.S. National Register of Historic Places
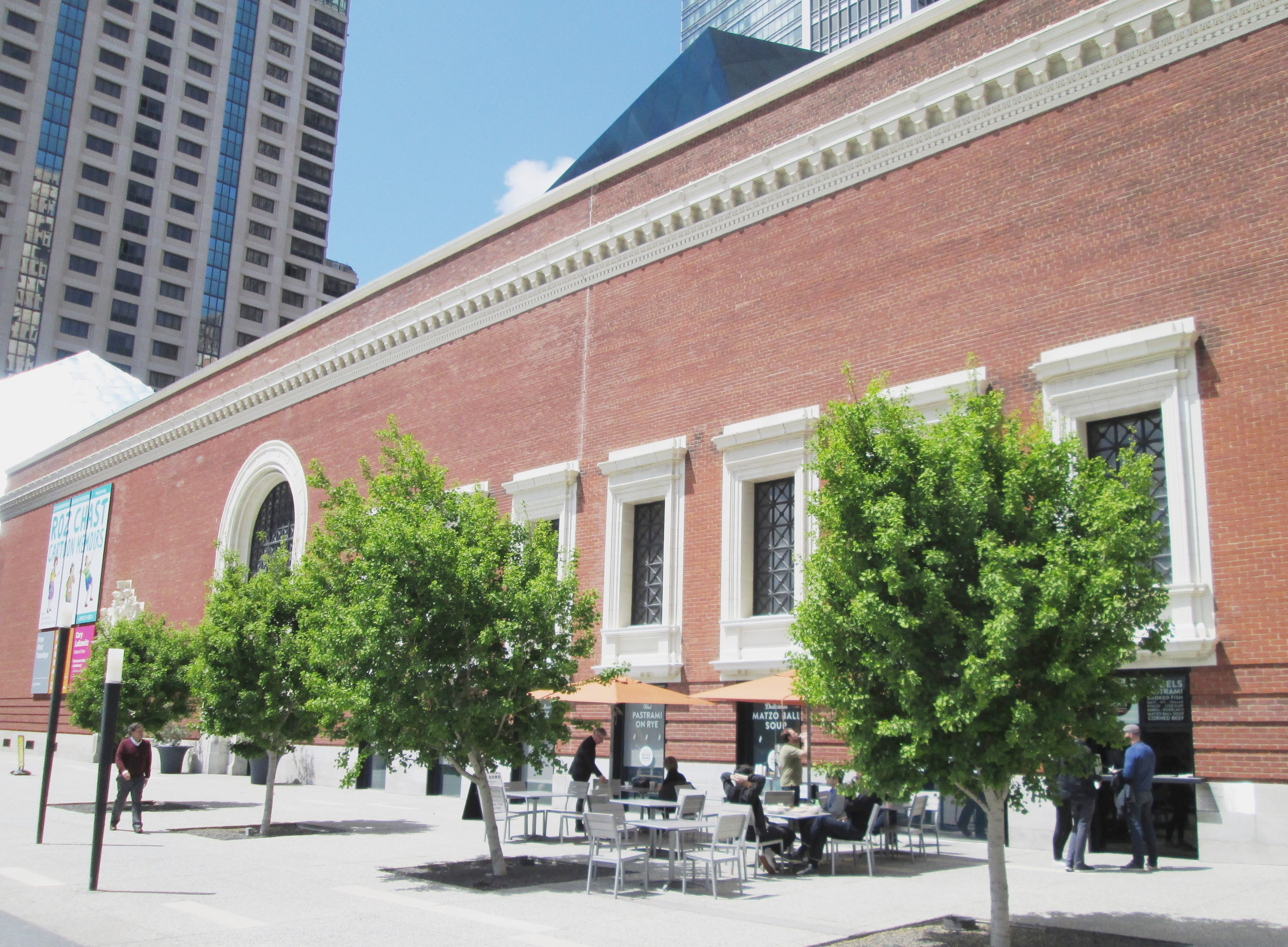

- Location within San Francisco Bay Area Location within California
- Location: 222-226 Jessie St., San Francisco, California
- Coordinates: 37°47′10″N 122°24′10″W
- Area: 0.4 acres (0.16 ha)
- Built: 1905
- Architects: Polk,Willis
- Architectural style: Classical Revival
- NRHP reference No.: 74000555
- Added to NRHP: September 6, 1974

The museum's main building is the former Pacific Gas & Electric Jessie Street Substation, which was originally built in 1881 and was rebuilt in 1907 by Willis Polk after the 1906 San Francisco earthquake. The building was listed on the National Register of Historic Places on September 6, 1974.

Daniel Libeskind designed the new 63,000 square foot (5,900 square meter) interior of the substation, plus a new deconstructivist cubical addition which extends it. The new museum was completed in 2008 at a cost of $47.5 million.

The building's tilted, dark-blue stainless steel cube, constructed by A. Zahner Company, slices into the old substation's brick, making visible the relationship between the new and the old. Libeskind's design preserves the defining features of Polk's old building, including its brick façade, trusses, and skylights. 36 diamond-shaped windows light the top floor of the metal cube, known as the "Yud", which hosts sound and performance based exhibitions. The museum's other section, a slanting rectangle known as the "Chet", holds the narrow lobby, an education center, and part of an upstairs gallery.

The deconstructivist addition by Daniel Libeskind (2017)

Similar to Libeskind's Danish Jewish Museum in Copenhagen, the Contemporary Jewish Museum incorporates text into its design. Inspired by the phrase "L'chaim", meaning "To Life", Libeskind let the Hebrew letters that spell "chai" —"chet" and "yud", inspire the form of the building. Libeskind himself explains how he used the letters: "The chet provides an overall continuity for the exhibition and educational spaces, and the yud with its 36 windows, serves as special exhibition, performance and event space." "To Life", also a traditional Jewish drinking toast, refers both "to the role the substation played in restoring energy to the city after the 1906 earthquake and the Museum's mission to be a lively center for engaging audiences with Jewish culture". The Hebrew word pardes, meaning "orchard", is embedded in the wall of the lobby.

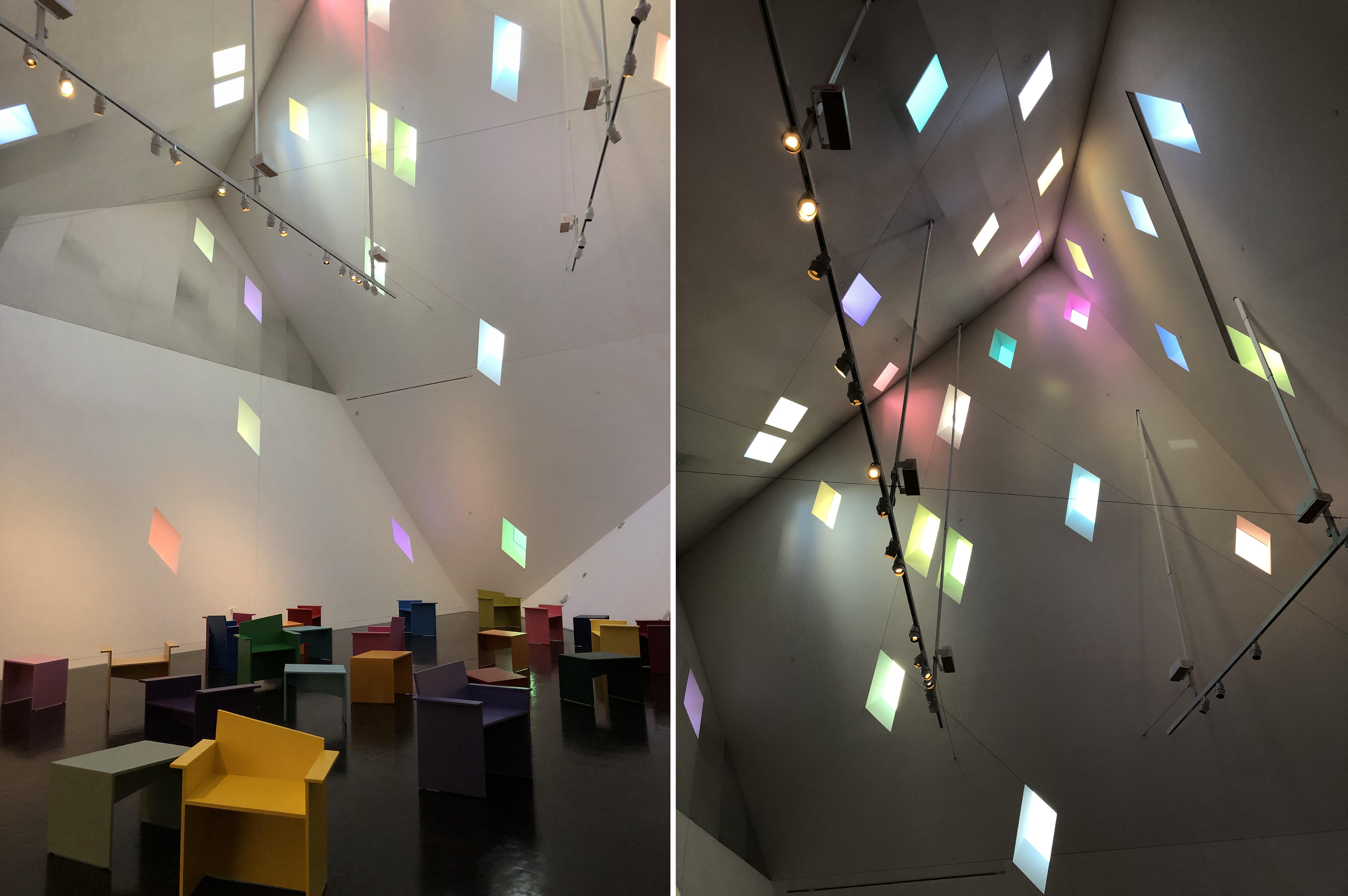
Interior of the "Yud" with windows tinted in various colors for the 2024 exhibition/installation When One Sees a Rainbow by Leah Rosenberg. Photos by Steven Saylor.

=== Reception ===
Critic Christopher Hawthorne of the Los Angeles Times praised Libeskind for a "careful balance of explosive and well-behaved forms" and gallery designs that abandon the architect's characteristic slanted walls. Likewise, David D'Arcy of The Wall Street Journal saw the museum as a laudable departure from Libeskind's previous work, finding a "lightness to this [museum] that is rare in the architect's work" and that "relieves the surrounding district's glass and steel tourist-mall monotony."

=== Gallery ===
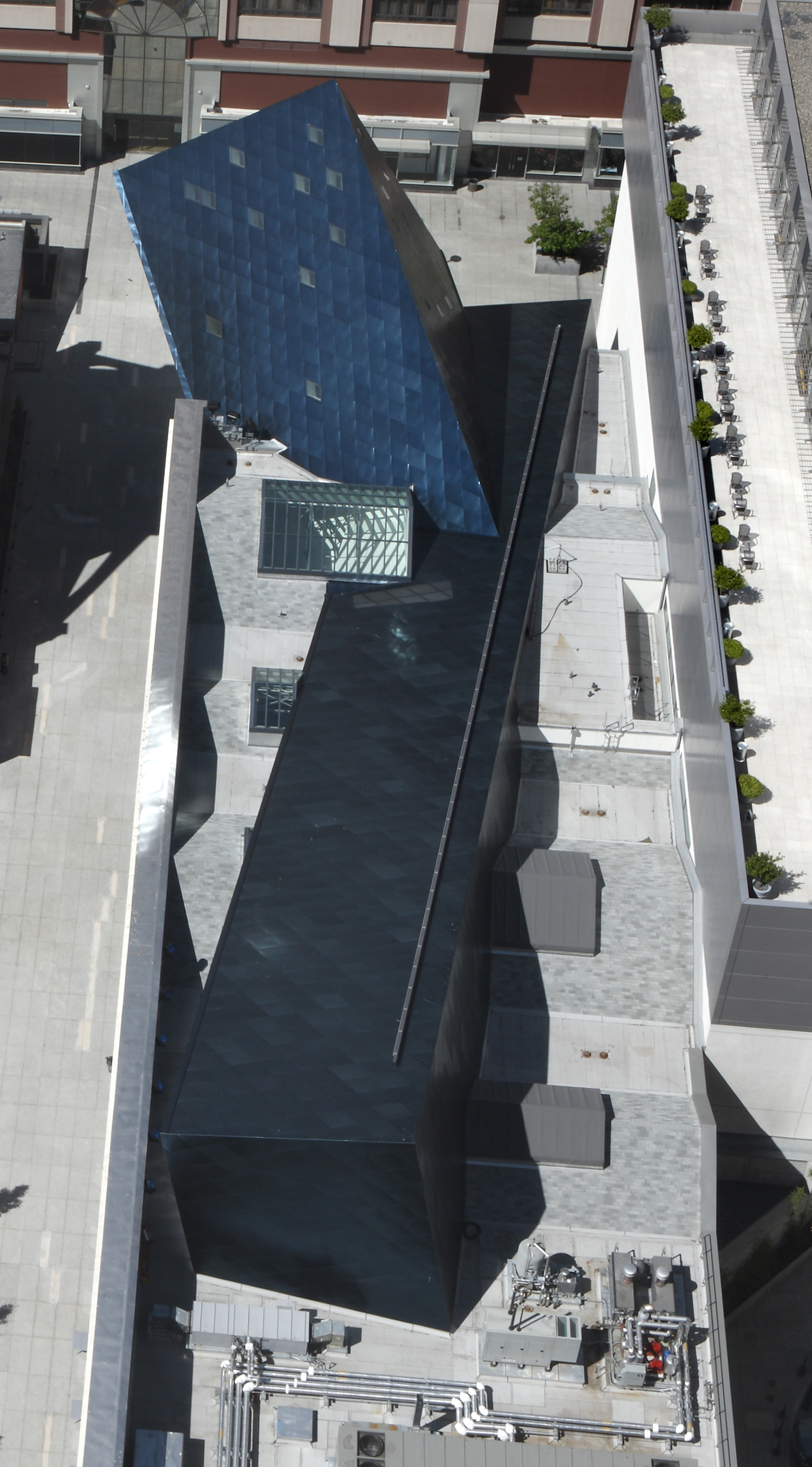

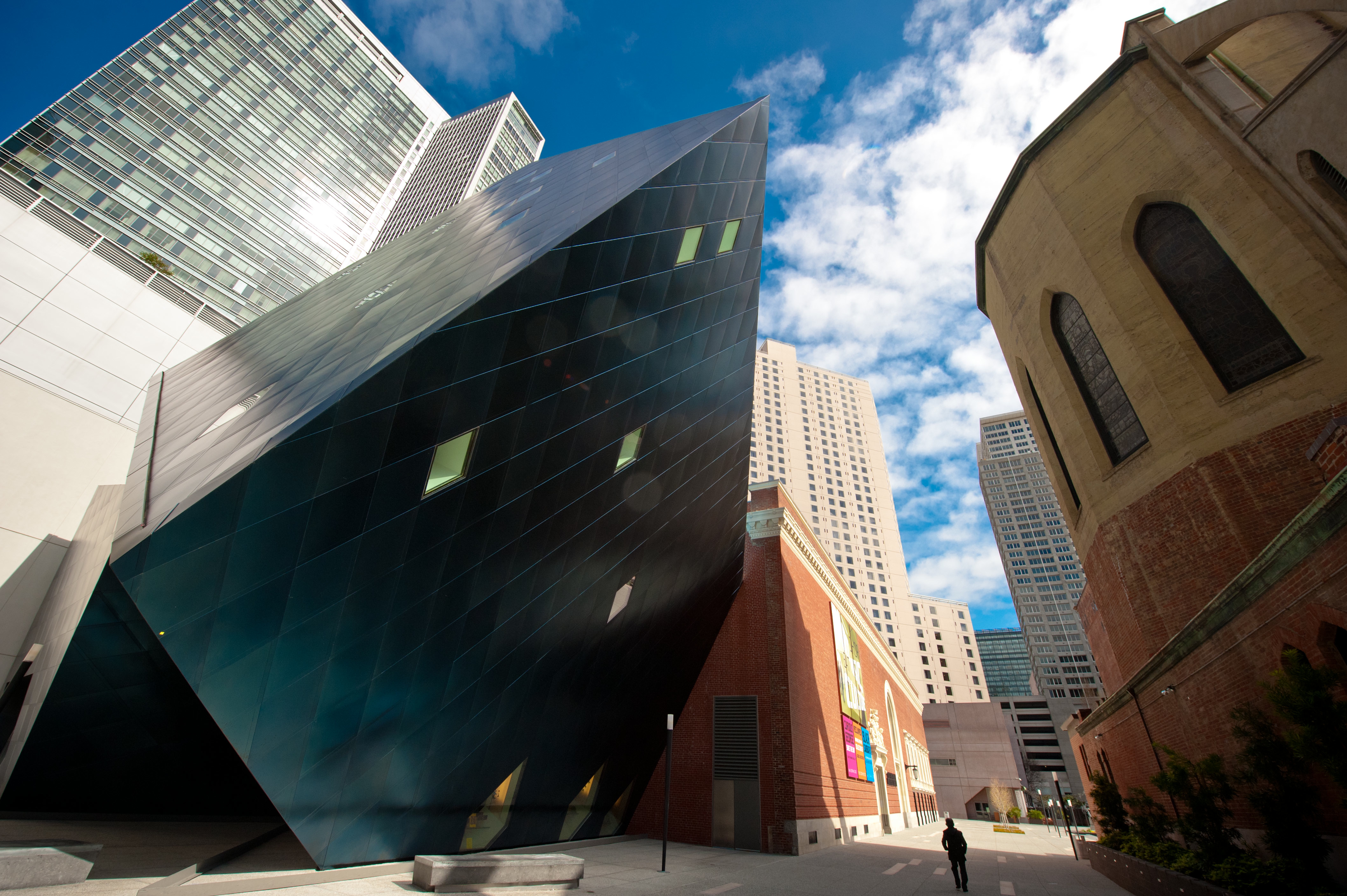

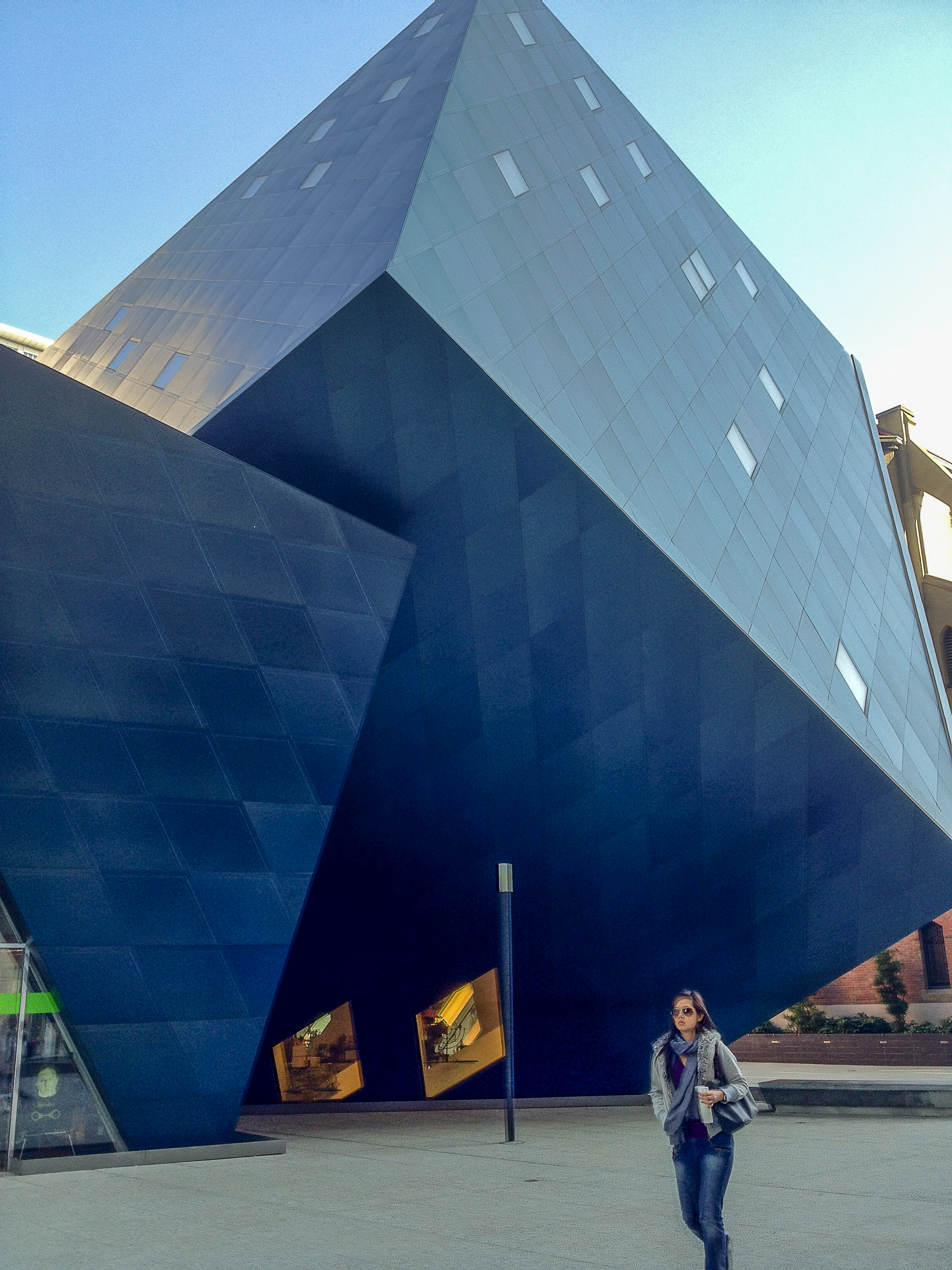

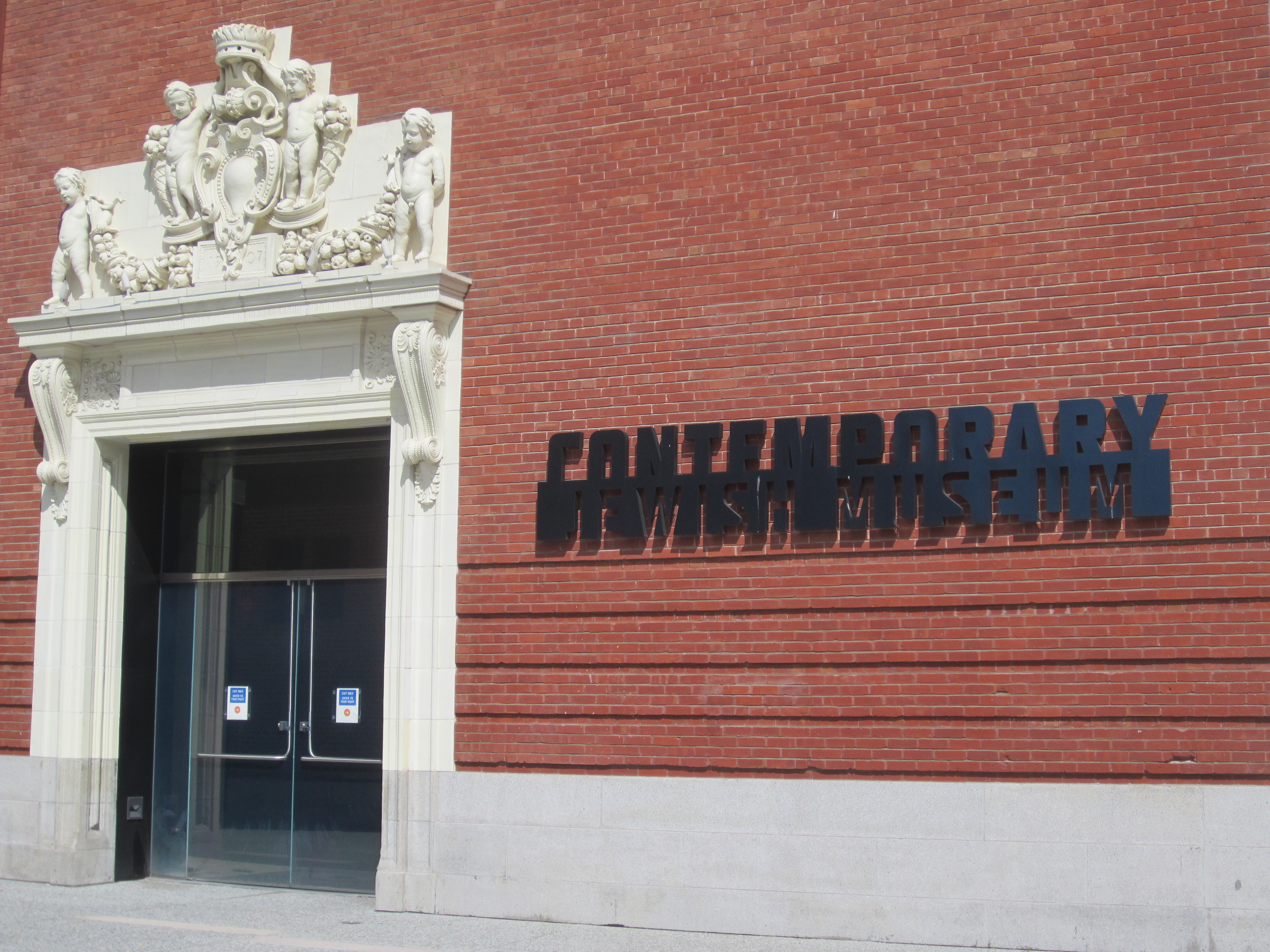

== Management ==
Kerry King currently serves as the museum's Executive Director. Previous directors include Constance Wolf (1999–2012), Lori Starr (2013–2020) and Chad Coerver (2021–2023). In 2018, the museum hired Heidi Rabben as Senior Curator, succeeding Renny Pritikin (2014–2018).

== See also ==
- Magnes Collection of Jewish Art and Life in Berkeley, California
- The Jewish Museum, New York, NY
- Jewish Museum Berlin
