= Ineson =

Ineson is an English surname. Notable people with the surname include:

- Chris Ineson (born 1945), New Zealand field hockey player
- Emma Ineson (born 1969), British Anglican priest and academic
- Phil Ineson, British academic
- Ralph Ineson (born 1969), English actor
- Tony Ineson (born 1950), New Zealand field hockey player

== See also ==
- Ineson Glacier, a glacier of James Ross Island, Antarctica
