= Ilene Busch-Vishniac =

American mechanical engineer and academic administrator

9th President of the University of Saskatchewan
- In office July 1, 2012 – May 21, 2014
- Preceded by: Peter MacKinnon
- Succeeded by: Peter Stoicheff

Personal details
- Born: Philadelphia, Pennsylvania, U.S.
- Spouse: Ethan Vishniac
- Relatives: Wolf V. Vishniac (father-in-law); Roman Vishniac (grandfather-in-law)
- Education: University of Rochester; MIT
- Profession: engineer
- Scientific career
- Fields: Acoustic engineering
- Workplaces: University of Texas at Austin; Johns Hopkins University; McMaster University; University of Saskatchewan
- Thesis: Sound generation from impacted paper (1981)

Ilene Busch-Vishniac is an American-born mechanical engineer and university administrator who served as president of the University of Saskatchewan from 2012 to 2014. She was previously dean of the Whiting School of Engineering at Johns Hopkins University from 1998 to 2003 and president of the Acoustical Society of America (ASA) from 2003 to 2005.

== Education ==
Busch-Vishniac received her bachelor's degree in physics and mathematics (magna cum laude) from the University of Rochester in 1976. She then received her master's degree in 1978 and her PhD in 1981, both in mechanical engineering from the Massachusetts Institute of Technology.

== Career ==
Busch-Vishniac was a pianist before studying acoustics. She served as Dean of the Whiting School of Engineering at Johns Hopkins University from 1998 to 2003 then resigned the position to serve as President of the Acoustical Society of America (ASA), an elected non-gratis position, from 2003 to 2005. She served as Provost and vice-president for Academic Affairs at McMaster University from 2007 to 2012.

=== University of Saskatchewan ===
In December 2011, Busch-Vishniac was selected as the ninth President of the University of Saskatchewan, replacing Peter MacKinnon with effect from July 2012. On May 21, 2014, she was "terminated without cause" from her position amid national criticism surrounding the Provost's decision, Brett Fairbairn, to dismiss and end the tenure of an executive director who had openly criticized the university's leadership while Busch-Vishniac was away. Busch-Vishniac criticized the decision the next day, and invited the former executive director to return as a professor. In June, 2015, Busch-Vishniac filed a lawsuit over her firing seeking $8.5 million in damages, naming Saskatchewan Premier, Brad Wall, former Minister of Advanced Education, Rob Norris, as well as the university and Board of Governors and alleging that both the Premier and former Minister unlawfully influenced the Board's decision in her firing. The university is also accused of violating its bylaws when it terminated her contract. In 2019, after an attempt to dismiss the lawsuit, the university settled out of court with Busch-Vishniac.

=== Later career ===
In 2018 she joined startup Sonavi Labs as Chief Innovation Officer. She has written research papers for the ASME on matters related to tribology.

In 2024 a book she cowrote was published by Springer Nature, titled Women in the National Inventors Hall of Fame: The First 50 Years; the other authors were Lauren Busch and Jill Tietjen.

== Awards and honors ==
Busch-Vishniac received the ASA Silver Medal in Engineering Acoustics in 2001 for her work in developing novel electret microphones and of precision micro-electro-mechanical sensors and positioners. She was elected a Fellow of the Acoustical Society of America (ASA) in 1987, and also received the ASA R. Bruce Lindsay Award.

Academic offices
Preceded by Peter MacKinnon	President of the University of Saskatchewan; 2012-2014	Succeeded by Gordon Barnhart (interim)
