= Peter Stoicheff =

Canadian academic (born 1956)

10th President of the University of Saskatchewan
- Incumbent
- Assumed office October 24, 2015
- Chancellor: Grit McCreath
- Preceded by: Gordon Barnhart (acting)

Personal details
- Born: Richard Peter Stoicheff; 1956 (age 69–70) Ottawa, Ontario, Canada
- Relatives: Boris P. Stoicheff (father)
- Education: Queen's University (BA); University of Toronto (MA, PhD)

Academic background
- Thesis: Ezra Pound's Drafts and Fragments: A Study in Composition (1983)

Academic work
- Discipline: English literature
- Sub-discipline: 20th-century American literature
- Institutions: University of Saskatchewan

Richard Peter Stoicheff (born 1956) is a Canadian academic. He is the 10th and previous president of the University of Saskatchewan, succeeded by Vince Bruni-Bossio. Stoicheff succeeded Ilene Busch-Vishniac, following an interim appointment of Gordon Barnhart.

Born in Ottawa, Ontario, the son of the physicist Boris P. Stoicheff, Stoicheff received an undergraduate degree in English and history from Queen's University in 1978 and a master's of arts in 1980 and PhD in 1983 in English literature from the University of Toronto. He joined the University of Saskatchewan's English department in 1986. From 2005 to 2010, he was vice-dean humanities and fine arts in the College of Arts and Science. In 2011, he was appointed dean.

Academic offices
Preceded by Gordon Barnhart (acting)	10th President of the University of Saskatchewan; 2015-present	Incumbent
