= Roman Vishniac =

Russian-American photographer (1897–1990)

- Роман Вишняк
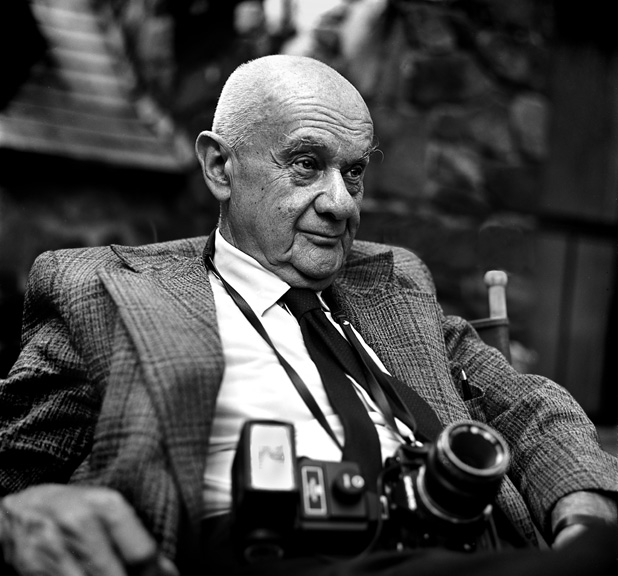
- Vishniac in 1977
- Born: August 19, 1897; Pavlovsk, Russian Empire
- Died: January 22, 1990 (aged 92); New York City, United States
- Occupations: Photographer, biologist
- Spouses: Luta (Leah) Bagg (m. 1918; div. 1946) Edith Ernst (m. 1947)
- Children: 2, including Wolf V.
- Relatives: Ethan Vishniac (grandson); Ilene Busch-Vishniac (granddaughter-in-law)

Roman Vishniac (/ˈvɪʃniæk/; Russian: Роман Соломонович Вишняк, romanized: Roman Solomonovich Visnyak; August 19, 1897 – January 22, 1990) was a Russian-American photographer, best known for capturing on film the culture of Jews in Central and Eastern Europe before the Holocaust. A major archive of his work was housed at the International Center of Photography until 2018, when Vishniac's daughter, Mara Vishniac Kohn, donated it to The Magnes Collection of Jewish Art and Life at the University of California, Berkeley.

Vishniac was a versatile photographer, an accomplished biologist, an art collector and teacher of art history. He also made significant scientific contributions to photomicroscopy and time-lapse photography. Vishniac was very interested in history, especially that of his ancestors, and strongly attached to his Jewish roots; he was a Zionist later in life.

Roman Vishniac won international acclaim for his photos of shtetlach and Jewish ghettos, celebrity portraits, and microscopic biology. His book A Vanished World, published in 1983, made him famous and is one of the most detailed pictorial documentations of Jewish culture in Eastern Europe in the 1930s. Vishniac was also remembered for his humanism and respect for life, sentiments that can be seen in all aspects of his work.

In 2013, Vishniac's daughter Mara (Vishniac) Kohn donated to the International Center of Photography the images and accompanying documents comprising ICP's "Roman Vishniac Rediscovered" traveling exhibition.

In October 2018, Kohn donated the Vishniac archive of an estimated 30,000 items, including photo negatives, prints, documents and other memorabilia that had been housed at ICP to The Magnes Collection of Jewish Art and Life, a unit of the University of California at Berkeley's library system.

== Biography ==
=== Early life ===
Vishniac was born in his grandparents' dacha outside Saint Petersburg, in the town of Pavlovsk, and grew up in Moscow. To live in this city was a right granted to few Jews but the Vishniac family lived there because Solomon Vishniac, Roman's father, was a wealthy manufacturer of umbrellas, and his mother, Manya, was the daughter of affluent diamond dealers. Vishniac also had a sister, Katja. During the summer months, the Vishniac family left Moscow, as it became uncomfortably hot, and they retreated to a dacha a few miles outside the city.

As a child, Vishniac was fascinated by biology and photography, and his room was filled with "plants, insects, fish and small animals". On his seventh birthday, he got a microscope from his grandmother, to which he promptly hooked up a camera, and by which he photographed the muscles in a cockroach's leg at 150 times magnification. Young Vishniac used this microscope extensively, viewing and photographing everything he could find, from dead insects to animal scales, to pollen and protozoa.

Until the age of ten, Vishniac was homeschooled; from ten to seventeen, he attended a private school at which he earned a gold medal for scholarship. Beginning in 1914, he spent six years at the Shanyavsky Moscow City People's University (now Russian State University for the Humanities) in Moscow. At the institute he studied zoology. As a graduate student, he worked with prestigious biologist Nikolai Koltzoff, experimenting with inducing metamorphosis in axolotl, a species of aquatic salamander. While his experiments were a success, Vishniac was not able to publish a paper detailing his findings due to the chaos in Russia and his results were eventually independently duplicated. In spite of this, he went on to take a three-year course in medicine.

Recalcitrance, Berlin, 1926 by Roman Vishniac

=== Berlin ===
In 1918, Vishniac's immediate family moved to Berlin because of anti-Semitism spurred by uprisings against the Bolsheviks. Roman followed them and, shortly after arriving, married Luta (Leah) Bagg, who gave birth to two children, Mara and Wolf. In his free time, he studied Far Eastern Art at the University of Berlin. Vishniac researched endocrinology and optics, and did some photography (see right). In Berlin he often gave lectures on naturalism.

In 1935, as anti-Semitism was growing in Germany, Vishniac was commissioned by the American Jewish Joint Distribution Committee (JDC) in Central Europe to photograph Jewish communities in Eastern Europe as part of a fund-raising drive to help support these poor communities. Vishniac developed and printed these pictures in his darkroom in his Berlin apartment. Further trips to Eastern Europe were undertaken between 1935 and 1938, again at the behest of the JDC. Vishniac used both a Leica and a Rolleiflex camera in his photography. In 1939, his wife and children moved to Sweden to stay with Luta's parents, away from hostile Germany. He met his parents in Nice that summer.

Vishniac traveled to Paris in late summer 1940, and was arrested by Marshal Pétain's police and interned at Camp du Ruchard, a deportation camp in Indre-et-Loire. This occurred because Latvia, of which he was a citizen, had been subsumed into the Soviet Union and Vishniac was considered a "stateless person". After three months, as a result of his wife's efforts and aid from the JDC, he obtained a visa that allowed him to escape via Lisbon to the U.S. with his family. His father stayed behind and spent the war hidden in France; his mother died from cancer in 1941 while still in Nice.

=== New York ===
1942 portrait of Albert Einstein by Roman Vishniac. This is one of the best-known examples of his 1940s portraiture work. Taken in Princeton, NJ.

The Vishniac family fled from Lisbon to New York City in 1940, arriving on New Year's Eve. Vishniac tried to get a job but failed: "For me, it was a time of distraction and fear." He was multilingual, speaking at least German, Russian and Yiddish, but he could not yet speak any English and thus had a difficult time. He managed to do some portraiture work with mostly foreign clients; but business was poor. It was during this time, in 1942, that he took one of his most celebrated portraits, that of Albert Einstein. He arrived at Einstein's home in Princeton, New Jersey, getting into the scientist's study with the ruse of bringing regards from mutual friends in Europe, and photographed him while the scientist was not paying attention to him, occupied in thought. Einstein later called this portrait his favourite.

In 1946, Vishniac divorced Luta, and the next year he married Edith Ernst, an old family friend. A few years later, he gave up portraiture and went on to do freelance work in the field of photomicroscopy.

Once in the United States, Vishniac tried desperately to earn sympathy for impoverished Jews in Eastern Europe. When his work was exhibited at Teachers College, Columbia University in 1943, he wrote to Eleanor Roosevelt (First Lady at the time), asking her to visit the exhibit, but she did not. He also sent some of his photographs to the President, for which he was politely thanked.

Of the 16,000 photographs taken in Eastern Europe by Vishniac, only 2,000 reached America. Most of these negatives were carefully hidden by Vishniac and his family; others were smuggled in by Vishniac's good friend Walter Bierer through Cuba. In the photographer's own words,

I sewed some of the negatives into my clothing when I came to the United States in 1940. Most of them were left with my father in Clermont-Ferrand, a small city in central France. He survived there, hidden. He concealed the negatives under floorboards and behind picture frames.

=== Later life ===
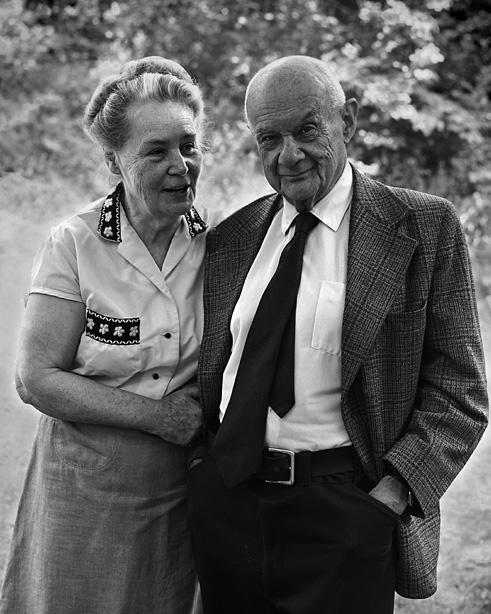
Roman and Edith Vishniac, 1977

Even when he grew older, Vishniac was very active. In 1957, he was appointed research associate at the Albert Einstein College of Medicine and in 1961 was promoted to "professor of biological education". In his seventies and eighties, Vishniac became "Chevron Professor of Creativity" at Pratt Institute (where he taught courses on topics such as the philosophy of photography). During this time he lived on the Upper West Side of Manhattan with his wife Edith, teaching, photographing, reading and collecting artifacts. Items in his collection included a 14th-century Buddha, Chinese tapestries, Japanese swords, various antique microscopes, valued old maps and venerable books. He taught Oriental and Russian art, general philosophy and religion in science, specifically Jewish topics, ecology, numismatics, photography and general science at City University of New York, Case Western Reserve University and at various other institutions.

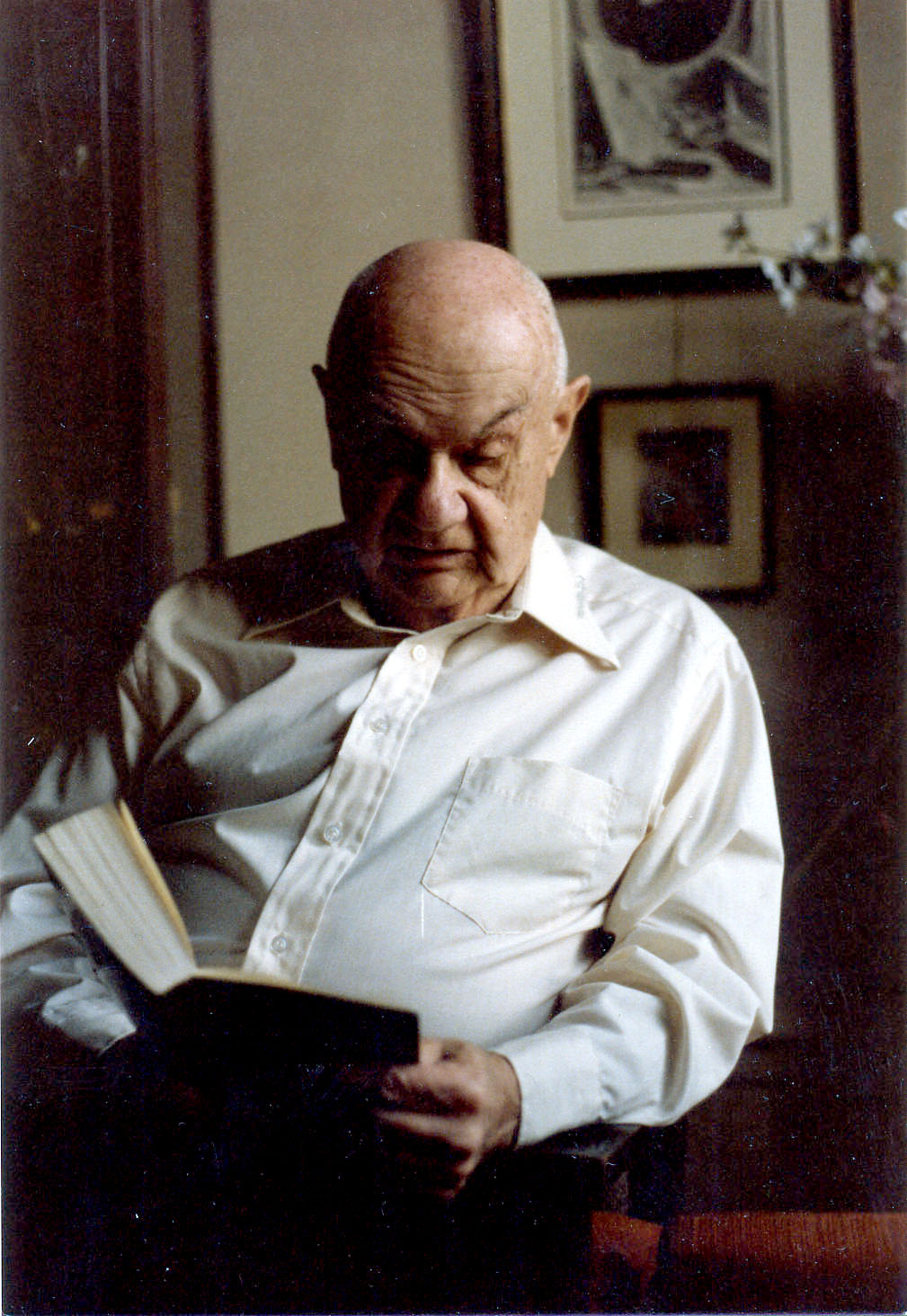
Vishniac, c. 1981 by Daniel J. Krellenstein

During his life, Vishniac was the subject and creator of many films and documentaries; the most celebrated of which was the Living Biology series. This consisted of seven films on cell biology; organs and systems; embryology; evolution; genetics; ecology; botany; the animal world; and the microbial world. It was funded by a grant from the National Science Foundation.

Vishniac received Honorary Doctoral degrees from the Rhode Island School of Design, Columbia College of Art and the California College of Art, before his death from colon cancer on January 22, 1990.

== Photography ==
Entrance to the Ghetto, Kraków, Poland, 1937 by Roman Vishniac. Gelatin silver print. This photograph is often associated with Vishniac's work in Central Europe.

=== In Central and Eastern Europe ===
==== 1935–1939 ====
Vishniac is best known for his dramatic photographs of poor and pious Jews in cities and shtetlach of Eastern Europe. He was commissioned to take these pictures by the American Jewish Joint Distribution Committee (JDC) as part of a fundraising initiative, but Vishniac had a personal interest in this subject matter. He traveled back and forth from Berlin to the ghettos of Poland, Romania, Czechoslovakia and Lithuania between 1935 and 1938 as well as working for the JDC.

While touring Europe, Vishniac posed as a traveling fabric salesman, seeking aid where he could and bribing anyone who got in his way. During his touring of Eastern Europe (1935–1939), he was often arrested by police for taking these pictures, sometimes because he was thought to be spying. Later, when published, these photographs made him popular enough for his work to be showcased as one-man shows at Columbia University, the Jewish Museum in New York, the International Center of Photography and other such institutions.

Vishniac claimed that he had taken 16,000 photos in this period, every one a candid shot, but the veracity of these claims has been challenged by research by Maya Benton, a curator at the International Center of Photography. To photograph small villages in these mountains, Vishniac claimed he carried heavy equipment (Leica, Rolleiflex, movie camera, tripods), 115 pounds (52 kilograms) by his estimate, on his back, up steep roads, trekking many miles. Vishniac captured thousands of impoverished Jews on film, "... to preserve — in pictures, at least — a world that might soon cease to exist".

When using a Leica for indoor shots, Vishniac sometimes brought a kerosene lamp (visible in some of his work) if there was insufficient light, keeping his back to a wall for support, and holding his breath. The Rolleiflex was used mostly for outdoor scenes.

Roman Vishniac did not just want to preserve the memories of the Jews; he actively fought to increase awareness in the West of the worsening situation in Eastern Europe. "Through his photographs, he sought to alert the rest of the world to the horrors [of the Nazi persecution]", Mitgang. In late 1938, for example, he sneaked into Zbaszyn, an internment camp in Germany near the border, where Jews awaited deportation to Poland. After photographing the "filthy barracks", as he described it, for two days, he escaped by jumping from the second floor at night and creeping away, avoiding broken glass and barbed wire. These photos were sent to the League of Nations in Geneva to prove the existence of such camps.

After Vishniac's death, many photos came to light depicting life in Berlin taken between 1920 and 1939. Some of these negatives were found at the end of rolls of film devoted to scientific work. An exhibition of Vishniac's Berlin photos was mounted at the Jewish Museum, Berlin in 2005, and a book of the photos was published.

==== Style ====
Vishniac's photographs from the 1930s are all of a very distinct style; they are all focused on achieving the same end: capturing the unique culture of Jewish ghettos in Eastern Europe, especially the religious and impoverished. His published pictures largely center on these people, usually in small groups, going about their daily lives: very often studying (generally religious texts), walking (many times through harsh weather), and sometimes just sitting; staring. The scenes are dramatic: "There is barely a hint of a smile on any of the faces. The eyes peer at us suspiciously from behind ancient casement windows and over a peddler's tray, from crowded schoolrooms and desolate street corners." Gene Thornton, writer for The New York Times, called them "somber with poverty and with the gray light of European Winter".

The Only Flowers of her Youth, Warsaw, 1938 by Roman Vishniac, one of his most famous

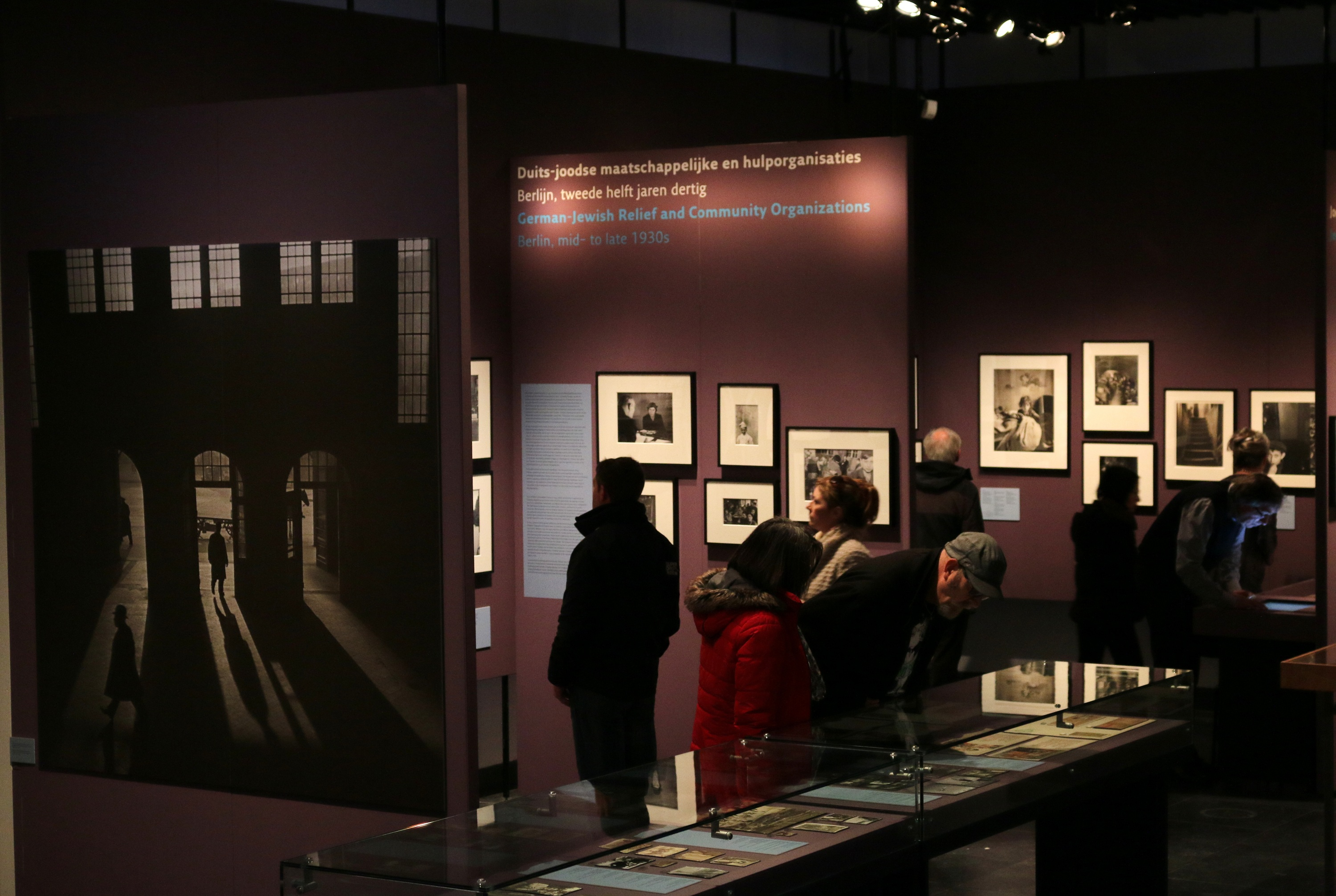
The exhibition of Roman Vishniac's photos at Amsterdam Jewish Historical Museum, 2014

These pictures, all in black and white, were done with available light or sometimes a lantern, yet they are "amazingly crisp with surprising depth of field". Indeed, "There is a grainy realism to Vishniac's photographic style. We can almost finger the coarse textures of coats and shawls; the layers of fabric worn by the people seem more related to tree bark than to the well-pressed wool suit worn by an occasional elegant passerby." Vishniac is known to have exaggerated in composing the captions of his photographs, and in some cases he may have fabricated the stories behind them.

==== Impact ====
Vishniac's photographs from this period are widely commended and on permanent display in many museums. Edward Steichen places his pre-Holocaust photographs, "among photography's finest documents of a time and place."'

Vishniac's photographs have had a profound effect on Holocaust literature and have illustrated many books about the Jewish ghettos and Holocaust. In the case of The Only Flowers of her Youth, the drama of the photograph inspired Miriam Nerlove to write a novel based on the story of the girl in the picture.

For this work, Roman Vishniac has received the Memorial Award of the American Society of Magazine Photographers in 1956. A Vanished World has won the National Jewish Book Award in the visual arts category in 1984; The Only Flowers of her Youth was deemed "most impressive" at the International Photographic Exhibition in Lucerne in 1952; and the Grand Prize for Art in Photography, New York Coliseum.

In 1955, Edward Steichen selected three of Vishniac's Eastern European photographs: of boys at a Cheder in Slonim (1938), of children and a woman in Lublin (1937), for the Museum of Modern Art world-touring The Family of Man exhibition that was seen by 9 million visitors, accompanied by a catalogue which has never been out of print.

==== Criticism ====
There has been criticism of Vishniac's work, focusing on the lack of diversity of his subjects in his work from Eastern Europe and quality of his composition. It has been argued that he should have also photographed wealthier Jews, in addition to the poor Jews in ghettos. Thornton criticized his photographs for their unprofessional qualities, citing "errors of focus and accidents of design, as when an unexplained third leg and foot protrudes from the long coat of a hurrying scholar."

When photographic curator Maya Benton began to catalog Vishniac's negatives for the archive of the International Center of Photography, she noticed that, in his book A Vanished World, Vishniac juxtaposed photos to tell stories, and wrote captions that were not supported by the material. In the final spread of the book, for example, there is a photo of a man peering through a metal door; on the opposite page a small boy points with his finger to his eye. Vishiniac's caption reads: "The father is hiding from the Endecy (members of the National Democratic Party). His son signals him that they are approaching. Warsaw, 1935–1938." At the front of the book, additional commentary reads: "The pogromshchiki" (pogrom lynch mob) "are coming. But the iron door was no protection." Benton's research found that the photos were from different rolls of film, taken in different towns, so the scene described in the book "almost certainly did not happen".

Similarly, Benton discovered negatives that showed the unsmiling little girl depicted in The Only Flowers of her Youth – whom Vishniac had claimed did not own a pair of shoes – smiling and wearing shoes.

Michael di Capua, who edited Vishniac's text for A Vanished World, has said that he felt disquiet while compiling the text, since so much information was unsubstantiated. Benton also suggested that the terms of Vishniac's commission from the JDC – to photograph "not the fullness of Eastern European Jewish life but its most needy, vulnerable corners for a fund-raising project" – had led to his overemphasizing poor, religious communities in A Vanished World.

=== Photomicroscopy and biology ===
Vishniac's daughter Mara, through the eye of a firefly: an achievement in photography and biology

In addition to the candid photography for which he is best known, Vishniac worked heavily in the field of photomicroscopy, (specifically interference microscopy and cinemicroscopy). He specialized in photographing living insects and had a talent for arranging the moving specimens in "just the right poses", according to Philippe Halsman, former president of the American Society of Magazine Photographers. On the subject of Vishniac's skill in photomicroscopy, Halsman said he was, "a special kind of genius". He worked with all sorts of specimens, from protozoa, to fireflies to amino acids. Vishniac's work in photomicroscopy was, and is, highly regarded in the field. For three consecutive years, beginning in 1952, he won the Best-of-the-Show Award of the Biological Photographic Association in New York.

One of Roman Vishniac's most famous endeavors in the field of photomicroscopy was his revolutionary photographs from the inside of a firefly's eye, behind 4,600 tiny ommatidia, complexly arranged. In addition, there were the images taken at the medical school of Boston University of the circulating blood inside a hamster's cheek pouch. Vishniac invented new methods for light-interruption photography and color photomicroscopy. His method of colorization, (developed in the 1960s and early 1970s) uses polarized light to penetrate certain formations of cell structure and may greatly improve the detail of an image.

In the field of biology, Vishniac specialized in marine microbiology, the physiology of ciliates, circulatory systems in unicellular plants and endocrinology (from his work in Berlin) and metamorphosis. Despite his aptitude and accomplishments in the field, most of his work in biology was secondary to his photography: Vishniac studied the anatomy of an organism primarily to better photograph it. Besides experimenting with the metamorphosis of axolotl, he also researched the morphology of chromosomes in 1920: both in Berlin. As a biologist and philosopher in 1950, he hypothesized polyphyletic origin, a theory that life arose from multiple, independent biochemical reactions, spawning multicellular life. As a philosopher, he "developed principles of rationalistic philosophy" in the '50s.

=== Other photography ===
Vishniac is notable for his photographs of insects mating, sea bass feasting and other living creatures in full animation. Skillfully and patiently, he would stalk insects or other such creatures for hours in the suburbs around New York City. Before beginning the hunt, he would lie for over an hour in the grass, rubbing himself with proximate flora to make himself smell less artificial. He would then gracefully swoop close to his prey and patiently frame the scene with an SLR equipped with an extension tube. He had even trained himself to hold his breath for up to two minutes, so that he could take his time and not disturb slowly exposing images.

Vishniac's subjects varied throughout his life. At times, he would focus on documenting everyday life, as in Berlin, and later portraiture, doing famous portraits of Albert Einstein and Marc Chagall. He was also a pioneer in time-lapse photography, on which he worked from 1915 to 1918, and again later in life.

== Religion and philosophy ==
Vishniac's daughter, Mara, as a young girl, poses in front of a store selling devices for differentiating between Aryan and Non-Aryan head shapes. Berlin, 1933

Roman Vishniac always had strong ties with his ancestry, especially the Jewish aspect of it, "From earliest childhood, my main interest was my ancestors". He was a Zionist and a strong sympathizer with Jews who had suffered because of anti-Semitism, "Oh yes, I could be a professor of anti-Semitism", also stating then that he had one hundred and one relatives who were murdered in the Holocaust. A famous photo of his (pictured right) of a store in Berlin selling devices for separating Jews and non-Jews by skull shape was used by him to criticize the pseudoscience of German anti-Semites.

Vishniac associated much of his work with religion, though not specifically Judaism. "Nature, God, or whatever you want to call the creator of the Universe comes through the microscope clearly and strongly," he remarked in his laboratory one day.

Living with the memory of hardship, Vishniac was, "an absolute optimist filled with tragedy. His humanism is not just for Jews, but for every living thing." He probably believed in God or some similar concept, but he was non-denominational and did not adhere strictly to the principles of any religion. He even clashed with Orthodox Jews in one well-known instance: The religious Jews he met on his trek around Europe would not let themselves be photographed, quoting the Bible and its prohibition of making of graven images. Vishniac's famous response was, "the Torah existed for thousands of years before the camera had been invented."

Vishniac was known for having great respect for all living creatures. Whenever possible, he returned a specimen to its location at the time of capture. and one time "[lent] his bathtub to tadpoles for weeks until he could return them to their pond". In accordance with this philosophy, he photographed almost exclusively living subjects.

== Publications ==
Year	Title	Notes	Source
1947	Polish Jews: A Pictorial Record	Polish Jews showcased 31 images of the life and character of these people "stressing the spiritual side of the subjects' lives and ... it did not include any of the pictures [Roman Vishniac] took to emphasize the economic struggle in which the Jews were engaged."; Essay by Abraham Joshua Heschel.	
1947	*Die Farshvundene Velt: Idishe shtet, Idishe mentshn. *The Vanished World: Jewish Cities, Jewish People	Edited by Raphael Abramovitch; title, text and captions in English and Yiddish; includes photographs by R. Vishniac, A. Kacyzna, M. Kipnis and others. First edition of the earliest and most comprehensive graphic pictorial history of Jewish life at the beginning of the Nazi era.	
1955	Spider, Egg and Microcosm: Three Men and Three Worlds of Science	Published by Eugene Kinkead; The three men were Petrunkevitch, Romanoff and Vishniac	
1956	This Living Earth (Nature Program)	Published by N. Doubleday	
1957	Mushrooms (Nature Program)	Prepared with the cooperation of the National Audubon Society; Published by N. Doubleday	
1959	Living Earth	Drawings by Louise Katz; Subject: Soil biology	
1969	A Day of Pleasure: Stories of a Boy Growing Up in Warsaw	Written by Isaac Bashevis Singer	
1971	Building Blocks of Life: Proteins, Vitamins, and Hormones Seen Through the Microscope	Published by Charles Scribner's Sons	
1972	The Concerned Photographer 2	Grossman Publishers; Edited by Cornell Capa, text by Michael Edelson; In cooperation with ICP	
1974	Roman Vishniac	of the ICP Library of Photographers	
1983	A Vanished World	Foreword by Elie Wiesel; this version is significantly different from the original version of 1947, being completely redone and with many fewer photographs. This is probably the best-known collection of Vishniac's and has independently contributed most to his popularity.	
1985	Roman Vishniac	by Darilyn Rowan, published at Arizona State University School of Art.	
1993	To Give them Light: The Legacy of Roman Vishniac	Biographical note by Mara Vishniac Kohn, edited by Marion Wiesel	
1993	Roman Vishniac: The Platinum Prints	of the International Center of Photography	
1999	Children of a Vanished World	Edited by Mara Vishniac Kohn and Hartman Flacks	
2005	Roman Vishniac's Berlin	Edited by James Howard Fraser, Mara Vishniac Kohn and Aubrey Pomerance for Jewish Museum Berlin	
2015	Roman Vishniac Rediscovered	Edited by Maya Benton for International Center of Photography	

For a more complete list of publications by and about Roman Vishniac, see pages 94 and 95 of Roman Vishniac published by ICP and the Library of Congress archive.

== Major exhibitions ==
Year	Location	Notes	Source
1943	Teacher's College, Columbia University, New York City	One-man show of photographs of impoverished Eastern European Jews	
1962	IBM Gallery, New York	One-man show; "Through the Looking Glass"	
1971	The Jewish Museum, New York	"The Concerns of Roman Vishniac"; The first comprehensive showing of Vishniac's work, produced by ICP	
1972–1973	Art Gallery of the University at Albany, The State University of New York; The Corcoran Gallery of Art, Washington D.C.; New Jersey Public Library, Fair Lawn; Kol Ami Museum, Los Angeles; Judaica Museum, Phoenix	"The Concerns of Roman Vishniac" circulated around the US by ICP. This exhibit was probably a continuation of the last one at the Jewish Museum; however, it is listed as a separate production in Roman Vishniac	
1993	International Center of Photography, New York City	"Man, Nature, and Science, 1930–1985"	
2001	Spertus Museum, Chicago	50 of Vishniac's photographs from Roman Vishniac Children of a Vanished World; Mara Vishniac Kohn guest speaker	
2005–2007	Jewish Museum Berlin, Goethe-Institut, New York	Title: "Roman Vishniac's Berlin"; exhibiting 90 images in Berlin, some never before seen by the public.	
2013–2016	International Center of Photography, New York City, Museum of Art Fort Lauderdale, Jewish Historical Museum, Amsterdam, Musée d'Art et d'Histoire du Judaïsme, Paris, Museum of the History of Polish Jews, Warsaw, Museum of Fine Arts, Houston, Contemporary Jewish Museum, San Francisco	Title: "Roman Vishniac Rediscovered"; Retrospective exhibition of Vishniac's entire body of work including previously unseen work.	
2020–present	The Magnes Collection of Jewish Art and Life, University of California, Berkeley	New York, 1971-72]"	

== Documentaries ==
Year	Name	Director	Source
2023	VISHNIAC (2023)	Laura Bialis	

== See also ==
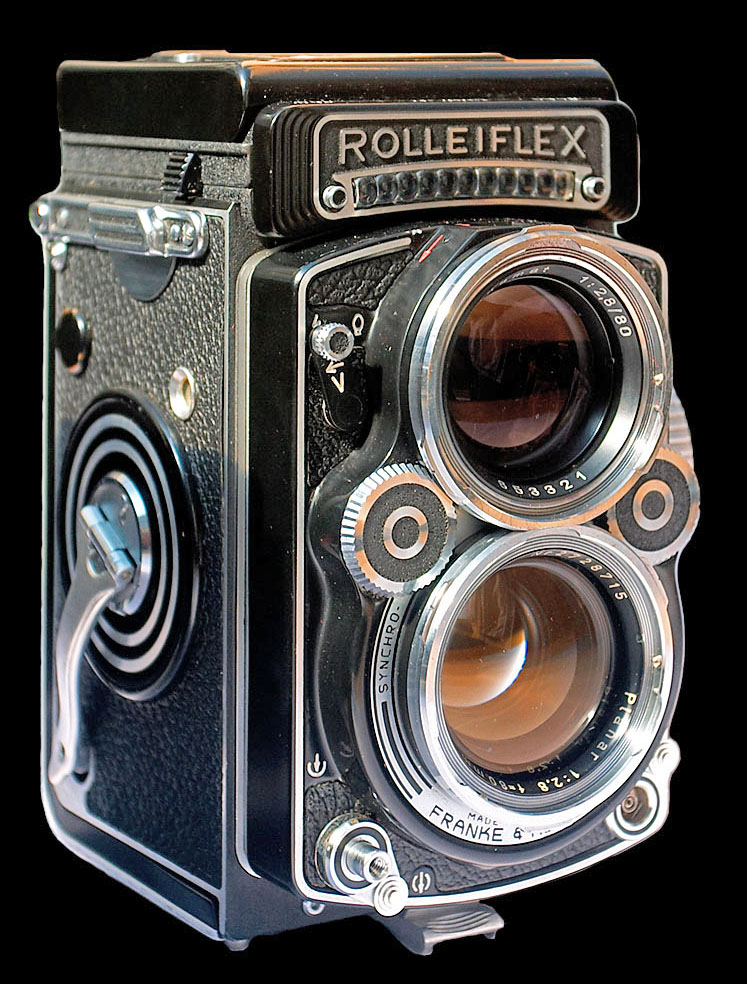
Later model of the Rolleiflex camera such as was used by Vishniac in Eastern Europe

=== Organizations ===
- International Center of Photography
- American Jewish Joint Distribution Committee — Originally commissioned Vishniac's trips to Eastern Europe.
- The Magnes Collection of Jewish Art and Life — Owner of the copyrights of the Roman Vishniac Archive.

=== Photography ===
- Time-lapse — Technique pioneered by Vishniac.
- Documentary photography

=== People ===
- Wolf V. Vishniac — Son, microbiologist, died in 1973 during an Antarctic expedition.
- Ethan Vishniac — Grandson of Roman, son of Wolf, editor of the Astrophysical Journal.
- Mark Vishniak – First cousin, politician, lawyer, historian, editor Time Magazine.
- Cornell Capa — Founder of ICP.
- Alter Kacyzne — A contemporary of Vishniac's, who photographed similar subjects. He was murdered in a Ukrainian pogrom in 1941.
