= Boris P. Stoicheff =

Canadian physicist (1924–2010)

Boris P. Stoicheff FRS
- Boris P. Stoicheff
- Born: Boris Peter Stoicheff; June 1, 1924; Bitola, Kingdom of Serbs, Croats and Slovenes (present-day North Macedonia)
- Died: April 15, 2010 (aged 85); Toronto, Ontario, Canada
- Citizenship: Canadian
- Education: University of Toronto (Ph.D. 1950)
- Awards: William F. Meggers Award (1981); Frederic Ives Medal (1983); Henry Marshall Tory Medal (1989)
- Scientific career
- Fields: Physics
- Institutions: National Research Council (Canada); University of Toronto
- Thesis: Raman spectroscopy of gases at high pressures (1950)
- Doctoral advisor: Harry Lambert Welsh
- Other academic advisors: Gerhard Herzberg (Post doctoral advisor)

Boris P. Stoicheff, FRS, (June 1, 1924 – April 15, 2010) was a Macedonian Canadian physicist.

== Biography ==
Stoicheff was born in Bitola, in the Kingdom of Yugoslavia (present-day North Macedonia). His family emigrated to Canada 1931, and he grew up in Toronto. He earned a degree in Engineering Physics from the University of Toronto in 1947, and a PhD from the same institution in 1950. He stayed for another year at Toronto on a fellowship, then went to the National Research Council (Canada) in Ottawa to work as a postdoctoral researcher in the spectroscopy laboratory headed by Gerhard Herzberg, where he worked on Raman scattering. In 1953 he was promoted at the National Research Council (Canada) to a permanent research position.

Stoicheff became well known for his Raman spectroscopy through the 1950s, publishing a number of previously unavailable high-resolution molecular spectra. In 1954, he married his wife Joan, and they had a son, Peter Stoicheff, in 1956 (who would go on to become the President of the University of Saskatchewan). In the late 1950s, he became interested in Brillouin scattering, and attempted to build a laser, though Theodore Maiman succeeded in doing so first. Stoicheff nonetheless soon built the first laser in Canada, and researched using it for spectroscopy. He spent a sabbatical year in 1963 at MIT, working with Charles Townes and some of Townes's graduate students on the same subject, and in 1964 took a professorship at the University of Toronto.

In the late 1970s he changed focus from Brillouin spectroscopy to Rydberg spectroscopy. He retired in 1989, though continued to perform research. By 2000, he was working on the origin of diffuse interstellar bands.

== Honors and awards ==
He was elected a Fellow of the Royal Society in 1975 and a Fellow of The Optical Society in 1964. He served as president of the Optical Society of America in 1976 and was awarded their William F. Meggers Award in 1981 and their Frederic Ives Medal in 1983. He also received the Henry Marshall Tory Medal, in 1989. Later, OSA awarded him the Distinguished Service Award in 2002.

== Tributes ==
Since 2011, the Optical Society of America and the Canadian Association of Physicists sponsors a scholarship in his name that is awarded annually to an undergraduate or graduate student who has demonstrated both research excellence and significant service in either professional organizations.

== See also ==
- Inverse Raman effect
- Stimulated Brillouin scattering
- Singlet fission
- Supercontinuum
