= M. Francesca Cotrufo =

Italian soil ecologist

- Born: Naples, Italy
- Education: BS University of Naples, Italy; PhD Lancaster University, UK
- Awards: ASA-CSSA-SSSA Mentoring Award; NREL Best Mentor Award; NREL Most Publications Award; NREL Outstanding Advisor; Wolf Vishniac Award for Excellence
- Scientific career
- Fields: Soil ecology; Biogeochemistry
- Workplaces: Colorado State University Second University of Naples
- Website: www.nrel.colostate.edu/investigator/francesca-cotrufo-homepage

M. Francesca Cotrufo is a soil ecologist who focuses her work on litter decomposition and the dynamics of soil organic matter. She is currently a Professor and Associate Head in the Department of Soil and Crop Sciences, as well the Senior Scientist at the Natural Resource Ecology Lab, at Colorado State University.

== Early life and education ==
Cotrufo was born in Naples, Italy. In high school she was passionate about science and ancient Greek. Cotrufo decided to further her studies in Biology, rather than ancient languages, because of the possibility to make novel discoveries that were relevant to the world's problems. Cotrufo earned her B.S. in Biology from the University of Naples, Italy in 1991. While there, she became interested in the environment and litter decomposition. Cotrufo wrote her undergraduate honor thesis, "Effects of urban heavy metal pollution on organic matter decomposition in Quercus ilex woods," in the lab of the only professor of ecology at her university. She went on to earn her Ph.D. in Soil Ecology from Lancaster University, UK in 1995, where she worked with Phil Ineson as her advisor and studied soil organic matter and its formation from the decomposition of plant inputs.

== Career and research ==
Cotrufo worked as a research scientist in the Department of Environmental Sciences at the Second University of Naples from 1994 to 2000. She then became an associate professor in the department until 2006, when she was promoted to Full Professor.

In 2008, Cotrufo began working as a Full Professor in the Department of Soil and Crop Sciences, and Senior Scientist in the Natural Resource Ecology Laboratory, at Colorado State University. She continues to hold both of these positions. In 2017, Cotrufo became the Associate Head of the Department of Soil and Crop Sciences at Colorado State University.

Cotrufo researches litter decomposition and soil organic matter carbon and nitrogen dynamics. She is most interested in studying how carbon and nitrogen are exchanged through plant litter, soil, and the atmosphere, especially focusing on how C and N fluxes respond to changes in environment. Cotrufo uses isotope methodologies to study soil organic matter formation and persistence in different terrestrial ecosystems. Through working to understand the processes that drive the formation of soil organic matter and control its response to climate change, Cotrufo also proposes practices to manage soil that both combat climate change and improve overall soil health. Additionally, she is currently researching biochar, a stable, carbon-rich solid that has the possibility to improve crop yields while also sequestering carbon. Her research on biochar looks at its application to food production in drylands as well as the recovery of soils. Cotrufo's most cited article “Elevated CO_{2} Reduces the Nitrogen Concentration of Plant Tissues”, explores plant nitrogen concentration as a response to elevated levels of CO_{2}.

In addition to her research, Cotrufo is passionate about promoting education and outreach activities that will help others become aware about the ways that humans can reduce their impacts on the earth and implement more sustainable practices.

== Awards and honors ==
=== Leadership positions ===
- Editor of Global Change Biology
- Advisory Board of Editors for Plant and Soil
- Committee Chair of the EcoCore Analytical Service at Colorado State University

=== Awards and fellowships ===
In 2017, Cotrufo received the Mentoring Award for her success as a research scientist who is equally passionate about the success and learning of her students. Cotrufo actively supports and promotes women in soil science and has mentored over 40 women towards success as students, post-doctorates, research scientists, faculty, and teachers. In 2024, in recognition of her contributions to biogeochemical sciences, she was named as a Fellow by the American Geophysical Union.

She has also received the following awards:

- 2017 NREL Best Mentor Award
- 2016 NREL Most Publications Award
- 2013 OECD Co-Operative Research Program Fellow
- 2010 NREL Outstanding Advisor
- 1998 Smithsonian Institution Research Fellow
- 1996 EU COST Action 619 Research Fellow
- 1995 European Environmental Research Organization Research Fellow
- 1995 Wolf Vishniac Award for Excellence, XII International Symposium on Environmental Biogeochemistry, Rio de Janeiro, Brazil
- 1994-95 British Council Research Fellow

== Publications ==
Cotrufo has published over 90 peer reviewed articles.

As indexed by Google Scholar:

- Cotrufo, M. F., Ineson, P., & Scott, A. (1998). Elevated CO2 reduces the nitrogen concentration of plant tissues. Global Change Biology, 4(1), 43–54.
- Cotrufo, M. F., Wallenstein, M. D., Boot, C. M., Denef, K., & Paul, E. (2013). The Microbial Efficiency‐Matrix Stabilization (MEMS) framework integrates plant litter decomposition with soil organic matter stabilization: do labile plant inputs form stable soil organic matter?. Global Change Biology, 19(4), 988–995.
- Subke, J. A., Inglima, I., & Francesca Cotrufo, M. (2006). Trends and methodological impacts in soil CO2 efflux partitioning: a metaanalytical review. Global Change Biology, 12(6), 921–943.
- Norby, R. J., Cotrufo, M. F., Ineson, P., O’Neill, E. G., & Canadell, J. G. (2001). Elevated CO 2, litter chemistry, and decomposition: a synthesis. Oecologia, 127(2), 153–165.
- Del Galdo, I., Six, J., Peressotti, A., & Francesca Cotrufo, M. (2003). Assessing the impact of land‐use change on soil C sequestration in agricultural soils by means of organic matter fractionation and stable C isotopes. Global change biology, 9(8), 1204–1213.
