= The Astrophysical Journal =

Academic journal founded in 1895

- Discipline: Astronomy, Astrophysics
- Language: English
- Edited by: Ethan Vishniac

Publication details
- History: 1895–present
- Publisher: IOP Publishing for the American Astronomical Society
- Frequency: 3/month
- Open access: Gold open access
- Impact factor: 4.8 (Journal); 8.8 (Letters); 8.6 (Supplement) (2023)

Standard abbreviations
- ISO 4: Astrophys. J.

Indexing
- ISSN: 0004-637X (print); 1538-4357 (web)

Links
- Journal homepage; The Astrophysical Journal Letters; The Astrophysical Journal Supplement Series

The Astrophysical Journal (ApJ) is a peer-reviewed scientific journal of astrophysics and astronomy, established in 1895 by American astronomers George Ellery Hale and James Edward Keeler. The journal discontinued its print edition and became an electronic-only journal in 2015.

Since 1953, The Astrophysical Journal Supplement Series (ApJS) has been published in conjunction with The Astrophysical Journal, with generally longer articles to supplement the material in the journal. It publishes six volumes per year, with two 280-page issues per volume.

The Astrophysical Journal Letters (ApJL), established in 1967 by Subrahmanyan Chandrasekhar as Part 2 of The Astrophysical Journal, is now a separate journal focusing on the rapid publication of high-impact astronomical research.

The three journals were published by the University of Chicago Press for the American Astronomical Society until, in January 2009, publication was transferred to IOP Publishing, following the move of the society's Astronomical Journal in 2008. The reason for the changes were given by the society as the increasing financial demands of the University of Chicago Press. Compared to journals in other scientific disciplines, The Astrophysical Journal has a larger (> 85%) acceptance rate, which, however, is similar to other journals covering astronomy and astrophysics.

On January 1, 2022, the AAS Journals, including ApJ, changed to an open access model, with access restrictions and subscription charges removed from previously published papers. Articles accepted after October 11, 2022, will be published under the Creative Commons license CC-BY-SA 4.0. Non-open access articles accepted before that date will be free to access but will still need permission to reuse.

== History ==
The journal was founded in 1895 by George Ellery Hale and James E. Keeler as The Astrophysical Journal: An International Review of Spectroscopy and Astronomical Physics. In addition to the two founding editors, there was an international board of associate editors: M. A. Cornu, Paris; N. C. Dunér, Upsala; William Huggins, London; P. Tacchini, Rome; H. C. Vogel, Potsdam, C. S. Hastings, Yale; A. A. Michelson, Chicago; E. C. Pickering, Harvard; H. A. Rowland, Johns Hopkins; and C. A. Young, Princeton. It was intended that the journal would fill the gap between journals in astronomy and physics, providing a venue for publication of articles on astronomical applications of the spectroscope; on laboratory research closely allied to astronomical physics, including wavelength determinations of metallic and gaseous spectra and experiments on radiation and absorption; on theories of the Sun, Moon, planets, comets, meteors, and nebulae; and on instrumentation for telescopes and laboratories. The further development of ApJ up to 1995 was outlined by Helmut Abt in an article entitled "Some Statistical Highlights of the Astrophysical Journal" in 1995.

== Editors ==
The following persons have been editors-in-chief of the journal:

- George Hale (1895–1902)
- Edwin Brant Frost (1902–1932)
- Otto Struve (1932–1947)
- W.W. Morgan (1947–1952)
- Subrahmanyan Chandrasekhar (1952–1971)
- Helmut A. Abt (1971–1999)
- Robert Kennicutt (1999–2006)
- Ethan Vishniac (2006–present)

== See also ==
- The Astronomical Journal
- Astronomy and Astrophysics
- Monthly Notices of the Royal Astronomical Society
- Publications of the Astronomical Society of the Pacific
- Publications of the Astronomical Society of Australia
