= Ethan Vishniac =

American astrophysicist (born 1955)

- Born: Ethan Tecumseh Vishniac; 1955 (age 70–71)
- Education: University of Rochester; Harvard University
- Known for: Instabilities in expanding blast waves
- Spouse: Ilene Busch-Vishniac
- Father: Wolf V. Vishniac
- Relatives: Roman Vishniac (grandfather)
- Scientific career
- Fields: Astrophysics
- Workplaces: University of Texas at Austin; McMaster University; University of Saskatchewan; Johns Hopkins University
- Thesis: Topics in the evolution of cosmological perturbations (1980)
- Doctoral advisor: William H. Press
- Other academic advisors: Jeremiah P. Ostriker (post doctoral advisor)
- Website: physics-astronomy.jhu.edu/directory/ethan-vishniac/

Ethan Tecumseh Vishniac (born 1955) is an American astrophysicist. He is the Editor-in-Chief of the Astrophysical Journal and a professor of Astronomy at Johns Hopkins University in Baltimore, after holding positions at University of Saskatchewan in Saskatoon, McMaster University in Hamilton, Ontario, Canada, and University of Texas in Austin.

== Education ==
Vishniac graduated from University of Rochester and Harvard University. He received his Ph.D. in astrophysics in 1980 from Harvard University while working under the direction of William H. Press. After Harvard, Vishniac spent two years as a post doctoral fellow working under Jeremiah P. Ostriker at Princeton University.

== Research ==
His best known scientific work is the study of instabilities in expanding blast waves. In Vishniac (1983), he demonstrated that a blast wave expanding in a sufficiently compressible medium would be subject to a linear overstability growing as the square root of time. This is usually known as the Vishniac instability, and generally occurs in any thin enough slab bounded by a shock on one side and a contact discontinuity to a higher temperature region on the other. In Vishniac (1994) he then demonstrated that a thin-enough slab bounded by shocks on both sides is subject to a nonlinear instability, usually described as a nonlinear thin shell instability (NTSI). He has also worked with success in cosmology and the theory of astrophysical dynamos.

== Honors and awards ==
- 2001: Elected Fellow of the American Physical Society "for pioneering contributions to the study of blast-wave stability, the generation of secondary anisotropies in the microwave background, and the study of MHD turbulence and dynamos in astrophysical objects."

== Personal life ==
He is the son of microbiologist Wolf V. Vishniac and grandson of photographer Roman Vishniac. His wife Ilene Busch-Vishniac, the ninth president of the University of Saskatchewan (2012–2014), was previously Dean of the Faculty of Engineering at Johns Hopkins, and provost and vice-president (academic) of McMaster University from 2007 until 2012.

== General references ==
- Vishniac, E. T. 1983, Astrophys. J., 274, 152
- Vishniac, E. T. 1994, Astrophys. J., 428, 186
