= Wolf V. Vishniac =

American microbiologist (1922–1973)

- Born: Wolf Vladimir Vishniac; April 22, 1922; Berlin, Germany
- Died: December 10, 1973 (aged 51); Asgard Range, Wright Valley, Antarctica
- Spouse: Helen Vishniac
- Children: Ethan Vishniac
- Father: Roman Vishniac
- Relatives: Ilene Busch-Vishniac (daughter-in-law)
- Scientific career
- Fields: Microbiology Astrobiology
- Institutions: University of Rochester

Wolf Vladimir Vishniac (April 22, 1922 – December 10, 1973) was an American microbiologist. He was the son of photographer Roman Vishniac and the father of astronomer Ethan Vishniac. Educated at Brooklyn College and Stanford University, he was a professor of biology at the University of Rochester. He died on a research trip to the Antarctic attempting to retrieve equipment in a crevasse. The crater Vishniac on Mars is named in his honor.

Wolf Vishniac contributed greatly to the search for life on Mars by developing a special miniature laboratory that could be transported to that planet, known as the "Wolf Trap". This research was supported by a NASA grant started in 1959, the first for the biological sciences.

== Wolf Vishniac Memorial Award ==
A Wolf Vishniac Memorial Award for Young Researchers is awarded at the biennially held International Symposium On Environmental Biogeochemistry (ISEB). The award is presented to researchers no older than 35 years who must be a first author and give a presentation at the symposium. A notable recipient is Sergey Zimov, who received the award at the ISEB-10 in 1991. Other recipients include M. Francesca Cotrufo at the ISEB-12 (1995), Alexis S. Templeton at the ISEB-14 (1999), Kamlesh Jangid at the ISEB-14 (1999), Salwa Hamdi at the ISEB-19 (2009), and Jillian M. Petersen at the ISEB-20 (2011).

== In culture ==
In his 1980 TV series Cosmos: A Personal Voyage, Carl Sagan told the story of Wolf Vishniac in Episode 5, "Blues for a Red Planet".
