= Phil Ineson =

English academic

- Awards: Marsh Ecology Award (2006)
- Scientific career
- Institutions: University of York
- Doctoral students: M. Francesca Cotrufo

Phil Ineson is a chair in Global Change Ecology at the University of York. Ineson is particularly noted for his work with stable isotopes (and was the first to grow C3 plants on C4 soil).

Ineson received his BSc from Manchester Polytechnic in 1976, receiving a Ph.D. from the University of Liverpool in 1986. He was then a NERC Post-Doctoral Research Assistant at the University of Exeter until 1989. NERC Research Fellow at ITE Merlewood and later Senior Scientific Officer (SSO). Between 1996 and 1999 he was at the Centre for Ecology and Hydrology, (CEH) Merlewood. Between 1998 and 2000 he was visiting professor at Lancaster University. He was made chair in Global Change Ecology at York in 2000.

Ineson et al. (1996) were able to track the movement of carbon through a plant by using the stable isotopes of carbon, namely ^{12}C and ^{13}C. To obtain soil with a different isotope ratio to normal, they obtained soil from North America on which C4 plants had been grown, giving it a different signature to soil on which C3 plants had been grown. Comparisons of the signatures allowed the turnover of carbon to be measured. This is now a commonly used technique (see e.g. Pataki et al. (2003)) particularly useful in light of elevated carbon dioxide levels due to atmospheric pollution.
