= Vishniac (crater) =

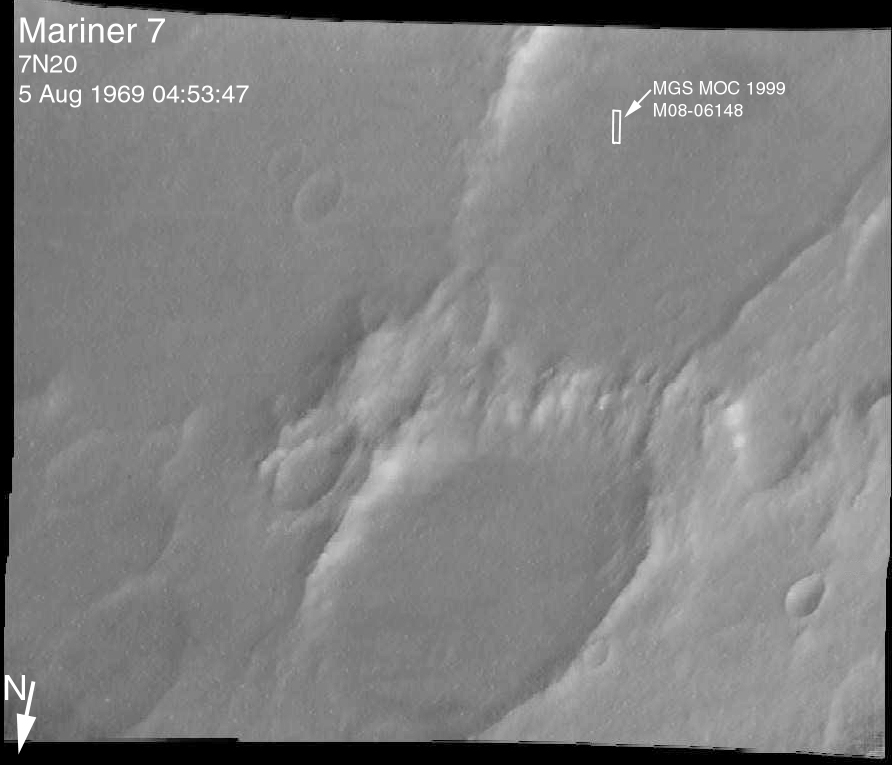
- Giant's Footprint
- Planet: Mars
- Coordinates: 76.7°S 276.1°W
- Quadrangle: Mare Australe
- Diameter: 80.47 km (50 mi)
- Discoverer: Mariner 7
- Eponym: Wolf V. Vishniac

Vishniac is the larger crater of the Martian surface feature called the Giant's Footprint. It was named after Wolf V. Vishniac, a microbiologist who died on an expedition to Antarctica. Professor Carl Sagan felt very bad for the scientist, and so found an unnamed crater at the exact longitude and latitude that he died on Mars and named it after him. The feature was originally observed by Mariner 7 in 1969. In 1999, the Mars Global Surveyor's Mars Orbiter Camera was able to provide more detailed pictures. The crater measures approximately 80.47 kilometres (50 mi) in diameter. Its name was approved by the International Astronomical Union in 1976.
