= Herero and Nama genocide and the Holocaust =

Study of the two genocides by Germany

The Herero and Nama genocide has commanded the attention of historians who study complex issues of continuity between the Herero and Nama genocide and the Holocaust. It is argued that the Herero and Nama genocide set a precedent in Imperial Germany that would later be followed by Nazi Germany's establishment of death camps.

== Overview ==
According to Benjamin Madley, the German experience in South West Africa was a crucial precursor to Nazi colonialism and genocide. He argues that personal connections, literature, and public debates served as conduits for communicating colonialist and genocidal ideas and methods from the colony to Germany. Tony Barta, an honorary research associate at La Trobe University, argues that the Herero and Nama genocide was an inspiration for Hitler in his war against the Jews, Slavs, Romani, and others whom he described as "non-Aryans".

According to Clarence Lusane, Eugen Fischer's medical experiments can be seen as a testing ground for medical procedures which were later followed during the Nazi Holocaust. Fischer later became chancellor of the University of Berlin, where he taught medicine to Nazi physicians. Otmar Freiherr von Verschuer was a student of Fischer, and Verschuer himself had a prominent pupil, Josef Mengele. Franz Ritter von Epp, who was later responsible for the liquidation of virtually all Bavarian Jews and Roma as governor of Bavaria, took part in the Herero and Nama genocide as well. Historians Robert Gerwarth and Stephan Malinowski have criticized this claim, asserting that Von Epp exercised no influence in Nazi extermination policies.

Mahmood Mamdani argues that the links between the Herero and Nama genocide and the Holocaust are beyond the execution of an annihilation policy and the establishment of concentration camps and there are also ideological similarities in the conduct of both genocides. Focusing on a written statement by General Trotha which is translated as:

I destroy the African tribes with streams of blood ... Only following this cleansing can something new emerge, which will remain.

Mamdani takes note of the similarity between the aims of the General and the Nazis. According to Mamdani, in both cases there was a Social Darwinist notion of "cleansing", after which "something new" would "emerge".

Robert Gerwarth and Stephan Malinowski have questioned the supposed link with the Holocaust, finding it to be lacking in empirical evidence, and argue that Nazi policy represented a distinct turn away from typical European colonial practice. Additionally, they write that studies supporting the link completely ignore the influences of World War I, the German Revolution, and the activities of the Freikorps in the inurement of extreme violence as a method in the German political consciousness.

Patrick Bernhard writes that the Nazis, including Heinrich Himmler, explicitly rejected the colonial experience of the German Empire as an "appallingly outdated" model; when they did draw inspiration from colonialism for Generalplan Ost, it was from the contemporary work of Italian fascists such as Giuseppe Tassinari in Libya, which they viewed as a shining example of fascist modernity.

== See also ==
- Imperial boomerang, a sociopolitical theory positing that domestic repression draws from techniques originally developed to enforce imperialism and colonialism.
- Armenian genocide and the Holocaust
- Libyan genocide and the Holocaust
