= 1978 Men's Hockey World Cup =

Men's field hockey tournament

1978 Hockey World Cup
Copa Mundial de Hockey Masculino de 1978 (Spanish)

Tournament details
- Host country: Argentina
- City: Buenos Aires
- Dates: 19 March – 2 April
- Teams: 14
- Venue: Campo de Polo

Final positions
- Champions: Pakistan (2nd title)
- Runner-up: Netherlands
- Third place: Australia

Tournament statistics
- Matches played: 55
- Goals scored: 225 (4.09 per match)
- Top scorer: Paul Litjens (15 goals)

The 1978 Men's Hockey World Cup was the fourth Hockey World Cup men's field hockey tournament. It was held in Buenos Aires, Argentina. It was won by Pakistan, who defeated the Netherlands 3–2 in the final. The host nation, Argentina, finished eighth. India were the defending champions but they did not qualify for the semi-finals, eventually placing sixth.

== Preliminary round ==
=== Pool A ===
Pos	Team	Pld	W	D	L	GF	GA	GD	Pts	Qualification
1	Australia	6	5	0	1	18	7	+11	10	Semi-finals
2	West Germany	6	3	2	1	25	13	+12	8	Semi-finals
3	India	6	3	1	2	8	12	−4	7	Fifth to eighth place
4	England	6	1	3	2	7	7	0	5	Fifth to eighth place
5	Poland	6	2	0	4	15	24	−9	4	Ninth to twelfth place
6	Canada	6	1	2	3	12	16	−4	4	Ninth to twelfth place
7	Belgium	6	1	2	3	12	18	−6	4	

Source: FIH

Defending champions India were to play Belgium on 18 March 1978 as the opening fixture of the tournament but was postponed due to heavy rains the previous day.

19 March 1978

West Germany	4–3	Canada
Strodter 28', 40'; Seifer 40', 66'	Report	Wood 18', 57'; Hobkirk 43'

19 March 1978

India	1–0	Belgium
Philips 42'	Report

21 March 1978

West Germany	9–4	Poland
Seifer 10', 50'; Strodter 24', 39', 52'; Peter 28'; Dopp 53', 65'; Trump 61'	Report	Rachwalski 35'; Jó. Wybieralski 41', 44'; Merlinger 46'

21 March 1978

Australia	2–0	England
Cooke 45'; Bell 49'	Report

21 March 1978

India	1–3	Canada
Philips 55'	Report	Hobkirk 57', 67'; Wood 69'

22 March 1978

Belgium	3–3	West Germany
Miserque 39'; Verdussen 46'; Moraux 47'	Report	Strodter 29', 32', 51'

22 March 1978

England	3–0	Poland
Long 13', 43'; Whitaker 41'	Report

22 March 1978

Australia	0–2	India
	Report	Baldev 15'; Ashok 56'

24 March 1978

Belgium	2–5	Australia
Miserque 29'; Van Tuyckom 66'	Report	Cooke 22', 48', 63'; Charlesworth 34'; Dancer 46'

25 March 1978

Canada	3–3	England
Hobkirk 48'; Wood 60'; Hoos 68'	Report	Long 3', 20', 26'

25 March 1978

India	0–7	West Germany
	Report	Montag 27'; Strodter 28', 41'; Seifert 42'; Dopp 49', 54'; Trump 60'

25 March 1978

Australia	4–1	Poland
Cooke 14', 36'; Smith 21'; Browning 40'	Report	Je. Wybieralski 19'

26 March 1978

England	0–0	West Germany
	Report

26 March 1978

Poland	1–3	India
Rachwalski 5'	Report	Ashok 15'; Baldev 46'; Surinder 68'

26 March 1978

Canada	2–2	Belgium
Hobkirk 12'; Chohan 53'	Report	Miserque 16'; Van Tuyckom 69'

28 March 1978

Canada	0–4	Australia
	Report	Cooke 14'; Bell 31'; Browning 50'; Dick 52'

28 March 1978

England	1–1	India
Long 63'	Report	Philips 10'

28 March 1978

Poland	7–4	Belgium
Jó. Wybieralski 3'; Kruś 15'; Bąk 26'; Merlinger 33'; A. Wybieralski 44'; Rachwalski 50'; Myśliwiec 68'	Report	Verdussen 12'; Van Tuyckom 62'; Miserque 69', 70'

29 March 1978

Belgium	1–0	England
Van Strydonck 63'	Report

29 March 1978

Poland	2–1	Canada
Merlinger 9'; Jó. Wybieralski 60'	Report	Chohan 20'

29 March 1978

West Germany	2–3	Australia
Strodter 22', 47'	Report	Cooke 12', 18'; Dick 15'

=== Pool B ===
Pos	Team	Pld	W	D	L	GF	GA	GD	Pts	Qualification
1	Pakistan	6	6	0	0	31	2	+29	12	Semi-finals
2	Netherlands	6	5	0	1	21	9	+12	10	Semi-finals
3	Spain	6	3	1	2	7	4	+3	7	Fifth to eighth place
4	Argentina	6	2	2	2	9	12	−3	6	Fifth to eighth place
5	Malaysia	6	1	2	3	7	10	−3	4	Ninth to twelfth place
6	Ireland	6	1	1	4	8	19	−11	3	Ninth to twelfth place
7	Italy	6	0	0	6	1	28	−27	0	

Source: FIH

19 March 1978

Argentina	2–1	Ireland
Quaquarini 15'; Garraffo 60'	Report	Gregg 12'

19 March 1978

Spain	1–0	Malaysia
Monsalve 2'	Report

21 March 1978

Pakistan	9–0	Ireland
Islahuddin 8', 19'; Shahnaz 14', 33', 63'; Hanif 24'; Samiullah 27', 70'; Ehsanullah 42'	Report

21 March 1978

Netherlands	8–0	Italy
Litjens 7', 8', 42', 52'; Leefers 54', 70'; Doyer 62'; Kruize 64'	Report

21 March 1978

Malaysia	1–1	Argentina
Avtar 30'	Report	Disera 55'

22 March 1978

Italy	0–7	Pakistan
	Report	Munawwar 5', 24', 48'; Islahuddin 57'; Shahnaz 60'; Ehsanullah 67'; Hanif 69'

22 March 1978

Ireland	0–1	Spain
	Report	Arbós 8'

22 March 1978

Netherlands	2–1	Malaysia
R. Steens 20'; Litjens 69'	Report	Shanmuganathan 37'

25 March 1978

Italy	0–4	Argentina
	Report	Garraffo 21', 42'; Barreiros 31'; Ruiz 58'

25 March 1978

Pakistan	3–1	Netherlands
Munawwar 16'; Manzoor 42'; Akhtar 59'	Report	Litjens 19'

25 March 1978

Malaysia	2–2	Ireland
Avtar 27', 62'	Report	McGladdery 34'; Gregg 60'

26 March 1978

Argentina	0–0	Spain
	Report

26 March 1978

Malaysia	0–3	Pakistan
	Report	Hanif 34', 47'; Islahuddin 47'

26 March 1978

Ireland	3–0	Italy
McGladdery 17', 66'; Gregg 19'	Report

27 March 1978

Spain	1–2	Netherlands
Garralda 24'	Report	Doyer; Litjens 49'

28 March 1978

Pakistan	2–1	Spain
Shahnaz 12'; Manzoor 35'	Report	Chaves 34'

28 March 1978

Italy	1–3	Malaysia
Carta 61'	Report	Shanmuganathan 5', 16'; Avtar 25'

28 March 1978

Netherlands	3–2	Argentina
Kruize 8'; Litjens 31', 66'	Report	Sabbione 4'; Garraffo 9'

29 March 1978

Spain	3–0	Italy
J. Amat 33'; J. Fábregas 34', 58'	Report

29 March 1978

Ireland	2–5	Netherlands
Douglas 21'; Gregg 62'	Report	Litjens 23', 29', 56'; R. Steens 43'; Van 't Hek 58'

29 March 1978

Argentina	0–7	Pakistan
	Report	Manzoor 13', 24', 28', 30'; Munawwar 31'; Shahnaz 47'; Hanif 53'

== Classification round ==
=== Thirteenth and fourteenth place ===
1 April 1978

Belgium	1–2	Italy
Solie 40'	Report	Carta 8'; Pupatti 34'

=== Ninth to twelfth place ===
Crossover
31 March
Poland (pen.)	1 (5)
Ireland	1 (4)
31 March
Malaysia	2
Canada	0

Ninth place
1 April
Poland	1
Malaysia	0
Eleventh place
1 April
Ireland	1
Canada	3

==== Crossover ====
31 March 1978

Poland	1–1 (a.e.t.)	Ireland
Bąk 12'	Report	Douglas 10'
Penalties
Jó. Wybieralski (penalty shoot-out scored); Dereziński (penalty shoot-out scored); Rachwalski (penalty shoot-out scored); Kruś (penalty shoot-out scored); Je. Wybieralski (penalty shoot-out scored)	5–4	(penalty shoot-out scored) Hardy; (penalty shoot-out scored) Latta; (penalty shoot-out scored) Gregg; (penalty shoot-out missed) Sinnamon; (penalty shoot-out scored) McGladdery

31 March 1978

Malaysia	2–0	Canada
Avtar 5'; Rajan 62'	Report

==== Eleventh and twelfth place ====
1 April 1978

Ireland	1–3	Canada
Gregg 48'	Report	Hobkirk 32', 41'; Wood 45'

==== Ninth and tenth place ====
1 April 1978

Poland	1–0	Malaysia
Bąk 15'	Report

=== Fifth to eighth place ===
Crossover
31 March
India	3
Argentina	2
31 March
Spain (a.e.t)	2
England	1

Fifth place
1 April
India	0
Spain	2
Seventh place
1 April
Argentina	1
England	3

==== Crossover ====
31 March 1978

India	3–2	Argentina
Vasudevan 12'; Surinder 49', 64'	Report	Garraffo 57'; Sabbione 58'

31 March 1978

Spain	2–1 (a.e.t.)	England
Segura 18'; Arbós 89'	Report	Long 11'

==== Seventh and eighth place ====
1 April 1978

Argentina	1–3	England
Garraffo 28'	Report	Whitaker 2'; Smith 30'; Long 60'

==== Fifth and sixth place ====
1 April 1978

India	0–2	Spain
	Report	Pellón 26'; F. Fábregas 29'

== Medal round ==
Semi-finals
31 March
Australia	2
Netherlands	3
31 March
Pakistan (a.e.t)	1
West Germany	0

Final
2 April
Netherlands	2
Pakistan	3
Third place
2 April
Australia	4
West Germany	3

=== Semi-finals ===
31 March 1978

Australia	2–3	Netherlands
Charlesworth 25'; Cooke 59'	Report	Bolhuis 1'; Litjens 6', 30'

31 March 1978

Pakistan	1–0 (a.e.t.)	West Germany
Islahuddin 83'	Report

=== Third and fourth place ===
2 April 1978

Australia	4–3	West Germany
Cooke 8', 39'; Bell 41'; Browning 61'	Report	Dopp 14'; Strodter 28', 66'

=== Final ===
2 April 1978

Netherlands	2–3	Pakistan
Kruize 9'; Litjens 40'	Report	Rasool 2'; Islahuddin 46'; Ehsanullah 63'

Attendance: 15,000
Umpires:
Horacio Servetto (ARG)
Louis-Michel Gillet (FRA)

Pakistan
Saleem Sherwani, Munawwaruz Zaman, Saeed Ahmed, Muhammad Shafiq, Rana Ehsanullah, Akhtar Rasool, Islahuddin Siddiquee, Hanif Khan, Manzoor Hussain, Shahnaz Sheikh, Samiullah Khan

Netherlands
Maarten Sikking, André Bolhuis, Imbert Jebbink, Geert van Eijk, Hans Jorritsma, Ties Kruize, Theo Doyer, Ron Steens, Paul Litjens, Tim Steens, Wouter Leefers

1978 Hockey World Cup winner

Pakistan
Second title

== Final standings ==
Pos	Team	Pld	W	D	L	GF	GA	GD	Pts	Final result
1st place, gold medalist(s)	Pakistan	8	8	0	0	35	4	+31	16	Gold medal
2nd place, silver medalist(s)	Netherlands	8	6	0	2	26	14	+12	12	Silver medal
3rd place, bronze medalist(s)	Australia	8	6	0	2	24	13	+11	12	Bronze medal
4	West Germany	8	3	2	3	28	18	+10	8	
5	Spain	8	5	1	2	11	5	+6	11	
6	India	8	4	1	3	11	16	−5	9	
7	England	8	2	3	3	11	10	+1	7	
8	Argentina	8	2	2	4	12	18	−6	6	
9	Poland	8	3	1	4	17	25	−8	7	
10	Malaysia	8	2	2	4	9	11	−2	6	
11	Canada	8	2	2	4	15	19	−4	6	
12	Ireland	8	1	2	5	10	23	−13	4	
13	Italy	7	1	0	6	3	29	−26	2	
14	Belgium	7	1	2	4	13	20	−7	4	

Source: FIH

== Goalscorers ==
There were 225 goals scored in 55 matches, for an average of 4.09 goals per match.

15 goals

- (Netherlands) Paul Litjens

14 goals

- (West Germany) Wolfgang Strodter

12 goals

- (Australia) Ian Cooke

8 goals

- (England) Stephen Long

7 goals

- (Canada) Alan Hobkirk

6 goals

- (Argentina) Marcelo Garraffo
- (Pakistan) Manzoor Hussain
- (Pakistan) Shahnaz Sheikh
- (Pakistan) Islahuddin Siddiquee

5 goals

- (Belgium) Guy Miserque
- (Canada) Kelvin Wood
- (Ireland) Terence Gregg
- (Malaysia) Avtar Singh Gill
- (Pakistan) Hanif Khan
- (Pakistan) Munawwar uz Zaman
- (West Germany) Heiner Dopp
- (West Germany) Rainer Seifert

4 goals

- (Poland) Józef Wybieralski

3 goals

- (Australia) David Bell
- (Australia) Gregory Browning
- (Belgium) Michel van Tuyckom
- (India) Victor Philips
- (India) Surinder Singh
- (Ireland) Norman McGladdery
- (Malaysia) Sri Shanmuganathan
- (Netherlands) Ties Kruize
- (Pakistan) Rana Ehsanullah
- (Poland) Krystian Bąk
- (Poland) Jacek Merlinger
- (Poland) Zbigniew Rachwalski

2 goals

- (Argentina) Jorge Sabbione
- (Australia) Richard Charlesworth
- (Australia) Rowan Dick
- (Belgium) Philippe Verdussen
- (Canada) Paul Chohan
- (England) David Whitaker
- (India) Ashok Kumar
- (India) Baldev Singh
- (Ireland) Jonathan Douglas
- (Italy) Luigi Carta
- (Netherlands) Theodoor Doyer
- (Netherlands) Wouter Leefers
- (Netherlands) Ronaldus Steens
- (Pakistan) Samiullah Khan
- (Pakistan) Akhtar Rasool
- (Spain) Jaime Arbós
- (Spain) Jorge Fábregas
- (West Germany) Peter Trump

1 goal

- (Argentina) Ernesto Barreiros
- (Argentina) Jorge Disera
- (Argentina) Alfredo Quaquarini
- (Argentina) Jorge Ruiz
- (Australia) Barry Dancer
- (Australia) Stephen Smith
- (Belgium) Jean-Claude Moraux
- (Belgium) Armand Solie
- (Belgium) Phillippe van Strydonck
- (Canada) Frederick Hoos
- (England) Robert Smith
- (India) Vasudevan Baskaran
- (Italy) Renzo Pupatti
- (Malaysia) K Rajan
- (Netherlands) André Bolhuis
- (Netherlands) Thomas van 't Hek
- (Poland) Marek Kruś
- (Poland) Andrzej Myśliwiec
- (Poland) Andrzej Wybieralski
- (Poland) Jerzy Wybieralski
- (Spain) Juan Amat
- (Spain) Miguel Chaves
- (Spain) Francisco Fábregas
- (Spain) Rafael Garralda
- (Spain) Paulino Monsalve
- (Spain) Juan Pellón
- (Spain) Francisco Segura
- (West Germany) Hans Montag
- (West Germany) Michael Peter

Source: FIH
