= 2000 Men's Field Hockey Olympic Qualifier =

Qualification for the 1996 Summer Olympics

Tournament details
- Host country: Japan
- City: Osaka
- Dates: 9–20 March
- Teams: 8

Final positions
- Champions: Spain
- Runner-up: Pakistan
- Third place: South Korea

Tournament statistics
- Matches played: 42
- Goals scored: 224 (5.33 per match)
- Top scorer: (Pakistan) Sohail Abbas (13 goals)

The 2000 Men's Olympic Qualifier was a field hockey tournament held in Osaka, Japan, from 9–20 March 2000.

Twelve nations competed at the tournament, with the top seven earning qualification to the 2000 Summer Olympics in Sydney.

== Results ==
=== Preliminary round ===
==== Pool A ====
Pos	Team	Pld	W	D	L	GF	GA	GD	Pts	Status
1	South Korea	5	5	0	0	20	6	+14	15	Advanced to Semi-finals
2	Poland	5	3	0	2	11	10	+1	9	Advanced to Semi-finals
3	Japan (H)	5	2	1	2	10	12	−2	7	
4	Great Britain	5	2	1	2	13	16	−3	7	
5	New Zealand	5	1	1	3	10	15	−5	4	
6	Belgium	5	0	1	4	12	17	−5	1	

Source: Todor66
Rules for classification: 1) Points; 2) Goal difference; 3) Matches won; 4) Goals for; 5) Head-to-head result.
(H) Hosts

9 March 2000
10:05

Great Britain	4–2	Japan
Giles 25', 29', 41'; Sharpe 28'		Takahashi 3'; Fukazawa 70'

Umpires:
Eduardo Ruiz (ARG)
Murray Grime (AUS)

9 March 2000
12:05

Belgium	1–2	South Korea
Gierts 43'		Kang K. 57'; Hwang 59'

Umpires:
Pedro Teixeira (POR)
Amarjit Singh (MAS)

10 March 2000
10:05

Great Britain	2–2	New Zealand
Bertram 27'; Hall 60'		Leaver 34'; Burrows 69'

Umpires:
Steve Horgan (USA)
Eduardo Ruiz (ARG)

10 March 2000
14:05

South Korea	4–1	Poland
Hwang 11'; Yeo 21'; Ji 61'; Song 70'		Gaczkowski 42'

Umpires:
Xavier Adell (ESP)
John Wright (RSA)

11 March 2000
10:05

New Zealand	5–4	Belgium
Leaver 34'; Archibald 41'; Smith 44'; Parag 56'; Reynolds 62'		Dewamme 7'; Vandergracht 16', 30'; J. Beunen 49'

Umpires:
Amarjit Singh (MAS)
Pedro Teixeira (POR)

11 March 2000
12:35

Poland	0–2	Japan
		Iwata 6'; Yamabori 58'

Umpires:
Xavier Adell (ESP)
Roger St Rose (TRI)

12 March 2000
12:05

Great Britain	1–4	South Korea
Woods 16'		Yeo 18'; Kang K. 45', 46'; Kim J. 54'

Umpires:
Steve Horgan (USA)
Pedro Teixeira (POR)

13 March 2000
14:05

Japan	2–0	New Zealand
Yamabori 17'; Tobita 38'

Umpires:
Amarjit Singh (MAS)
John Wright (RSA)

13 March 2000
16:05

Belgium	1–3	Poland
Khopolov 51'		P. Mikula 20'; Malecki 33'; Juszczak 67'

Umpires:
Xavier Adell (ESP)
Eduardo Ruiz (ARG)

14 March 2000
14:05

Japan	1–5	South Korea
Iwata 24'		Kim J. 13'; Hwang 34'; Song 39'; Jeon 61'; Yeo 67'

Umpires:
Steve Horgan (USA)
Eduardo Ruiz (ARG)

14 March 2000
16:05

Poland	5–2	Great Britain
P. Mikula 4', 43', 50', 55', 70'		Giles 53'; Parnham 63'

Umpires:
Xavier Adell (ESP)
Amarjit Singh (MAS)

15 March 2000
14:05

South Korea	5–2	New Zealand
Kang K. 24'; Yeo 30'; Jeon 45', 49'; Lee J. 59'		Reynolds 44'; Hari 61'

Umpires:
Xavier Adell (ESP)
Peter Elders (NED)

15 March 2000
16:05

Great Britain	4–3	Belgium
Pearn 11', 26'; Sharpe 49'; Hall 66'		Coudron 48', 65'; Dewamme 69'

Umpires:
Pedro Teixeira (POR)
Murray Grime (AUS)

16 March 2000
14:05

New Zealand	1–2	Poland
Archibald 56'		Wybieralski 29', 64'

Umpires:
Pedro Teixeira (POR)
Eduardo Ruiz (ARG)

16 March 2000
16:05

Belgium	3–3	Japan
De Chaffoy 1'; J. Beunen 8'; Vandergracht 28'		Takahashi 18'; Katayama 64', 66'

Umpires:
Peter Elders (NED)
Amarjit Singh (MAS)

==== Pool B ====
Pos	Team	Pld	W	D	L	GF	GA	GD	Pts	Status
1	Spain	5	4	1	0	25	8	+17	13	Advanced to Semi-finals
2	Pakistan	5	3	1	1	25	13	+12	10	Advanced to Semi-finals
3	Argentina	5	2	1	2	18	16	+2	7	
4	Malaysia	5	2	1	2	18	19	−1	7	
5	Switzerland	5	2	0	3	10	16	−6	6	
6	Belarus	5	0	0	5	2	26	−24	0	

Source: Todor66
Rules for classification: 1) Points; 2) Goal difference; 3) Matches won; 4) Goals for; 5) Head-to-head result.

9 March 2000
14:05

Spain	7–1	Malaysia
Dinarés 12'; Tubau 21'; Ribas 29', 38'; Pa. Amat 32', 43'; Sánchez 44'	Report	Kuhan 15'

Umpires:
Steve Horgan (USA)
Peter Elders (NED)

9 March 2000
16:05

Argentina	1–3	Switzerland
Lombi 55'	Report	Overhoff 25', 60'; Cavallet 67'

Umpires:
Jason McCracken (NZL)
Keith Roper (ENG)

10 March 2000
14:05

Belarus	1–7	Malaysia
Pakhalchouk 38'	Report	Mirnawan 5'; Kuhan 10'; Ibrahim 22', 54', 69'; Kaliswaran 63'; Chairil 66'

Umpires:
Toshimichi Fujimura (JPN)
Peter Elders (NED)

10 March 2000
16:05

Pakistan	7–3	Switzerland
Ashraf 23'; Jawwad 37'; Sarwar 39'; Anis 43', 48'; Abbas 64', 69'	Report	Grandchamp 4'; Steinemann 20'; Bilgerig 51'

Umpires:
Han Jin-Soo (KOR)
Keith Roper (ENG)

11 March 2000
15:05

Belarus	0–6	Argentina
	Report	Lombi 9', 45', 65', 66'; Capurro 24'; Almada 29'

Umpires:
Murray Grime (AUS)
John Wright (RSA)

11 March 2000
17:35

Spain	4–4	Pakistan
Dinarés 17'; Ribas 33', 34'; Tubau 62'	Report	Abbas 4', 8', 26', 41'

Umpires:
Han Jin-Soo (KOR)
Jason McCracken (NZL)

12 March 2000
14:05

Argentina	4–4	Malaysia
Lombi 2', 26', 25'; M. Vila 41'	Report	Chairil 13'; Kuhan 33', 64'; Saiful 52'

Umpires:
Han Jin-Soo (KOR)
Murray Grime (AUS)

12 March 2000
16:05

Switzerland	0–3	Spain
	Report	Arnau 8'; Dinarés 11'; Pa. Amat 21'

Umpires:
Jason McCracken (NZL)
Peter Elders (NED)

13 March 2000
12:05

Pakistan	6–0	Belarus
Nadeem 3'; Abbas 21', 25', 40'; Jawwad 55'; Raza 69'	Report

Umpires:
Toshimichi Fujimura (JPN)
Roger St. Rose (TTO)

14 March 2000
10:05

Switzerland	2–4	Malaysia
Grandchamp 52', 67'	Report	Keevan 21'; Kuhan 47'; Mirnawan 54'; Ibrahim 64'

Umpires:
Murray Grime (AUS)
John Wright (RSA)

14 March 2000
12:05

Argentina	3–6	Spain
M. Vila 35'; R. Vila 44'; Lombi 47'	Report	Sánchez 6'; Po. Amat 50', 65'; Tubau 55', 58'; Arnau 70'

Umpires:
Han Jin-Soo (KOR)
Keith Roper (ENG)

15 March 2000
10:05

Malaysia	2–5	Pakistan
Mirnawan 48'; Kuhan 64'	Report	Nadeem 22', 63'; Jawwad 40'; Sarwar 61'; Yousaf 67'

Umpires:
John Wright (RSA)
Keith Roper (ENG)

15 March 2000
12:05

Spain	5–0	Belarus
Dinarés 2'; Tubau 24'; Po. Amat 28'; Fábregas 42'; Sánchez 69'	Report

Umpires:
Toshimichi Fujimura (JPN)
Jason McCracken (NZL)

16 March 2000
10:05

Pakistan	3–4	Argentina
Abbas 11'; Anis 33'; Nadeem 67'	Report	Lombi 18'; Pellegrino 23'; Capurro 31', 46'

Umpires:
Jason McCracken (NZL)
Han Jin-Soo (KOR)

16 March 2000
12:05

Belarus	1–2	Switzerland
Klimovich 23'	Report	Bilgerig 13'; Grandchamp 27'

Umpires:
John Wright (RSA)
Keith Roper (ENG)

=== Classification round ===
==== Ninth to twelfth place classification ====
Crossover
19 March
New Zealand	6
Belarus	3
19 March
Switzerland	1
Belgium	6

Ninth Place
20 March
New Zealand	0
Belgium	1
Eleventh place
20 March
Belarus	1
Switzerland	4

===== Crossover =====
19 March 2000
10:05

New Zealand	6–3	Belarus
Parag 4'; Burrows 25'; Reynolds 28', 31'; Leaver 50'; Patel 69'	Report	Voityuk 44', 61'; Klimovich 25'

Umpires:
Toshimichi Fujimura (JPN)
Amarjit Singh (MAS)

19 March 2000
12:35

Switzerland	1–6	Belgium
Peny 30'	Report	J. Beunen 13', 24', 70'; Vandergracht 17'; Berger 54'; Collin 68'

Umpires:
Xavier Adell (ESP)
Pedro Teixeira (POR)

===== Eleventh and twelfth place =====
20 March 2000
10:05

Belarus	1–4	Switzerland
Klimovich 48'	Report	Steinemann 28'; Grandchamp 47', 56'; Peny 59'

Umpires:
Roger St. Rose (TTO)
Pedro Teixeira (POR)

===== Ninth and tenth place =====
20 March 2000
12:35

New Zealand	0–1	Belgium
	Report	J. Beunen 22'

Umpires:
Toshimichi Fujimura (JPN)
Xavier Adell (ESP)

==== Fifth to eighth place classification ====
Crossover
18 March
Japan	1
Malaysia	2
18 March
Argentina	1
Great Britain	3

Fifth Place
19 March
Malaysia	1
Great Britain	2
Seventh place
19 March
Japan	0
Argentina	1

===== Crossover =====
18 March 2000
10:05

Argentina	1–3	Great Britain
Pellegrino 58'	Report	Hall 8'; Giles 15', 42'

Umpires:
Jason McCracken (NZL)
Han Jin-Soo (KOR)

18 March 2000
12:35

Japan	1–2	Malaysia
Hokaze 6'	Report	Ibrahim 29'; Kuhan 65'

Umpires:
Murray Grime (AUS)
Keith Roper (ENG)

===== Seventh and eighth place =====
19 March 2000
15:05

Japan	0–1	Argentina
	Report	Pellegrino 15'

Umpires:
Murray Grime (AUS)
Keith Roper (ENG)

===== Fifth and sixth place =====
19 March 2000
17:35

Malaysia	1–2	Great Britain
Mirnawan 70'	Report	Giles 45'; Head 61'

Umpires:
Han Jin-Soo (KOR)
John Wright (RSA)

==== First to fourth place classification ====
Semi-finals
18 March
South Korea	1
Pakistan	3
18 March
Spain	4
Poland	1

Final
20 March
Pakistan	2
Spain	3
Third place
20 March
South Korea	2
Poland	1

===== Semi-finals =====
18 March 2000
15:05

South Korea	1–3	Pakistan
Jeon 44'	Report	Abbas 52'; Hussain 64', 70'

Umpires:
Peter Elders (NED)
John Wright (RSA)

18 March 2000
17:35

Spain	4–1	Poland
Po. Amat 37', 41'; Arnau 53'; Usoz 57'	Report	A. Mikula 61'

Umpires:
Eduardo Ruíz (ARG)
Amarjit Singh (MAS)

===== Third and fourth place =====
20 March 2000
15:05

South Korea	2–1	Poland
Hwang 13'; Kang K. 27'	Report	Grotowski 67'

Umpires:
Jason McCracken (NZL)
Murray Grime (AUS)

===== Final =====
20 March 2000
17:35

Pakistan	2–3	Spain
Abbas 43', 70'	Report	Tubau 17'; Ribas 34'; Arnau 57'

Umpires:
Jason McCracken (NZL)
Murray Grime (AUS)

== Final standings ==
As per statistical convention in field hockey, matches decided in extra time are counted as wins and losses, while matches decided by penalty shoot-outs are counted as draws.

Pos	Team	Pld	W	D	L	GF	GA	GD	Pts	Status
1st place, gold medalist(s)	Spain	7	6	1	0	32	11	+21	19	Qualified for 2000 Summer Olympics
2nd place, silver medalist(s)	Pakistan	7	4	1	2	30	17	+13	13	Qualified for 2000 Summer Olympics
3rd place, bronze medalist(s)	South Korea	7	6	0	1	23	10	+13	18	Qualified for 2000 Summer Olympics
4	Poland	7	3	0	4	13	16	−3	9	Qualified for 2000 Summer Olympics
5	Great Britain	7	4	1	2	18	18	0	13	Qualified for 2000 Summer Olympics
6	Malaysia	7	3	1	3	21	22	−1	10	Qualified for 2000 Summer Olympics
7	Argentina	7	3	1	3	20	19	+1	10	Qualified for 2000 Summer Olympics
8	Japan (H)	7	2	1	4	11	15	−4	7	
9	Belgium	7	2	1	4	19	18	+1	7	
10	New Zealand	7	2	1	4	16	19	−3	7	
11	Switzerland	7	3	0	4	15	23	−8	9	
12	Belarus	7	0	0	7	6	36	−30	0	

Source: Todor66
(H) Hosts

== Goalscorers ==
There were 224 goals scored in 42 matches, for an average of 5.33 goals per match.

13 goals

- (Pakistan) Sohail Abbas

10 goals

- (Argentina) Jorge Lombi

7 goals

- (United Kingdom) Calum Giles
- (Malaysia) Kuhan Shanmuganathan

6 goals

- (Belgium) Joeri Beunen
- (Poland) Piotr Mikula
- (Spain) Eduardo Tubau
- (Switzerland) Thierry Grandchamp

5 goals

- (Malaysia) Ibrahim Suhaimi
- (South Korea) Kang Keon-Wook
- (Spain) Pol Amat
- (Spain) Xavier Ribas

4 goals

- (Belgium) Erik Vandergracht
- (Malaysia) Mirnawan Nawawi
- (New Zealand) Craig Reynolds
- (Pakistan) Muhammad Nadeem
- (South Korea) Hwang Jong-Hyun
- (South Korea) Kim Jung-Chul
- (South Korea) Yeo Woon-Kon
- (Spain) Javier Arnau
- (Spain) Juan Dinarés

3 goals

- (Argentina) Santiago Capurro
- (Argentina) Maximo Pellegrino
- (Belarus) Stepan Klimovich
- (United Kingdom) Daniel Hall
- (New Zealand) Brett Leaver
- (Pakistan) Anis Ahmed
- (Pakistan) Kashif Jawwad
- (Spain) Pablo Amat
- (Spain) Josep Sánchez

2 goals

- (Argentina) Matías Vila
- (Belarus) Igor Voityuk
- (Belgium) Marc Coudron
- (Belgium) Gérald Dewamme
- (United Kingdom) Mark Pearn
- (United Kingdom) Benjamin Sharpe
- (Japan) Shinji Iwata
- (Japan) Kenichi Katayama
- (Japan) Akira Takahashi
- (Japan) Takahiko Yamabori
- (Malaysia) Chairil Anwar Abdul Aziz
- (New Zealand) Ryan Archibald
- (New Zealand) Phillip Burrows
- (New Zealand) Umesh Parag
- (Pakistan) Haider Hussain
- (Pakistan) Muhammad Sarwar
- (Poland) Krzysztof Wybieralski
- (South Korea) Jeon Hong-Kwon
- (South Korea) Song Seung-Tae
- (Switzerland) Olivier Bilgerig
- (Switzerland) Sacha Overhoff
- (Switzerland) Xavier Peny
- (Switzerland) Benjamin Steinemann

1 goal

- (Argentina) Mario Almada
- (Argentina) Rodrigo Vila
- (Belarus) Igor Pakhalchouk
- (Belgium) Fabian Berger
- (Belgium) Alexandre de Chaffoy
- (Belgium) Jean Collin
- (Belgium) Patrick Gierts
- (Belgium) Vitali Khopolov
- (United Kingdom) Thomas Bertram
- (United Kingdom) Stuart Head
- (United Kingdom) Craig Parnham
- (United Kingdom) Duncan Woods
- (Japan) Shuji Fukazawa
- (Japan) Daisuke Hokaze
- (Japan) Naohiko Tobita
- (Malaysia) Kaliswaran Muniandy
- (Malaysia) Nor Saiful Nasiruddin
- (Malaysia) Keevan Raj
- (New Zealand) Bevan Hari
- (New Zealand) Mitesh Patel
- (New Zealand) Darren Smith
- (Pakistan) Kamran Ashraf
- (Pakistan) Ali Raza
- (Pakistan) Imran Yousaf
- (Poland) Eugeniusz Gaczkowski
- (Poland) Rafal Grotowski
- (Poland) Zbigniew Juszczak
- (Poland) Dariusz Malecki
- (Poland) Artur Mikula
- (South Korea) Lee Jung-Seon
- (South Korea) Ji Seung-Hwan
- (Spain) Francisco Fábregas Monegal
- (Spain) Pablo Usoz
- (Switzerland) Christian Cavallet

== See also ==
- 2000 Women's Field Hockey Olympic Qualifier
