= Wybieralski =

Wybieralski is a Polish surname. Notable people with the surname include:

- Jerzy Wybieralski (born 1954), Polish field hockey player
- Józef Wybieralski (born 1946), Polish field hockey player
- Krzysztof Wybieralski (born 1972), Polish field hockey player
- Łukasz Wybieralski, Polish field hockey player
