= Field hockey at the 2000 Summer Olympics – Men's tournament =

Men's field hockey at 2000 Summer Olympics
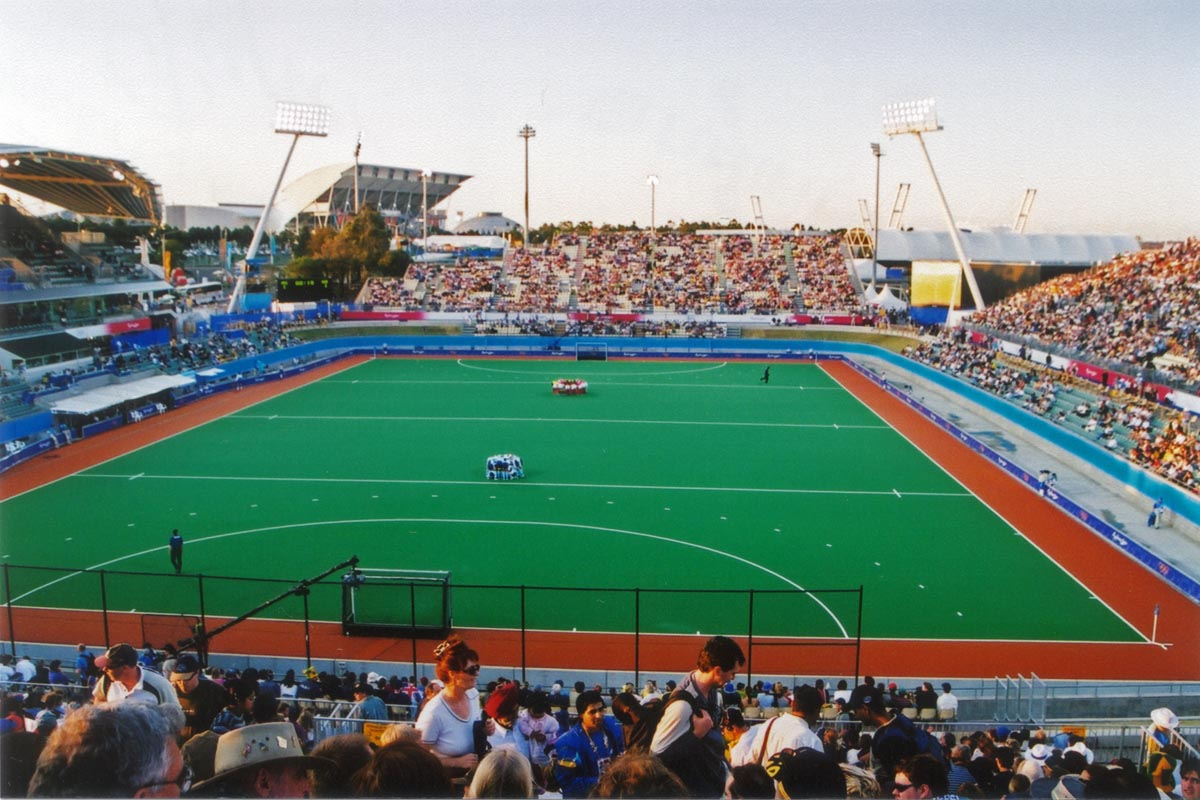
- Sydney Olympic Park Hockey Centre

Tournament details
- Host country: Australia
- City: Sydney
- Dates: 16–30 September
- Teams: 12 (from 4 confederations)
- Venue: Sydney Olympic Park Hockey Centre

Final positions
- Champions: Netherlands (2nd title)
- Runner-up: South Korea
- Third place: Australia

Tournament statistics
- Matches played: 42
- Goals scored: 164 (3.9 per match)
- Top scorer: (Argentina) Jorge Lombi (13 goals)

The men's field hockey tournament at the 2000 Summer Olympics was the 19th edition of the field hockey event for men at the Summer Olympic Games. It was held over a fifteen-day period beginning on 16 September, and culminating with the medal finals on 30 September. All games were played at the hockey centre within the Olympic Park in Sydney, Australia.

Defending champions the Netherlands won the gold medal for the second time after defeating South Korea 5–4 in the final on penalty strokes after a 3–3 draw. Australia won the bronze medal by defeating Pakistan 6–3.

== Qualification ==
Each of the continental champions from five federations and the host nation received an automatic berth. The European federation received one extra quota based upon the FIH World Rankings. Alongside the teams qualifying through the Olympic Qualification Tournament, twelve teams competed in this tournament.

Dates	Event	Location	Qualifier(s)
Host nation			Australia
9–19 December 1998	1998 Asian Games	Bangkok, Thailand	India
13–16 June 1999	1999 Oceania Cup	Brisbane, Australia	—^{2}
24 July – 4 August 1999	1999 Pan American Games	Winnipeg, Canada	Canada
1–12 September 1999	1999 EuroHockey Nations Championship	Padua, Italy	Germany; Netherlands
11–18 September 1999	1999 All-Africa Games	Johannesburg, South Africa	—^{1}
9–20 March 2000	Olympic Qualification Tournament	Osaka, Japan	Spain; Pakistan; South Korea; Poland; Great Britain; Malaysia; Argentina^{1}

^1 – South Africa qualified but gave up their automatic berth on the premise that there weren't enough black players in the team. Argentina took their place as the 7th ranked team at the Olympic Qualification Tournament.
^2 – Australia qualified both as host and continental champion, therefore that quota was added to the ones awarded by the 2000 Men's Field Hockey Olympic Qualifier to a total of 6.

== Preliminary round ==
All times are Eastern Daylight Time (UTC+11:00)

=== Pool A ===
Pos	Team	Pld	W	D	L	GF	GA	GD	Pts	Qualification
1	Pakistan	5	2	3	0	15	6	+9	9	Semi-finals
2	Netherlands	5	2	2	1	11	8	+3	8	Semi-finals
3	Germany	5	2	2	1	7	6	+1	8	
4	Great Britain	5	1	2	2	8	16	−8	5	
5	Malaysia	5	0	4	1	5	6	−1	4	
6	Canada	5	0	3	2	7	11	−4	3	

Source: FIH

16 September 2000
13:30

Netherlands	4–2	Great Britain
De Nooijer 9'; Brinkman 43'; Veen 50', 69'	Report	Pearn 15'; Wallis 46'

Umpires:
Steven Horgan (USA)
Santiago Deo (ESP)

16 September 2000
18:30

Canada	2–2	Pakistan
Pereira 5'; Campbell 22'	Report	Ashraf 16'; Abbas 34'

Umpires:
Han Jin-soo (KOR)
Donald Prior (AUS)

16 September 2000
20:30

Malaysia	0–1	Germany
	Report	Emmerling 43'

Umpires:
Eduardo Ruiz (ARG)
Henrik Ehlers (DEN)

18 September 2000
10:30

Netherlands	0–0	Malaysia
	Report

Umpires:
Henrik Ehlers (DEN)
John Wright (RSA)

18 September 2000
13:30

Great Britain	1–8	Pakistan
Pearn 20'	Report	Abbas 7', 10', 31'; Nadeem 19', 70+'; Bashir 51', 55'; Sarwar 62'

Umpires:
Ray O'Connor (IRL)
Eric Denis (BEL)

18 September 2000
15:30

Germany	2–1	Canada
Michel 62'; Moissl 68'	Report	Kullar 61'

Umpires:
Santiago Deo (ESP)
Murray Grime (AUS)

20 September 2000
13:30

Netherlands	5–2	Canada
De Nooijer 12', 64'; Lomans 35+'; Veen 41'; Van Wijk 51'	Report	Pereira 18'; Milkovich 45'

Umpires:
Murray Grime (AUS)
Han Jin-soo (KOR)

20 September 2000
15:30

Malaysia	2–2	Great Britain
Nor Saiful 59'; Keevan 66'	Report	Parnham 18'; Pearn 27'

Umpires:
Eduardo Ruiz (ARG)
Donald Prior (AUS)

21 September 2000
15:30

Germany	1–1	Pakistan
Domke 19'	Report	Abbas 30'

Umpires:
Henrik Ehlers (DEN)
Santiago Deo (ESP)

23 September 2000
13:30

Malaysia	2–2	Pakistan
Suhaimi 21', 63'	Report	Bashir 24'; Abbas 70+'

Umpires:
Murray Grime (AUS)
Ray O'Connor (IRL)

23 September 2000
20:30

Germany	2–2	Netherlands
Michel 31'; Moissl 35+'	Report	Veen 3'; De Nooijer 20'

Umpires:
Eduardo Ruiz (ARG)
Steven Horgan (USA)

24 September 2000
19:00

Great Britain	1–1	Canada
Hall 44'	Report	Pereira 4'

Umpires:
Eduardo Ruiz (ARG)
Henrik Ehlers (DEN)

26 September 2000
10:30

Malaysia	1–1	Canada
Chairil 59'	Report	Milkovich 27'

Umpires:
Jason McCracken (NZL)
Eduardo Ruiz (ARG)

26 September 2000
15:30

Netherlands	0–2	Pakistan
	Report	Abbas 22'; Jawad 67'

Umpires:
Santiago Deo (ESP)
Han Jin-soo (KOR)

26 September 2000
18:30

Germany	1–2	Great Britain
Mayerhöfer 37'	Report	Parnham 41'; Giles 65'

Umpires:
Henrik Ehlers (DEN)
John Wright (RSA)

=== Pool B ===
Pos	Team	Pld	W	D	L	GF	GA	GD	Pts	Qualification
1	Australia (H)	5	3	2	0	12	6	+6	11	Semi-finals
2	South Korea	5	2	2	1	9	7	+2	8	Semi-finals
3	India	5	2	2	1	9	7	+2	8	
4	Argentina	5	1	2	2	13	13	0	5	
5	Poland	5	1	2	2	12	14	−2	5	
6	Spain	5	0	2	3	7	15	−8	2	

Source: FIH
(H) Hosts

16 September 2000
15:30

Spain	1–1	South Korea
Amat 2'	Report	Song 29'

Umpires:
Peter von Reth (NED)
Sumesh Putra (CAN)

17 September 2000
08:30

Australia	4–0	Poland
Elmer 34', 52'; Stacy 47'; Brennan 58'	Report

Umpires:
Christian Siebrecht (GER)
Jason McCracken (NZL)

17 September 2000
10:30

Argentina	0–3	India
	Report	Dad 25', 60'; Nandnoori 35+'

Umpires:
Amarjit Singh (MAS)
Richard Wolter (GER)

19 September 2000
10:30

Spain	1–4	Poland
Arnau 51'	Report	Grzeszczak 15'; Mikuła 16', 38'; Grotowski 28'

Umpires:
Amarjit Singh (MAS)
Steven Horgan (USA)

19 September 2000
18:30

Argentina	2–2	South Korea
Lombi 5', 67'	Report	Yeo 7'; Ji 63'

Umpires:
Sumesh Putra (CAN)
Richard Wolter (GER)

19 September 2000
20:30

Australia	2–2	India
Stacy 5'; Victory 51'	Report	Nandnoori 1'; B. Singh 25'

Umpires:
Peter von Roth (NED)
Christian Siebrecht (GER)

21 September 2000
08:30

South Korea	2–0	India
Song 28'; Kang 42'	Report

Umpires:
Ray O'Connor (IRL)
Peter von Roth (NED)

21 September 2000
10:30

Argentina	5–5	Poland
Lombi 6', 23', 41', 63'; Capurro 66'	Report	L. Wybieralski 31'; Mikuła 45', 51'; Jakubiak 60'; Grotowski 67'

Umpires:
Jason McCracken (NZL)
Sumesh Putra (CAN)

21 September 2000
13:30

Spain	2–2	Australia
Amat 12'; Arnau 36'	Report	Davies 8'; Commens 40'

Umpires:
John Wright (RSA)
Steven Horgan (USA)

23 September 2000
15:30

Spain	2–3	India
Ribas 22'; Sanchez 48'	Report	B. Singh 16', 43'; Tirkey 35+'

Umpires:
Sumesh Putra (CAN)
Christian Siebrecht (GER)

23 September 2000
18:30

Australia	2–1	Argentina
Sproule 56'; Brennan 62'	Report	Lombi 54'

Umpires:
Peter von Roth (NED)
Eric Denis (BEL)

24 September 2000
21:00

Poland	2–3	South Korea
Grotowski 53'; Mikuła 62'	Report	Yeo 11'; Kang 18'; Hwang 37'

Umpires:
Christian Siebrecht (GER)
Jason McCracken (NZL)

25 September 2000
08:30

Spain	1–5	Argentina
Ribas 5'	Report	Lombi 23', 45', 66'; M. Vila 54'; Almada 57'

Umpires:
Ray O'Connor (IRL)
Amarjit Singh (MAS)

26 September 2000
13:30

Australia	2–1	South Korea
Victory 35+'; Stacy 62'	Report	Song 8'

Umpires:
Peter von Roth (NED)
Richard Wolter (GER)

26 September 2000
20:30

Poland	1–1	India
Cichy 69'	Report	Tirkey 53'

Umpires:
Eric Denis (BEL)
Christian Siebrecht (GER)

== Classification round ==
=== Ninth to twelfth place classification ===
Crossover
27 September
Malaysia	0
Spain	1
27 September
Canada	3
Poland	2

Ninth place
30 September
Spain	3
Canada	0
Eleventh place
30 September
Malaysia (a.e.t.)	3
Poland	2

==== Crossover ====
27 September 2000
20:30

Malaysia	0–1	Spain
	Report	Amat 62'

Umpires:
Steven Horgan (USA)
John Wright (RSA)

28 September 2000
17:30

Canada	3–2	Poland
Gifford 37'; Wettlaufer 39'; Bird 59'	Report	K. Wybieralski 23'; Gaczkowski 45'

Umpires:
Henrik Ehlers (DEN)
Amrjit Singh (MAS)

==== Eleventh and twelfth place ====
30 September 2000
11:30

Malaysia	3–2 (a.e.t.)	Poland
Mirnawan 5'; Nor Saiful 48'; Kuhan 73'	Report	L. Wybieralski 17'; Jakubiak 52'

Umpires:
Henrik Ehlers (DEN)
Murray Grime (AUS)

==== Ninth and tenth place ====
30 September 2000
14:00

Spain	3–0	Canada
Ribas 6'; Tubau 19'; Escarré 56'	Report

Umpires:
Richard Wolter (GER)
Eric Denis (BEL)

=== Fifth to eighth place classification ===
Crossover
28 September
Great Britain	2
India	1
28 September
Germany	6
Argentina	2

Fifth place
29 September
Great Britain	0
Germany	4
Seventh place
29 September
India	3
Argentina	1

==== Crossover ====
28 September 2000
09:00

Great Britain	2–1	India
Parnham 16'; Giles 46'	Report	Tirkey 10'

Umpires:
Jason McCracken (NZL)
Sumesh Putra (CAN)

28 September 2000
11:30

Germany	6–2	Argentina
Domke 40'; Emmerling 42'; Bechmann 44', 64'; Michel 66', 70+'	Report	Lombi 13', 14'

Umpires:
Ray O'Connor (IRL)
Han Jin-soo (KOR)

==== Seventh and eighth place ====
29 September 2000
11:30

India	3–1	Argentina
Thakur 30'; Gill 47'; Pillay 63'	Report	Lombi 52'

Umpires:
Richard Wolter (GER)
Murray Grime (AUS)

==== Fifth and sixth place ====
29 September 2000
14:00

Great Britain	0–4	Germany
	Report	Michel 28'; Domke 31'; Bechmann 59'; Weißenborn 63'

Umpires:
Steven Horgan (USA)
Jason McCracken (NZL)

== Medal round ==
Semi-finals
28 September
Pakistan	0
South Korea	1
28 September
Netherlands (pen.)	0 (5)
Australia	0 (4)

Gold medal match
30 September
South Korea	3 (4)
Netherlands (pen.)	3 (5)
Bronze medal match
30 September
Pakistan	3
Australia	6

==== Semi-finals ====
28 September 2000
14:00

Pakistan	0–1	South Korea
	Report	Song 57'

Umpires:
Peter von Reth (NED)
Christian Siebrecht (GER)

28 September 2000
20:00

Netherlands	0–0 (a.e.t.)	Australia
	Report
Penalties
Lomas (penalty shoot-out scored); Van Pelt (penalty shoot-out scored); Geeris (penalty shoot-out scored); Veen (penalty shoot-out scored); Eikelboom (penalty shoot-out scored)	5–4	(penalty shoot-out scored) Brennan; (penalty shoot-out scored) Elder; (penalty shoot-out scored) Commens; (penalty shoot-out scored) Elmer; (penalty shoot-out missed) Livermore

Umpires:
Santiago Deo (ESP)
Eduardo Ruiz (ARG)

==== Bronze medal match ====
30 September 2000
17:30

Pakistan	3–6	Australia
Bashir 6'; Abbas 46'; Javad 70+'	Report	Elder 3', 8', 60'; Davies 30'; Elmer 49'; Brennan 66'

Umpires:
Peter von Roth (NED)
Eduardo Ruiz (ARG)

==== Gold medal match ====
30 September 2000
20:00

South Korea	3–3 (a.e.t.)	Netherlands
Song 9'; Kim K. 66'; Kang 66'	Report	Veen 20', 36', 64'
Penalties
Jeon J. (penalty shoot-out scored); Yeo (penalty shoot-out scored); Song (penalty shoot-out missed); Kim K. (penalty shoot-out scored); Kang (penalty shoot-out scored)	4–5	(penalty shoot-out scored) Lomans; (penalty shoot-out scored) Geeris; (penalty shoot-out scored) Van Pelt; (penalty shoot-out scored) Eikelboom; (penalty shoot-out scored) Veen

Umpires:
Christian Siebrecht (GER)
Santiago Deo (ESP)

== Final rankings ==
As per statistical convention in field hockey, matches decided in regular time are counted as wins and losses, while matches decided by penalty shoot-outs are counted as draws.

Pos	Team	Pld	W	D	L	GF	GA	GD	Pts	Final result
1st place, gold medalist(s)	Netherlands	7	2	4	1	14	11	+3	10	Gold Medal
2nd place, silver medalist(s)	South Korea	7	3	3	1	13	10	+3	12	Silver Medal
3rd place, bronze medalist(s)	Australia (H)	7	4	3	0	18	9	+9	15	Bronze Medal
4	Pakistan	7	2	3	2	18	13	+5	9	Fourth place
5	Germany	7	4	2	1	17	8	+9	14	Eliminated in group stage
6	Great Britain	7	2	2	3	10	21	−11	8	Eliminated in group stage
7	India	7	3	2	2	13	10	+3	11	Eliminated in group stage
8	Argentina	7	1	2	4	16	22	−6	5	Eliminated in group stage
9	Spain	7	2	2	3	11	15	−4	8	Eliminated in group stage
10	Canada	7	1	3	3	10	16	−6	6	Eliminated in group stage
11	Malaysia	7	1	4	2	8	9	−1	7	Eliminated in group stage
12	Poland	7	1	2	4	16	20	−4	5	Eliminated in group stage

Source: FIH
(H) Hosts

== Goalscorers ==
There were 164 goals scored in 42 matches, for an average of 3.9 goals per match.

13 goals

- (Argentina) Jorge Lombi

8 goals

- (Pakistan) Sohail Abbas

7 goals

- (Netherlands) Stephan Veen

5 goals

- (Germany) Björn Michel
- (Poland) Piotr Mikuła
- (South Korea) Song Seung-Tae

4 goals

- (Netherlands) Teun de Nooijer
- (Pakistan) Atif Bashir

3 goals

- (Australia) Michael Brennan
- (Australia) Troy Elder
- (Australia) James Elmer
- (Australia) Jay Stacy
- (Canada) Kenneth Pereira
- (Germany) Christoph Bechmann
- (Germany) Oliver Domke
- (United Kingdom) Craig Parnham
- (United Kingdom) Mark Pearn
- (India) Baljit Singh Dhillon
- (India) Dilip Tirkey
- (Poland) Rafał Grotowski
- (South Korea) Kang Keon-Wook
- (Spain) Pol Amat
- (Spain) Xavier Ribas

2 goals

- (Australia) Stephen Davies
- (Australia) Craig Victory
- (Canada) Peter Milkovich
- (Germany) Björn Emmerling
- (Germany) Ulrich Moissl
- (United Kingdom) Calum Giles
- (India) Sameer Dad
- (India) Mukesh Nandanoori
- (Malaysia) Ibrahim Suhaimi Ibrahim
- (Malaysia) Nor Saiful Zaini
- (Pakistan) Kashif Jawad
- (Pakistan) Muhammad Nadeem
- (Poland) Paweł Jakubiak
- (Poland) Łukasz Wybieralski
- (South Korea) Yeo Woon-Kon
- (Spain) Javier Arnau

1 goal

- (Argentina) Mario Almada
- (Argentina) Santiago Capurro
- (Argentina) Matías Vila
- (Australia) Adam Commens
- (Australia) Daniel Sproule
- (Canada) Ian Bird
- (Canada) Sean Campbell
- (Canada) Christopher Gifford
- (Canada) Bindi Kullar
- (Canada) Paul Wettlaufer
- (Germany) Christian Mayerhöfer
- (Germany) Tibor Weißenborn
- (United Kingdom) Daniel Hall
- (United Kingdom) James Wallis
- (India) Sukhbir Singh Gill
- (India) Dhanraj Pillay
- (India) Deepak Thakur
- (Malaysia) Chairil Anwar Abdul Aziz
- (Malaysia) Mirnawan Nawawi
- (Malaysia) Keevan Raj
- (Malaysia) Kuhan Shanmuganathan
- (Netherlands) Jacques Brinkman
- (Netherlands) Bram Lomans
- (Netherlands) Remco van Wijk
- (Pakistan) Kamran Ashraf
- (Pakistan) Muhammad Sarwar
- (Poland) Tomasz Cichy
- (Poland) Eugeniusz Gaczkowski
- (Poland) Robert Grzeszczak
- (Poland) Krzysztof Wybieralski
- (South Korea) Hwang Jong-Hyun
- (South Korea) Kim Kyung-Seok
- (South Korea) Ji Seung-Hwan
- (Spain) Juan Escarré
- (Spain) Josep Sánchez
- (Spain) Eduardo Tubau

Source: FIH
