= 1978 India–Pakistan field hockey test series =

Bilateral field hockey matches

1978 India-Pakistan field hockey test series
Tournament details
- City: Mumbai, Bangalore, Karachi, Lahore
- Dates: 9–19 February 1978

Final positions
- Champions: Pakistan

Tournament statistics
- Matches played: 4

The 1978 India-Pakistan field hockey test series was the first series of bilateral field hockey matches between India and Pakistan. It was held between 9 and 19 February 1978 in the form of a four-test series and was played in two legs – first two in India and the remaining in Pakistan. Pakistan won the first three matches and India the last, the former winning the series 3–1. The Mumbai match of this test series is mentioned in the 1979 film Gol Maal.

== Background ==
National teams of India and Pakistan of any sport had not traveled to either countries since 1962 due to political tensions. In early January 1978, reports emerged that a field hockey test series between national teams of the two countries was being planned. Nur Khan, president of the Pakistan Hockey Federation, traveled to India on 13 January to finalise plans for the India leg of the series. Three Indian cities were scheduled to host Pakistan in the first leg of the series. The series was initially scheduled to be held between 23 January and 5 February. It was later reported that the series would commence on 9 February, and that Wankhede Stadium in Bombay (now Mumbai) would play host to the first of two matches of the India leg. 25,000 tickets were sold and the match was to be televised in Pakistan. Bangalore was chosen as the venue for the second match, to be played on 12 February.

The test series was arranged in preparation for the World Cup to be held in Argentina the following month. Leading up to the series, the two teams had played each other on 12 occasions, with Pakistan winning seven, losing four and one match ending in a draw. These results and Pakistan's recent form led them to being labeled favorites heading into the series. All matches were played on 'rock-hard pitches'.

== Squads ==
India	Pakistan
Victor Philips (c); Manuel Frederick; Olympio Fernandes; Gopal Bhengra; Sylvanus Dung Dung; Gurdishpal Singh; Robert Claudius; Mehboob Khan; Vasudevan Baskaran; John Kerketta; Charanjit Kumar; V. Prabhakaran; Sukhvir Singh Grewal; Vincent Lakra; Surinder Singh Sodhi; Zafar Iqbal	Islahuddin Siddique (c); Hanif Khan; Samiullah Khan; Shehnaz Sheikh; Manzoor Jr.; Manzoor-ul Hassan

On 20 January 1978, Islahuddin Siddique was named captain of the Pakistan team and Abdul Waheed, the manager of the touring squad. A 16-member India squad was announced on 1 February 1978. Victor Philips was named captain in the absence of six senior players who were excluded owing to a dispute with the hockey authorities. The players excluded were Varinder Singh, Baldev Singh, Surjit Singh Randhawa, Ashok Kumar, B. P. Govinda and Aslam Sher Khan.

== Matches ==
The first match resulted in a Pakistan victory by a 2–1 margin. They led 2–0 at half-time with Hanif Khan and Samiullah Khan scoring for them before Vasudevan Baskaran pulled one back for India in the 61st-minute with a penalty corner conversion.

The Pakistan leg began with another loss for India, this time by a 6–0 margin, at the National Stadium in Karachi. India fielded four unfit players, suffering from flu, and were down 3–0 after 27 minutes into the first half. Three more goals in the second half meant Pakistan secured an unassailable lead in the series. Shehnaz Sheikh and Manzoor Jr. each scored twice while captain Islahuddin Siddique and Samiullah Khan scored once for Pakistan. India took the final match 2–1 coming from behind after an early goal by Siddique. Zafar Iqbal scored the winning goal for the visitors, in the 54th minute. India's defence came into play with Gopal Bhengra and Sylvanus Dung Dung proving effective against the Pakistani attack.

=== First leg ===
9 February 1978

India	1–2	Pakistan
Baskaran 61'		H. Khan 28'; S. Khan ?'

Wankhede Stadium, Mumbai
Attendance: 40,000

12 February 1978

India	2–3	Pakistan
Baskaran; Philips

Bangalore Football Stadium

=== Second leg ===
16 February 1978

Pakistan	6–0	India
Sheikh 6', ?'; Manzoor Jr. ?', 40'; Siddique 28'; S. Khan ?'

National Stadium, Karachi

19 February 1978

Pakistan	1–2	India
Siddique 6'		Philips 8'; Iqbal 54'

Gaddafi Stadium, Lahore

== See also ==
- India–Pakistan field hockey test series
- Gol Maal (1979 film)
