= Sikking =

Sikking is a surname. Notable people with the surname include:

- Fred Sikking (born 1980), Dutch Muay Thai kickboxer
- James B. Sikking (1934–2024), American actor
- Konrad Sikking (born 1998), Dutch footballer
- Maarten Sikking (1948–2009), Dutch field hockey player
