= Wouter Leefers =

Dutch field hockey player

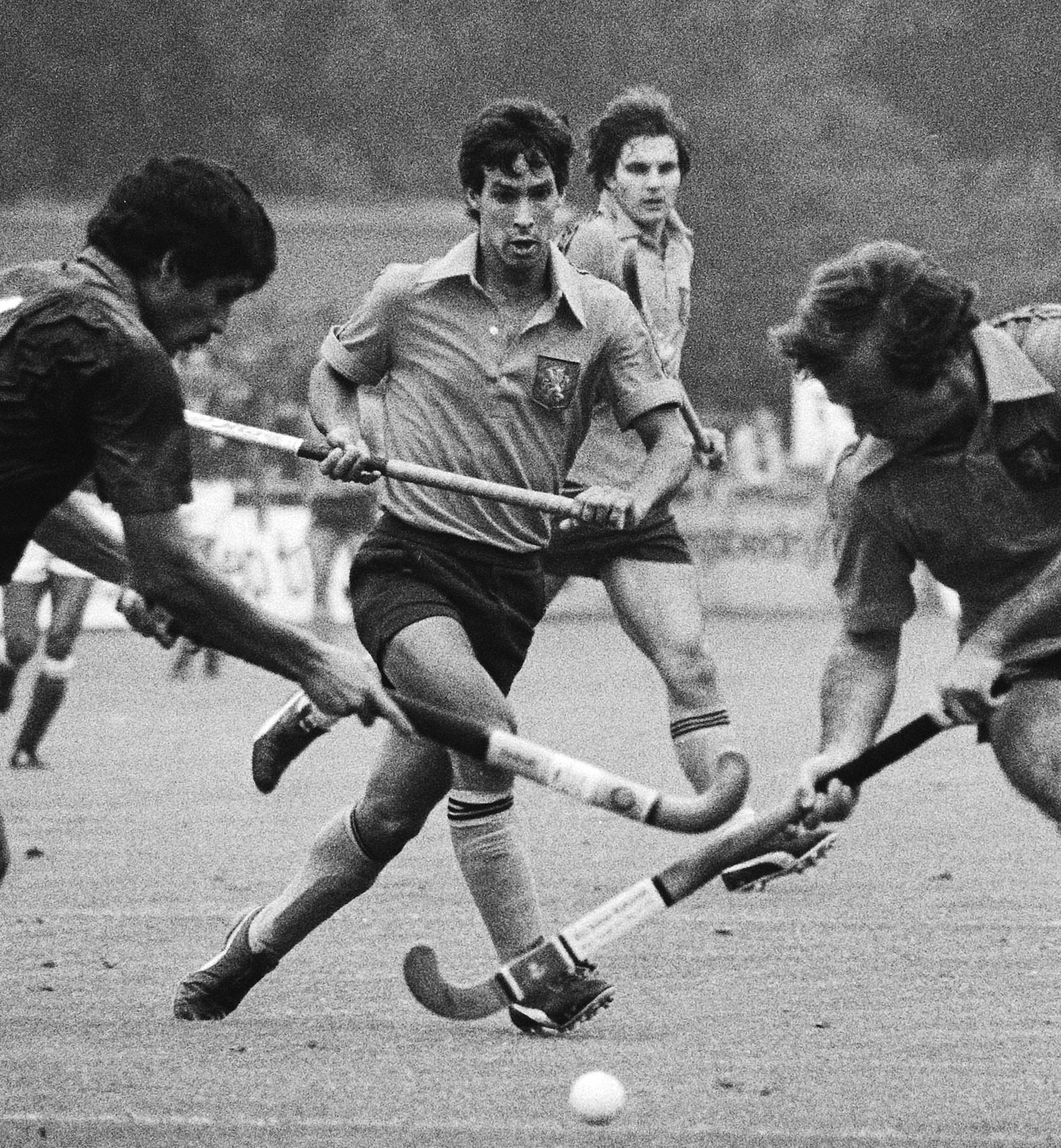
- Wouter Leefers (center) in 1979, with Ties Kruize behind him and Theo Doyer to the right

Personal information
- Born: 12 January 1953 (age 73) The Hague, the Netherlands
- Height: 1.70 m (5 ft 7 in)
- Weight: 65 kg (143 lb)

Sport
- Sport: Field hockey
- Club: HGC, Den Haag
Medal record
Representing the Netherlands
Hockey World Cup
| Gold medal – first place | 1973 Amstelveen | Team |
| Silver medal – second place | 1978 Buenos Aires | Team |
EuroHockey Nations Championship
| Bronze medal – third place | 1974 Madrid | Team |
| Silver medal – second place | 1978 Hannover | Team |

Wouter Leefers (born 12 January 1953) is a retired field hockey player from the Netherlands. He competed at the 1972 and 1976 Olympics, where his teams finished in fourth place on both occasions. He missed the 1980 Games which were boycotted by the Dutch Hockey Federation.

Between 1971 and 1982 Leefers played 156 international matches and scored 28 goals. He competed at the 1971, 1973, 1975, 1978 and 1982 World Cups and won a gold medal in 1973 and a silver in 1978.
