= India–Pakistan field hockey test series =

India and Pakistan have played test series from 1978 to 2006 as part of their long standing rivalry in field hockey. They played eight test series in this span out of which Pakistan won six, India won one and one was drawn. Out of 52 matches played Pakistan won 25, India won 16 and 11 were drawn. The goal aggregation so far is Pakistan 124 - 104 India). In 1998, each country hosted four matches out of which Pakistan won four, India won three and one was drawn. The last was played in 2006 with three matches in each nation. Pakistan won three matches while India won one and two were drawn.

Indo-Pak test series of field hockey was expected to restart from 2013 as declared by Hockey India. In 2004 test series both India and Pakistan used a foreign coach for the first time. Gehard Rach of Germany was coach for India while Roelant Oltmans of Netherlands was coach for Pakistan.

== List of series ==
Out of eight test series played between the two teams, Pakistan have won on six occasions and India once. One series ended in a draw. Of the total 52 matches played, Pakistan have won 25 times against India's 16, with 11 matches ending in draws.

Year	Matches	Winner	Results	Pakistan		India	
Year	Matches	Winner	Results	Captain	Coach	Captain	Coach
1978	4	Pakistan win	3–1	Islahuddin Siddique	(Pakistan) Sayad A. Hussain	Victor Philips	(India) Randhir Singh Gentle
1981	4	Pakistan win	2–1	Akhtar Rasool	(Pakistan) Khwaja Zakauddin	Surjit Singh Randhawa	(India) Harmik Singh
1986	7	India win	3–2	Hassan Sardar	(Pakistan) Anwar Ahmad Khan	Mohammed Shahid	(India) M. P. Ganesh
1988	6	Draw	2–2	Nasir Ali	(Pakistan) Manzoor-ul Hassan	M. M. Somaya	(India) M. P. Ganesh
1998	8	Pakistan win	4–3	Tahir Zaman	(Pakistan) Islahuddin Siddique	Dhanraj Pillay	(India) Vasudevan Baskaran
1999	9	Pakistan win	5–3	Atif Bashir	(Pakistan) Shehnaz Sheikh	Anil Aldrin	(India) Vasudevan Baskaran
2004	8	Pakistan win	4–2	Waseem Ahmed	(Netherlands) Roelant Oltmans	Dilip Tirkey	(Germany) Gehard Rach
2006	6	Pakistan win	3–1	Muhammad Saqlain	(Pakistan) Asif Bajwa	Ignace Tirkey	(India) Rajinder Singh Jr.

== Matches ==
Test series between India and Pakistan:

=== 1978 Test Series ===
This series was of 4 matches out of which Pakistan won 3 and India won 1 and 0 were drawn. Overall Pakistan was the winner of this series.

Leg	Final Position			Venue	Results		
Leg	Pakistan	India	Draw	Venue	Pakistan	India	Note
Indian Leg	2	0	0	(India) Wankhede Stadium, Mumbai	2	1	Pakistan win
Indian Leg	2	0	0	(India) Bangalore Football Stadium, Bangalore	3	2	Pakistan win
Pakistani Leg	1	1	0	(Pakistan) Gaddafi Stadium, Lahore	6	0	Pakistan win
Pakistani Leg	1	1	0	(Pakistan) National Stadium, Karachi	1	2	India win
Aggregation	3	1	0		12	5	Pakistan win the Test Series

=== 1981 Test Series ===
This series was of 4 matches out of which Pakistan won 2 and India won 1 and 1 were drawn. Overall Pakistan was the winner of this series.

Leg	Final Position			Venue	Results		
Leg	Pakistan	India	Draw	Venue	Pakistan	India	Note
Indian Leg	1	1	0	(India) Wankhede Stadium, Mumbai	5	3	Pakistan win
Indian Leg	1	1	0	(India) Mohun Bagan Ground, Kolkata	3	4	India win
Pakistani Leg	1	0	1	(Pakistan) Gaddafi Stadium, Lahore	2	2	Draw
Pakistani Leg	1	0	1	(Pakistan) National Stadium, Karachi	4	2	Pakistan win
Aggregation	2	1	1		14	11	Pakistan win the Test Series

=== 1986 Test Series ===
This series was of 7 matches out of which Pakistan won 2 and India won 3 and 2 were drawn. Overall India was the winner of this series.

Leg	Final Position			Venue	Results		
Leg	Pakistan	India	Draw	Venue	Pakistan	India	Note
Indian Leg	1	2	0	(India) Mohun Bagan Ground, Kolkata	3	2	Pakistan win
Indian Leg	1	2	0	(India) Shivaji Stadium, Kolhapur	1	2	India win
Indian Leg	1	2	0	(India) Lal Bahadur Shastri Stadium, Hyderabad	3	6	India win
Pakistani Leg	1	1	2	(Pakistan) Jinnah Stadium, Sialkot	3	2	Pakistan win
Pakistani Leg	1	1	2	(Pakistan) Niaz Hockey Stadium, Sargodha	2	2	Draw
Pakistani Leg	1	1	2	(Pakistan) Jinnah Sports Stadium, Islamabad	3	3	Draw
Pakistani Leg	1	1	2	Hockey Club of Pakistan Stadium, Karachi	1	2	India win
Aggregation	2	3	2		16	19	India win the Test Series

=== 1988 Test Series ===
This series was of 6 matches out of which Pakistan won 2 and India won 2 and 2 were drawn. Overall the series was drawn.

Leg	Final Position			Venue	Results		
Leg	Pakistan	India	Draw	Venue	Pakistan	India	Note
Indian Leg	1	2	0	(India) Dhyan Chand National Stadium, New Delhi	2	3	India win
Indian Leg	1	2	0	(India) Dhyan Chand Stadium, Lucknow	1	2	India win
Indian Leg	1	2	0	(India) Railway Stadium, Gwalior	2	1	Pakistan win
Pakistani Leg	1	0	2	(Pakistan) National Stadium, Lahore	1	1	Draw
Pakistani Leg	1	0	2	(Pakistan) Gen. Musa Khan Stadium, Quetta	1	1	Draw
Pakistani Leg	1	0	2	Hockey Club of Pakistan Stadium, Karachi	3	2	Pakistan win
Aggregation	2	2	2		10	10	Series Draw

=== 1998 Test Series ===
This series was of 8 matches out of which Pakistan won 4 and India won 3 and 1 were drawn. Overall Pakistan was the winner of this series.

Leg	Final Position			Venue	Results		
Leg	Pakistan	India	Draw	Venue	Pakistan	India	Note
Habib Bank Trophy	2	2	0	(Pakistan) Lala Ayub Stadium, Peshwar	4	1	Pakistan win
Habib Bank Trophy	2	2	0	(Pakistan) Army Stadium, Rawalpindi	2	1	Pakistan win
Habib Bank Trophy	2	2	0	(Pakistan) National Stadium, Lahore	3	4	India win
Habib Bank Trophy	2	2	0	Hockey Club of Pakistan Stadium, Karachi	0	2	India win
Pepsi Friendship Gold Cup	2	1	1	(India) Dhyan Chand National Stadium, New Delhi	2	3	India win
Pepsi Friendship Gold Cup	2	1	1	(India) Surjeet Singh Stadium, Jalandhar	1	1	Draw
Pepsi Friendship Gold Cup	2	1	1	(India) Begumpet Police Stadium, Hyderabad	3	1	Pakistan win
Pepsi Friendship Gold Cup	2	1	1	(India) Mayor Radhakrishnan Stadium, Chennai	2	0	Pakistan win
Aggregation	4	3	1		17	13	Pakistan win the Test Series

=== 1999 Test Series ===
This series was of 9 matches out of which Pakistan won 5 and India won 3 and 1 were drawn. Overall Pakistan was the winner of this series.

Leg	Final Position			Venue	Results		
Leg	Pakistan	India	Draw	Venue	Pakistan	India	Note
Indian Leg	3	1	0	(India) Dhyan Chand National Stadium, New Delhi	4	3	Pakistan win
Indian Leg	3	1	0	(India) Aish Bag Stadium, Bhopal	4	1	Pakistan win
Indian Leg	3	1	0	(India) Begumpeth Police Stadium, Hyderabad	5	2	Pakistan win
Indian Leg	3	1	0	(India) Mayor Radhakrishnan Stadium, Chennai	0	3	India win
Pakistani Leg	2	2	1	(Pakistan) National Stadium, Lahore	4	2	Pakistan win
Pakistani Leg	2	2	1	Hockey Club of Pakistan Stadium, Karachi	4	2	Pakistan win
Pakistani Leg	2	2	1	(Pakistan) Lala Ayub Stadium, Peshawar	1	2	India win
Pakistani Leg	2	2	1	(Pakistan) Army Stadium, Peshawar	3	3	Draw
Pakistani Leg	2	2	1	(Pakistan) National Stadium, Lahore	2	3	India win
Aggregation	5	3	1		27	21	Pakistan win the Test Series

=== 2004 Test Series ===
In this test series both India and Pakistan used a foreign coach for the first time. Gehard Rach of Germany was coach for India while Roelant Oltmans of Netherlands was coach for Pakistan. This series was of 8 matches out of which Pakistan won 4 and India won 2 and 2 were drawn. Overall Pakistan was the winner of this series.

Leg	Final Position			Venue	Results		
Leg	Pakistan	India	Draw	Venue	Pakistan	India	Note
Pakistani Leg	2	1	1	Hockey Club of Pakistan Stadium, Karachi	2	1	Pakistan win
Pakistani Leg	2	1	1	(Pakistan) Gen. Musa Khan Stadium, Quetta	1	4	India win
Pakistani Leg	2	1	1	(Pakistan) Lala Ayub Stadium, Peshawar	3	2	Pakistan win
Pakistani Leg	2	1	1	(Pakistan) National Stadium, Lahore	4	4	Draw
Indian Leg	2	1	1	(India) Dhyan Chand National Stadium, Delhi	2	1	Pakistan win
Indian Leg	2	1	1	(India) Sector 42 Stadium, Chandigarh	1	1	Draw
Indian Leg	2	1	1	(India) Guru Nanak Dev University Stadium, Amritsar	3	1	Pakistan win
Indian Leg	2	1	1	(India) Gachibowli Hockey Stadium, Hyderabad	0	2	India win
Aggregation	4	2	2		16	16	Pakistan win the Test Series

=== 2006 Test Series ===
This series was of 6 matches out of which Pakistan won 3 and India won 1 and 2 were drawn. Overall Pakistan was the winner of this series.

Leg	Final Position			Venue	Results		
Leg	Pakistan	India	Draw	Venue	Pakistan	India	Note
Indian Leg	3	0	0	(India) Sector 42 Hockey Stadium, Chandigarh	2	1	Pakistan win
Indian Leg	3	0	0	(India) Sector 42 Hockey Stadium, Chandigarh	3	1	Pakistan win
Indian Leg	3	0	0	(India) Surjeet Singh Stadium, Jalandhar	2	1	Pakistan win
Pakistani Leg	0	1	2	(Pakistan) National Stadium, Lahore	1	1	Draw
Pakistani Leg	0	1	2	(Pakistan) Faisalabad Hockey Stadium, Faisalabad	1	2	India win
Pakistani Leg	0	1	2	(Pakistan) Army Stadium, Rawalpindi	3	3	Draw
Aggregation	3	1	2		12	9	Pakistan win the Test Series

== See also ==
- India–Pakistan field hockey rivalry
