= Wouter van Pelt =

Dutch field hockey player

Personal information
- Born: 23 April 1968 (age 58) Alphen aan den Rijn, Netherlands

Sport
- Sport: Field hockey
- Position: Defender
Senior career
Years	Team	Caps	Goals
–	DKS	-	-
–	HDM	-	-
–	Breda	-	-
National team
Years	Team	Caps	Goals
1989–2000	Netherlands	236	-
Medal record
Men's field hockey
Representing the Netherlands
Olympic Games
Gold medal – first place	1996 Atlanta	Team
Gold medal – first place	2000 Sydney	Team
World Cup
Gold medal – first place	1998 Utrecht	Team
Silver medal – second place	1994 Sydney	Team
Champions Trophy
Gold medal – first place	1996 Madras	Team
Gold medal – first place	2000 Amstelveen	Team
Bronze medal – third place	1991 Berlin	Team
Bronze medal – third place	1993 Kuala Lumpur	Team
Bronze medal – third place	1994 Lahore	Team

Wouter van Pelt (born 23 April 1968 in Alphen aan den Rijn) is a former Dutch field hockey player, who played 236 international matches for the Netherlands, in which he scored 21 goals. The defender made his debut for the Dutch on 27 March 1989 in a match against England. He played in the Dutch League for HDM and BH & BC Breda. Van Pelt was a member of the Dutch national team that won the golden medal at the 1996 Summer Olympics in Atlanta, Georgia. Four years later, at the 2000 Summer Olympics in Sydney, the Dutch once again won the title, with Van Pelt on board. He stopped playing hockey at top level in 2005.
