= Stephen Long (sportsman) =

English cricketer and field hockey player

Personal information
- Born: 19 January 1951 (age 75); Bury St Edmunds, –, England
- Batting: Left-handed
- Bowling: Leg break

Domestic team information
- Years: Team
- 1984: Dorset
- 1974–1980: Suffolk

Career statistics
Competition	List A
Matches	2
Runs scored	12
Batting average	6.00
100s/50s	–/–
Top score	7
Balls bowled	–
Wickets	–
Bowling average	–
5 wickets in innings	–
10 wickets in match	–
Best bowling	–
Catches/stumpings	–/–
- Source: Cricinfo, 26 July 2011

Stephen Long
Sport
- Sport: Field hockey
Senior career
Years	Team	Caps	Goals
1971–1973	Loughborough Colleges	-	-
1973–1975	Bury St. Edmunds Y.M.C.A	-	-
1978	Dulwich	-	-
National team
Years	Team	Caps	Goals
–	Great Britain		-
–	England		-

Stephen Richard Lawsell Long (born 19 January 1951) is a former English cricketer and field hockey player. He played hockey for England and Great Britain and in cricket, Long was a left-handed batsman who bowled leg break.

== Biography ==
He was born in Bury St Edmunds, West Suffolk and educated at Culford School and Millfield School.

Long made his debut for Suffolk in the 1974 Minor Counties Championship against Buckinghamshire. He played Minor counties cricket for Suffolk from 1974 to 1980, which included 34 Minor Counties Championship appearances.

Long a Newmarket Upper School PE teacher by trade, was selected by England for the 1975 Men's Hockey World Cup in Kuala Lumpur and while still at Dulwich was selected by England again for the 1978 Men's Hockey World Cup.

He made his List A debut against Buckinghamshire in the 1979 Gillette Cup. In this match, he was dismissed for 5 runs by Raymond Bond. He made a further List A appearance against Sussex in the 2nd round of the same competition. In this match, he scored 7 runs before being dismissed by Colin Wells.

He later played Minor Counties Championship cricket for Dorset in 1984, making 7 appearances and a single MCCA Knockout Trophy match.
