= Imbert Jebbink =

Field hockey player (1946–2024)

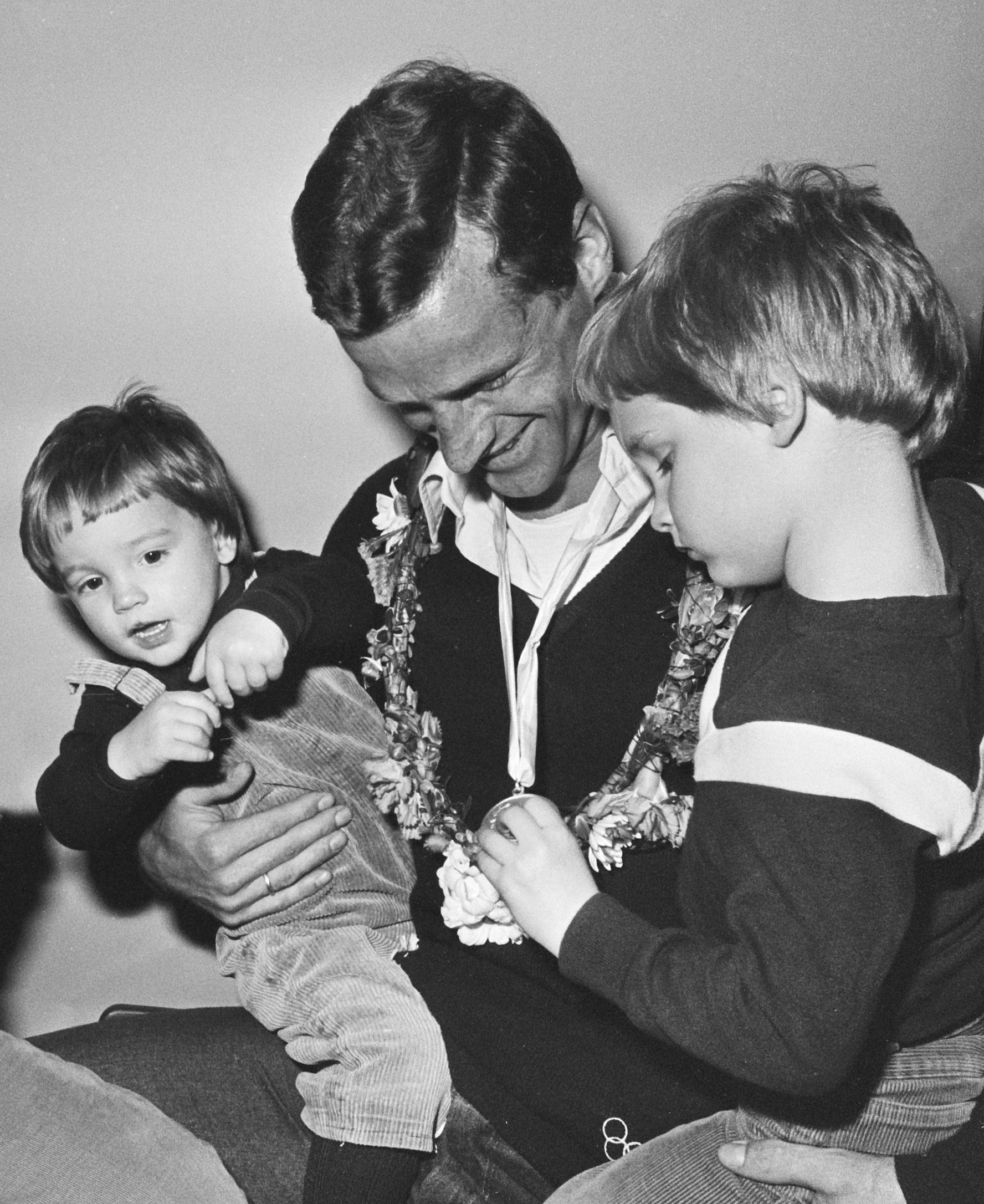
- Jebbink with sons in 1978

Personal information
- Born: 8 December 1946 Hengelo, Netherlands
- Died: 21 August 2024 (aged 77)
- Height: 1.79 m (5 ft 10 in)
- Weight: 72 kg (159 lb)

Sport
- Sport: Field hockey
- Club: Kampong, Utrecht
Medal record
Representing the Netherlands
Hockey World Cup
Silver medal – second place	1978 Buenos Aires	Team

Imbert Maurits Jebbink (8 December 1946 – 21 August 2024) was a Dutch field hockey player. He competed at the 1976 Summer Olympics and 1978 World Cup, where his teams finished in fourth and second place, respectively.

Between 1976 and 1978 Jebbink played 29 international matches and scored no goals.

Jebbink died on 21 August 2024, at the age of 77.
