= Haider Hussain (field hockey) =

Pakistani field hockey player

Haider Hussain حیدر حسین
Personal information
- Born: 14 December 1979 (age 46) Karachi, Sindh, Pakistan

Sport
- Sport: Field hockey
- Position: Right In/Out
Senior career
Years	Team	Caps	Goals
2000 2001-2011 2013 2013	Pakistan Custom; Habib Bank LTD; Oslo HC, Norway. Uden HC, Netherland; Sacramento HC, California; Michigan HC, Detroit	-	-
National team
Years	Team	Caps	Goals
1996–2001	Pakistan	98	(39)

Haider Hussain (Urdu: حیدر حسین), (born 14 December 1979 in Karachi) is a field hockey forward player who was a member of the Pakistan national men's field hockey team, playing in the qualifiers for the 2000 Olympics.

== Early life ==
Born at Karachi's sharyar hospital, Nazimabad on 14 December 1979. Haider is a former pupil of Karachi's Habib Public School, the school of many other hockey stars. In fact, it has been rightly remarked that hockey is taught as a subject in this school.

He came from a sporting family; his father, Syed Nasim Hussain, was a former first-class Volleyball player. In early school life Haider was keen on playing various sports. He has taken part in athletics 400 to 1500 meters running and swimming, most of the time he used to play Basketball in his school life. Sir Abdul Waheed was a coach of Habib Public School hockey team, who was also a brother of Olympian Abdul Hameed former goal keeper of Pakistan's hockey team. Sir Abdul Waheed and Haider's father Syed Nasim Hussain had a great role in Haider's hockey career.

Haider believes that in his national hockey career life three main characters are very important for him, Haider's father, Sir Abdul Waleed and a former Olympian hockey player of Pakistan Hanif Khan. Haider's father used to bring him in every hockey match and Custom hockey ground Karachi, Pakistan, where different Olympian hockey players used to play under Hanif Khan's coaching. Haider's father and Hanif Khan's brother used to work together, This was the chance for Haider to introduce his talent in the hockey field.
