= Ulrich Moissl =

German hockey player

Personal information
- Nationality: German
- Born: 2 January 1974 (age 52) Vienna, Austria

Sport
- Sport: Field hockey

Ulrich Moissl (born 2 January 1974) is a German field hockey player. He competed in the men's tournament at the 2000 Summer Olympics.
