= Hans Jorritsma =

Dutch field hockey player (1949–2026)

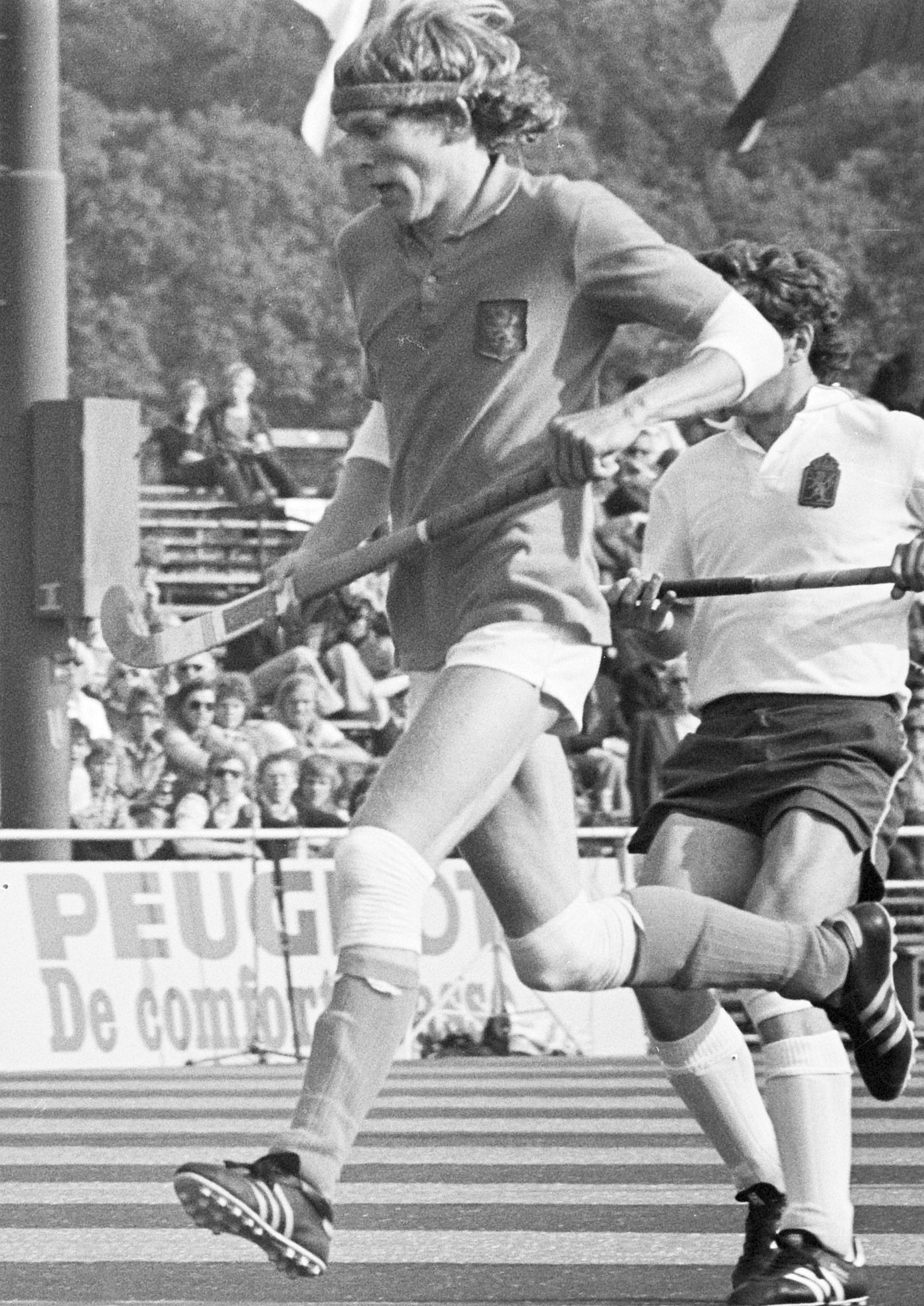
- Jorritsma in 1976

Personal information
- Born: 19 March 1949 Lochem, Netherlands
- Died: 4 June 2026 (aged 77) Amsterdam, Netherlands
- Height: 1.84 m (6 ft 0 in)
- Weight: 73 kg (161 lb)

Sport
- Sport: Field hockey
- Club: AH&BC, Amsterdam
Medal record
Representing the Netherlands
Hockey World Cup
Silver medal – second place	1978 Buenos Aires	Team

Hans Jorritsma (19 March 1949 – 4 June 2026) was a Dutch field hockey player. He competed at the 1976 Olympics and 1978 World Cup, where his teams finished in fourth and second place, respectively. For political reasons Jorritsma refused to receive his World Cup silver medal from the hands of Jorge Rafael Videla. He retired from competitions the same year.

Between 1975 and 1978, Jorritsma played 65 international matches and scored 1 goal.

Jorritsma was the national field hockey coach in 1987–1990 and 1991–1993. After that he headed the national teams of South Africa and Pakistan, and in 1996 was appointed the manager of the Dutch association football team.

Jorritsma died on 4 June 2026, at the age of 77.
