= Alan Hobkirk =

Canadian field hockey player

Alan Hobkirk (born November 7, 1952) is a former field hockey player from Canada, who participated at the 1976 Summer Olympics in Montreal. There the striker finished tenth with the Men's National Team. Hobkirk participated in four Pan American Games between 1971 and 1983, winning a full collection of medals: one golden (1983 in Caracas), two silver (1975 in Mexico, 1979 in San Juan) and one bronze (1971 in Cali).
