= Armand Solie =

Belgian field hockey player

Personal information
- Nationality: Belgian
- Born: 28 April 1944 Ghent, Belgium
- Died: 25 September 2019 (aged 75)

Sport
- Sport: Field hockey

Armand Solie (28 April 1944 – 25 September 2019) was a Belgian field hockey player. He competed at the 1968 Summer Olympics, the 1972 Summer Olympics and the 1976 Summer Olympics.

== Career ==
Solie became active in hockey at La Gantoise HC. With this club he became indoor champion three times, finalist in the Belgian Cup and vice-national champion. Later he moved to Royal Léopold HC.

With this club he became national champion, among other things.

In addition, he was a member of the Belgian hockey team from 1965 to 1978, with which he participated in the Summer Olympics of 1968, 1972 and 1976, among others . In total he collected ± 120 caps.

After his playing career he coached several teams, including the national team. He was also the founder of Indiana HTC in Zevergem. He was also involved in the development of Constantia Hockey in Waregem.
