= Jeon Hong-kwon =

Korean field hockey player

Olympic medal record

Men's field hockey

Representing South Korea
Silver medal – second place	2000 Sydney	Team competition

Jeon Hong-Kwon (born 15 March 1979) is a South Korean former field hockey player who competed in the 2000 Summer Olympics.
