= Maarten Sikking =

Dutch field hockey player

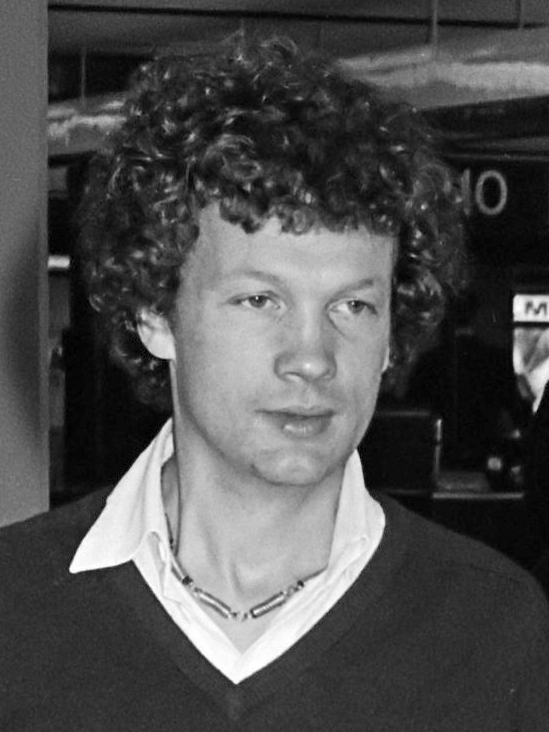
- Maarten Sikking in 1978

Personal information
- Born: 13 February 1948 Bergen op Zoom, the Netherlands
- Died: 5 May 2009 (aged 61) Bali, Indonesia
- Height: 1.78 m (5 ft 10 in)
- Weight: 68 kg (150 lb)

Sport
- Sport: Field hockey
- Club: HTCC, Eindhoven
Medal record
Representing the Netherlands
Hockey World Cup
Gold medal – first place	1973 Amstelveen	Team
Silver medal – second place	1978 Buenos Aires	Team
EuroHockey Nations Championship
Silver medal – second place	1970 Brussels	Team
Bronze medal – third place	1974 Madrid	Team
Silver medal – second place	1978 Hannover	Team

Martinus Jacobus Maria "Maarten" Sikking (13 February 1948 – 5 May 2009) was a field hockey goalkeeper from the Netherlands. He competed at the 1972 and 1976 Summer Olympics, where his team finished in fourth place on both occasions.

Between 1970 and 1980 Sikking played 123 international matches. His most remarkable game was the 1973 World Cup final in Amstelveen, the Netherlands, where he stopped one penalty shot in overtime, and two more in the penalty series. As a result, Netherlands won their first international hockey title.

Sikking was considered one of the best goalkeepers of his time, but never won an Olympic medal. He had high hopes for the 1980 Moscow Games, and after they were boycotted by the Dutch Hockey Federation he burned his hockey gear and retired from competitions. Later he worked in insurance and was involved in various charities in developing countries. He moved to Bali, Indonesia, where he set up a school, married his third wife, and died aged 61.
