= Kelvin Wood =

Canadian field hockey player

Kelvin Wood (born October 1, 1950 in Vancouver, British Columbia) is a Canadian former field hockey player who competed in the 1976 Summer Olympics.
