= Máximo Pellegrino =

Argentine field hockey player

Personal information
- Born: May 6, 1977 (age 49) Argentina

Sport
- Sport: Field hockey

Máximo Pellegrino (born 6 May 1977) is an Argentine former field hockey player who competed in the 2000 Summer Olympics.
