= Ernesto Barreiros =

Argentine field hockey player

Personal information
- Nationality: Argentine
- Born: 24 February 1950 (age 76)

Sport
- Sport: Field hockey

Ernesto Barreiros (born 24 February 1950) is an Argentine field hockey player. He competed in the men's tournament at the 1972 Summer Olympics.
