= Konrad Sikking =

Dutch footballer

Personal information
- Full name: Konrad Sikking-Stanisławczyk
- Date of birth: 1 September 1998 (age 28)
- Place of birth: 's-Hertogenbosch, Netherlands
- Height: 1.87 m (6 ft 2 in)
- Position: Goalkeeper

Youth career
- –2008: RKVV Emplina
- 2008–2020: FC Den Bosch

Senior career*
Years	Team	Apps	(Gls)
2020–2023	FC Den Bosch	6	(0)
- * Club domestic league appearances and goals

Konrad Sikking-Stanisławczyk (born 1 September 1998) is a Dutch former footballer who played as a goalkeeper.

== Career ==
Sikking played at RKVV Emplina prior to joining the youth academy of FC Den Bosch at nine years-old. He played as a goalkeeper for Jong FC Den Bosch and signed a professional contract in June 2018. In June 2020 Sikking signed a two-year contract renewal with the club. He made his debut for Den Bosch in the KNVB Cup against VVV Venlo on 27 October 2020. He made his league debut 4 days later against Roda JC, keeping a clean sheet in a 0–0 draw. In total, Sikking made three league appearances and the cup appearance for Den Bosch during the 2020–21 season. In May 2022 he signed a new two-year contract with the club. In March 2023 Sikking was in goal as Den Bosch suffered a 13-0 Eerste Divisie defeat at PEC Zwolle, a scoreline which equalled the all-time record Dutch professional league defeat.

== Post-playing career ==
Sikking retired from playing football at the end of the 2022–23 season. He completed a degree in law.
