= Marek Kruś =

Polish field hockey player

Personal information
- Nationality: Polish
- Born: 23 June 1952 (age 73) Opalenica, Poland

Sport
- Sport: Field hockey

Marek Kruś (born 23 June 1952) is a Polish field hockey player. He competed in the men's tournament at the 1972 Summer Olympics.
