= Avtar Singh Gill =

Malaysian field hockey player (born 1954)

Personal information
- Nationality: Malaysian
- Born: 29 December 1954 (age 71)

Sport
- Sport: Field hockey
Medal record
Men's field hockey
Representing Malaysia
Asian Games
Bronze medal – third place	1978 Bangkok	Team

Avtar Singh Gill (born 29 December 1954) is a Malaysian field hockey player. He competed in the men's tournament at the 1976 Summer Olympics.
