= Shinji Iwata =

Japanese baseball player

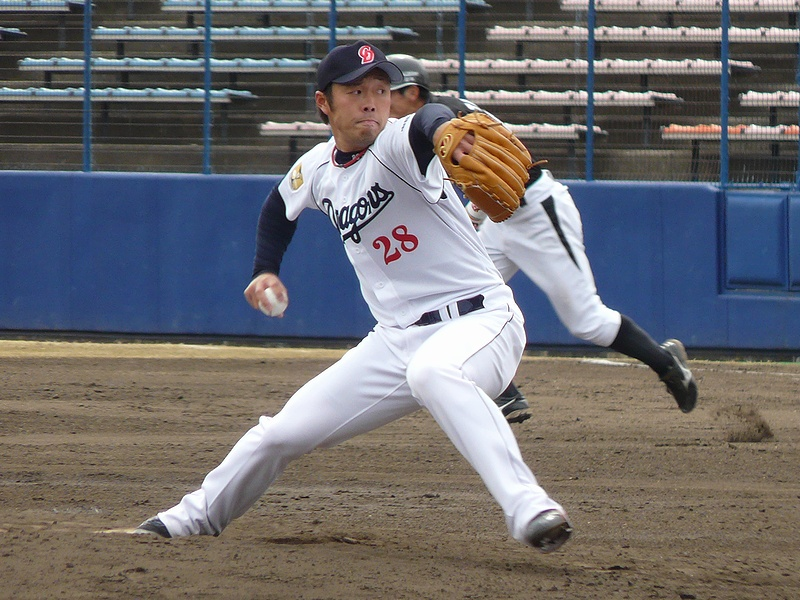
- Pitcher/Coach
- Born: January 27, 1987 (age 39); Gifu, Gifu, Japan
- Batted: Left Threw: Right

debut
- June 9, 2010, for the Chunichi Dragons

Last NPB appearance
- September 27, 2016, for the Chunichi Dragons

Career statistics (through 2016)
- Win-Loss: 9-15
- ERA: 3.72
- Strikeouts: 162
- Stats at Baseball Reference

Teams
- As player: Chunichi Dragons (2009–2016); As coach: Chunichi Dragons (2018)

Shinji Iwata (岩田 慎司, Iwata Shinji; born January 27, 1987 in Gifu, Gifu, Japan) was a professional Japanese right-handed pitcher. He played for the Chunichi Dragons.

On 23 September 2016, it was announced that Iwata was to retire from professional baseball.
