= Rafał Grotowski =

Polish field hockey player

Rafał Grotowski (born 18 September 1973 in Poznań, Wielkopolskie) is a field hockey player from Poland, who was a member of the Men's National Team that ended up in twelfth and last place at the 2000 Summer Olympics in Sydney. The team had qualified by surprise for the Games by defeating bigger names like New Zealand at the 2000 Men's Field Hockey Olympic Qualifier in Osaka, Japan.
