= Terry Gregg =

British hockey player

Personal information
- Born: 23 November 1950 (age 75) Northern Ireland
- Height: 170 cm (5 ft 7 in)
- Weight: 67 kg (148 lb)

Sport
- Sport: Field hockey
- Position: Midfield/Forward
Senior career
Years	Team	Caps	Goals
1968–1969	Instonians	-	-
1971–1973	Queen's Belfast	-	-
1973–1990	Belfast YMCA	-	-
National team
Years	Team	Caps	Goals
–	Ireland & Great Britain		-
Medal record
Field hockey
Representing Great Britain
Champions Trophy
Bronze medal – third place	1978 Lahore	Team competition

Terence Gregg (born 23 November 1950) is a British and Irish former field hockey player. He competed in the men's tournament at the 1972 Summer Olympics.

== Biography ==
Gregg was educated at Royal Belfast Academical Institution and studied at Queen's University Belfast.

He played club hockey for Instonians in the Irish leagues and Ulster at regional level. He won his first Irish cap against Wales on 14 March 1970 and participated in the 1970 Men's EuroHockey Nations Championship.

Gregg was part of the bronze medal winning Great Britain team that competed at the ianugural 1978 Men's Hockey Champions Trophy, in Lahore, Pakistan.

He was selected for the Great Britain team for the 1980 Olympic Games in Moscow, but subsequently did not attend due to the boycott.
