= Jerzy Wybieralski =

Polish field hockey player

Jerzy Wybieralski (born 8 September 1954 in Poznań) is a Polish former field hockey player who competed in the 1980 Summer Olympics.

He is a brother of Józef Wybieralski; uncle of Krzysztof Wybieralski; uncle of Łukasz Wybieralski.
