= Józef Wybieralski =

Polish field hockey player (1946–2023)

Józef Wybieralski (9 March 1946 – 7 November 2023) was a Polish field hockey player who competed in the 1972 Summer Olympics.

Wybieralski was born in Poznań on 9 March 1946. He was a brother of Jerzy Wybieralski, as well as father of Krzysztof Wybieralski and Łukasz Wybieralski. Józef Wybieralski died on 7 November 2023, at the age of 77.
