= Theo Doyer =

Dutch field hockey player

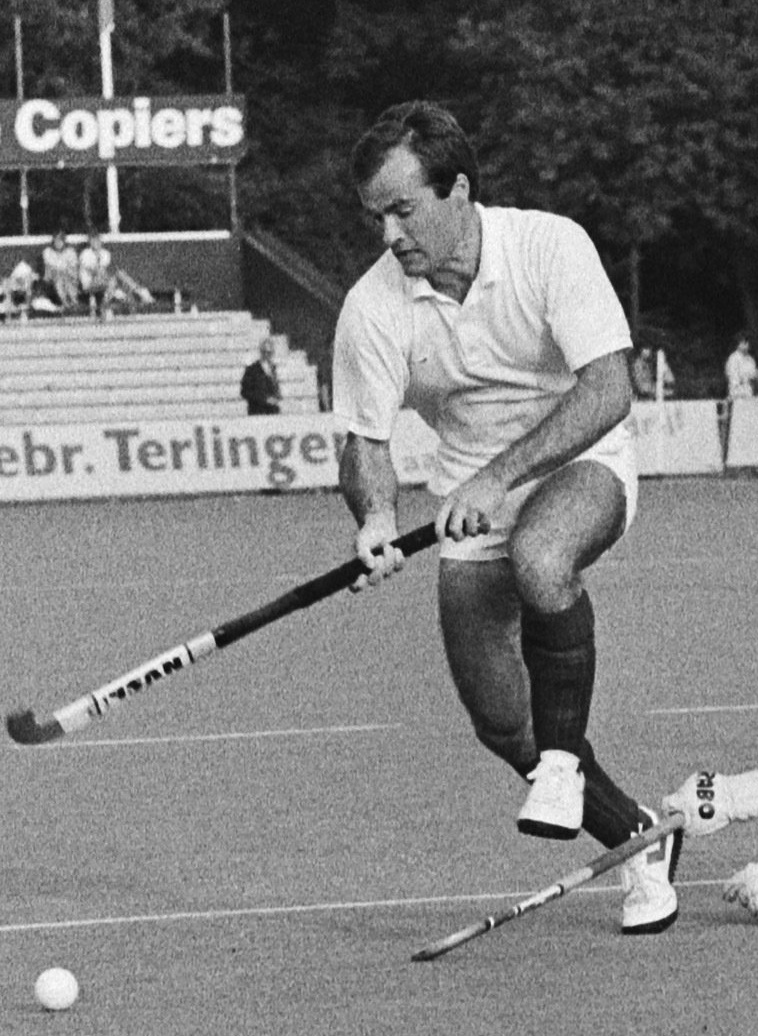
- Theo Doyer in 1983
- Born: December 29, 1955; Amsterdam, North Holland
- Died: November 10, 2010 (aged 54)
- Occupation: Field hockey player

Jan Jacob Theodoor "Theo" Doyer (December 29, 1955 – November 10, 2010) was a field hockey player from the Netherlands, who was a member of the Dutch National Team that finished sixth in the 1984 Summer Olympics in Los Angeles. Eight years earlier he was also on the Holland squad, that ended up fourth at the 1976 Summer Olympics in Montreal.

== Career ==
Doyer, a forward who played club hockey for HC Bloemendaal, was born in Amsterdam and earned a total number of 182 caps, scoring 44 goals, in the years 1975–1988. In 1987 he won the European title with the Dutch squad, after beating England on penalty strokes in the finale of the 1987 Men's Hockey European Nations Cup in Moscow.

== Retirement ==
After retiring as a player, Doyer started working at the then ministry of Welfare. He later worked for the Sports & Recreation department of the city of Amsterdam. At the start of 2008 he was diagnosed with Amyotrophic lateral sclerosis and he died in November 2010, aged 54.
