= Łukasz Wybieralski =

Polish field hockey player

Medal record

Men's indoor field hockey

Representing Poland

Indoor World Cup
Silver medal – second place	2007 Vienna	Team
Silver medal – second place	2011 Poznan	Team

Łukasz Wybieralski (born 27 April 1975 in Poznań) is a Polish former field hockey player who competed in the 2000 Summer Olympics.

He is brother of Krzysztof Wybieralski; son of Józef Wybieralski; nephew of Jerzy Wybieralski.
