= Islahuddin (field hockey) =

Pakistani field hockey player

Islahuddin اِصلاح الدین
Personal information
- Full name: Islahuddin Siddiqui
- Born: 10 January 1948 (age 78)

Sport
- Sport: Field hockey
Medal record
Medal record
Men's field hockey
Representing Pakistan
Olympic Games
Silver medal – second place	1972 Munich	Team competition
Bronze medal – third place	1976 Montreal	Team competition
World Cup
Gold medal – first place	1971 Barcelona	Team
Silver medal – second place	1975 Kuala Lumpur	Team
Gold medal – first place	1978 Buenos Aires	Team
Asian Games
Gold medal – first place	1970 Bangkok	Team
Gold medal – first place	1974 Tehran	Team
Gold medal – first place	1978 Bangkok	Team
Champions Trophy
Gold medal – first place	1978 Lahore	Team
- Updated on 6 April 2024

Islahuddin (Urdu: اِصلاح الدین; born 10 January 1948) is a field hockey player from Pakistan. He was born in Meerut, India.

A right winger from Pakistan, he led Pakistan to Hockey World Cup glory in 1978. Not only did Pakistan win the World Cup under his captaincy, it also completed a grand slam by winning the Champions Trophy and an Asian Games gold medal as well in 1978.

Islahuddin played between 1967 and 1978. He was capped 130 times and scored 137 goals. He won the silver medal in the 1972 Summer Olympics at Munich, W. Germany and a bronze medal in the 1976 Summer Olympics at Montreal. Islahuddin was member of team that won 1971 World Cup under captaincy of Khalid Mahmood in Barcelona. He was captain of 1975 World Cup runner-up team and 1978 World Cup winning team. He was gold medalist in the 1970 Asian Games held at Bangkok, 1974 Asian Games held at Tehran and 1978 Asian Games at Bangkok.

After his retirement from the sport, he has been associated with hockey as a coach and manager of the Pakistan field hockey team along with commentator and member of the FIH rules board. In 1990, he was manager of Pakistan team that was runner-up in the World Cup tournament played in Lahore, Pakistan. The FIH awarded him the greatest award in hockey services, the diploma of merit, in recognition of his international hockey services. He was the captain of the Pakistan hockey team in 45 international matches (43 matches were won and two ended in a draw).

Islahuddin is also author of book 'Dash Through My Life'.

== Career ==
- He was the manager and chief coach of 'Asian Eleven' in 1990 and then 'Asian Eleven' won the tournament of the five continents.

== Awards and recognition ==
- Pride of Performance Award by the President of Pakistan in 1982
- Sitara-i-Imtiaz Award by the President of Pakistan in 2010
- Plans for a new hockey academy and stadium in Karachi were announced in January 2010. This academy will help the sportsmen in Karachi to use the facilities for developing their skills. Karachi Saddar Town administrator told reporters on the occasion that naming the academy after legendary hockey player like Islahuddin was to honour him for his services to the game of hockey.

== See also ==
- Pakistan Hockey Federation
