= Krzysztof Wybieralski =

Polish field hockey player (born 1972)

Krzysztof Wybieralski (born 1 February 1972 in Poznań) is a Polish former field hockey player who competed in the 2000 Summer Olympics.

He is brother of Łukasz Wybieralski; son of Józef Wybieralski; nephew of Jerzy Wybieralski.
